= List of islands by name (K) =

This article features a list of islands sorted by their name beginning with the letter K.

== K ==
Island's Name	Island group(s)	Country/Countries
Kachelotplate	East Frisian Islands	Germany
Kácsa-sziget	Tisza	Hungary
Kagalaska	Andreanof Islands group of the Aleutian Islands, Alaska	United States
Kahoʻolawe	(Hawaii) Hawaiian Islands	United States
Kakawaie	Lake Kagawong, Ontario	Canada
Kakeromajima	Amami Islands part of the Satsunan Islands part of the Ryukyu Islands	Japan
Kakrasaar		Estonia
Kalamos	Ionian Islands	Greece
Kalolimnos	Dodecanese	Greece
Kalpeni	Lakshadweep	India
Kalymnos	Dodecanese	Greece
Kållandsö	Vänern lake	Sweden
Kalsoy	Faroe Islands	Denmark
Kamenka	Kolyma Bay	Russia
Kanaga	Andreanof Islands group of the Aleutian Islands, Alaska	United States
Kapingamarangi		Federated States of Micronesia
Kapiti		New Zealand
Kapussaar		Estonia
Karaginsky	Bering Sea Group	Russia
Kardiotissa	Cyclades Islands	Greece
Karkarpko	Chukchi Sea Group	Russia
Karmøy	Rogaland	Norway
Kárpathos	Dodecanese	Greece
Karsibór	Oder Lagoon islands	Poland
Kásos	Dodecanese	Greece
Kastellórizo	Dodecanese	Greece
Kastos	Ionian Islands	Greece
Kat O	Hong Kong	China
Katič	Adriatic Sea	Montenegro
Kau Sai Chau	Hong Kong	China
Kauaʻi	(Hawaii) Hawaiian Islands	United States
Kaukura	Palliser Islands, Tuamotus, French Polynesia	France
Kaʻula	(Hawaii) Hawaiian Islands	United States
Kavaratti	Lakshadweep	India
Kayak	Gulf of Alaska, Alaska	United States
Kea	Cyclades	Greece
Keewaydin	Florida	United States
Kefalonia	Ionian Islands	Greece
Kelefesia	Haʻapai	Tonga
Kelleys	Lake Erie, Ohio	United States
Kelly	Mississippi River, Illinois	United States
Kelly's	Conception Bay, Newfoundland and Labrador	Canada
Kenosha	Lake Abitibi Ontario	Canada
Kentucky Bend Bar	Mississippi River, Arkansas and Mississippi	United States
Keppel	Falkland Islands	United Kingdom
Keri	Gulf of Finland	Estonia
Keros	Cyclades	Greece
Kerrera	Inner Hebrides	Scotland
Keskmine Vaika	Vaika Islands	Estonia
Kesselaid		Estonia
Keswick Island	Queensland	Australia
Key Biscayne	Biscayne Bay, Florida	United States
Key Haven	Florida Keys, Florida	United States
Key Largo	Florida Keys, Florida	United States
Key West	Florida Keys, Florida	United States
Key Vaca	Florida Keys, Florida	United States
Khalki	Dodecanese	Greece
Kharg	Persian Gulf	Iran
Khvostof	Rat Islands group of the Aleutian Islands, Alaska	United States
Kigigak	Ninglick River, Alaska	United States
Kihnu	Gulf of Riga	Estonia
Kikaigashima	Amami Islands part of the Satsunan Islands part of the Ryukyu Islands	Japan
Kila		Cyprus
Kili	Ralik Chain	Marshall Islands
Kili Holm	The North Isles, Orkney Islands	Scotland
Killygowan	Upper Lough Erne	United Kingdom
Killisnoo	Alexander Archipelago, Alaska	United States
Kiltan	Lakshadweep	India
Kimolos	Cyclades	Greece
Kinali	Princes' Islands	Turkey
Kinaros	Dodecanese	Greece
King	British Columbia	Canada
King	Bering Sea, Alaska	United States
King	Bass Strait, Tasmania	Australia
King George	South Shetland Islands	Antarctica
King	Allegheny River, Pennsylvania	United States
King's	River Shannon	Ireland
King's	Georgian Bay Ontario	Canada
King William	Nunavut	Canada
Kinmen (Quemoy)	Kinmen County	Taiwan
Kinnausy	Lower Lough Erne	Ireland
Kiritimati	Line Islands	Kiribati
Kis-Tisza-sziget	Tisza	Hungary
Kish	Persian Gulf	Iran
Kiska	Rat Islands group of the Aleutian Islands, Alaska	United States
Kita daitō	Daitō Islands part of the Ryukyu Islands	Japan
Kita Kojima	Senkaku Islands	Japan
Kitchener	Lake Huron, Ontario	Canada
Kithnos	Cyclades	Greece
Kızılada	Mediterranean	Turkey
Kleides		Cyprus
Klein Bonaire	Netherlands Antilles	Kingdom of the Netherlands
Klein Curaçao	Netherlands Antilles	Kingdom of the Netherlands
Klippa	Haapsalu Bay	Estonia
Kloostrisaar	Lake Pühajärv	Estonia
Knarrholmen	Southern Gothenburg Archipelago	Sweden
Knight	Lake Champlain, Vermont	United States
Knockemdown Key	Florida Keys, Florida	United States
Knox Atoll	Ratak Chain	Marshall Islands
Kobjeltak	Arno Atoll	Marshall Islands
Koch	Nunavut	Canada
Kodakarajima	Tokara Islands part of the Satsunan Islands part of the Ryukyu Islands	Japan
Kodiak	Kodiak Archipelago, Alaska	United States
Koh Dek Koul		Cambodia
Koh Kong		Cambodia
Koh Poulo Wai		Cambodia
Koh Preab		Cambodia
Koh Pring		Cambodia
Koh Rong		Cambodia
Koh Rong Sanloem		Cambodia
Koh Russei		Cambodia
Koh Sdach		Cambodia
Koh Seh		Cambodia
Koh Tang		Cambodia
Koh Thmei		Cambodia
Koh Thonsay		Cambodia
Kohama	Yaeyama Islands part of the Sakishima Islands part of the Ryukyu Islands	Japan
Kőhidi-sziget		Hungary
Kõinastu laid	Väinameri Sea	Estonia
Koipsi	Kolga Bay	Estonia
Kokanongwi	Georgian Bay, Ontario	Canada
Kolfage	Lake Huron, Ontario	Canada
Kolmenasva	Matsalu Bay	Estonia
Koločep	Elafit islands	Croatia
Koltur	Faroe Islands	Denmark
Kolyuchin	Chukchi Sea Group	Russia
Koński Smug	Oder Lagoon islands	Poland
Koppos		Cyprus
Korčula	Central Dalmatian Archipelago, Adriatic Sea	Croatia
Kordylia		Cyprus
Kõrksaar	Gulf of Riga	Estonia
Kornati	Kornati archipelago	Croatia
Korom-sziget	Tisza	Hungary
Kós	Dodecanese	Greece
Kosa Meechkyn	Bering Sea Group	Russia
Koster Islands		Sweden
Kotlin		Russia
Koufonisi	Cyclades	Greece
Kowloon Rock	Hong Kong	China
Koyama	Bajuni Islands	Somalia
Kozloduy	Danube River	Bulgaria
Kōzu-shima	Izu Islands	Japan
Krassi	Gulf of Finland	Estonia
Kräsuli	Tallinn Bay	Estonia
Kreenholm	Narva River	Estonia
Krk		Croatia
Krenitzin	Fox Islands group of the Aleutian Islands, Alaska	United States
Kruzof	Alexander Archipelago, Alaska	United States
Ksamil Islands	Ionian Islands	Albania
Kuba-jima	Senkaku Islands	Japan
Kubbar	Persian Gulf	Kuwait
Kuchinoerabushima	Ōsumi Islands part of the Satsunan Islands part of the Ryukyu Islands	Japan
Kuchinoshima	Tokara Islands part of the Satsunan Islands part of the Ryukyu Islands	Japan
Kugong	Belcher Islands, Nunavut	Canada
Kuiu	Alexander Archipelago, Alaska	United States
Kumari	Väinameri Sea	Estonia
Kumbli	Tallinn Bay	Estonia
Kumejima	Okinawa Islands part of the Ryukyu Islands	Japan
Kunoy	Faroe Islands	Denmark
Kuper	Gulf Islands, British Columbia	Canada
Kupreanof	Alexander Archipelago, Alaska	United States
Kurima	Miyako Islands part of the Sakishima Islands part of the Ryukyu Islands	Japan
Kuroshima	Yaeyama Islands part of the Sakishima Islands part of the Ryukyu Islands	Japan
Kuruvadweep	Kabini River, Kerala	India
Kura Rock	Aran Region	Azerbaijan
Kuusisto		Finland
Kvaløya	Tromsø Municipality	Norway
Kvitsøy	Kvitsøy islands, Rogaland	Norway
Kvitøya	Svalbard	Norway
Kwajalein	Ralik Chain	Marshall Islands
Kyra Panagia	Sporades	Greece
Kythira	Ionian Islands	Greece
Kythnos	Cyclades	Greece
Kyūshū	Japanese archipelago	Japan

== See also ==
- List of islands (by country)
- List of islands by area
- List of islands by population
- List of islands by highest point
