= Koh Preab =

Cambodian island in the Gulf of Thailand

Native name: កោះព្រាប
- Location within Cambodia

Geography
- Location: Cambodia - South East Asia
- Coordinates: 10°40′N 103°30′E
- Area: 0.0046 km^{2} (0.0018 sq mi)
- Length: 0.1 km (0.06 mi)
- Width: 0.063–0.074 km (0.039–0.046 mi)
- Highest elevation: 3 m (10 ft)

Administration
- Cambodia
- Province: Sihanoukville
- District: Sihanoukville

Demographics
- Ethnic groups: Khmer

Koh Preab, Khmer: កោះព្រាប , "Dove Island", named "Île du Départ" during the French colonial period is an island of Cambodia, situated in the Bay of Kompong Saom Sihanoukville Province near its south-eastern coast. This small island has been integrated into the local harbor's breakwater just north of the Sihanoukville Autonomous Port. The estimated terrain elevation above sea level is 3 meters. A unit of the Royal Cambodian Navy is based on the island.

== See also ==
- Koh Rong
- Koh Rong Sanloem
- List of islands of Cambodia
- List of Cambodian inland islands
- Koh Kong
