= Koh Poulo Wai =

Cambodian islands in the Gulf of Thailand

Koh Wai កោះពូលូវៃ (Khmer)
- Location within Cambodia

Geography
- Location: Cambodia - South East Asia
- Coordinates: 9°55′N 102°54′E
- Area: 3.9 km^{2} (1.5 sq mi)
- Length: 5.4 km (3.36 mi)
- Width: 1.6–0.3 km (0.99–0.19 mi)
- Coastline: 14 km (8.7 mi)

Administration
- Cambodia
- Province: Kampot

Demographics
- Population: 0
- Languages: Khmer
- Ethnic groups: Khmer, Chvea, and Cham (historically)

Koh Wai, (Khmer: កោះពូលូវៃ), also known as Poulo Wai or the Wai Islands, is a group of two small wooded and uninhabited islands in the Gulf of Siam. The islands are located far away from the shore, 95 kilometres (59 miles) to the southwest of the coast of Preah Sihanouk Province, Cambodia. Administratively Koh Wai falls under Kampot Province. The Khmer word Koh (កោះ), means 'island' translated into English. Poulo Wai is of Malay origin, and its related word is pulo ('island' in Cham). The name "Koh Poulo Wai" is thus pleonastic, meaning "Wai Island Island".

Both islands are roughly 5 km long with a maximum width of about 1.5 km (0.9 miles). They are located 1.4 km (0.9 mi) from each other, separated by a channel of ¾ mile (1.2 km) wide. The depth of the channel is about 40 feet (12.2 metres). The west island is about 100 metres (330 ft) at its south-western end. The eastern island is around 61 metres (200 ft) and rock fringed.

== History ==
These islands were part of the basis of overlapping territorial claims between Cambodia, Thailand and Vietnam; the three nations used differing methods of measuring the extent of their territorial waters from the islands.

In May 1975, the area around these islands and nearby Koh Tang was the site of the Mayaguez incident, the last combat action of the Vietnam War, which involved the rescue of the SS Mayaguez. One month later, Vietnam People's Army forces seized the islands and there was a battle between Khmer Rouge and Vietnamese troops over the control of the islands. Finally, the Vietnamese evacuated Koh Wai in August.

The Koh Wai islands were for a long time off-limits to tourists, but now they can be visited in organized excursions. Since the trip is too long to go and come back in the same day, visitors usually stay overnight on one of the islands.

== See also ==
- Koh Rong Sanloem
- Koh Sdach
- List of islands of Cambodia
- List of Cambodian inland islands
- Sihanoukville
