= Koh Dek Koul =

Cambodian island in the Gulf of Thailand

Native name: កោះដេកកោល
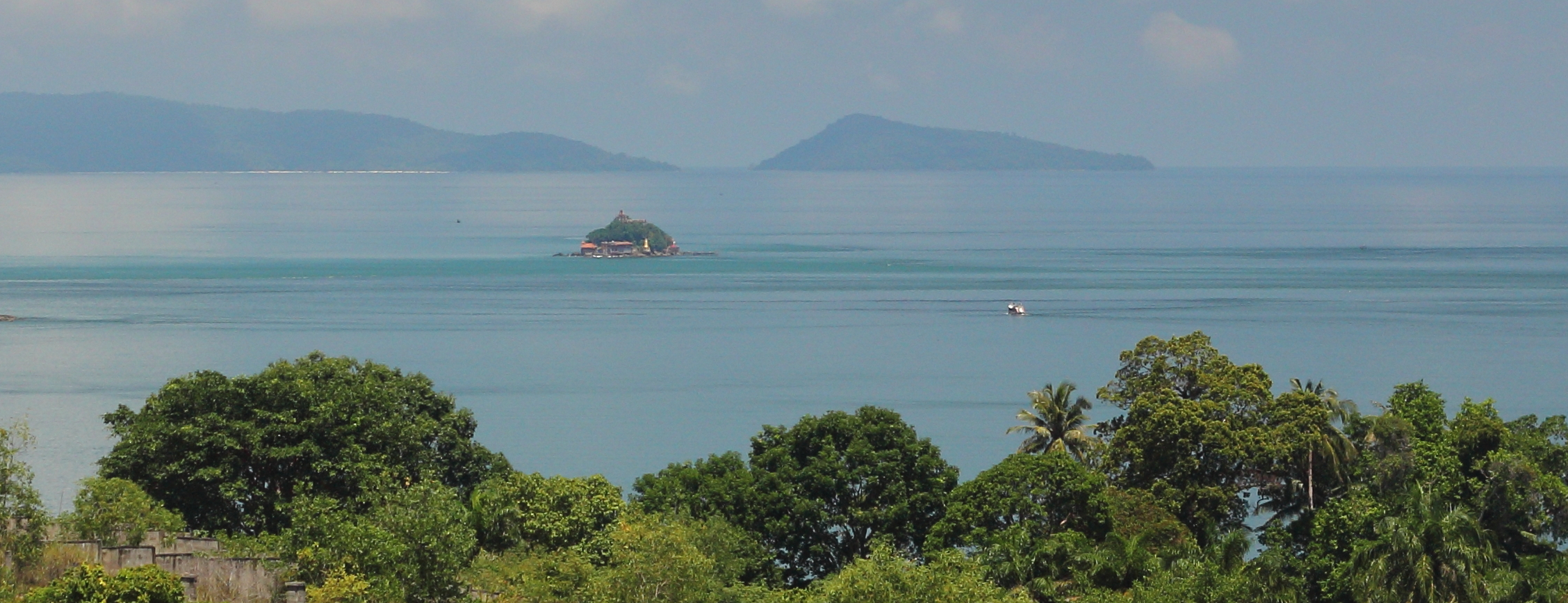

- Location within Cambodia

Geography
- Location: Cambodia - South East Asia
- Coordinates: 10°38′N 103°27′E
- Length: 0.2 km (0.12 mi)
- Width: 0.1–0.2 km (0.062–0.124 mi)
- Coastline: 0.3 km (0.19 mi)

Administration
- Cambodia
- Province: Sihanoukville
- District: Sihanoukville

Koh Dek Koul Khmer: កោះដេកកោល, Nail island is a small island in the Gulf of Thailand located about 7 km off the coast of Sihanoukville city, in southern Cambodia. The exclusive Mirax Resort is based on Koh Dek Koul.

== See also ==
- Koh Rong Sanloem
- Koh Sdach
- List of islands of Cambodia
- List of Cambodian inland islands
- Sihanoukville
