= Koh Puos =

Cambodian island in the Gulf of Thailand

Native name: កោះពស់ Nickname: Morakot Island
- Location within Cambodia

Geography
- Location: Cambodia - South East Asia
- Coordinates: 10°37′N 103°28′E
- Area: 1.1 km^{2} (0.42 sq mi)
- Length: 1.7 km (1.06 mi)
- Width: 0.7–1.4 km (0.43–0.87 mi)
- Coastline: 5.2 km (3.23 mi)
- Highest elevation: 3 m (10 ft)

Administration
- Cambodia
- Province: Sihanoukville
- District: Sihanoukville

Demographics
- Ethnic groups: Khmer

Koh Puos or Kaoh Puos (Khmer: កោះពស់), Snake Island - named "Île Coudée" (Elbow Island) during the French colonial period) is a small island in the Gulf of Thailand, located about 0.63 km (0 mi) off the coast of Sihanoukville city in southern Cambodia. It is administered by Sangkat 3 of Mittakpheap District in Sihanoukville Province.

The island has been made accessible via a road bridge, completed in 2011 as part of a development initiative of the Russian Koh Puos Investment Group (KPIG). A long term government concession granted in 2006 was followed by large scale planning of "a high-end property project". Since, a number of project alterations and subsequent applications for permission at the Council of the Development of Cambodia have led to many delays.

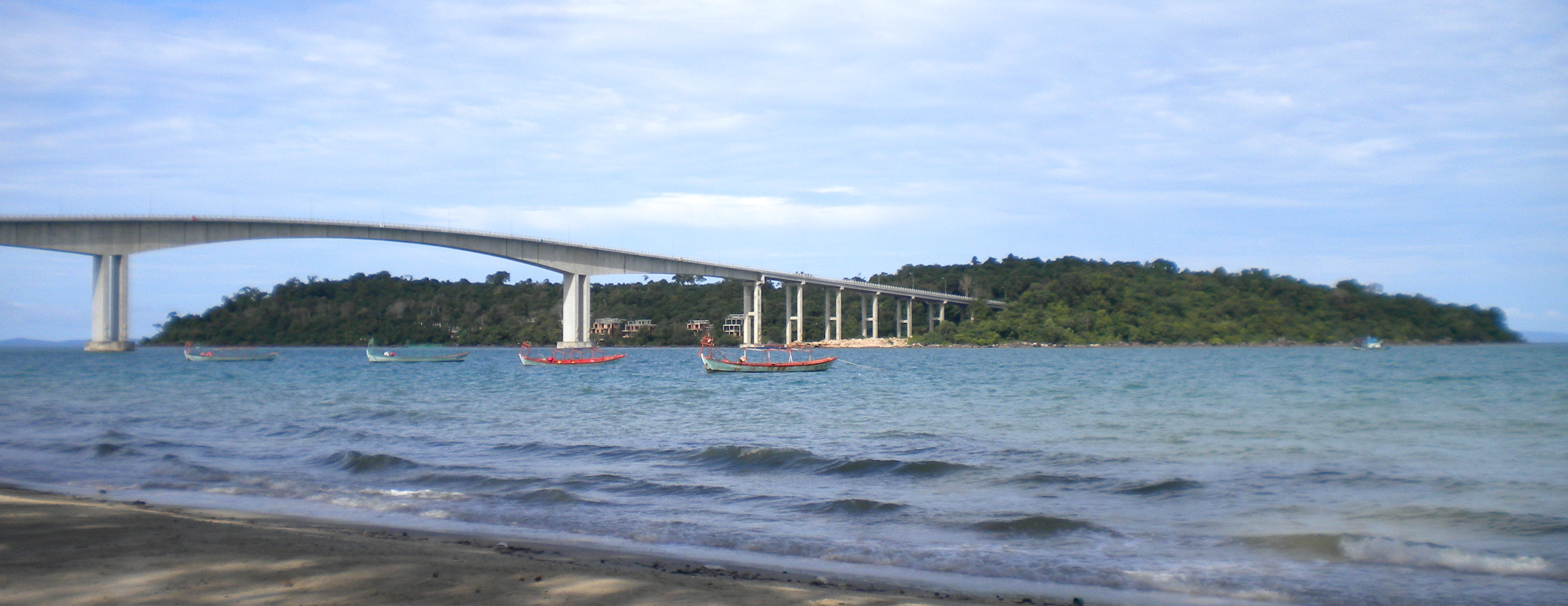
Snake Island with completed bridge, as seen from Hawaii Beach in October 2014

== See also ==
- Koh Ta Kiev
- Koh Russei
- Ream National Park
- List of islands of Cambodia
- Sihanoukville (city)
