= Koh Russei =

Cambodian island in the Gulf of Thailand

Koh Russey
Native name: កោះឬស្សី
- Location within Cambodia

Geography
- Location: Cambodia - South East Asia
- Coordinates: 10°29′N 103°33′E
- Area: 1.4 km^{2} (0.54 sq mi)
- Length: 1.7 km (1.06 mi)
- Width: 0.7–1.7 km (0.43–1.06 mi)
- Coastline: 6 km (3.7 mi)

Administration
- Cambodia
- Province: Preah Sihanouk
- City: Kampong Saom

Demographics
- Ethnic groups: Khmer

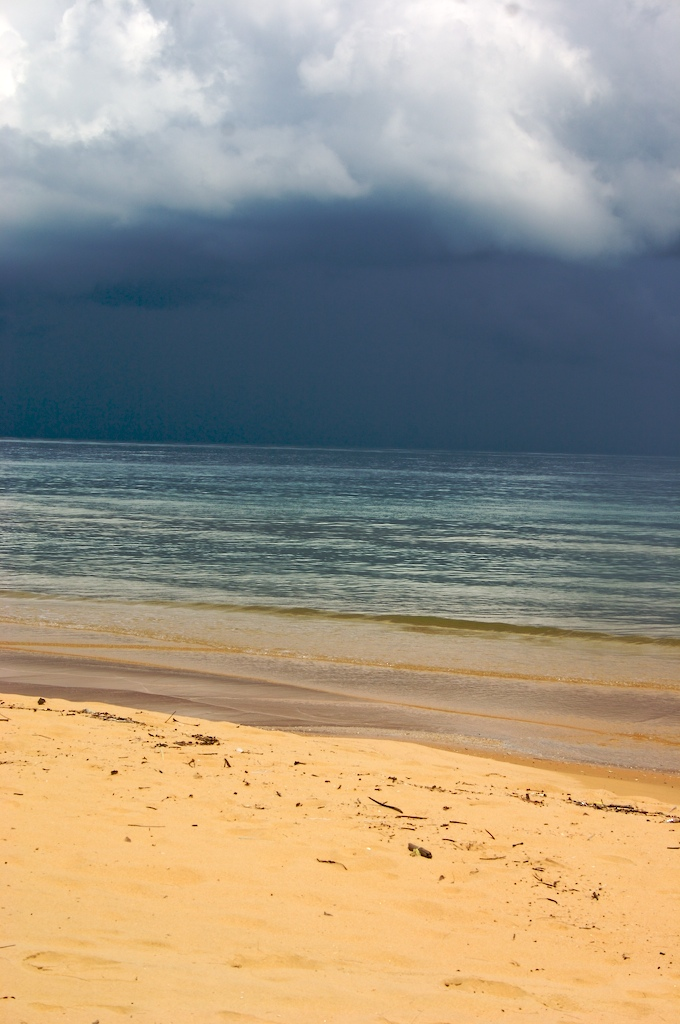
Bamboo Island

Koh Russei, Koh Russey or Bamboo Island (Khmer: កោះឬស្សី) is one of a group of small islands in the Gulf of Thailand, located about 4.5 km (3 mi) off the coast of Sihanoukville city in southern Cambodia. It is administered by Prey Nob District in Sihanoukville Province.

For many years, Koh Russey served exclusively as a small outpost of the Cambodian Navy. However, increasing development and rising tourist numbers in Sihanoukville brought tourism to the island. The investment company Citystar is currently developing a low-density villa community as well as a luxury hotel, that will follow EarthCheck bench-marking and certification. The project is planned to be completed in 2016 and going to serve hotels and resorts.

== See also ==
- Koh Rong
- Koh Rong Sanloem
- Koh Sdach
- List of islands of Cambodia
- List of Cambodian inland islands
- Sihanoukville
