= Koh Pring =

Cambodian island in the Gulf of Thailand

Native name: កោះព្រីង
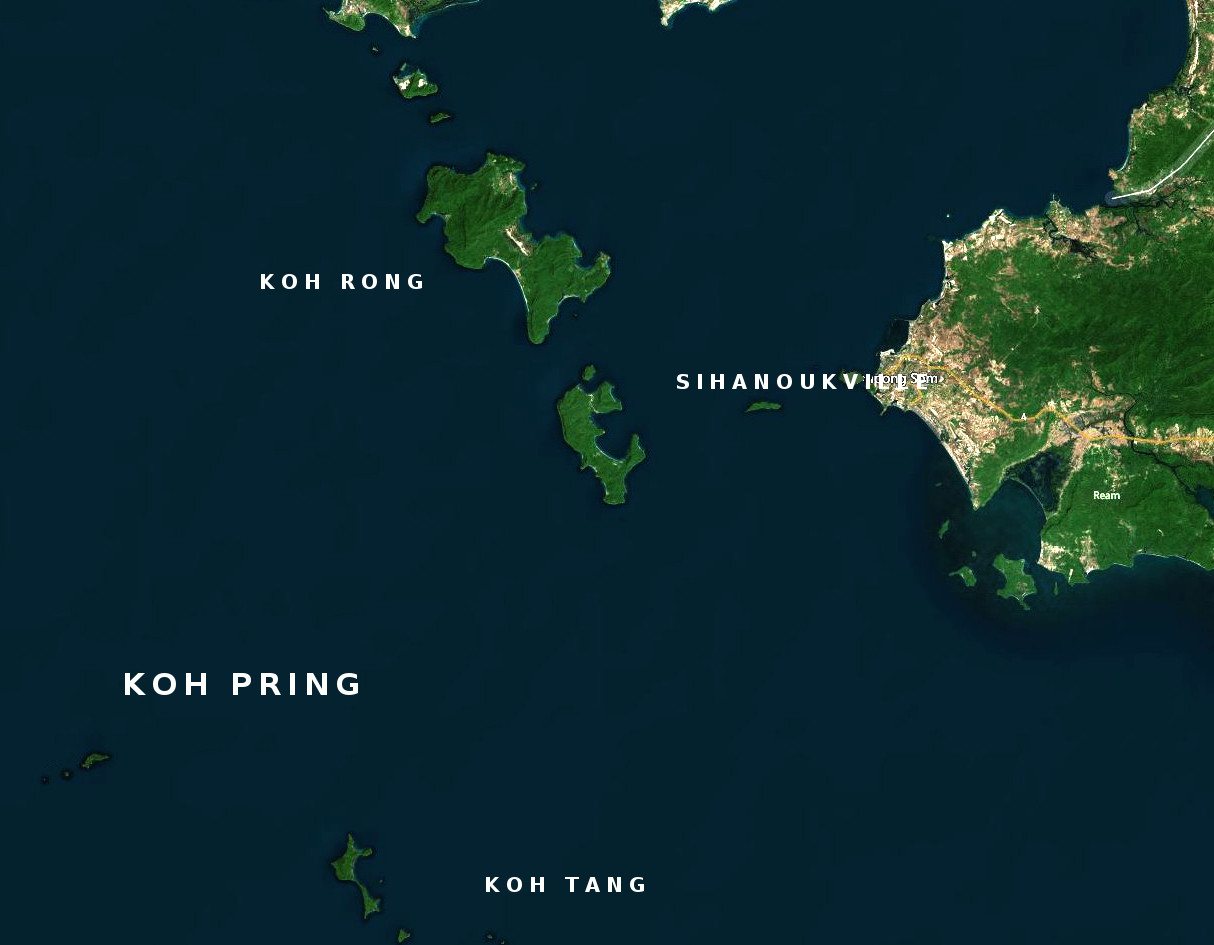
- Koh Pring island off Sihanoukville's coast

- Location within Cambodia

Geography
- Location: Cambodia - South East Asia
- Coordinates: 10°22′N 102°57′E
- Area: 0.778 km^{2} (0.300 sq mi)
- Length: 1.76 km (1.094 mi)
- Width: 0.2–0.7 km (0.12–0.43 mi)
- Coastline: 4.78 km (2.97 mi)

Administration
- Cambodia

Demographics
- Ethnic groups: Khmer

Koh Pring, (Khmer: កោះព្រីង, Jambul Island, Koh Prins(former French name) is a Cambodian island in the gulf of Thailand, 64 km off the coastal city of Sihanoukville. Official sources provide no data of civilian communities on the "Outer Islands". Administration falls to the Cambodian navy, as the island lies within the national marine border in which it represents an isolated outpost.

== Geography ==
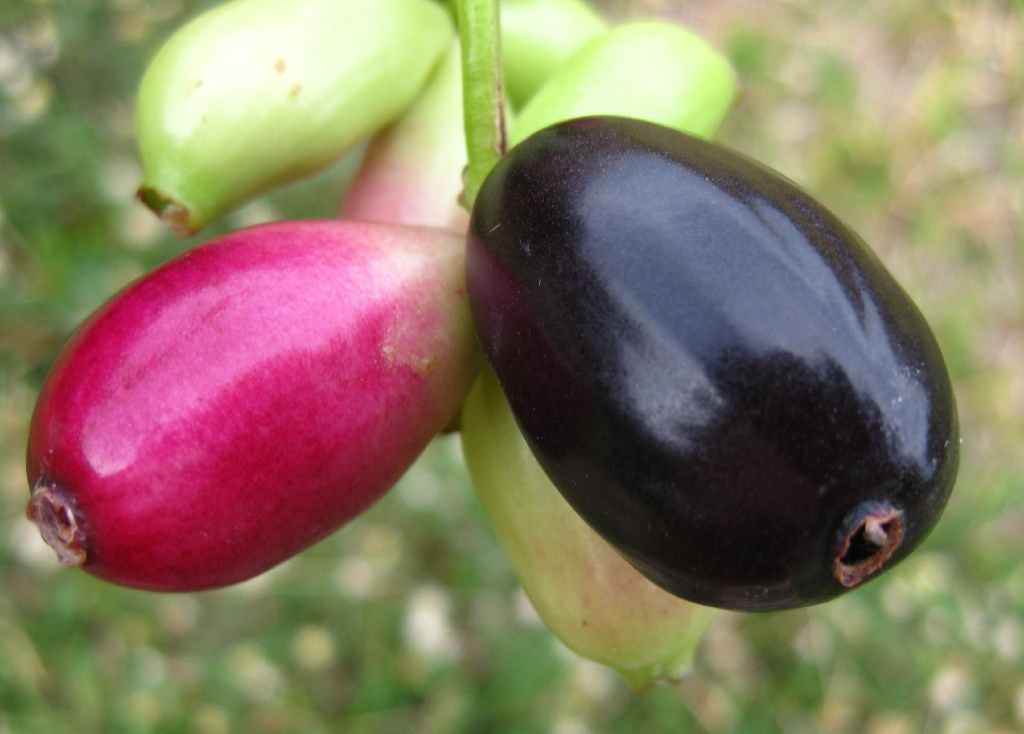
Jambul (Pring) fruits

Koh Pring is in fact the largest island of a tiny archipelago of 3 islands (Koh Pring, Koh Doung and Koh Trangol). Pring - ព្រីង - is Khmer for Jambul (jambolan, jamblang, or jamun), the fruit of an evergreen, flowering tropical tree.

== See also ==
- Sihanoukville
- Koh Rong
- Koh Sdach
- List of islands of Cambodia
- List of Cambodian inland islands
