= Koh Kong (island) =

Island in the Gulf of Thailand

Native name: កោះកុង
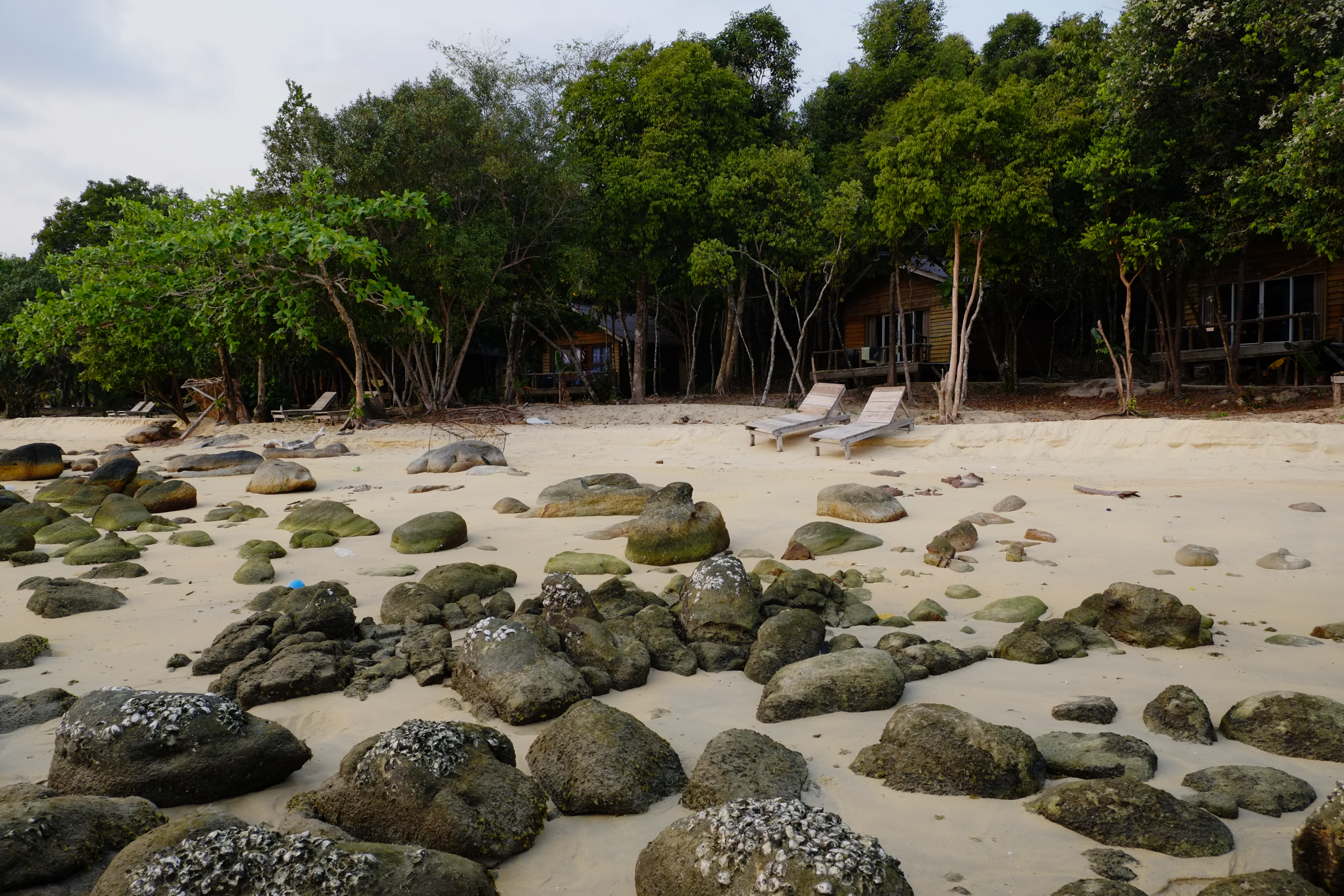
- Beach on Koh Kong island

- Location within Cambodia

Geography
- Location: Cambodia - Southeast Asia
- Coordinates: 11°20′N 103°0′E
- Area: 100 km^{2} (39 sq mi)
- Length: 19.5 km (12.12 mi)
- Width: 5.1–7.2 km (3.2–4.5 mi)
- Coastline: 53 km (32.9 mi)
- Highest point: 360 meters (1,181ft)

Administration
- Cambodia
- Province: Koh Kong

Demographics
- Ethnic groups: Khmer, Vietnamese

Koh Kong (Khmer: កោះកុង), or Outer Koh Kong (Khmer: កោះកុងក្រៅ), is an island in the Gulf of Thailand, in the coastal waters of Cambodia, around 10 km (6 mi) south of Koh Kong town, as it is part of Koh Kong Province. It is Cambodia's largest island.

== Location and description ==
The center of Koh Kong Island (Khmer: កោះកុង; Kaôh Kŏng Krau) is situated around 20 km (12 mi) south-west of Koh Kong town. The island stretches 19.5 km (12 mi) from North to South and 6 km (4 mi) from East to West on average. The strait Passe de Lămdăm that separates the island from the mainland in the north is less than 500 m (1,640 ft) wide. The island's southern tip lies less than 4 km (2 mi) off the mainland, the narrow strait is the gateway to the Bay of Koh Kong (Chhak Kaoh Kong) in the East, which occupies an area of around 135 km^{2} (52 sq mi).

The only settlements are small fishing villages, Alatang on the south-east corner, Phumi Koh Kong on the west coast and Phumi Thmei (Khmer for new village) on the eastern coast. The interior is rather hilly - the highest peak in the north rising up to 360 m (1,181 ft), rugged rock formations create many waterfalls. Rivers that drain the mountains end in freshwater estuaries and countless lagoons, which are flanked by scenic beaches.

== Sleeping ==
The north end is controlled by the military, camping is allowed at your own risk on the 5th and 6th beaches and also at the military post in the village of Alatang.

== Wildlife ==
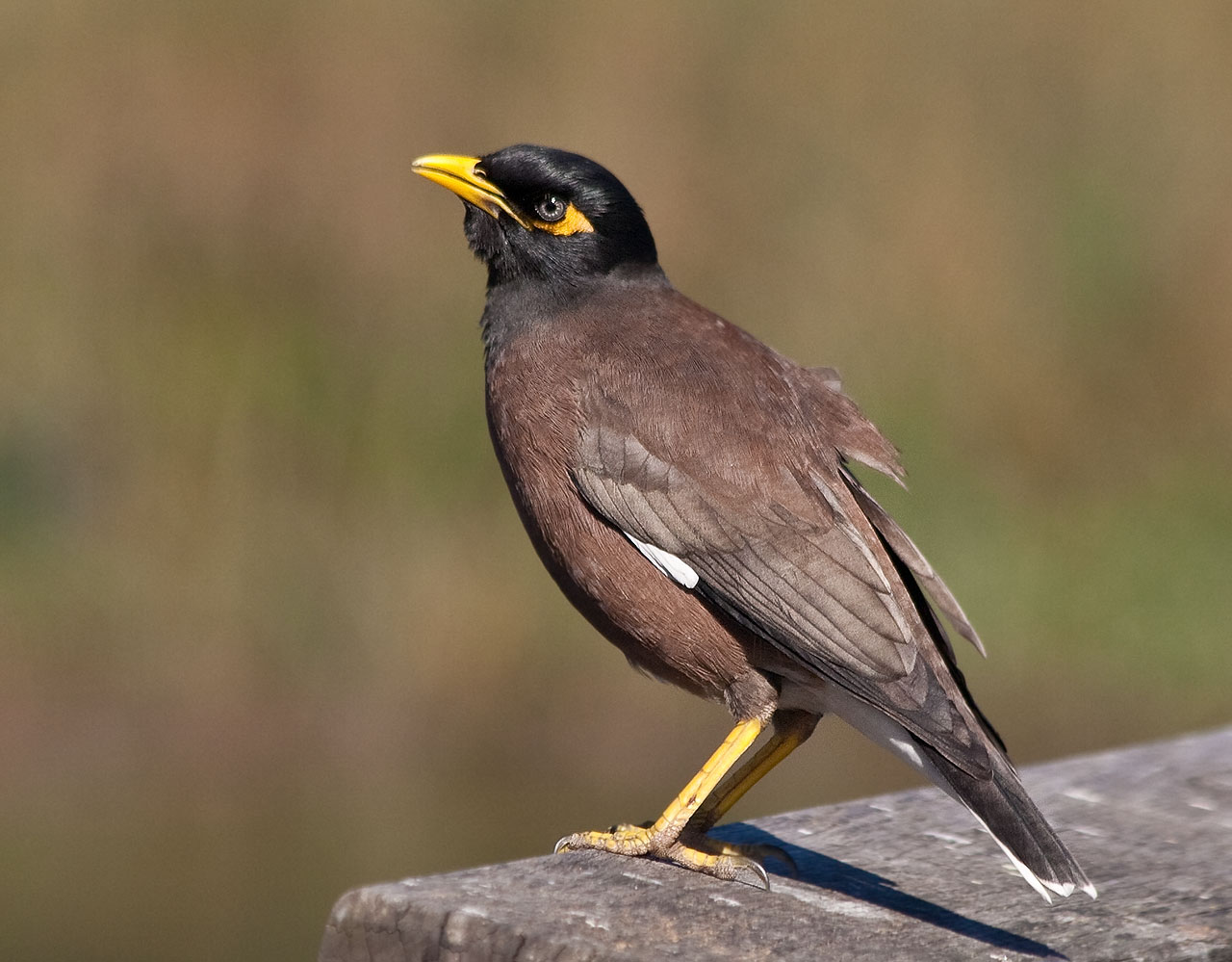
Common Myna

Koh Kong Island is in the much larger Cardamom Rainforest Ecozone, and the island is covered in evergreen tropical rainforest, fed by the annual monsoon from the Gulf of Thailand. Mangroves cover some of the coastal areas and estuaries.

The island is home to a number of mammals such as macaques, wild boar and indigenous squirrels, bird, such as hornbills, mynah and small Psittaciformes. The entire eco-region of Koh Kong remains in a relatively original state and is home to a great variety of reptiles and amphibians, invertebrates, fungi and plants. Large areas of Koh Kong's eastern coast and the Bay of Koh Kong are engulfed in extensive mangrove forests, the basis for various aquatic and marine species. The giant moth Attacus atlas can be found on the island.

== Marine life ==
Under water, coral reefs and swathes of seagrass are scattered across the shallow, and sandy coastal areas, supporting a prolific marine life. It is expected that the waters surrounding the island will be part of a new marine national park in 2021. In June 2020, a committee headed by the Cambodian Minister of Environment was established, on initiative of the Royal Government, tasked with reviewing and overseeing any future construction and development projects on Koh Kong Krao. The committee is needed, as the island is part of a Special Economic Zone (SEZ), encouraging economic development.

The marine fauna around the island includes harmless whale sharks, sea turtles, dugongs, dolphins (endangered Irrawaddy dolphins, finless porpoises, and Chinese white dolphins), Parrot fish, snapper fish, barracuda, king fish, cobia fish, wahoo fish, swordfish, grouper fish, crabs, shrimps, squids.

== See also ==
- Koh Rong
- Koh Sdach
- List of islands of Cambodia
- List of Cambodian inland islands
