= List of islands of Cambodia =

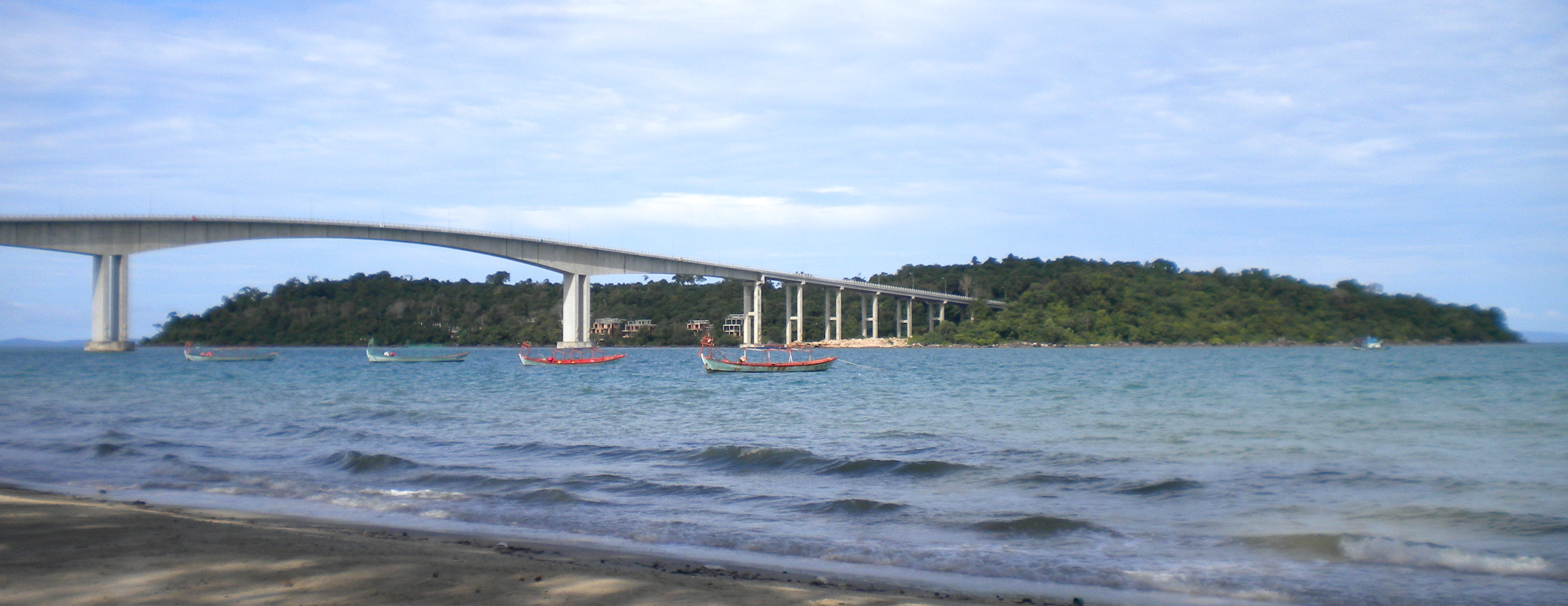
Snake Island, off the coast of Sihanoukville, as seen from Hawaii Beach, October 2014

The following is a list of Cambodia's islands, all situated in the Gulf of Thailand (Khmer: ឈូងសមុទ្រថៃ, Chhungsâmŭtr Thai). All islands are, apart from the group of the outer islands, in relative proximity to the coast and can easily and quickly be reached. The north-westernmost islands near and around the Koh Kong river (Khmer: Prek Kaoh Pao) delta area are to a great extent engulfed in contiguous mangrove marshes and consequently hard to recognize.

Almost all islands have more than one name and there are islands sharing names (e.g. 2 x Koh Moul, 2 x Koh Domloung). Ancient Malay and French colonial names are still being used and/or have merged with Khmer names. Individual and unstandardized Romanization of Khmer writing has resulted in multiple spelling variants of the island's names. Sources, such as Geonames offer several variants. Tables below follow the geography from north-west to south-east.

== Islands off Koh Kong Province/Botum Sakor National Park ==
Name	English Name	Khmer Name	Former French Name	Size	Image
Koh Kong (island)	Outer Koh Kong Island	កោះកុងក្រៅ		105 km^{2}	
Koh Sdach	King Island	កោះស្ដេច		1.1 km^{2}	
Koh Memei/Rokas	Widow island	កោះមេម៉ាយ			
Koh Smach/Samit	Rife Island	កោះស្មាច់		3.4 km^{2}	
Koh Smach Phoumi	Rife Island Village	កោះស្មាច់		0.8 km^{2}	
Koh Ampil Thom	Big Tamarind Island	កោះអំពិលធំ		34.4 ha	
Koh Ampil Kandal	Central Tamarind Island	កោះអំពិលកណ្ដាល		2.6 ha	
Koh Ampil Toch	Small Tamarind Island	កោះអំពិលតូច		11.2 ha	
Koh Moul	Round Island	កោះមុល	Ilot Cone	18.6 ha	
Koh Kapi	"From the" island	កោះកាពី			
Koh Gondol	Mouse/Rat island	កោះកណ្ដុរ		2.4 ha	
Koh Sralau	Sralau tree island	កោះស្រឡៅ	Ile de Koh Sralou	4.2 km^{2}	
Koh Châkrei	Chakrei island	កោះចក្រី		2.9 km^{2}	
Koh Domloung	Potato Island	កោះដំឡូង	Ile Plate	6.5 ha	
Koh Manoah/Kandal	Pineapple/Middle Island	កោះម្នាស់/កណ្តាល	Ile du Milieu	3.9 km^{2}	
	North Island		Ilot Nord	0.153 km^{2}	
Koh Lôy	Pretty Island	កោះឡូយ		13.5 ha	
Koh Navan	Navan island			6.9 km^{2}	
Koh Ta Téam/Vaang	Ancestor Team island	កោះតាទាម	Ile du Chenal	0.6 km^{2}	
Koh Yâr	Porch island	កោះយ៉		1.0 km^{2}	
Koh Kruasah Knong	Inner Family Island	កោះគ្រួសារក្នុង	Îles Koh Kussat	16.0 ha	
Koh Kruasah Krau	Outer Family Island	កោះគ្រួសារក្រៅ	Îles Koh Kussat	12.5 ha	
Koh Kruasah Kandal	Central Family Island	កោះគ្រួសារកណ្ដាល	Îles Koh Kussat	25.5 ha	
Koh Andaug	Turtle Island	កោះអណ្ដើក		6.4 ha	
Koh Khmauch	Ghost Island	កោះខ្មោច		10.9 ha	
Koh Nu	That Island	កោះនោះ			
Rocher Table	Table Rock				
Rocher Kusrovie	Kusrovie Rock				
Rocher Du Branle-bas	Commotion Rock				
Îlots de la Comète	Comet Islets				
Koh Chhan	Table Island	កោះឆាន់		0.5 km^{2}	
Koh Totang	Square island	កោះទទឹង		0.8 km^{2}	
Koh Rokas/Memas	Irregular island	កោះរកាស		1.3 ha	
Koh Pao	Kiddy island	កោះ		18.0 ha	
Koh Sanchaura		កោះ		29.7 ha	

== Islands off Sihanoukville/Krong Preah Sihanouk/Chhak Kampong Saom ==
Name	English Name	Khmer Name	Former French Name	Size	Image
Koh Rong	Shelter island	កោះរ៉ុង		78 km^{2}	
Koh Tuich	Small Island	កោះតូច	Ilot Sud	1.4 ha	
Koh Rong Sanloem	Rong Sanloem island	កោះរុងសន្លឹម		25 km^{2}	
Koh Koun	Child Island	កោះកូន	Ile de Cone	6.9 ha	
Koh Bong Po-oun/Song Saa	Siblings/Lovers Islands	កោះបងកោះប្អូន	Les Frères	6.1 ha	
Koh Chanloh/Kaoh Krobai	Torch/Water-Buffalo Island	កោះចន្លុះ/កោះក្របី	Île du Milieu	1.9 ha	
Kaoh Preus	Deer Island	កោះប្រើស	Île Nord-Ouest	0.5 ha	
Koh Puos	Snake Island	កោះពស់	Île Coudée	1.1 km^{2}	
Koh Dek Koul (Pae)	(Port) Nail Island	កោះដែកគោល	Rocher Carré	0.5 km^{2}	
Koh Russei	Bamboo Island	កោះឫស្សី	Ile Sud-Ouest	1.4 km^{2}	
Koh Ta Kiev	Ancestor Kiev Island	កោះតាគៀវ	Ile de la Baie	6.7 km^{2}	
Koh Kaong Kang/Tass	Mangrove/Disk Island	កោះកោងកាង/ថាស	Ile des Paletuviers	0.9 km^{2}	
Koh Traolach	Melon Island	ត្រឡាច			
Koh Tres/K'teah	Pan Island	កោះខ្ទះ	Ile Ronde	7.5 ha	
Koh Preab	Dove Island	កោះព្រាប	Île du Départ	1.0 ha	
Koh Doung	Coconut Island	កោះដូង		1.9 ha	
Rocher Thmor	Eiffel Rocks		Rocher Eiffel	0.1 ha	

== Islands off Ream National Park ==
Name	English Name	Khmer Name	Former French Name	Size	Image
Koh Thmei	New Island	កោះថ្មី	Ile du Milieu	40.3 km^{2}	
Koh Seh	Horse Island	កោះសេះ	Ile a L’eau	7.7 km^{2}	
Koh Ki	Ki Island	កោះគី		2.2 ha	
Koh Sramauch	Ant Island	កោះស្រម៉ោច		28.6 ha	
Koh Sampoch	Meerkat/Ferret island	កោះសំពោច		0.5 ha	
Koh Dam	Graft island			1.1 km^{2}	

== Islands off Kep ==
Name	English Name	Khmer Name	Former French Name	Size	Image
Koh Angkrang	Weaver ant Island	កោះអង្ក្រង	Ile des Fourmis	6.1 ha	
Koh Ach Seh	Horse manure Island			8.3 ha	
Koh Pou	Pou tree island	កោះពោធិ	Île Pirate du Nord	32.2 ha	
Koh Kras	Dense Island	កោះក្រាស	Île Rocheuse	2.9 ha	
Koh Matei	Kindergarten island	កោះមត្តេយ្យ			
Koh Makprang	Makprang fruit island	កោះម៉ាកប្រាង			
Koh Sngout	Dry Island	កោះស្ងួត			
Koh Kok	Heron/Egret island	កោះកុក			
Koh Svay	Mango Island	កោះស្វាយ		6.3 ha	
Koh Tbal	Mill grinder/Mortar Island	កោះត្បាល់		14.7 ha	
Koh Thonsay	Rabbit Island	កោះទន្សាយ	Koh Antay	1.8 km^{2}	
Roche Rosita	Rosita rock		Roche Rosita		

== The outer Islands ==
Name	English Name	Khmer Name	Former French Name	Size	Image
Koh Tang	"Legend" or Display island	កោះតាង		5.9 km^{2}	
Koh Moul/Tuich	Round/Small Island	កោះមូល		1.9 ha	
Koh Domloung	Potato Island	កោះដំឡូង		46.7 ha	
Koh Trangol	Shaved Island	កោះត្រង៉ោល		1.0 ha	
Koh Thee Moy	First Island	កោះទីមួយ	Îlots Sud-Est	2.0 ha	
Koh Thee Pee	Second Island	កោះទីបីរ	Îlots Sud-Est	5.4 ha	
Koh Doung	Coconut Island	កោះដូង		8.3 ha	
Koh Pring	Jambul Island	កោះព្រីង	ile Prins	0.7 km^{2}	
Koh Poulo Wai 1	Poulo Wai islands	កោះពូលូវៃ		2.1 km^{2}	
Koh Poulo Wai 2	Poulo Wai islands	កោះពូលូវៃ		1.7 km^{2}	
Ilot Veer	Crawl islet	កោះវារ		6.2 ha	
Koh Veal	Field island	កោះវាល		51,016.88 m^{2}	

== Maps ==
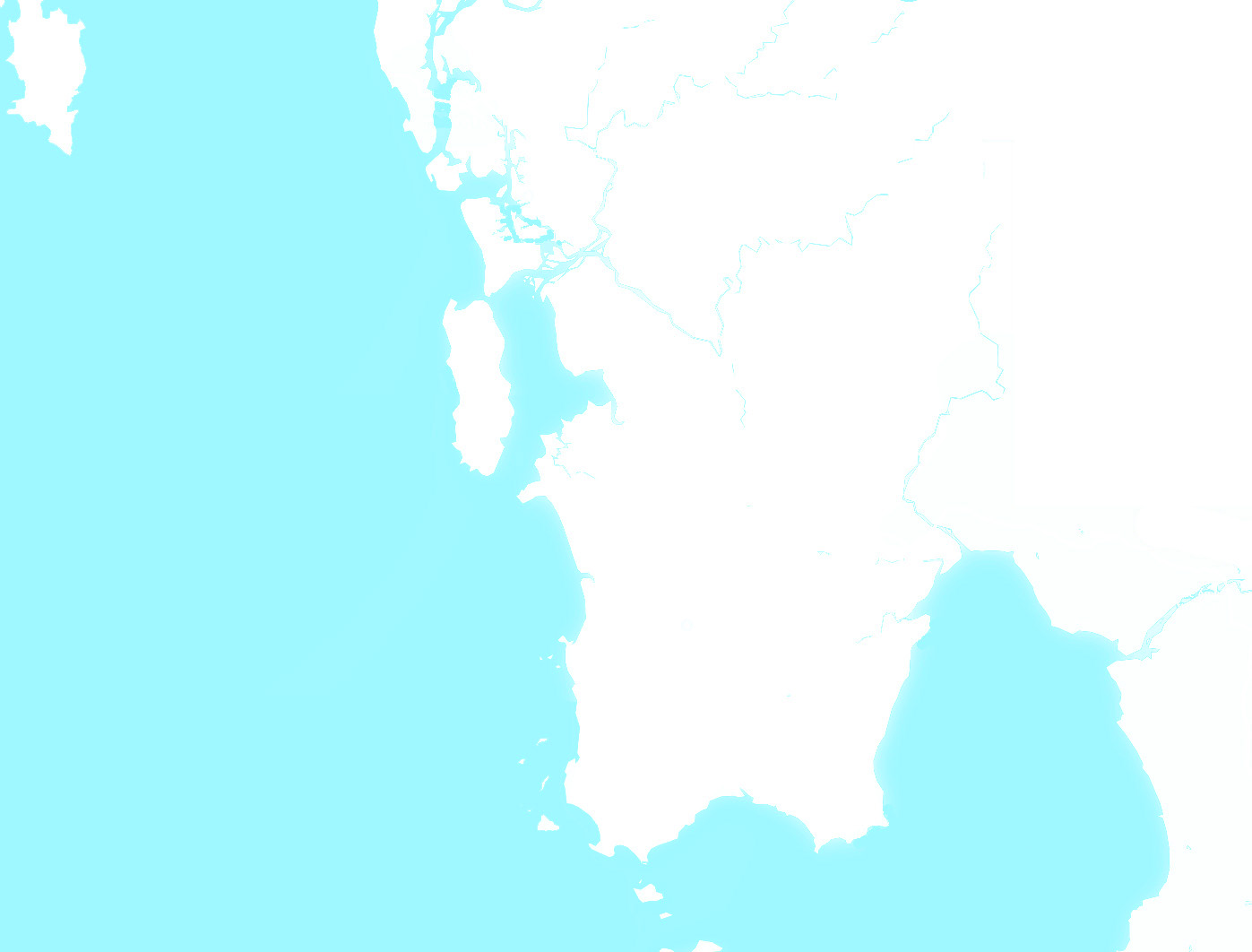
Cambodia's islands - northern part
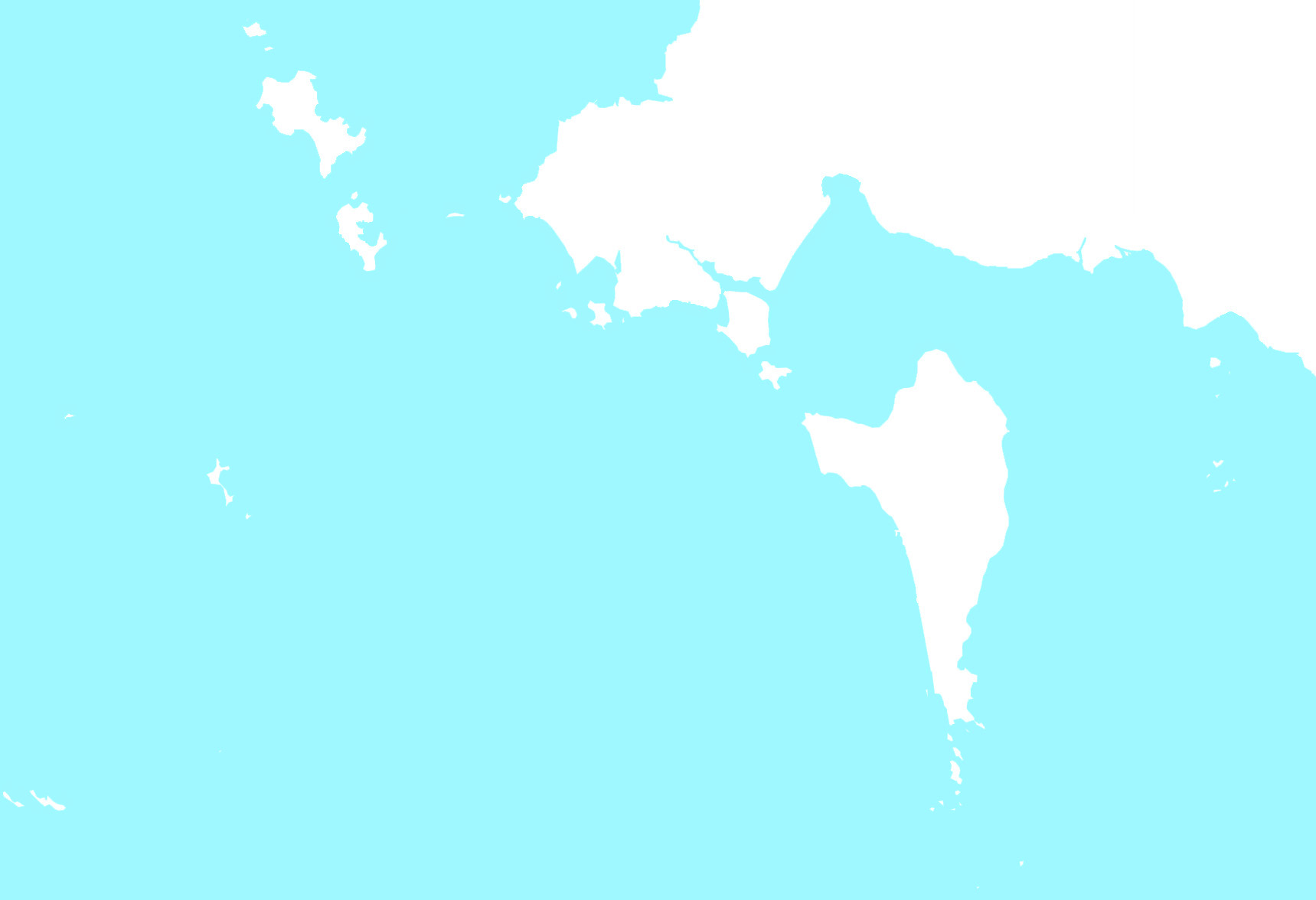
Cambodia's islands - southern part

== See also ==
- Sihanoukville (city)
- List of Cambodian inland islands
- List of islands
- Gulf of Thailand
- Geography of Cambodia
