= Koh Ta Kiev =

Cambodian island in the Gulf of Thailand

Native name: កោះរ៉ុង
- Location within Cambodia

Geography
- Location: Cambodia - South East Asia - Gulf of Thailand
- Coordinates: 10°29′31″N 103°35′42″E
- Area: 6.7 km^{2} (2.6 sq mi)
- Length: 4.4 km (2.73 mi)
- Width: 1.4–2.9 km (0.87–1.80 mi)
- Coastline: 13.4 km (8.33 mi)

Administration
- Cambodia
- Province: Sihanoukville
- City: Kampong Saom

Demographics
- Ethnic groups: Khmer

Koh Ta Kiev (Khmer: កោះតាគៀវ, “Ancestor Kiev’s Island” (named "Ile de la Baie" during the French colonial period) is the biggest of a small group of Cambodian islands situated 4 km off Otres beach, Sihanoukville City, and 1 km off the coast of Ream National Park, Sihanoukville Province. Its predominantly forested area of 6.70 km^{2} (3 sq mi) is mostly flat with hills at some points.

There is also a small fishing village on the island's east side. Apart from the Cambodian Navy, which maintains a small base with a port, no infrastructure exists.

Three beaches attract travelers and tourists. There are a few guesthouses and a campsite.

== See also ==
- Koh Seh
- Koh Russei
- Ream National Park
- List of islands of Cambodia
- Sihanoukville (city)
