= Knarrholmen =

Island in Gothenburg Municipality, Sweden

Coordinates: 57°37′20″N 11°49′40″E

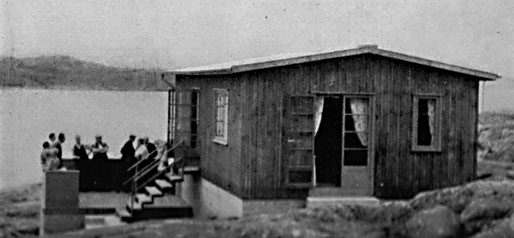
Photo of a building on the Knarrholmen Island, Gothenburg Archipelago

Knarrholmen is a small island in the Southern Gothenburg Archipelago of Sweden.
