= Koh Romdual =

Koh Romdual is an island approximately 20 kilometers outside of Phnom Penh, Cambodia. It is located in the Tonle Bassac river at 11°23′54″N 105°00′48″E. Koh Romdual has undergone name changes, and is commonly referred to as Kor Island or Koh Kor.

== History ==
The island exceptionally small (3 km x 1 km) and was used as a main killing field during the Khmer Rouge era. It is infamous for being a known torture and execution center for those that needed to be "re-educated." The island remained a re-education center through the 1980s and 1990s and was used as a detention center for women. It was eventually used as a general prison for mentally ill and homeless people.

== Controversy ==
The conditions of the prison were dismal and drew the attention of many NGOs and the United Nations. The detention center was shut down in 2008 by the United Nations after they cited numerous human rights violations.
