= Koipsi =

Village in Estonia

- Village
- Location in Estonia
- Coordinates: 59°32′42″N 25°16′13″E
- Country: Estonia
- County: Harju County
- Municipality: Jõelähtme Parish

Population (0)
  - Total: 0

Koipsi is an island and a village in Jõelähtme Parish, Harju County in northern Estonia. If in 2010 it had a population of 1 (as of 1 January 2010), today it is uninhabited.
