= Koh Rong Sanloem =

Cambodian island in the Gulf of Thailand

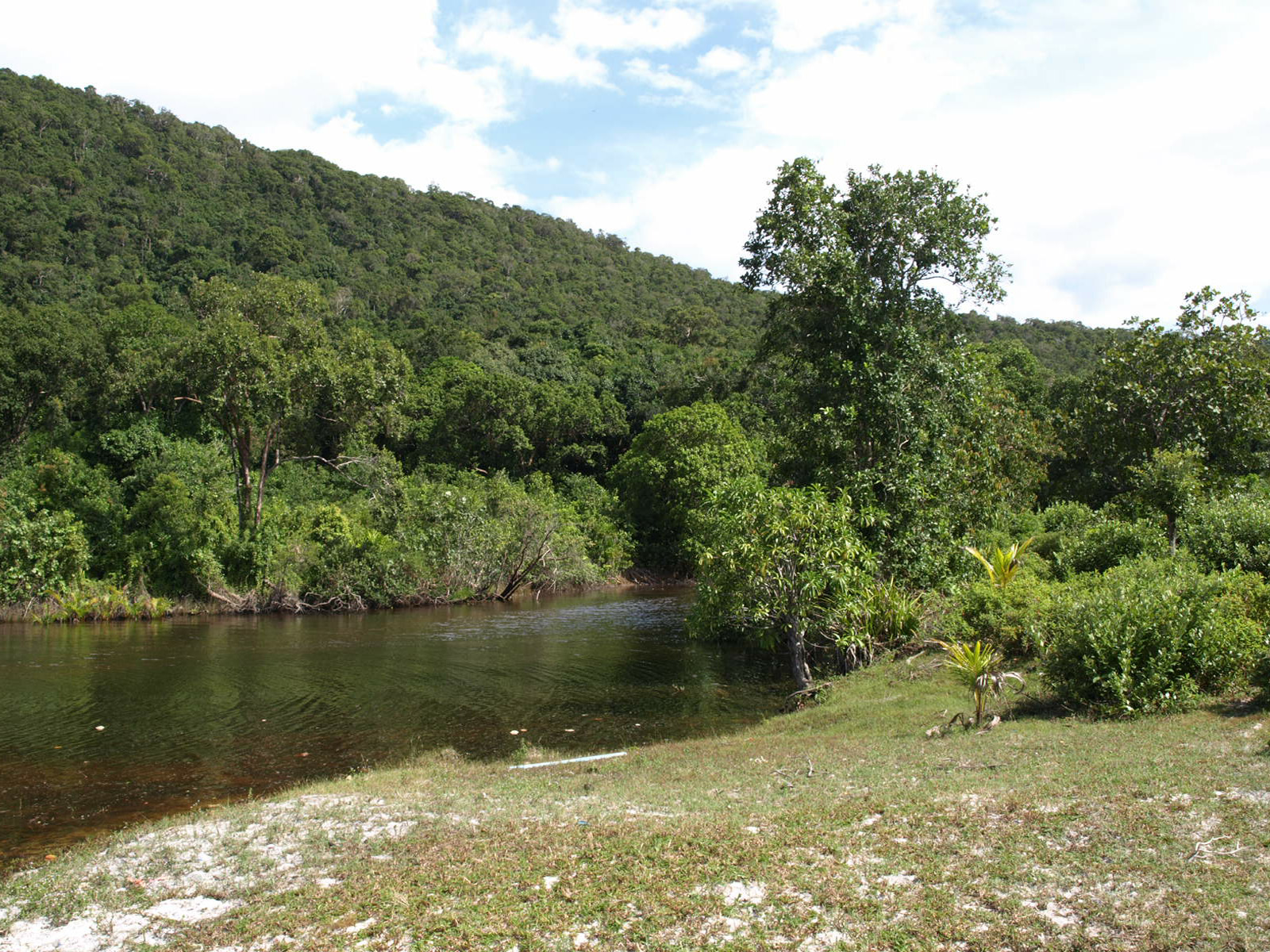
- Koh Rong Sanloem estuary

- Location within Cambodia

Geography
- Location: Southeast Asia
- Coordinates: 10°35′10″N 103°17′45″E
- Area: 24.5 km^{2} (9.5 sq mi)
- Length: 9.5 km (5.9 mi)
- Width: 1–4.8 km (0.62–2.98 mi)
- Coastline: 37 km (23 mi)
- Highest point: 210 meters (689ft)

Administration
- Cambodia
- Province: Sihanoukville

Demographics
- Population: 558 (2019 census)
- Languages: Khmer
- Ethnic groups: Khmer

Koh Rong Sanloem (Khmer: កោះរ៉ុងសន្លឹម, romanized: Kǎh Rŏng Sǎnluĕm, [kɑh.roŋ.sanlɨm]) is an island off the coast of Sihanoukville, Cambodia, 4 km (2 mi) south of Koh Rong. It is around 9 km (6 mi) long (north to south), 4 km (2 mi) wide (east to west) and 1 km (1 mi) wide at its narrowest point. Its distance from the local port of Sihanoukville is 25 km (16 mi) (beeline) and 23 km (14 mi) (beeline) from the Serendipity/Ochheuteal beach pier.

Koh Rong Sanloem is part of Koh Rong City and lies within Sihanoukville Province in Commune 5 (Koh Rong). It is also part of Koh Rong Marine National Park that was established in 2018. Alongside its sister-island Koh Rong it has developed into a popular holiday destination for individual travelers. With respect to the island's very tiny population, by 2014 the tourism sector became the core of the economy.

In 1975 the crew of SS Mayaguez was shipped to Koh Rong Sanloem, detained and interrogated by Khmer Rouge soldiers during the Mayaguez incident.

== Etymology ==
The word "Sanloem" translates to: 1. drowsiness and to: 2. far out and hard to discern, in a wider sense. Inconsistencies on how to spell the island's name in its Latinized version date back to the 19th century. The first controversial spelling variants were issued by map makers during French rule. Alternatives have since become widespread and are in common usage. Often confusion ensues as Google Maps offers the phonetically most consistent variant, whereas Google Search redirects to an alternative.

== Geography ==
The island resembles its northern sister, Koh Rong, in many ways, although it has noticeably less landmass in relation to its coastline. The terrain is predominantly hilly with a few mountains of moderate size (e.g. La Chameau - The camel) and a maximum elevation of 210 m (689 ft) in the north-west. The interior was almost entirely covered in dense jungle. The coastline is characterized by a succession of sandstone rock formations and beautiful beaches. There are three yellow sand beaches at the island's long western coast. Its eastern side, facing towards the mainland and less exposed to the weather and the monsoon, is characterized by bays and headlands. The crescent-shaped Saracen Beach bay has an inner diameter of around 3 kilometers. Saracen bay got its name from a British survey brig, HMS Saracen, that charted the area in the late nineteenth century. North of the island lies the uninhabited Koh Koun island, followed by Koh Rong.

== Settlements and infrastructure ==
The main administrative post is at the north of the island, called M'pai Bai (which means Village 23 in Khmer). There used to be a basic road network, built during the period of the French Protectorate, which is by now almost completely overgrown with vegetation. The sole reminder of this period is a lighthouse at the island's southern tip, which now serves as a semi military base. Depending on the season, some structures that resemble a landing field near the light house are still recognizable.

Western side of the island has many new fairly isolated resorts. Most developed is the Saracen Bay area. The main Saracen beach has several resorts in close proximity to each other.

Southern side of the island consist of Sandy Beach and freshly plowed road network connecting to the Saracen Bay area. Sandy Beach has 3 resort Bodega, Tube and Sandy Beach Bungalows. The roads are not paved and are already suffering fair erosion from rains.

Most transport is done by boat, although the island's very narrow center permits water buffalo carts to operate. Koh Rong Sanloem is not connected to the main power grid and each resort generates its own electricity via generator or solar installation.

The island is home to Cambodian Navy base. Main installation is on Saracen Bay area, however, there are many smaller outposts dotted in various locations of the island. Administration of the island has been handed over to state operated Cambodian Development Corporation who subsequently has granted a concession and development rights to Emario Corporation to most of the island.

== Tourism ==
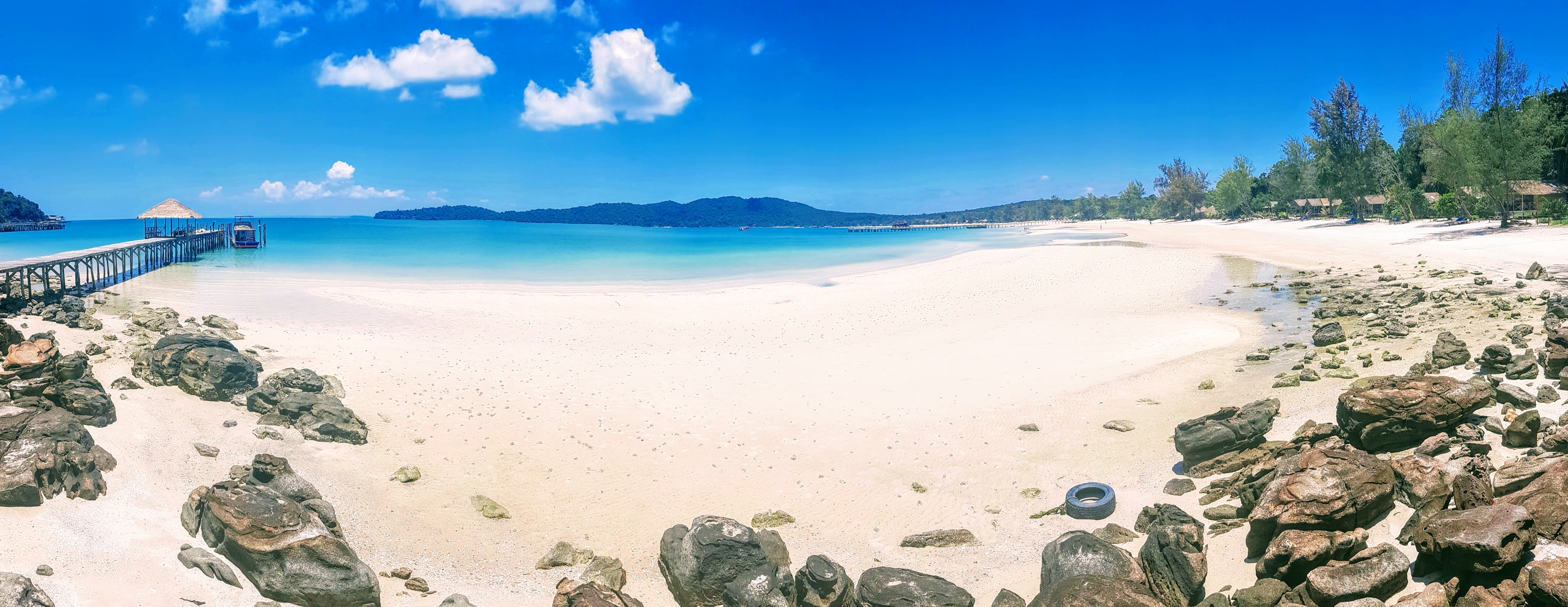
Views over the ocean at Koh Rong Sanloem in Cambodia

As of 2017, Saracen Bay with its white sand beach has established itself as the main tourist area on Koh Rong Sanloem, with numerous bungalow and villa resorts. Accommodation and prices range from cheap dorm beds to modern villas with air-conditioning, wide-screen TV's, comfortable beds, and en-suite bathrooms with a hot shower.

Other notable tourist destinations include ‘Lazy Beach’, ‘Sunset Beach’ (located on the western side of the island) and at the north of the island quaint little village M'Pai Bai (Village 23 in khmer).

M'pai Bai is somewhat cheaper than other locations. The beach is with brownish-yellow color sand. Before Covid pandemic the village had a good selection of family run guest houses and hostels, however, majority have closed. Within walking distance are other beaches, a small waterfall at the top of the hill and another one hidden away.

Regular ferry service from Sihanoukville is provided to Saracen Bay and M'pai Bai. Saracen Bay has many piers, most notable Soon Noeng, Orchid and Freedom. Freedom pier is used only in case of heavy waves. In case you require pickup from the pier you may want to inform the resort which ferry company you are travelling with. M'Pai Bai has only one pier, but only some ferry companies stop at M'Pai Bai on some trips.

Following ferry companies operate from Sihanoukville: Island Speedferry Cambodia, GTVC, Buva Sea. The price is fixed by government at $22 for round trip and $12 one way. They all depart from GTVC pier, which is located next to the Sihanoukville Autonomous port. Some bus operators (Larrita) can bring you direct to the GTVC pier from Phnom Penh. The ferry companies have various style of boats. Large catamarans permit travel in all weather conditions, small boats which are more appropriate for river or lake. It is recommended to check the weather and customer ratings before you book. The ferry can take you from 40 minutes to 2 hours to reach the island. The time will depend on the route. The ferries service both islands (Koh Rong and Koh Rong Sanloem) on the same go and decide on the route based on the number of customers on each location.

There is a supply boat departing from Pier 52 (aka Bora pier) which is accepting travelers and the cost is approximately half the price.

Currently there are no banks or ATMs on Koh Rong Sanloem, however, many locations offer cash out services charged to credit cards. Also, most businesses accept credit cards. If you bring cash then small denominations are appreciated as it can be difficult to give change for large bills.

== Wildlife ==
The island's formidable jungle is the ideal habitat for a great variety of endemic invertebrate species. Vertebrates are less abundant and, typically for island populations, are small in comparison. Amphibians and reptiles are the most numerous and the island's brooks, ponds and streams are home to a variety of small freshwater fish. Birds include the great hornbill, the kingfisher and the osprey. There is an aggressive group of macaques roaming the island. Rodents are very common as a consequence of human activities. Small reefs and the rocky surface of the surrounding waters are home to a remarkable variety of marine species. Divers and snorkelers regularly emphasize the abundance of delicate miniature eco-systems, seahorses and nudibranches.

== Gallery ==
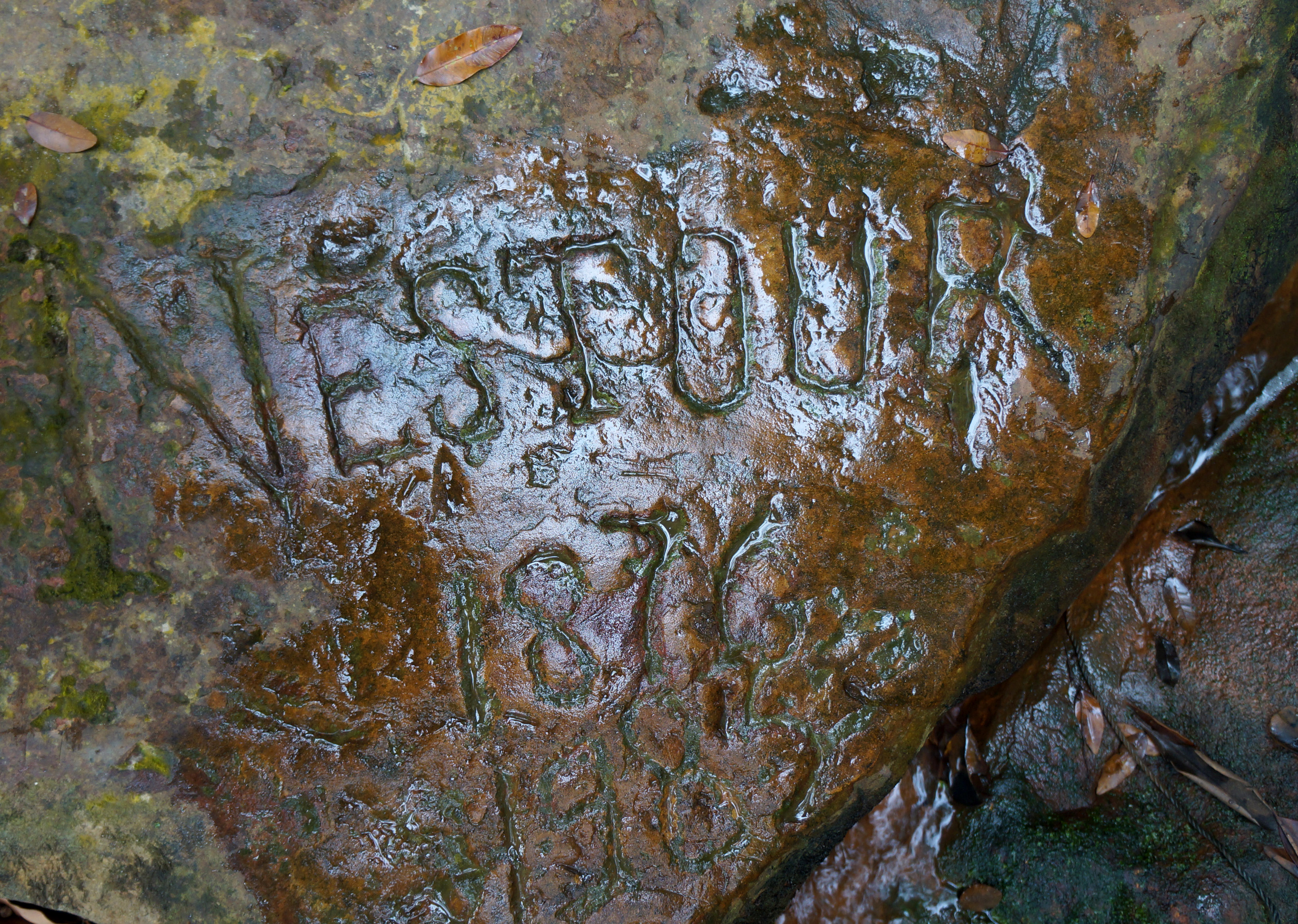
"Nestour 1876"

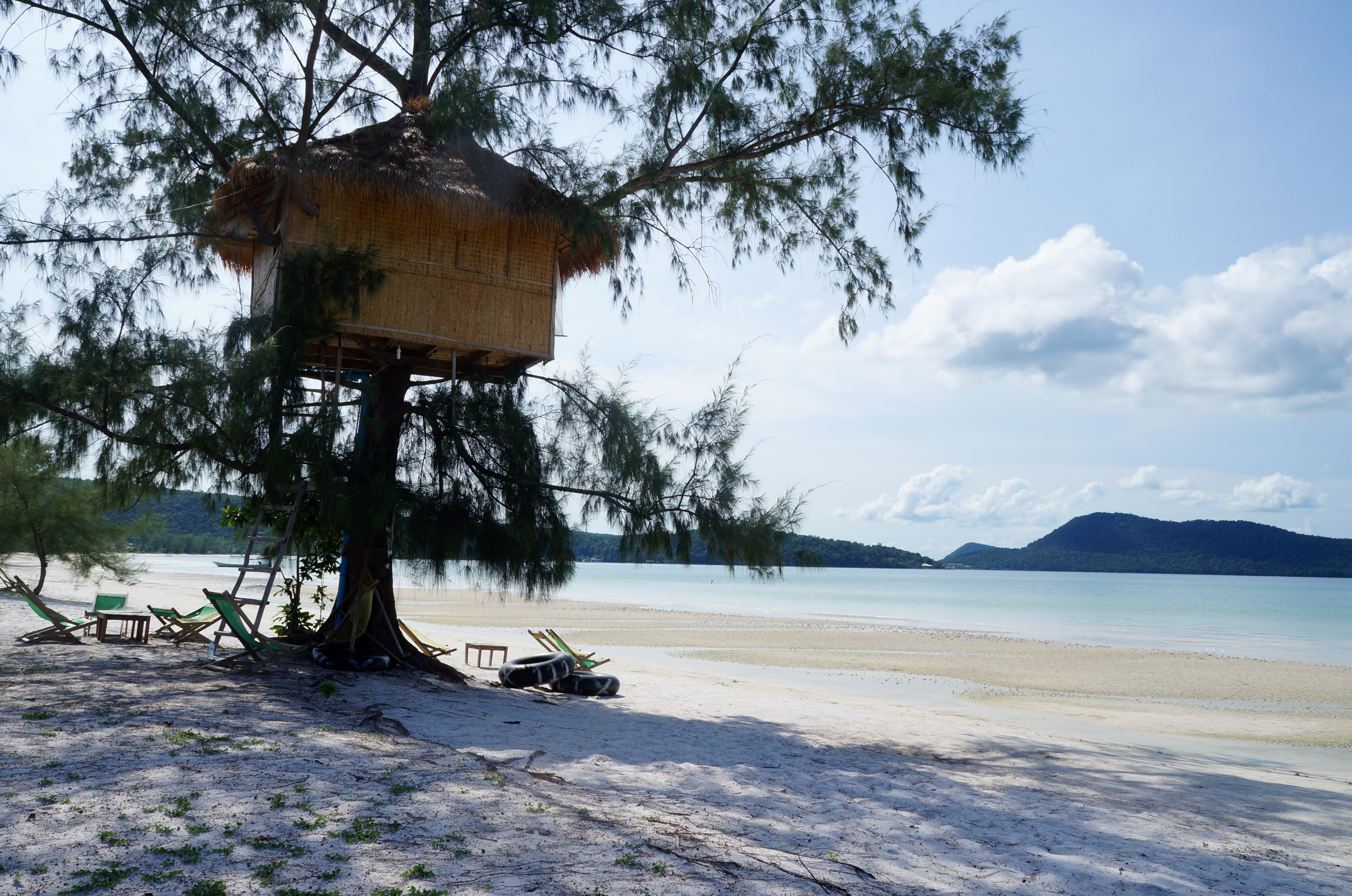
beach tree house at Saracen bay

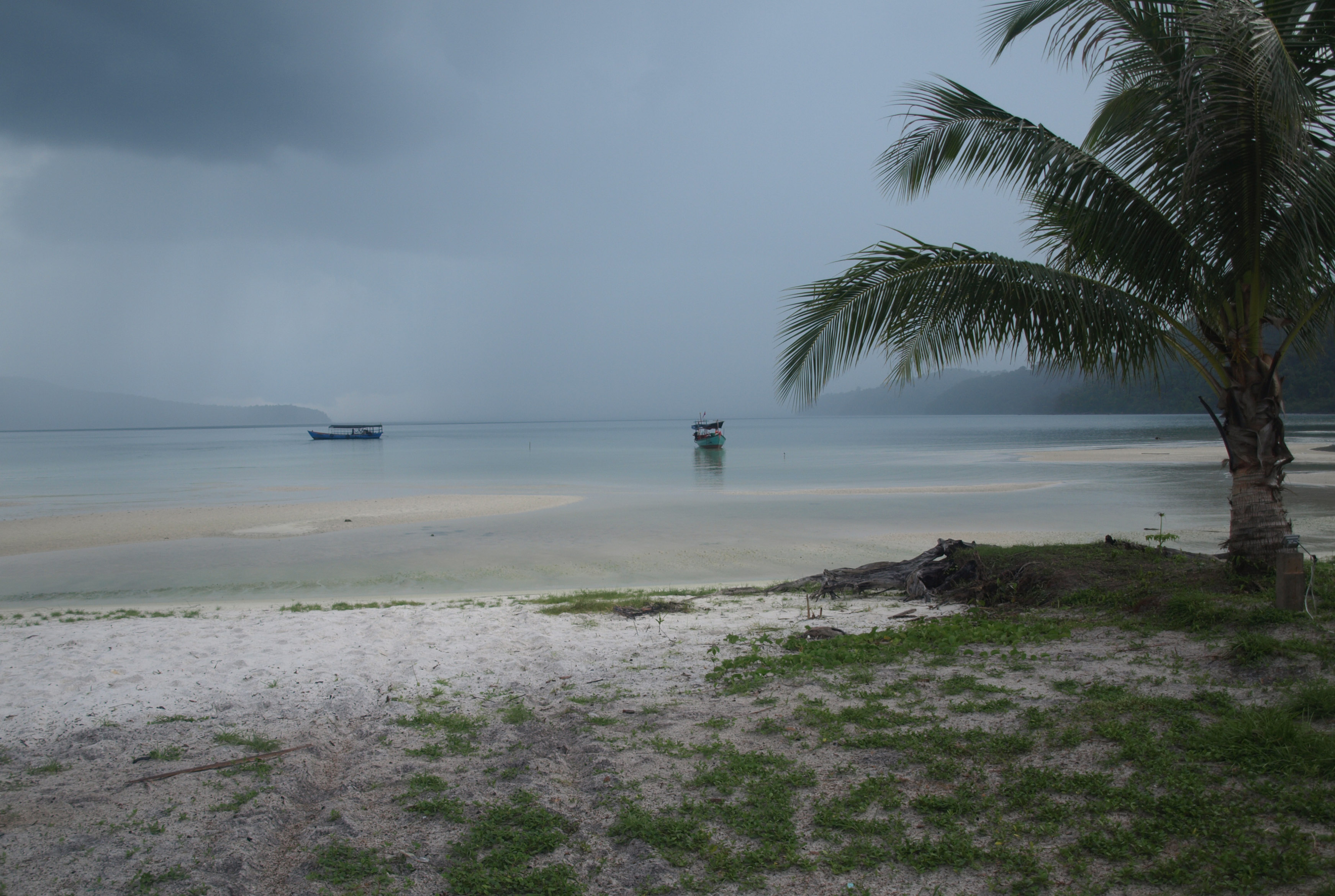
Koh Rong Sanloem during rainy season 2014

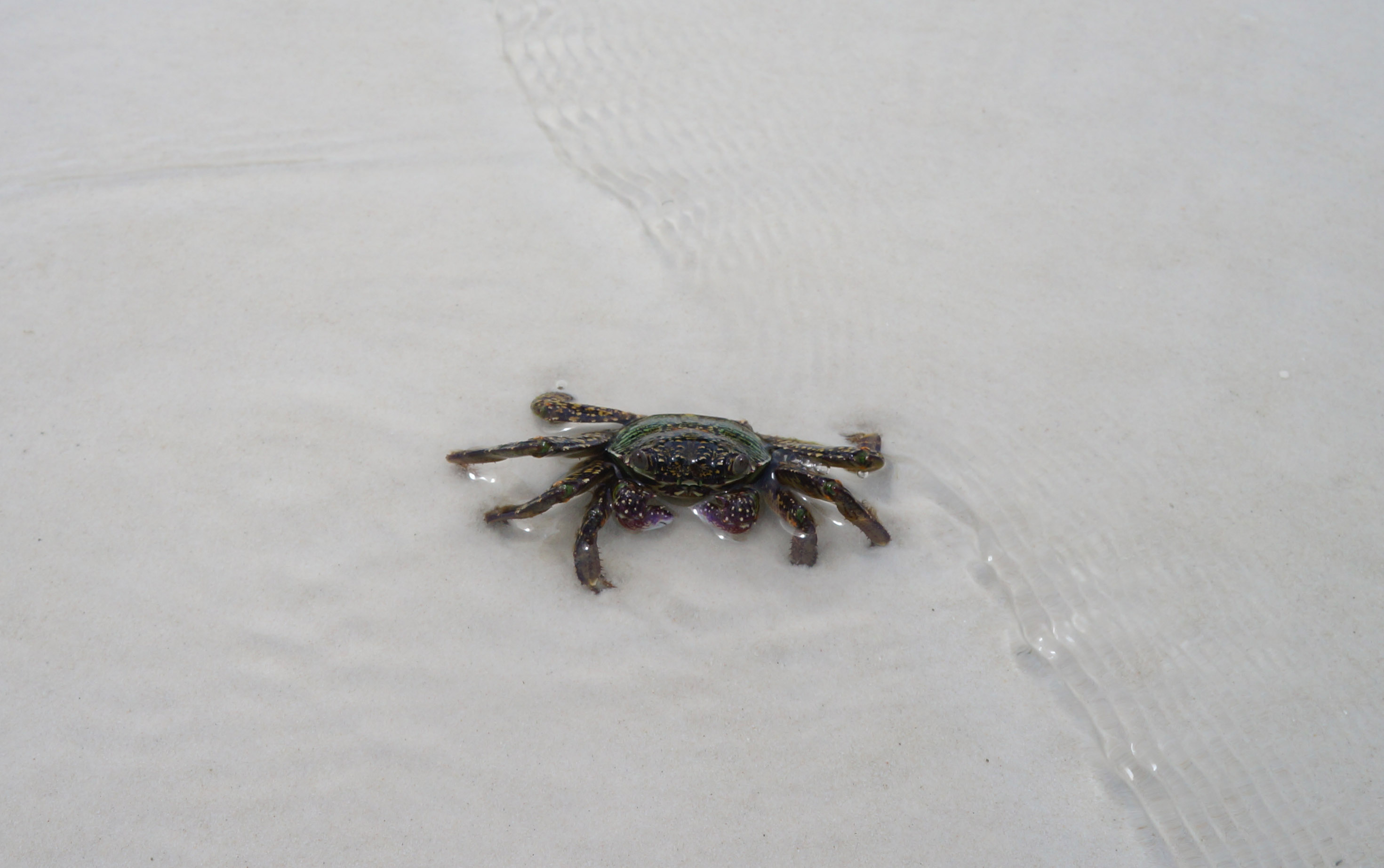
crab on Saracen Bay Beach

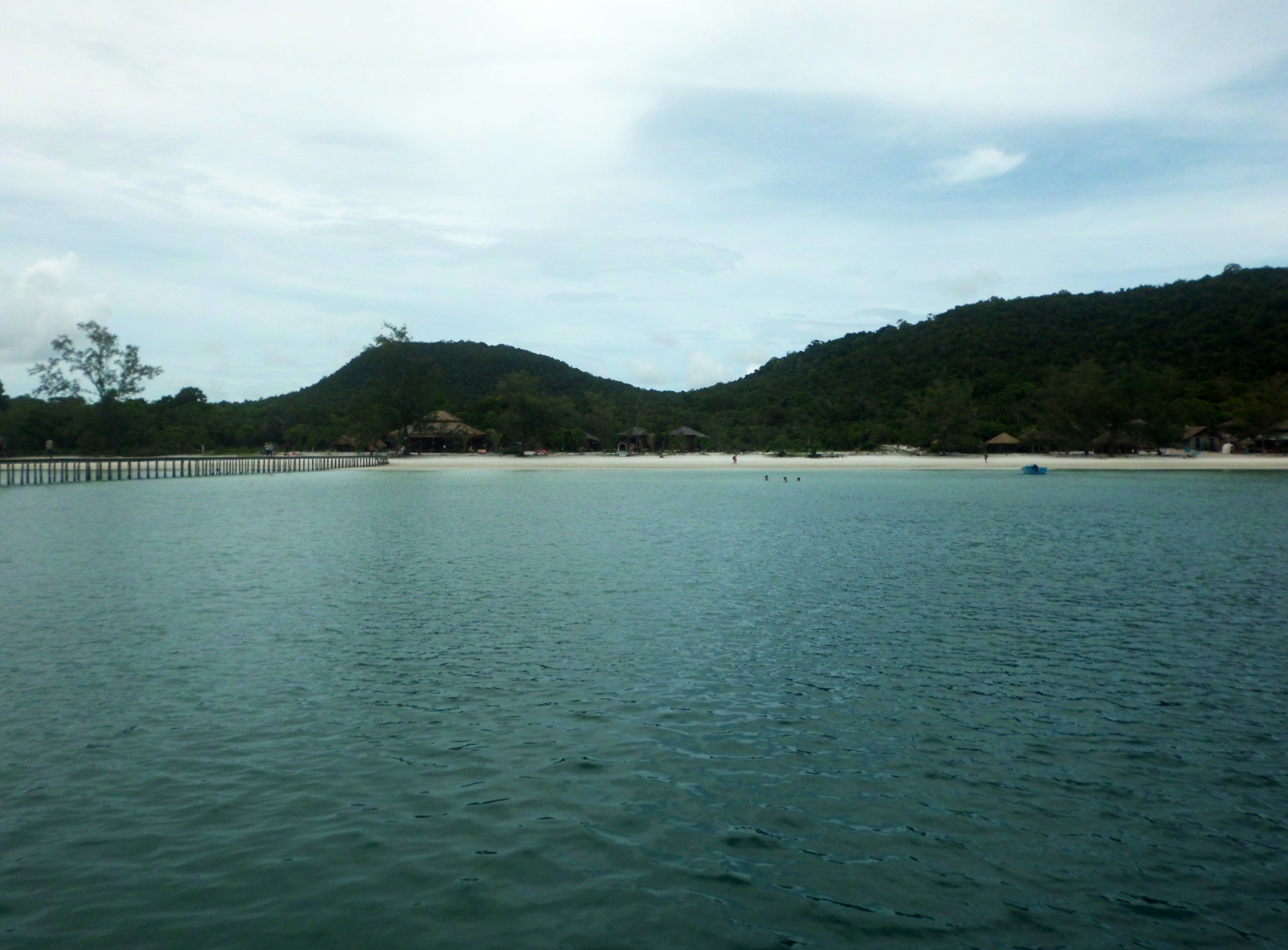
Mont Chameau (camel)

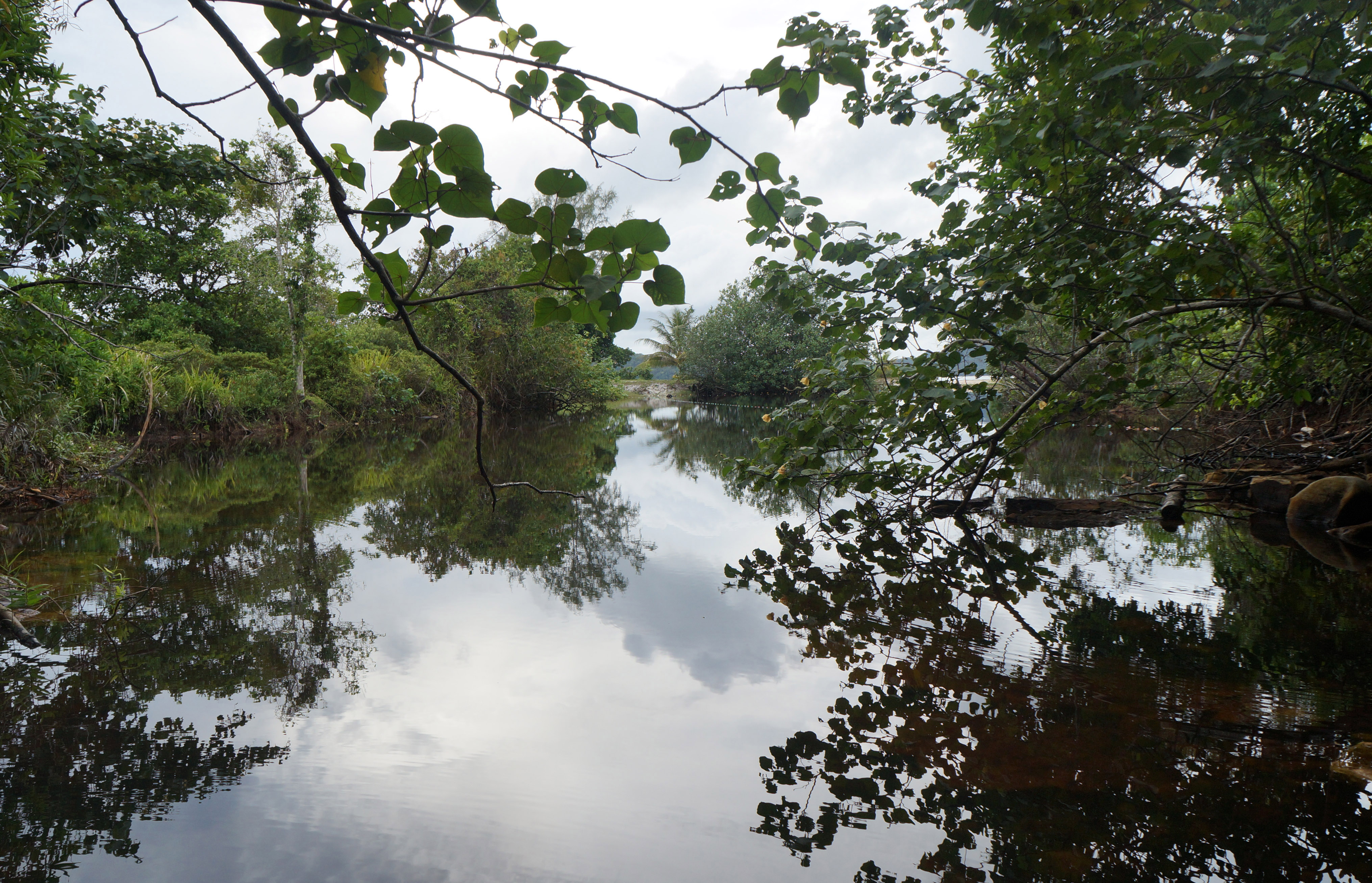
Saracen Bay Beach lagoon

== See also ==
- Sihanoukville
- Koh Rong
- Koh Sdach
- Koh Pring
- List of islands of Cambodia
- List of Cambodian inland islands
