= Koh Sdach =

Island in the Gulf of Thailand

Native name: កោះស្តេច
- Location within Cambodia

Geography
- Location: Cambodia - Southeast Asia
- Coordinates: 10°56′N 103°4′E
- Area: 1.8 km^{2} (0.69 sq mi)
- Length: 2.8 km (1.74 mi)
- Width: 0.6–1 km (0.37–0.62 mi)
- Coastline: 6.6 km (4.1 mi)

Administration
- Cambodia
- Province: Koh Kong
- District: Kiri Sakor

Demographics
- Ethnic groups: Khmer, Chinese,

Additional information
- Time zone: Indochina Time (UTC+07:00)

Koh Sdach (Khmer: កោះស្តេច, romanized: Kaôh Sdéch; lit. 'King's Island') is a Cambodian island located in the Gulf of Thailand, around 1.5 km (1 mi) off the coast of Botum Sakor national park, in the Kiri Sakor district in Koh Kong province, Cambodia. It belongs to a small archipelago of 12 islands, all in relative proximity to each other and to the main land. A fishing community inhabits the island, with people of Khmer, Chinese. The village stretches along the east side of the island; to the west there is a small Khmer run bungalow guesthouse; at the southern end of the island lies a luxurious holiday resort. Koh Sdach has two beaches, one to the south and one westerly facing.

== Geography ==
Koh Sdach is the capital island of the Koh Sdach archipelago. The bean-shaped island stretches from North to South on a length of around 2.8 km (2 mi), it is rather flat and generally forested. Natural jungle has been replaced by coconut trees and forest crops for commercial purposes. Settlements are mainly in the North, while the southern third is almost non-populated. The tiny Ghost Island/Koh Khmauch (កោះខ្មោច) - 500 metres (1,600 ft) east to west and 300 metres (980 ft) north to south - lies just about 250 metres (820 ft) west off its southern end.

== Community ==
As in most of Cambodia, the government is largely nonfunctional even to the extent that the de facto currency is the US DOLLAR. A large portion of the economy is of a subsistence nature with a large reliance on fishing. Roughly 70% of the working population are fishermen with most of the rest being farmers or small-time businessmen. Most of the fish that is caught is sold to Thailand.

== Legend ==
According to legend, there once was a king who commanded an army on the island. Because there was no fresh water, the king searched everywhere to find some. At last he found a rock near the sea. Thinking the rock might contain water; the king drew his sword and split open the rock, releasing an endless flow of water that local people still use today.

== See also ==
- Koh Rong
- Koh Rong Sanloem
- List of islands of Cambodia
- List of Cambodian inland islands
- Koh Kong
