= Koh Rong =

Cambodian island in the Gulf of Thailand

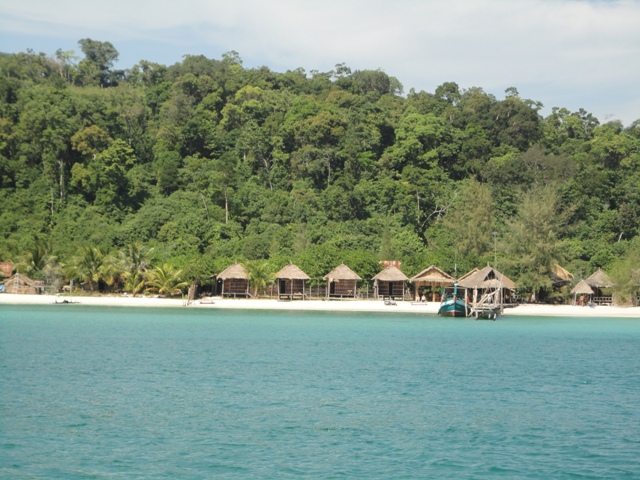
- Bungalow colony at Sok San Beach

- Location within Cambodia

Geography
- Location: Southeast Asia
- Coordinates: 10°43′N 103°15′E
- Area: 78 km^{2} (30 sq mi)
- Length: 15 km (9.3 mi)
- Width: 3–9 km (1.9–5.6 mi)
- Coastline: 61 km (37.9 mi)
- Highest point: 316 meters

Administration
- Cambodia
- Province: Sihanoukville
- Largest settlement: Koh Rong

Demographics
- Population: 4,000 (2019 census)
- Languages: Khmer
- Ethnic groups: Khmer

Koh Rong (Khmer: កោះរ៉ុង, Kaôh Rŏng [kɑh roŋ]) is an island in Preah Sihanouk province, Cambodia. It is the second largest island of Cambodia and one of the islands within the Koh Rong Marine National Park. Koh Rong was established as a commune in 2000, and became a city in 2019. Several seasons of the reality television series Survivor have been filmed on Koh Rong. In 2026, Long Beach on Koh Rong received international recognition after being ranked among the Top 10 beaches in the world by The World’s 50 Best Beaches.

Located about 25 km (16 mi) from Sihanoukville, the island has an area of approximately 78 km^{2} (30 sq mi) and 43 km (27 mi) of its entire coastline of 61 km (38 mi) are beaches. Four village communities exist on the island: Koh Touch, Doeum D'keuw, Prek Svay and Sok San. The island is a popular local tourism destination with numerous hotels, resorts and guesthouses.

== Etymology ==
The word Rong might refer to an old term for "cave" or "tunnel" (Khmer: រូង, Rung [ruːŋ]). It can also refer to the Old Khmer word for shelter, adding up to Shelter Island.

== Geography ==
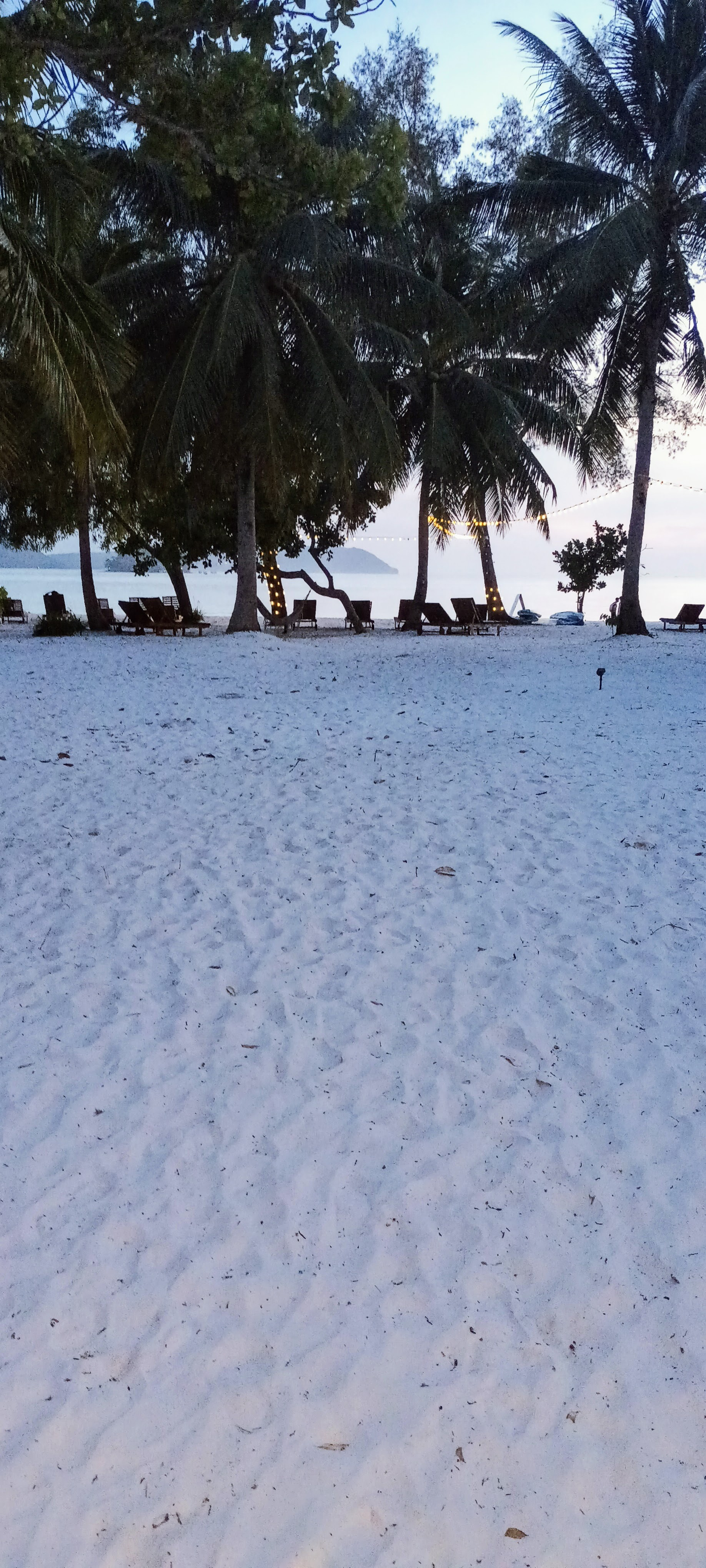
Long Set Beach, Koh Rong, Cambodia

Koh Rong is the biggest of the islands off the coast of Sihanoukville in the Gulf of Thailand. It stretches from south-east to north-west, is roughly elongate shaped and it encompasses an area of 78 km^{2} (30 sq mi). The terrain is predominantly hilly with a sizable mountain 316 m (1,037 ft) at the island's north-west. The hills provide water for countless creeks and estuaries. The island's interior is almost completely forested, concealing a number of seasonal waterfalls. Koh Rong has around 43 km (27 mi) of delicate beaches. There are no less than 23 beaches of varying length and coloration—from (predominantly) white to beige to rose-colored sands—along most of the coastline. Bays, protruding capes and impressive sandstone rock formations contribute to the island's scenic panorama. The southern coastline, exposed to the weather and open sea, is particularly spectacular, whereas the eastern coast, which faces towards the land, is characterized by a sequence of smooth hills, gently sloping towards the numerous crescent-shaped beaches, inlets and bays. Several small islets and many reefs provide an abundance of natural environments for a great variety of marine life. The center of the island is a flat "belt" of sediments that joins the two hilly massifs of the south-east and north-west. Here is a small savanna—the result of human activities and cultivation. Although most of the island's surface is still covered in forest.

Tiny Koh Touch island lies off the south-east and the twin islands of Koh Bong-Po'own or Koh Song-Saa lie off the north-east of Koh Rong. To its south lies the uninhabited island of Koh Koun, followed by Koh Rong Sanloem island. These five islands comprise the Sangkat Koh Rong or Commune 5 of Mittakpheap District.

== History ==
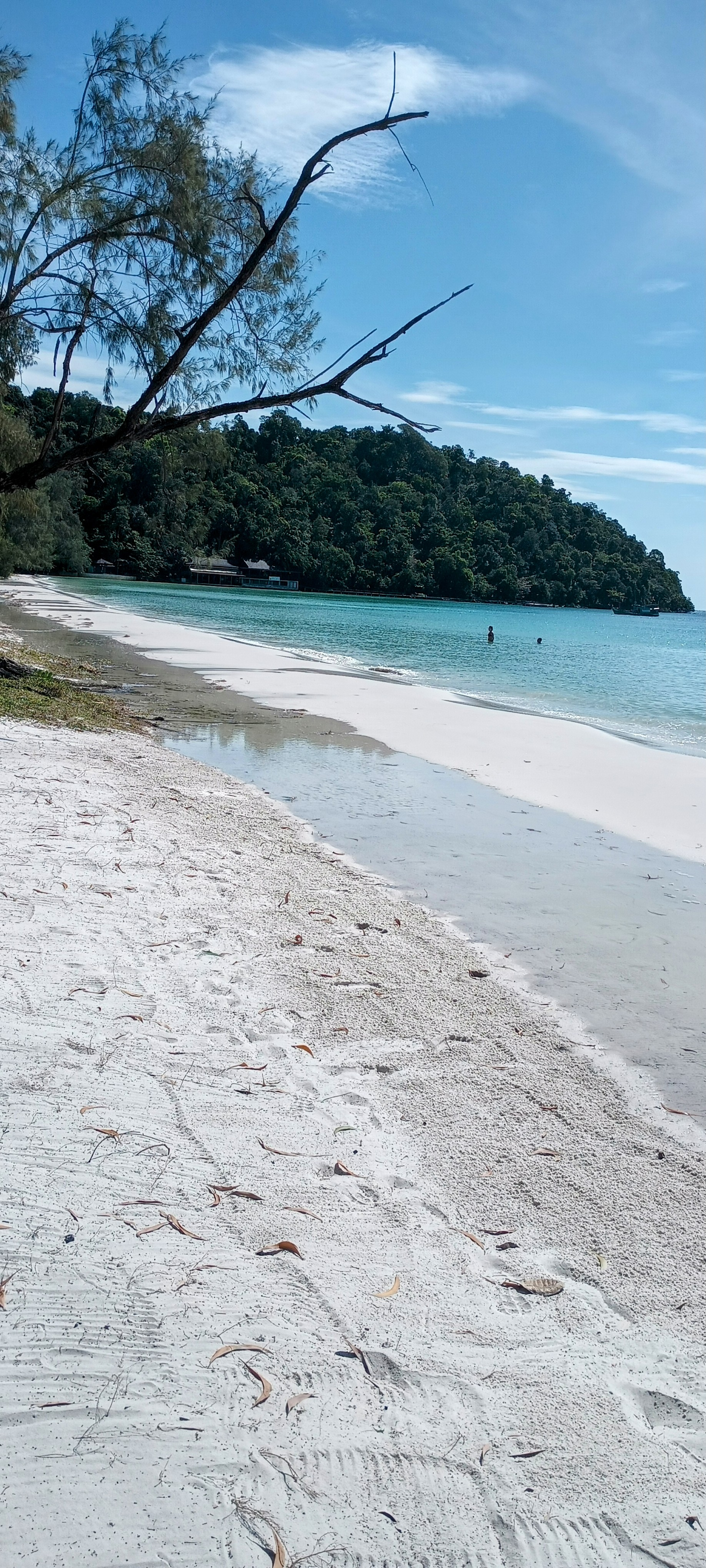
Long Set Beach, Koh Rong, Cambodia

The island was governed by the Navy authority for five miles around the island during 1979 to 2000. Since 2000 the Department of Fisheries is the principal government agency responsible for management of living aquatic resources. It cooperates with local authorities, communities, local fishers, and NGOs, to manage and conserve the resources.

Koh Rong island is a relatively new commune, only established in 2000. In order to boost development, Koh Rong has had a land concession issued by the Cambodian government. A Cambodian consortium, the Royal Group has been granted a 99-year lease. In 2008 it revealed plans to build "Asia's first environmentally planned resort island."

In February 2018, the Koh Rong Marine National Park was established around the island, Cambodia's first marine national park. In January 2019, a government sub-decree established a new city from Koh Rong and Koh Rong Sanloem.

Henri Mouhot on his way from Bangkok to Kampot, a day and a half before arrival, in Travels in the Central Parts of Indo-China, 1864:

I soon forgot the miseries of the first part of our voyage, and was amply recompensed by the shifting scenes of beauty presented to us by the group of islands we were passing.

== Transportation ==
=== Roads ===
In 2020, construction began on a 70-kilometre road network across Koh Rong as part of the island’s broader infrastructure and tourism development plan, with the project valued at approximately US$35 million.

=== Air ===
In 2013, proposed airport plans for Koh Rong highlighted the island’s growing strategic importance as an emerging international tourism destination The planned international airport is being developed by The Royal Group under a 99-year government concession as part of the island’s long-term tourism and infrastructure master plan.

=== Ferry ===
All transport to the island goes via sea routes. As of 2016, local residents and visitors can take advantage of a well-functioning ferry network. Daily high-speed ferry services connect Sihanoukville to Koh Rong, with operators including Island Speed Ferry, GTVC, Speed Ferry Cambodia, and Koh Rong Star Express offering daily crossings of approximately 30 to 45 minutes.

== Settlements and infrastructure ==
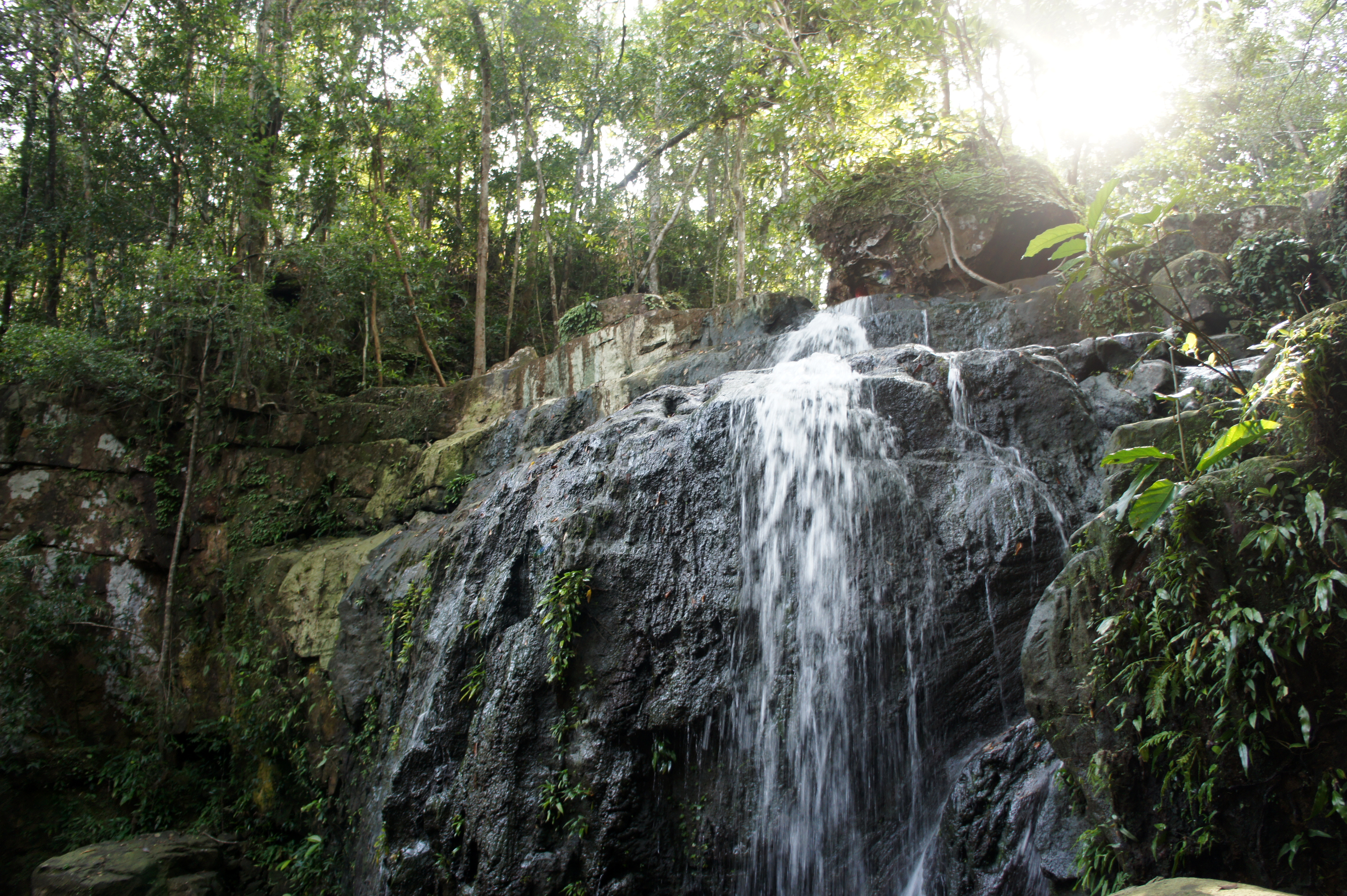
Waterfall near Sok San village

There are four distinguishable villages on Koh Rong—Koh Touch Village in the south-east, Prek Svay in the north-east, Daem Thkov (Sangkat Village) in the east, and Sok San Village in the west. Most local residents live from fishing (70%) and small scale crop cultivation (30%), although an increasing number has found jobs in the quickly growing tourism sector. This is particularly true for Koh Touch Village, where tourist businesses currently outnumber residential homes. The island's interior remains non-populated, villages and holiday resorts are confined to the coast and the beaches.

In September 2012, the island was hooked up with the internet to Sihanoukville on the main land. The Royal Group dropped a fiber-glass cable in the gulf's waters—a distance of almost 30 kilometers. Still, none of the infrastructural projects are yet under way and according to The Phnom Penh Post: "plans are foggy".

== Tourism ==
In 2010, developers on Koh Rong were warned by Cambodian authorities over environmental and development concerns as tourism and infrastructure projects on the island began to accelerate.

In 2026, Lethwei world champion Dave Leduc announced the construction of Kong MMA on Koh Rong, a multi-sport international training center. The President of the Kun Khmer Federation of Cambodia, HE Maj. Gen. Khov Chhay described the project as the largest and most modern MMA and Kun Khmer training facilities being developed in Cambodia, and as a future landmark for both martial arts and tourism.

== Survivor ==
The island has also played host to the popular reality program Survivor. In 2012, Koh-Lanta, the French edition of the program, produced a special All-Star edition (titled Koh-Lanta: Revenge of the Heroes) on Koh Rong, near Sok San village. Production returned to the island in 2013 for a regular edition (Koh-Lanta: Cambodia), but production ended abruptly after the death of a contestant from a heart attack. Koh-Lanta returned to the island in 2016 for another regular edition (Koh-Lanta: Island of Treasure).

More recently, the American edition of Survivor produced Season 31 (Survivor: Cambodia—Second Chance) and 32 (Survivor: Kaôh Rōng—Brains vs Brawn vs Beauty) of the program on Koh Rong over the course of four months between March and July 2015. The sixteenth edition of Expedition Robinson, Sweden's Survivor, was also filmed on Koh Rong.

== Gallery ==
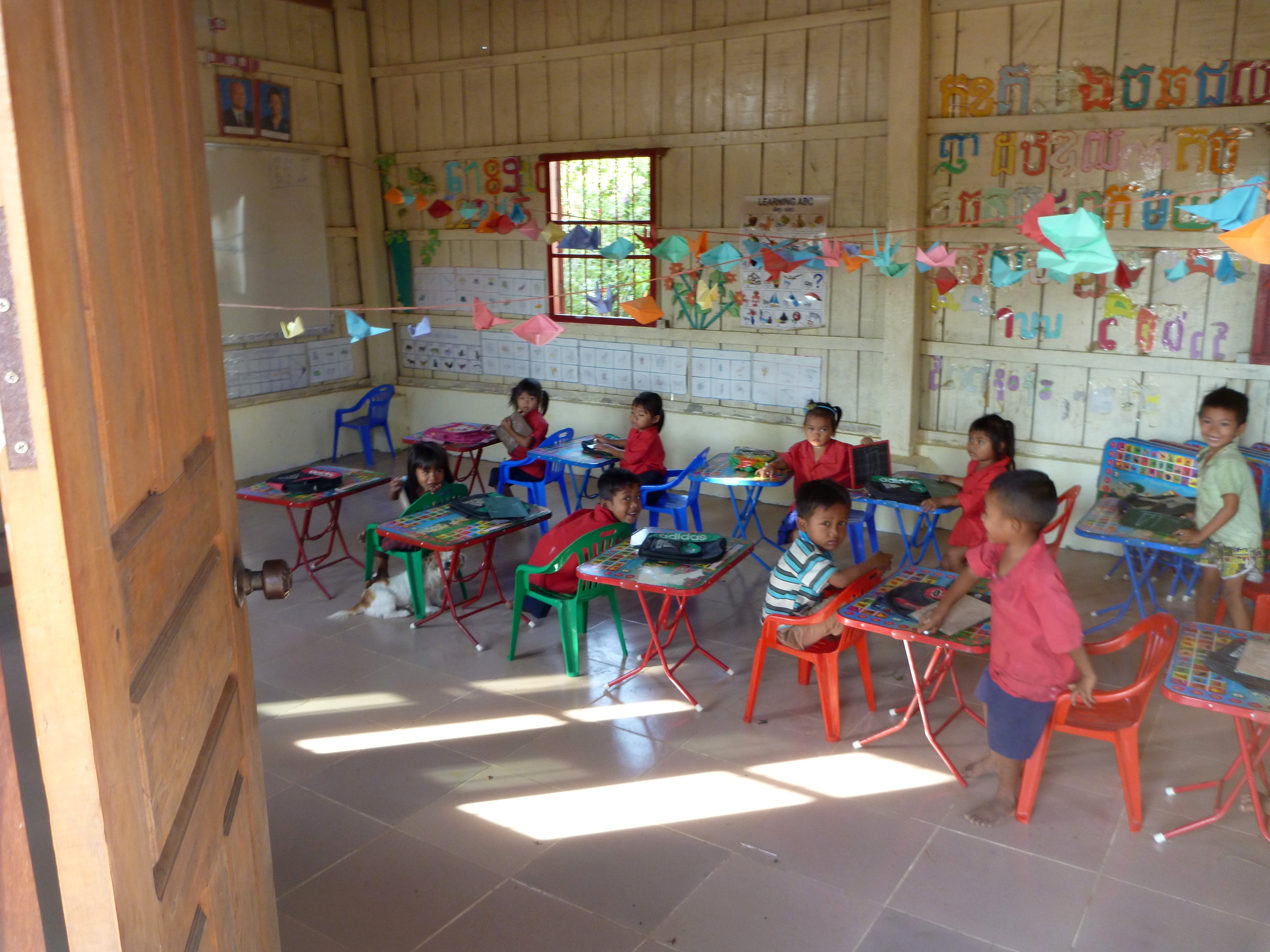
Rural elementary school

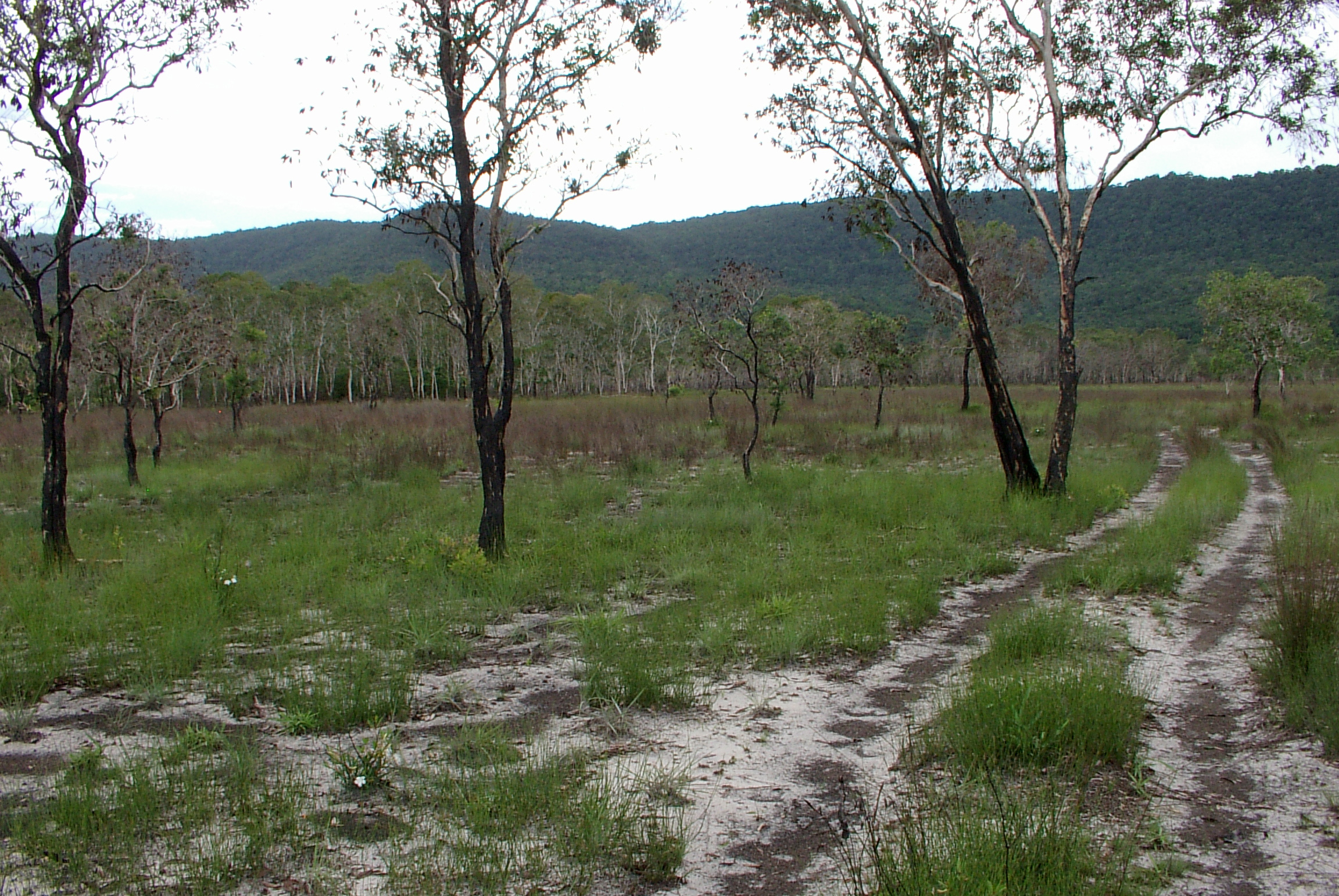
Koh Rong's central plains

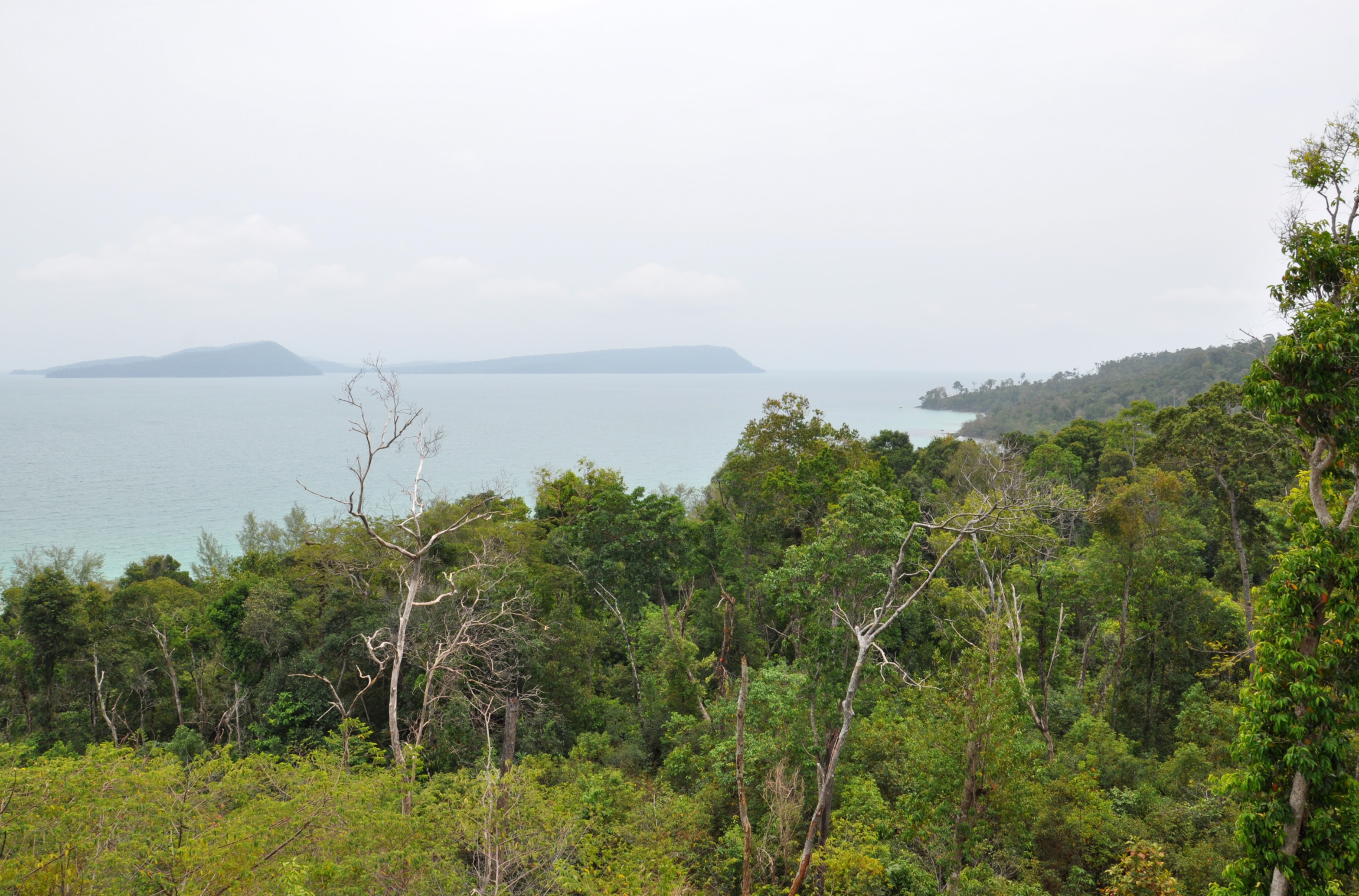
Koh Rong, viewing Koh Koun and Koh Rong Sanloem

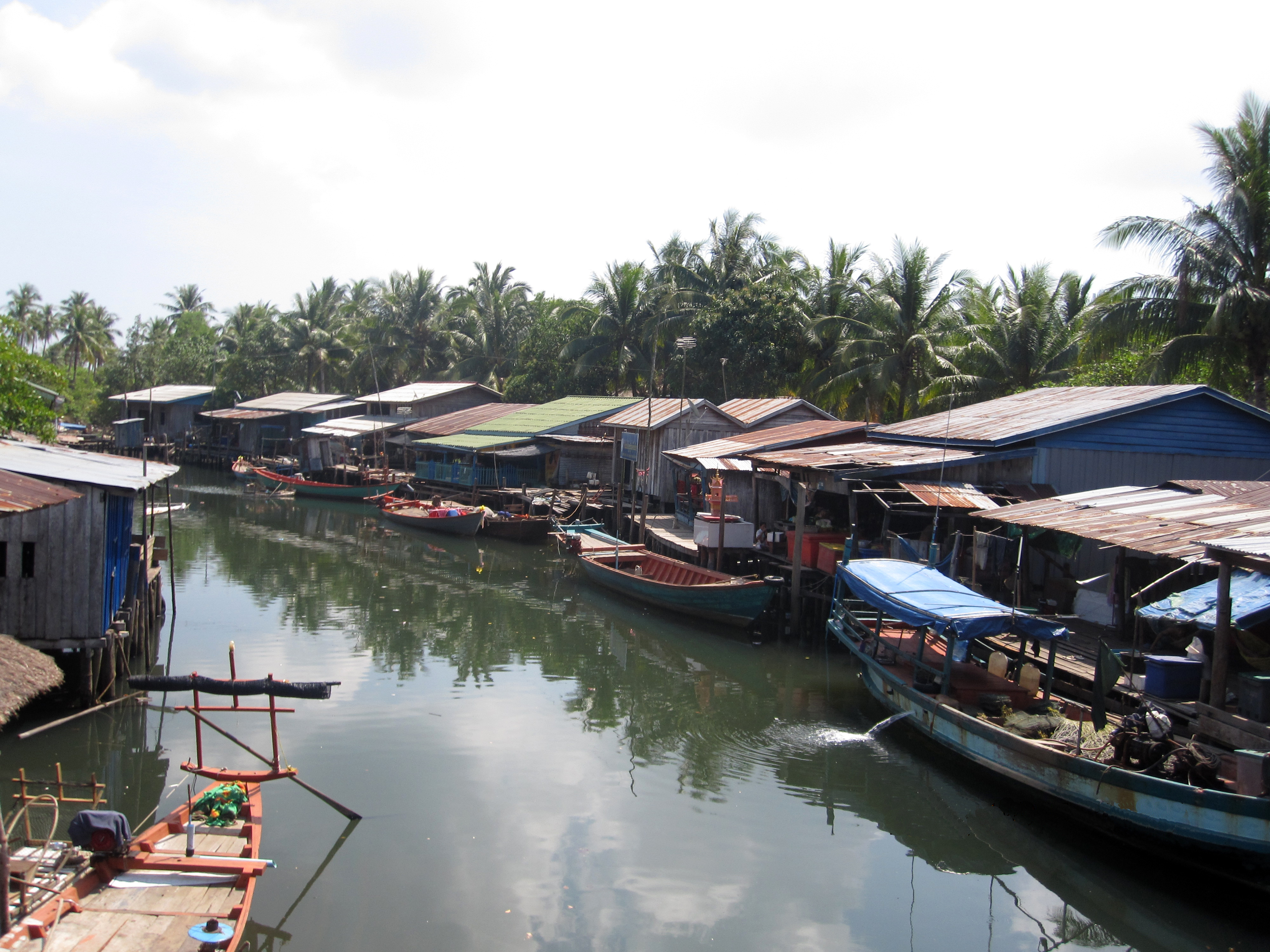
Prek Svay Village

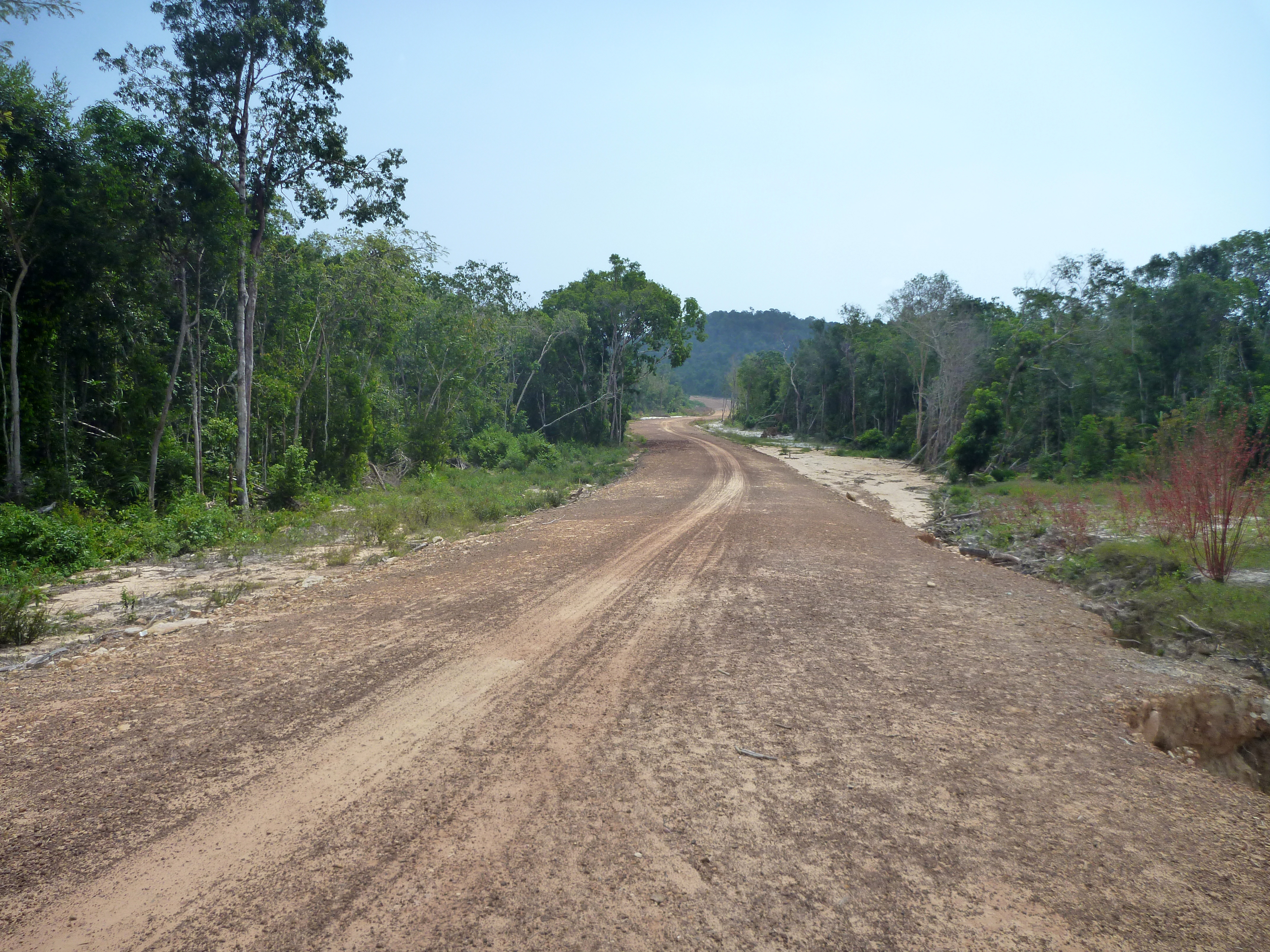
Road clearing, Koh Rong island

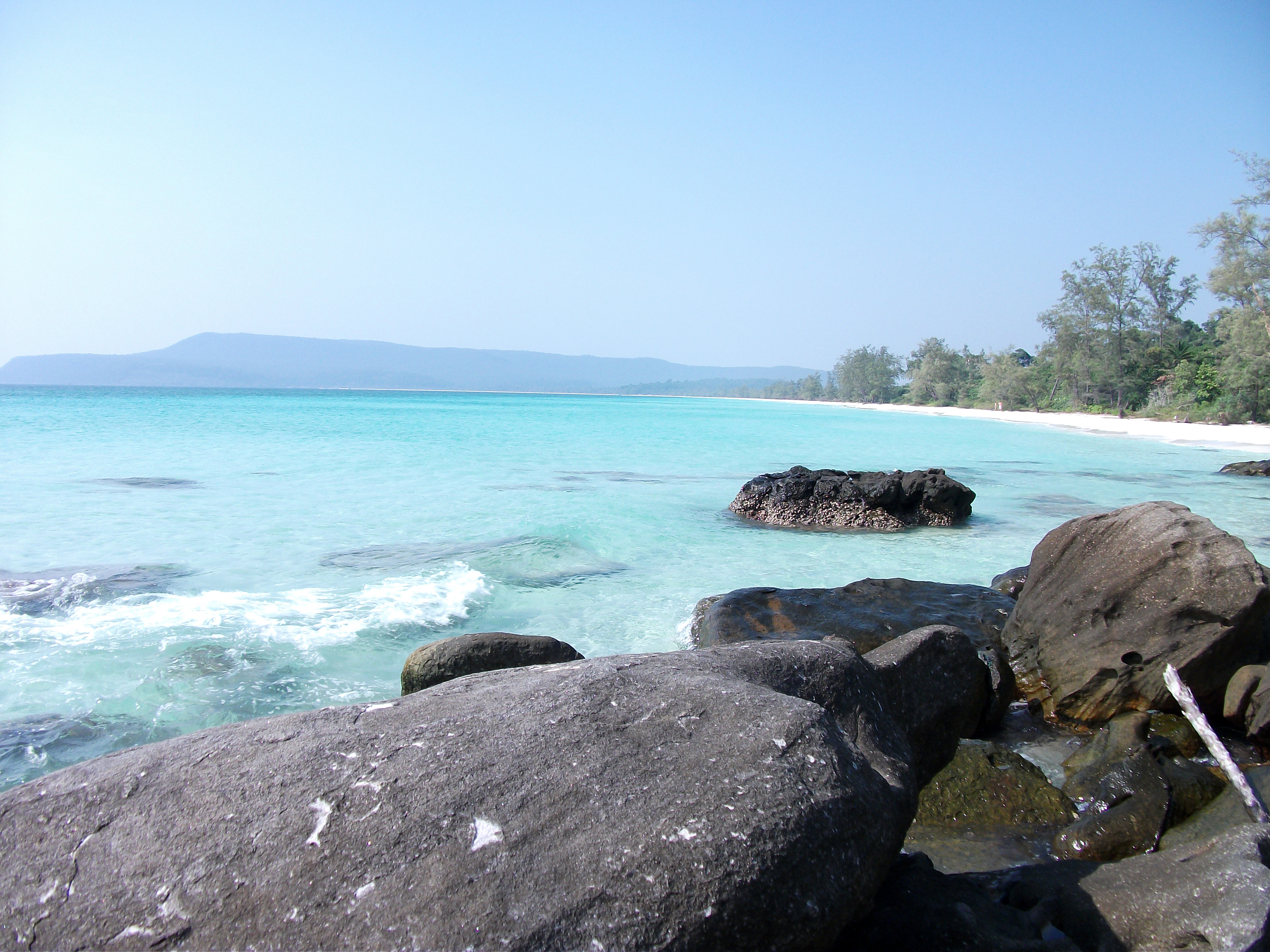
Sok San Beach Bay, Koh Rong

== See also ==
- Koh Rong Sanloem
- Koh Sdach
- Koh Thmei
- List of islands of Cambodia
- List of Cambodian inland islands
- Sihanoukville
