= List of Cambodian inland islands =

The following is a list of inland islands of Cambodia. All islands mentioned are either situated in the Tonle Sap Lake, the Tonle Sap River or the Mekong River. Most islands considerably vary in size over the course of a year, as a result of heavy rains during the rainy season and widespread inundation of the Mekong basin. Names are romanized according to the UNGEGN United Nations Group of Experts on Geographical Names system.

== Islands of Battambang Province ==
Name	English Name	Khmer Name	Size	Image
Kaôh Ché Nôk				
Kaôh Lngóng				
Kaôh Mŭs	Mosquito Island	កោះមូស		

== Islands of Kampong Chhnang Province ==
Name	English Name	Khmer Name	Size	Image
Kaôh Chab	Bird Island	កោះចាប		
Kaôh Don Âk				
Kaôh Kon	Child Island	កោះកូន		
Kaôh Krâbei	Buffalo island	កោះក្របី		
Kaôh Kêv				
Kaôh K’êk				
Kaôh O Tôtœ̆ng	Square Island	កោះទទឹង		
Kaôh Rœssei	Bamboo Island	កោះឫស្សី		
Kaôh Slêng	Hill/Mount Island			
Kaôh Stœ̆ng Tôtœ̆ng				
Kaôh Séh Slăb	Dead Horse Island	កោះសេះស្លាប់		
Kaôh Ta Mov				

== Islands of Kampong Cham Province ==
Name	English Name	Khmer Name	Size	Image
Kaôh Svay	Mango Island	កោះស្វាយ		
Kaôh Samraong		កោះសំរោង		

== Islands of Kandal Province ==
Name	English Name	Khmer Name	Size	Image
Kaôh Rumdĕng	Galanga Island			
Kaôh Thum	Big Island	កោះធំ		
Kaôh Ânlóng Chĕn		កោះអន្លង់ចិន		
Kaôh Ŏknha Tey	Lord Tey's island	កោះឧកញ៉ាតី		

== Islands of Kratie Province ==
Name	English Name	Khmer Name	Size	Image
Kaôh Bœ̆ng Khla				
Kaôh Bœ̆ng Kêv				
Kaôh Chan	Plate Island	កោះចាន		
Kaôh Chbar		កោះច្បារ		
Kaôh Chrés	Rust Island	កោះច្រេះ		
Kaôh Chrêng				
Kaôh Chrœ̆m				
Kaôh Dâmlong Thum	Big Potato Island	កោះដំឡូងធំ		
Kaôh Dâmlong Toch	Small Potato Island	កោះដំឡូងតូច		
Kaôh Khlêng Pôr				
Kaôh Khlăb				
Kaôh Khnhê				
Kaôh Krăng				
Kaôh Kâmbaôr				
Kaôh Kôr				
Kaôh Mul	Round Island	កោះមូល		
Kaôh Nôrŏng				
Kaôh Préang				
Kaôh Préng				
Kaôh Pêng	Lush Island			
Kaôh Réal				
Kaôh Rôngiĕv				
Kaôh Rœssei	Bamboo Island	កោះឬស្សី		
Kaôh Sbov	Elephant Grass Island	កោះស្បូវ		
Kaôh Sâm Thum				
Kaôh Sâm Toch				
Kaôh Sâmbôr		កោះសម្បូរ		
Kaôh Tahêm				
Kaôh Takôr				
Kaôh Tamau				
Kaôh Tasŭy				
Kaôh T'naôt	Sugar Palm Island	កោះស្ករត្នោត		
Kaôh Toănhán				
Kaôh Tróng	Ahead Island	កោះត្រង់មុន		
Kaôh Vêng	Long Island	កោះវែង		
Kaôh Âmpĭl	Tamarind Island	កោះអម្ពិល		
Kaôh Ândêng		កោះអណ្ដែង		
Kaôh Ĕnt Chey				

== Islands of Phnom Penh Province ==
Name	English Name	Khmer Name	Size	Image
Koh Pich	Diamond Island	កោះពេជ្រ		
Koh Romdual	Romdual Island	កោះរំដួល		

== Islands of Pursat Province ==
Name	English Name	Khmer Name	Size	Image
Kaôh Khleăng Koŭ				
Kaôh Khsăch Puŏy	Sand covered island			
Kaôh Lhêk				
Kaôh Rĭch				
Kaôh Sva Préam				
Kaôh Thmei	New Island	កោះថ្មី		

== Islands of Ratanakiri Province ==
Name	English Name	Khmer Name	Size	Image
Kaôh Horai				

== Islands of Stung Treng Province ==
Name	English Name	Khmer Name	Size	Image
Kaôh Băng Yâk				
Kaôh Chrœ̆m				
Kaôh Chvéa Mala				
Kaôh Han				
Kaôh Hib				
Kaôh Hvon Kêv				
Kaôh Kdei	Judge's Island			
Kaôh Khan Khăm				
Kaôh Khnhêng				
Kaôh Khon Hung				
Kaôh Ki				
Kaôh Kob				
Kaôh Kroch	Orange Island	កោះកក្រូច		
Kaôh Kák Phleut				
Kaôh Lai				
Kaôh Langa				
Kaôh Liĕng	Clean Island	កោះលាង		
Kaôh Mak Hvai				
Kaôh Nhang				
Kaôh Nu	That Island	កោះនោះ		
Kaôh O'Kêv				
Kaôh Phéta				
Kaôh Poŭri				
Kaôh Preăh	Holy Island	កោះព្រះ		
Kaôh Pring	Jambul Island	កោះព្រីង		
Kaôh Pu Ei				
Kaôh Pœăy				
Kaôh Snam Sai				
Kaôh Snêng	Love Island			
Kaôh Srâlay				
Kaôh Sâmpéay				
Kaôh Sŭn				
Kaôh Ta Ké	(Their) Ancestor's Island	កោះតា		
Kaôh Takak				
Kaôh Tbong Khla				
Kaôh Toŭm				

== See also ==
- Geography of Cambodia
- List of islands of Cambodia
- Koh Rong
