= Sihanoukville =

City in Preah Sihanouk province, Cambodia

Sihanoukville ក្រុងព្រះសីហនុ
- City
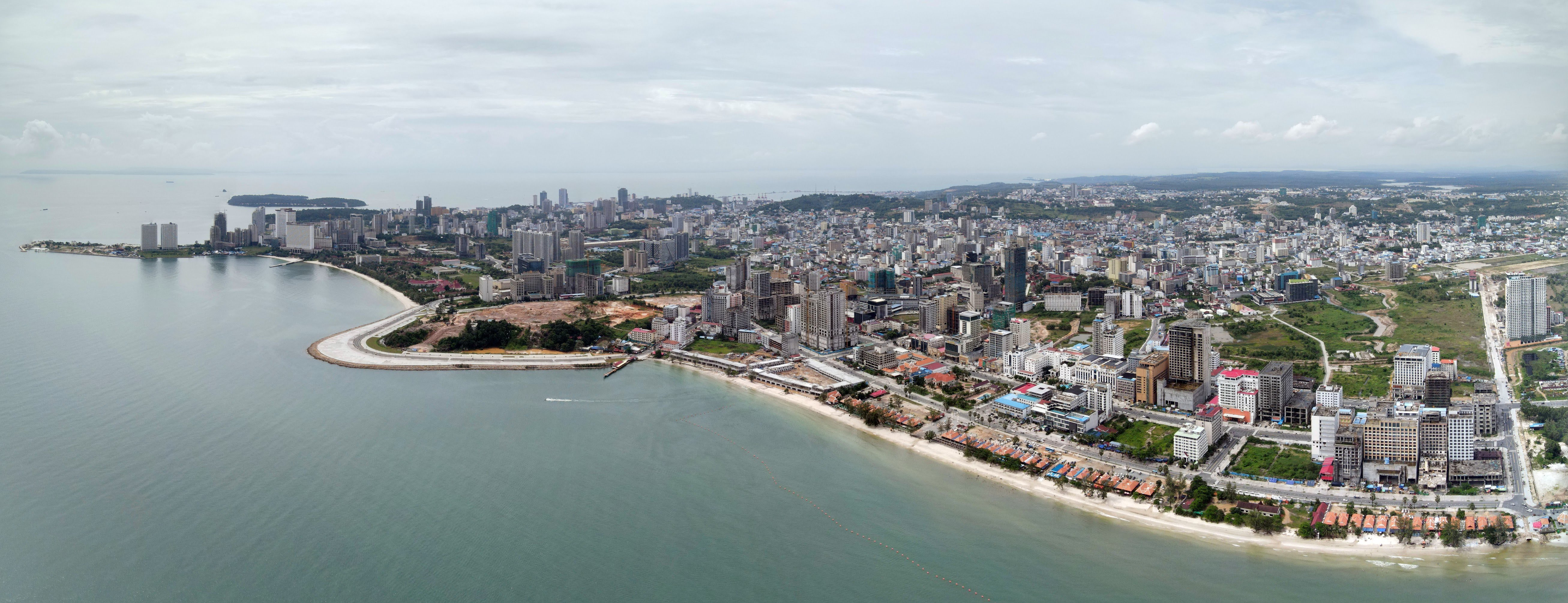
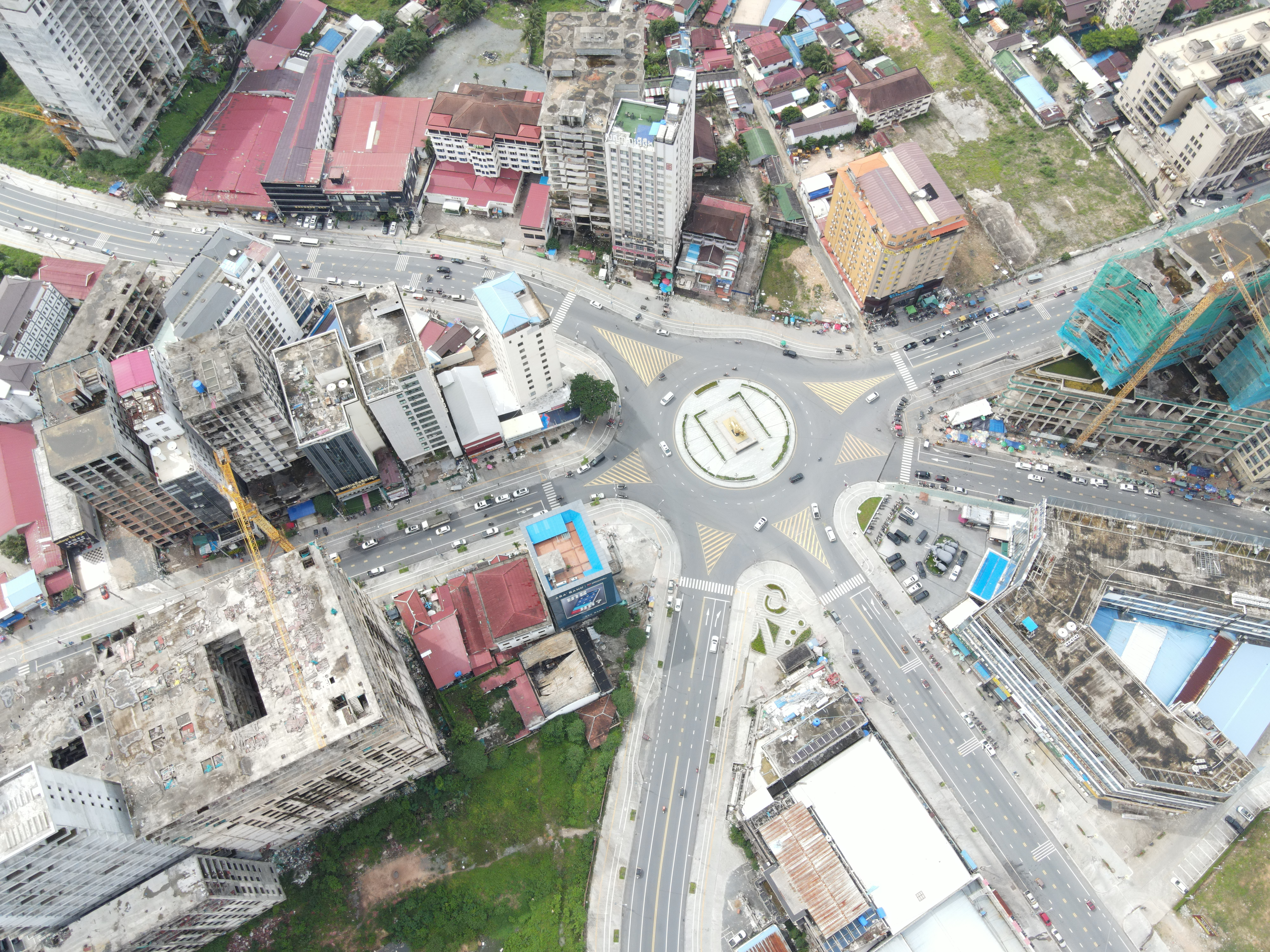
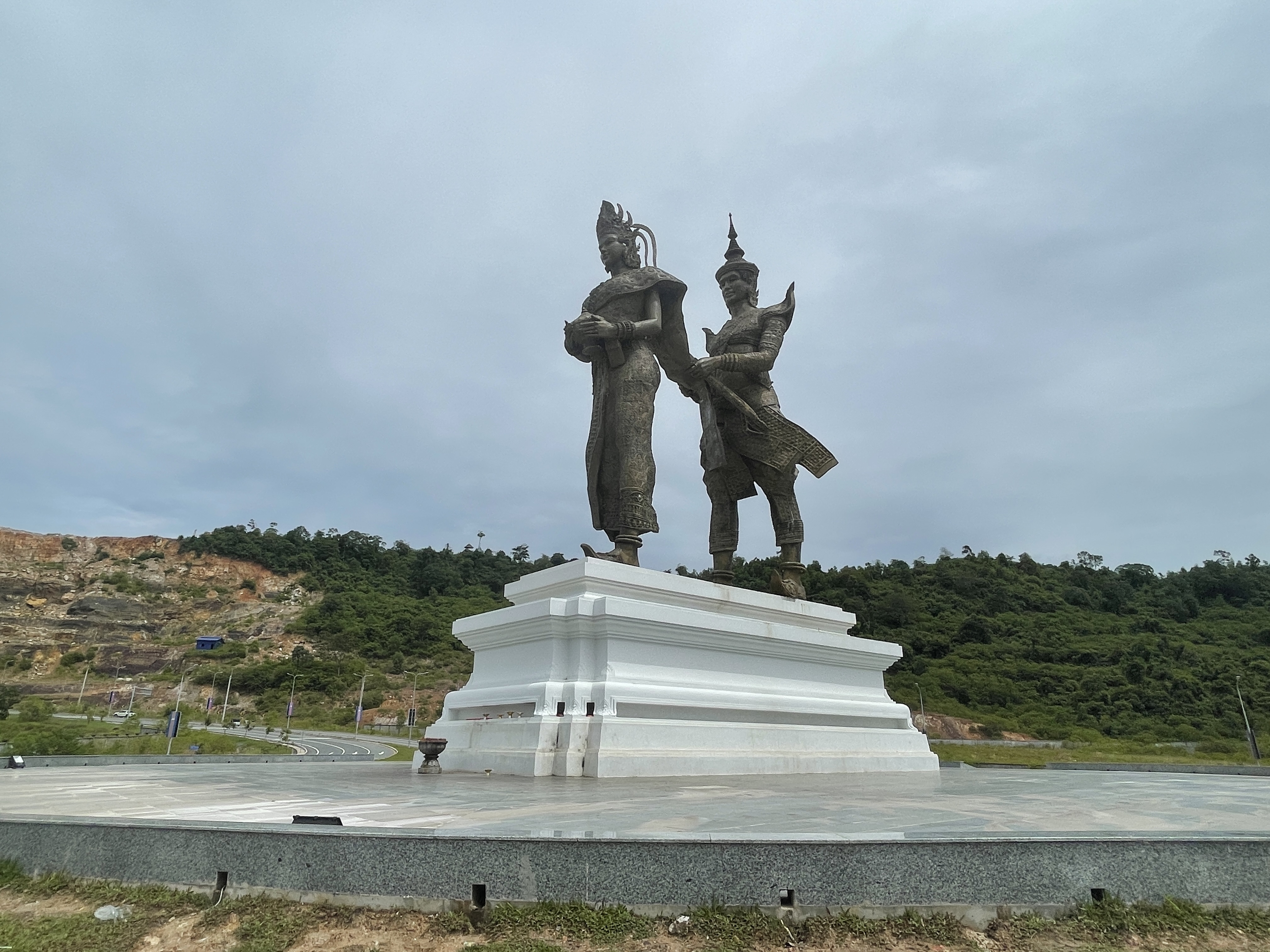
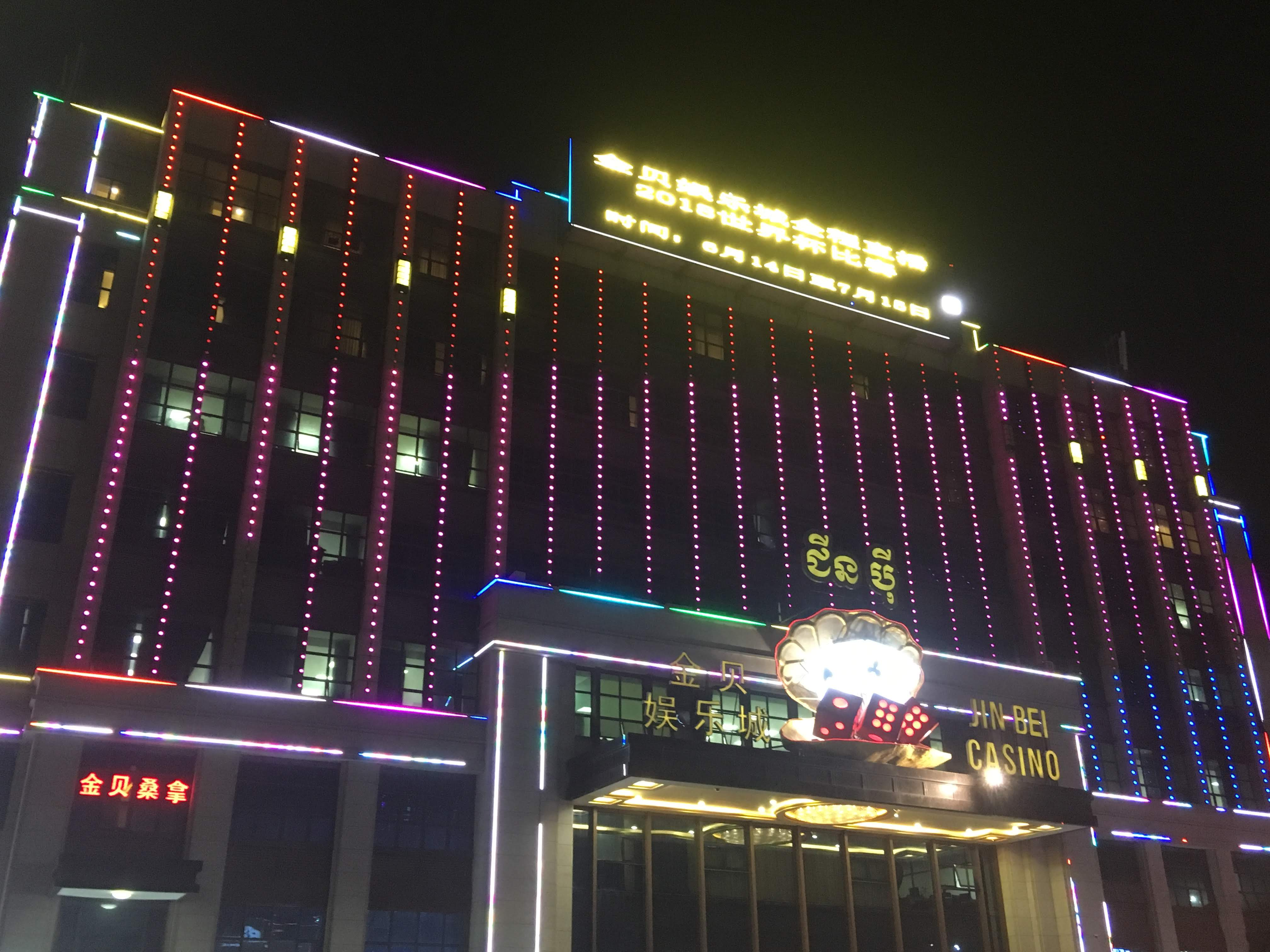
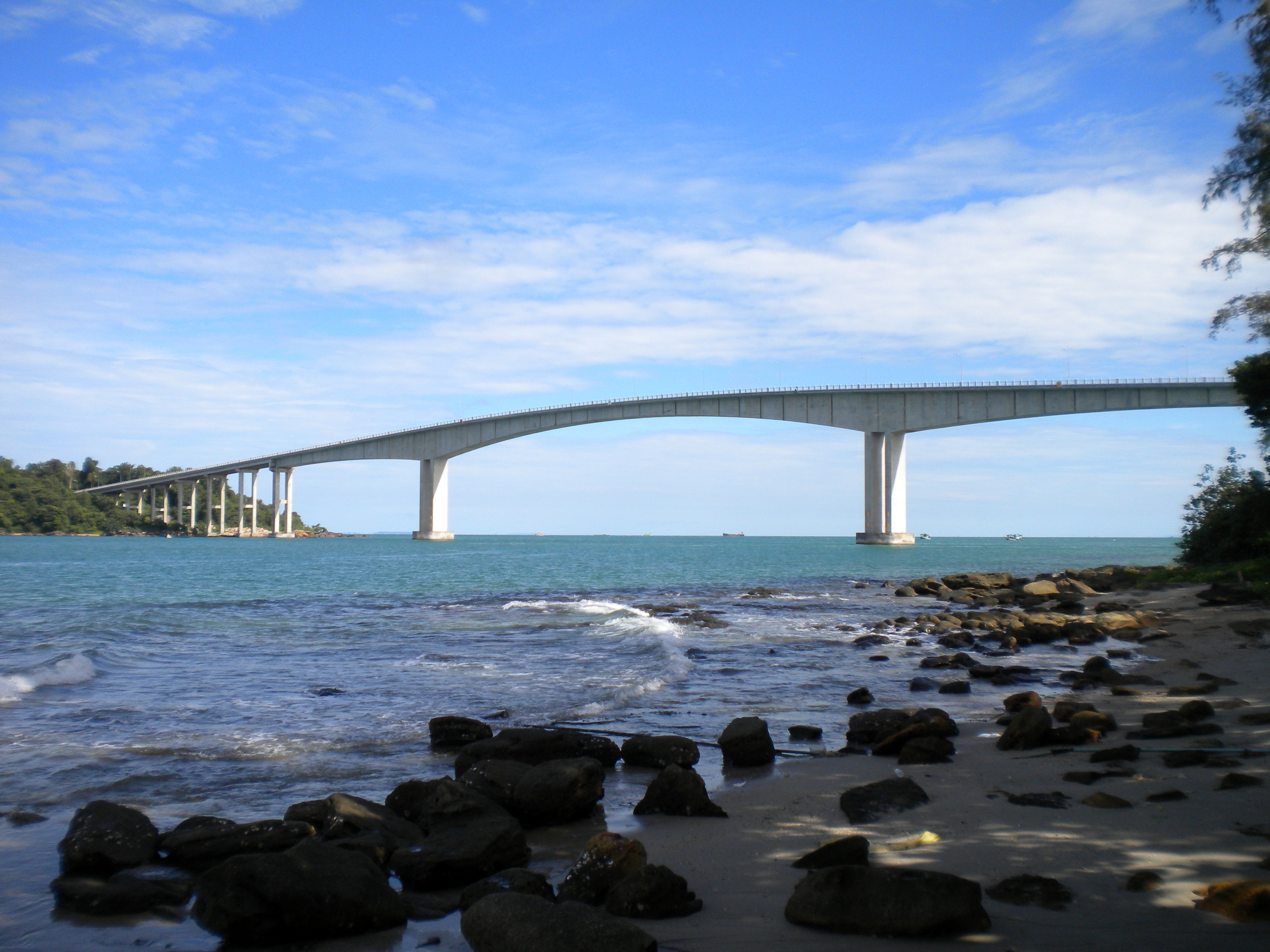
- Sihanoukville skyline Golden Lions Roundabout Statue of Preah Thong Neang Neak Jin Bei Casino Snake Island bridge

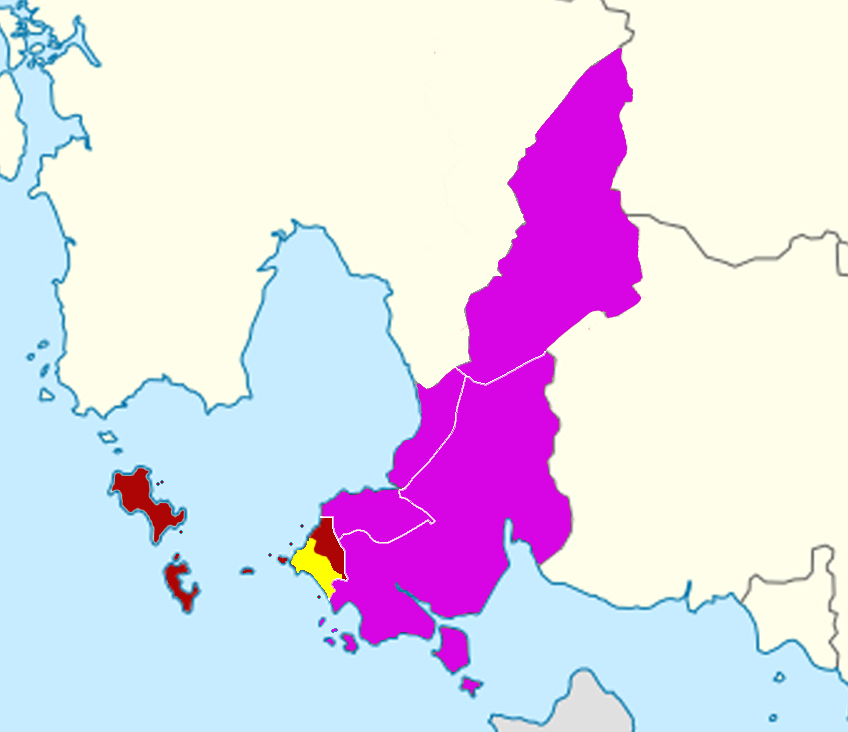
- Sihanoukville city's urban area (yellow) in Sihanoukville Municipality (red) and Sihanoukville Province (purple)

- Location in Cambodia
- Coordinates: 10°37′30″N 103°31′07″E
- Country: Cambodia
- Province: Preah Sihanouk
- Municipality: Preah Sihanouk
- Established: 22 November 1957
- Named for: Norodom Sihanouk

Government
  - Mayor: Sar Kackada (CPP)

Area
  - Total: 195.9 km^{2} (75.6 sq mi)
- Elevation: 15 m (49 ft)

Population (2019)
  - Total: ▼73,036
  - Rank: 7th
  - Urban: ▲66,723
  - Urban density: 834/km^{2} (2,160/sq mi)
  - Municipality: ▲89,846
- Time zone: UTC+7 (ICT)
- Postal code: 18000
- Area code: 034

Sihanoukville (Khmer: ក្រុងព្រះសីហនុ, romanized: Krŏng Preăh Seihănŭ [kroŋ prĕəh səjhanuʔ]), also known as Kampong Saom (កំពង់សោម, Kâmpóng Saôm [kɑmpɔŋ saom]) or Preah Sihanouk (ព្រះសីហនុ, Preăh Seihănŭ [prĕəh səjhanuʔ]), is a coastal port city in Cambodia and the capital of Preah Sihanouk Province, at the tip of an elevated peninsula in the country's south-west on the Gulf of Thailand. The city has a string of beaches along its coastline and coastal marshlands bordering Ream National Park in the east. It has one navigable river, the mangrove-lined Ou Trojak Jet, running from Otres Pagoda to the sea at Otres. Several sparsely inhabited islands under Sihanoukville's administration are near the city.

The city was named in honor of the former king Norodom Sihanouk and as of 2008 had a population of around 89,800 and approximately 66,700 in its urban center. It encompasses the greater part of six communes (Sangkats) in Sihanoukville Province. It has evolved parallel to the construction of the Sihanoukville Autonomous Port, which commenced in 1955, as the country's gateway to direct and unrestricted international sea trade. Cambodia's only deep-water port, it includes an oil terminal and a transport logistics facility. The city has grown into Cambodia's main centre for coastal tourism and gambling, but it has also gained notoriety as a base for organized crime, including human trafficking, scams (particularly jobs, romance and pig butchering scams), among other illicit activities.

== Etymology ==
The official name of the city in Khmer is: krong ('city'), preah ('holy') Sihanouk (name of the former king), which adds up to: "City of the Holy Sihanouk" or "Honorable Sihanouk City". King Norodom Sihanouk (reigned 1941–1955, 1993–2004) is revered as the father of the (modern) nation. The name Sihanouk is derived from Sanskrit through two Pali words: siha ('lion'), and hanu ('jaws').

The alternative name, Kompong Saom (also romanized as Kompong Som and Kampong Som), (Khmer: កំពង់សោម) means 'Port of the Moon' or 'Shiva's Port'. Saom is derived from the Sanskrit word saumya, the original (Rig Vedic) meaning of which was Soma, the 'juice or sacrifice of the moon-god', but evolved into Pali 'moon', 'moonlike' 'name of Shiva'. The word kampong or kompong is of Malay origin and means 'village' or 'hamlet'. Its meaning underwent extension towards 'pier' or river 'landing bridge'.

== History ==
=== Classical period (before 1700) ===
Before the foundation works of the port and city of 1955, the port of Kompong Som must have been only of regional significance due to the lack of navigable waterways connecting it with the kingdom's settlement centers. During the many centuries of pre-Angkorian and Angkorian history, from Funan to Chenla and during the Khmer Empire, regional trade was centered at O Keo (Vietnamese: Óc Eo) in the Mekong Delta, now the Vietnamese province of Rạch Giá. The township of Prei Nokor (Saigon) was a commercial center of the Khmer Empire.

The Chronicle of Samtec Cauva Vamn Juon, one of the 18th- and 19th-century Cambodian Royal Chronicles, briefly mentions the region as the country was split into three parts during a civil war from 1476 to 1485: "In 1479, Dhammaraja took on the throne at Chatomuk (Phnom Penh) and controlled the provinces of Samraong Tong, Thbong, Kompong Saom, Kampot up to the Bassak, Preah Trapeang, Kramuon Sah, Koh Slaket and Peam" (mouth of the Mekong).

=== Early modern period (c. 1700–1863) ===
At the end of the 17th century, Cambodia lost control of the Mekong River route as Vietnamese power expanded into the lower Mekong. During the Nguyen-Siamese War (1717–1718) a Siamese fleet burned the port of Kompong Som in 1717 but was defeated by the Vietnamese at Banteay Meas/Ha Tien. A Cambodian king of the late 18th century, Outey-Reachea III, allied with a Chinese pirate, Mac-Thien-Tu, who had established an autonomous polity based in Ha Tien and controlled the maritime network in the eastern part of the Gulf of Thailand. Ha Tien was at a point where a river linking to the Bassac River flows into the Gulf of Thailand. Landlocked Cambodia tried to keep its access to maritime trade through Ha Tien. In 1757, Ha Tien acquired the ports of Kampot and Kompong Som as a reward for Mac's military support to the king of Cambodia. Until its destruction in 1771 the port developed into an independent duty-free entrepôt linked with several Chinese trading networks.

Alexander Hamilton, who traveled to the Gulf of Thailand in 1720, wrote, "Kompong Som and Banteay Meas (later Ha Tien) belonged to Cambodia, as Cochin-China was divided from Cambodia by a river (Bassac River) of three leagues broad" and "King Ang Duong constructed a road from his capital of Oudong to Kampot". Kampot remained Cambodia's only international seaport. "The traveling time between Udong and Kampot was eight days by oxcart and four days by elephants." French Résident Adhemard Leclère wrote: "Until 1840s, the Vietnamese governed Kampot and Péam [Mekong Delta], but Kompong Som belonged to Cambodia. The Vietnamese constructed a road from Ha Tien to Svai village, on the border with Kompong-Som, via Kampot."

The British Empire followed a distinct policy by the 1850s, seeking to consolidate its influence. Foreign Secretary Lord Palmerston's agent John Crawfurd reported: "Cambodia was...the Keystone of our policy in these countries, - the King of that ancient Kingdom is ready to throw himself under the protection of any European nation...The Vietnamese were interfering with the trade at Kampot, and this would be the basis of an approach". Palmerston concluded: "The trade at Kampot—one of the few remaining ports, could never be considerable, in consequence of the main entrance to the country, the Mekong, with all its feeders flowing into the Sea through the territory of Cochin China . The country, too, had been devastated by recent Siam–Vietnam wars. Thus, without the aid of Great Britain, Kampot or any other port in Cambodia, can never become a commercial Emporium." Crawfurd later wrote: "The Cambodians...sought to use intervals of peace in the Siam–Vietnam wars to develop intercourse with outside nations. The trade at Kampot which they sought to foster was imperiled by pirates. Here is a point where the wedge might be inserted, that would open the interior of the Indo-Chinese Peninsula to British Commerce, as the great River of the Cambodians traverses its entire length and even affords communication into the heart of Siam".

=== French rule (1863–1954) ===
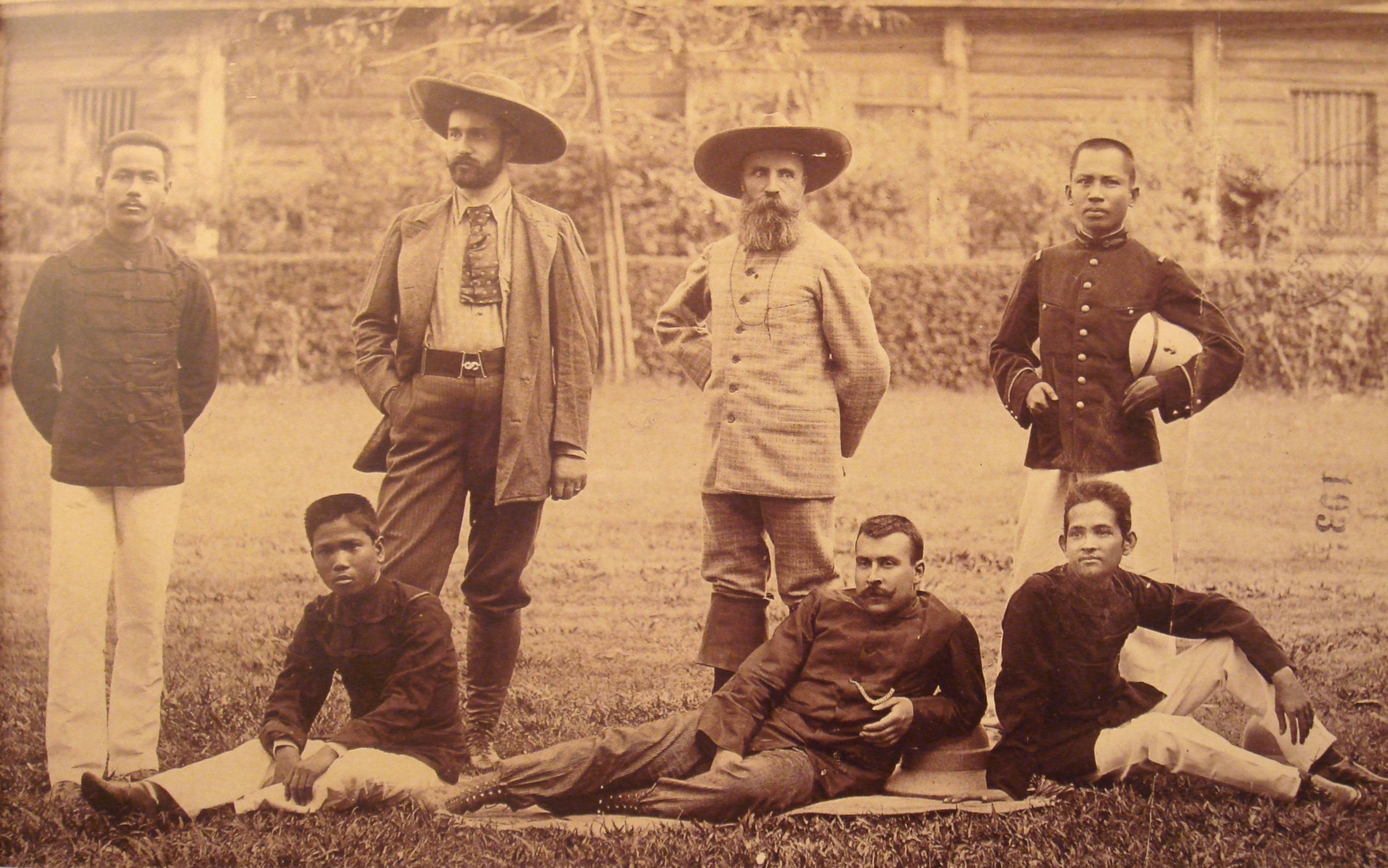
French civil servant Auguste Pavie (centre) and Pierre Lefèvre-Pontalis in 1893 with Cambodian interpreters

Under French rule, Vietnam, Laos, and Cambodia became a single administrative and economic unit. The coastal region Circonscription Résidentielle, with Kampot as its capital, contained the arrondissements of Kampot, Kompong Som, Trang, and Kong-Pisey. The establishment of another international trading center near Saigon was considered unnecessary. Focus remained the Mekong and establishing an alternate route to Chinese and Thai markets along an uninterrupted navigable waterway to the Mekong Delta.

==== Insurrection ====
An insurrection that took place from 1885 to 1887 further discouraged French ambition. It started in Kampot and quickly spread to Veal Rinh, Kampong Seila, and Kompong Som, where the insurgents were led by a Chinese pirate named Quan-Khiem. He managed to control the northern part of Preah Sihanouk for some time until he—an old man—was arrested by the local governor.

One example of this period's infrastructural improvements is the construction of Route Coloniale No. 17, later renamed National Road No. 3, and the national railway system, although work on the "Southern Line", from Phnom Penh to Sihanoukville, only began in 1960.

=== After independence (since 1954) ===
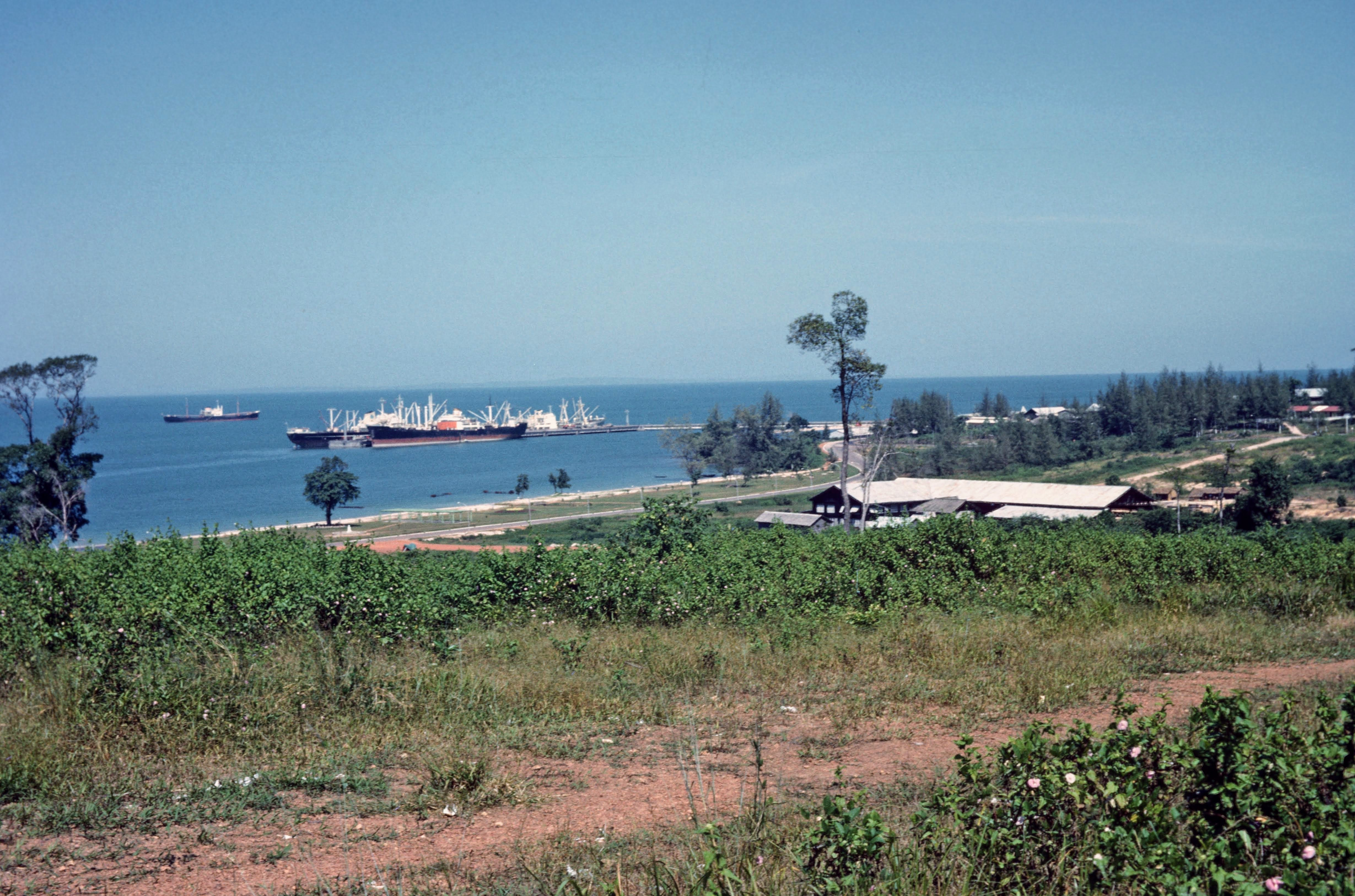
Sihanoukville in 1964.

The city's and province's alternative name, Kampong som (Kampong Som), was adopted from the local indigenous community. After the dissolution of French Indochina in 1954, Vietnam's steadily tightening control of the Mekong Delta required a solution to gain unrestricted access to the seas. Plans were made to construct an entirely new deep-water port. Kompong Saom (Kampong Som) was selected for its water depth and ease of access. In August 1955, a French/Cambodian construction team cut a base camp into the unoccupied jungle in the area now known as Hawaii Beach. Funds for construction of the port came from France and the road was financed by the United States.

During the Vietnam War the port became a military facility for both sides: in the service of National Front for the Liberation of South Vietnam, and, after 1970, under the government of Lon Nol, in the service of the United States.

The port was the last place the U.S. Army evacuated, only days before Khmer Rouge guerrillas took control of the government in April 1975. The events surrounding the Khmer Rouge's taking of the U.S. container ship SS Mayaguez and its crew on 12 May and the subsequent rescue operation by U.S. Marines played out on the waters of Koh Tang off the coast of Sihanoukville. During the two days of action, the U.S. commenced air strikes on targets on the mainland of Sihanoukville, including the port, the Ream Naval Base, an airfield, the railroad yard, and the petroleum refinery, in addition to strikes and naval gunfire on several islands. After the fall of the Khmer Rouge regime in 1979 and the subsequent opening of the economy, the port of Sihanoukville resumed its importance in the country's development and recovery. With the further opening of new markets in 1999, the city regained its role in Cambodia's economic growth.

In 1993, Ream National Park was established per royal decree of former King Sihanouk. The Sihanoukville Municipality was elevated to a regular province on 22 December 2008 after King Norodom Sihamoni signed a royal decree converting the municipalities of Kep, Pailin, and Sihanoukville into provinces. In the early 21st century, Sihanoukville became a center of trade, commerce, transport, and process manufacturing. Sihanoukville's many beaches and nearby islands make it Cambodia's premier seaside resort.

In 2006, the Koh Puos (Cambodia) Investment Group submitted an application, planning to invest US$276 million in converting the 116-hectare Koh Puos, Snake Island, into a luxury residential and resort complex. After the completion of certain elements of the infrastructure, the investor announced alterations of the original blueprints, as "Reapplying for permission will happen in 2014", according to the Council of the Development of Cambodia.

On 26 May 2011, the Preah Sihanouk area joined the Paris-based club Les Plus Belles Baies Du Monde ('the most beautiful bays in the world'). The organization accepted the Bay of Cambodia as a member at its 7th General Assembly.

By 2019, Chinese investment had transformed the city, so that more than 90% of businesses were owned by Chinese nationals. Over 100 casinos were planned to be built in Sihanoukville in an effort to transform it into a gambling hub, which coincided with an increase in crime. In the 2020s, Sihanoukville emerged as a major hub for online scam operations associated with Chinese criminal gangs in which victims, who were Southeast Asian, Chinese, and Taiwanese nationals, were held forcefully in call centers, and were forced to conduct the scam operations or risk facing torture. In February 2024, Taiwanese YouTuber Goodnight Chicken, inspired by the scams, claimed he broke into a scam compound and faked his own kidnapping on a live stream. He was later arrested for "incitement to cause chaos to social security", and sentenced to two years in prison.

== Geography ==
=== Topography ===
Sihanoukville town is at the tip of the rolling hills of a peninsula on the Gulf of Thailand. To its northwest and at its center it rises up to 15 metres (49 ft) above sea level, whereas the land gently and steadily flattens towards extended coastal plains, marshlands and beaches in the south and southeast. The Gulf of Thailand's shallow depths and the local climate are moderate in contrast to the South China Sea to the east and the Indian Ocean to the west.

=== Architecture and cityscape ===
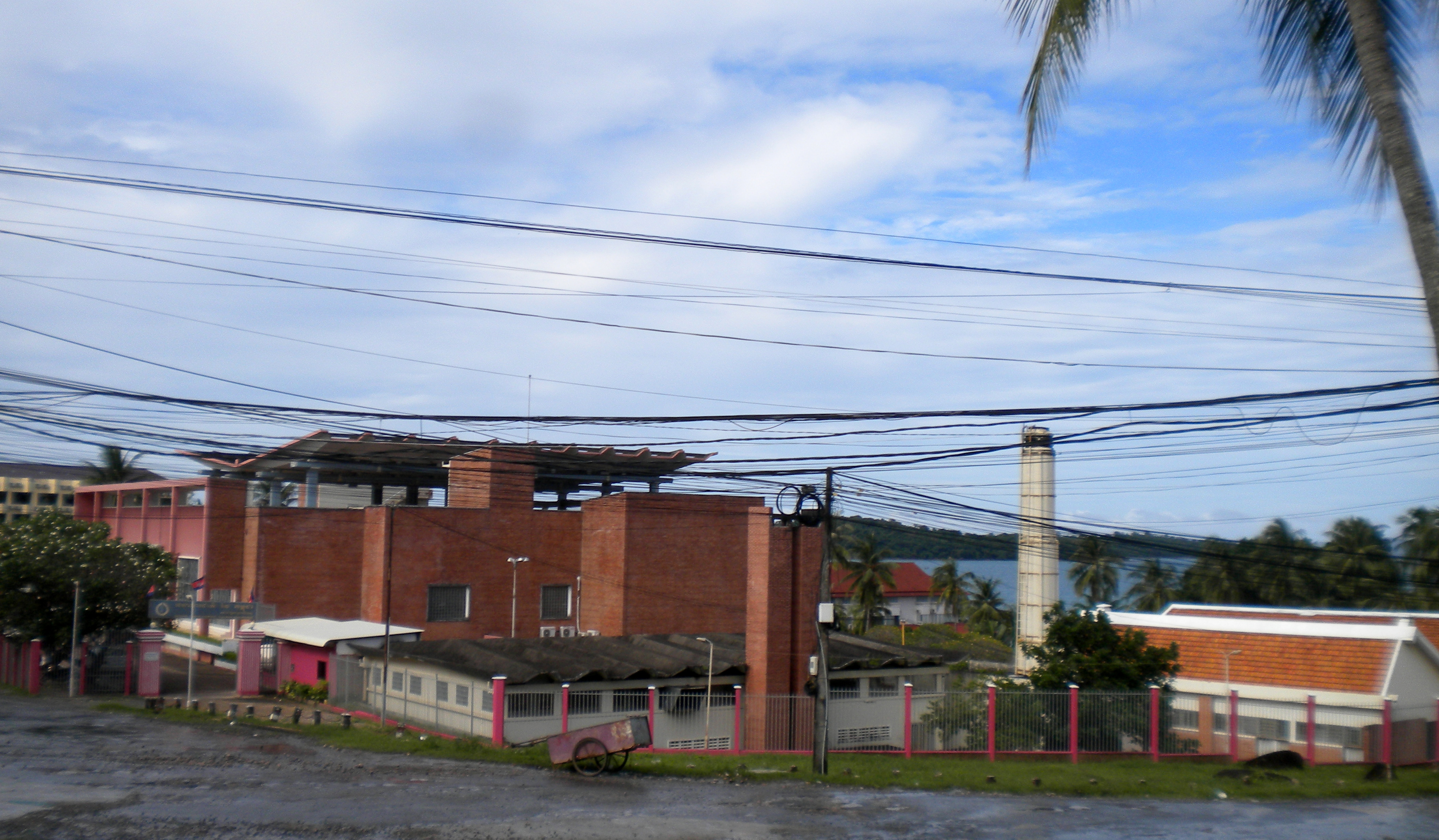
National Bank of Cambodia, example of New Khmer Architecture designed by Vann Molyvann

Established after the period of the French Protectorate, bourgeois colonial style quarters such as ones seen in Kampot, Siem Reap, or Phnom Penh do not exist. Cambodian architect Vann Molyvann designed objects, and public buildings with a distinct function, some still operational. This brief era of New Khmer Architecture ended in 1970.

In 1959, the first urban plan for the city was completed for a population of 55,000 residents; it included cycle paths and green spaces. The plan also marked out the zoning for the port, the railway network, the town center with municipal offices, business and residential housing, and a tourist zone to the south along the beaches. A feasibility study by the United States Operations Mission (USOM) looked at drawing on a new water supply from the Prek Tuk Sap and existing lagoons; these were subsequently cut off from the sea and used as the initial source for town supply. The reservoirs are still operational but insufficient for today's demands. The area connects with the city center along a single highway via typical irregular successions of residential buildings.

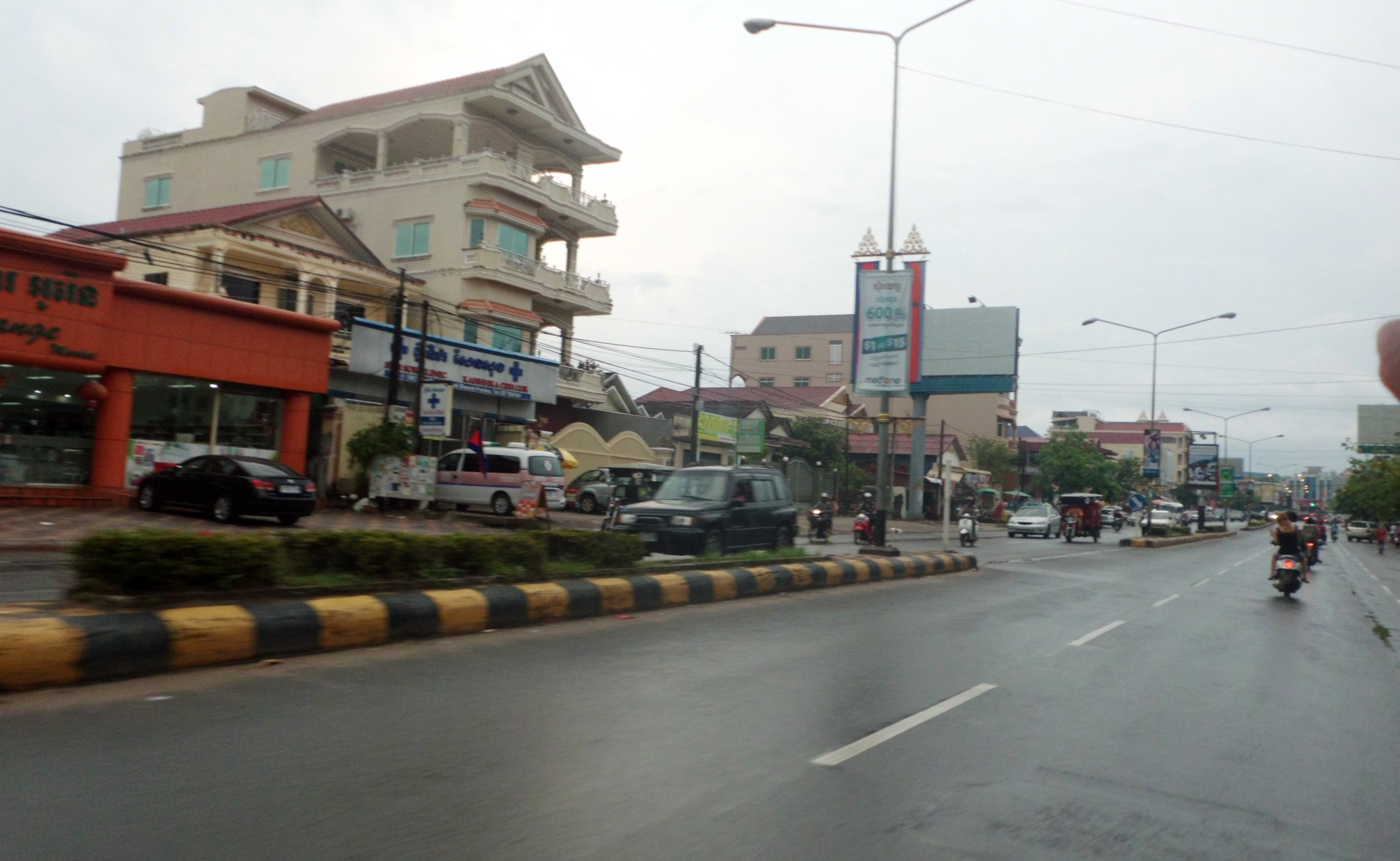
Ekreach Road, Sihanoukville's main thoroughfare

=== Rivers ===
The mangrove-lined Ou Trojak Jet River, which runs from Otres Pagoda to Otres Beach, is Sihanoukville's longest river. In the tidal mangrove area Barramundi, mangrove jacks and barracuda are the prize targets for sport anglers; the lower section harbors a marina. Restaurants along the south bank of the river serve fresh seafood supplied by the local inshore fishing boats. Due to their proximity to the sea, mangroves line large parts of the rivers.

=== Islands ===
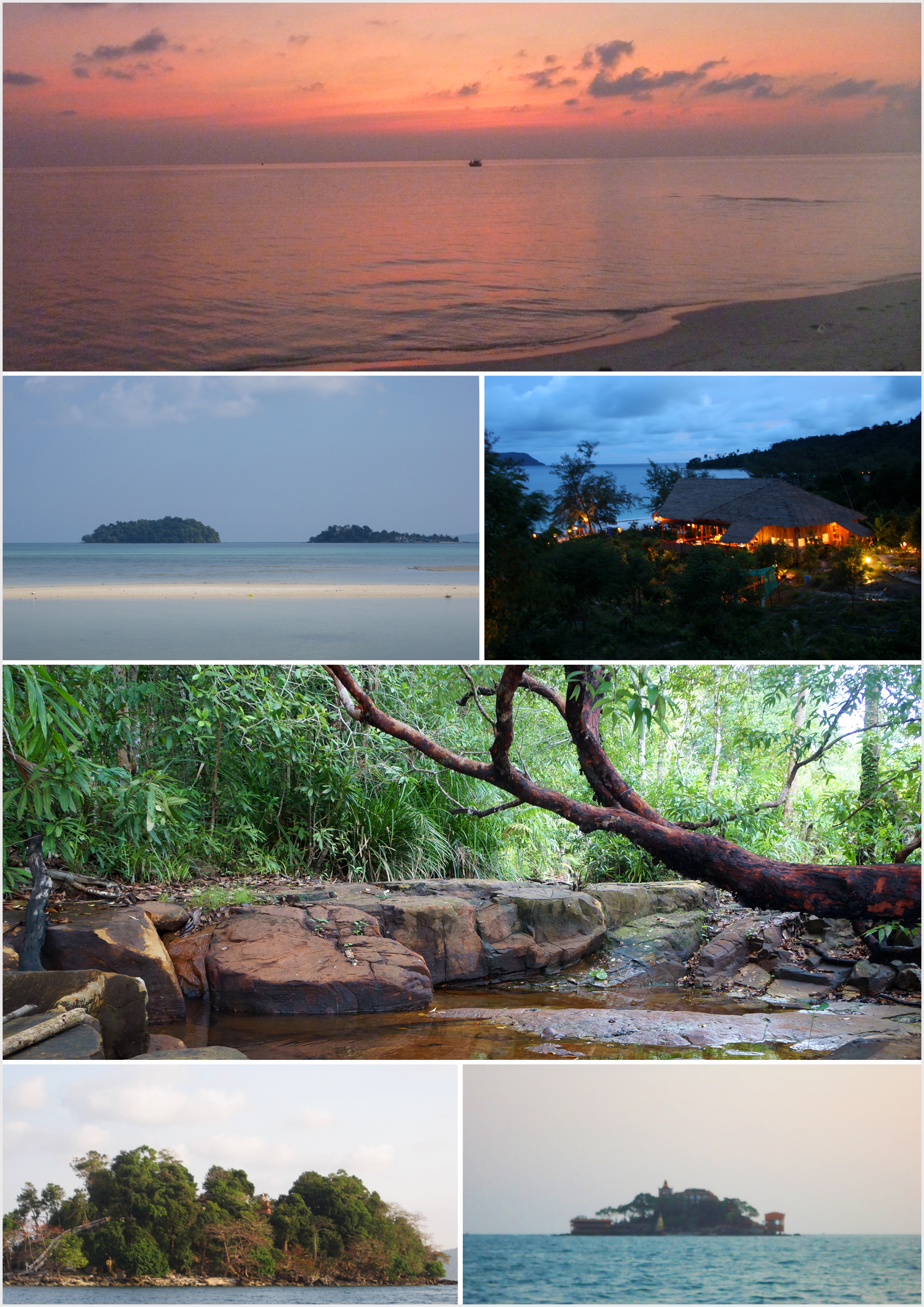
Top: remote beach on Koh Rong center top left: Koh Bong Po'on center top right: Koh Rong Resort center bottom: Koh Rong Sanloem bottom left: Koh Tuich bottom right: Koh Dek Koul

All the islands listed below fall under the administration of Sihanoukville's Mittakpheap District. The majority is either in the process of or has been assigned for extensive tourism. Koh Rong and Koh Rong Sanloem in particular have so far undergone years of uncoordinated development. Koh Rong has been declared a stop on the Banana Pancake Trail.

- Koh Rong, កោះរ៉ុង: Koh Rong, 26 km (16 mi) west of Sihanoukville, is the biggest island in Sihanoukville Province, with an area of 78 km^{2} (30 sq mi). The terrain is predominantly hilly, with a 316 metres (1,037 ft) mountain at the island's northwest. The island's interior is almost completely forested. As of 2016, there is a ferry network between Sihanoukville and Koh Rong.
- Koh Rong Sanloem: South of Koh Rong and smaller beaches are on the west and east coast. It is covered in dense forest, generally flatter (though there are sizable hills), and has noticeably less landmass in relation to its coastline. As of 2016, there is a ferry network between Sihanoukville and Koh Rong Sanloem.
- Koh Kaong Kang/Thass: Mangrove Island, Ile des Paletuviers (old French name), Koh Kaong Kang/Thass – one of the inner islands.
- Koh Koun: 'Child Island', 'Ile de Cone' (old French name), a small island between Koh Rong and Koh Rong Sanloem, has no beach and is uninhabited.
- Koh Tuich: 'Small Island', a tiny island off Koh Rong's Koh Tuich village. There is a little pagoda on it in service since around 2010.
- Koh Puos: also known as 'Snake Island' or 'Morakot Island'. This island lies 800 metres (2,625 ft) off Sihanoukville's Victory Beach. It is under development by Russian investors and converted into a luxury holiday destination. Snake Island is linked to the mainland via a regular road bridge since around July 2011. The bridge is not open to public traffic.
- Koh Dek Koul: This small island lies 7 kilometres (4 mi) off Victory Beach and only a further few hundred meters off Snake Island.
- Koh Bong Po-oun/Song Saa: – 'Siblings/Lovers Islands' – Les Frères (old French name), renamed Koh Song Saa. Two tiny islets off Koh Rong's north-east.
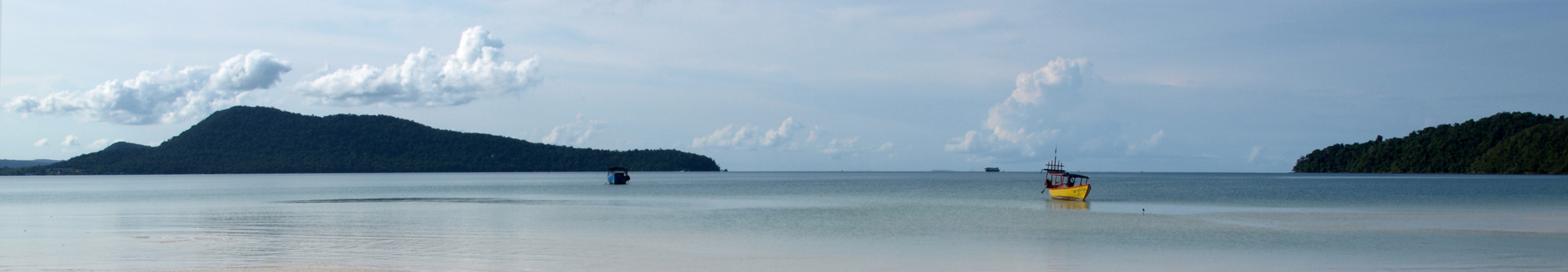
Koh Rong Sanloem's Saracen Bay

== Environment ==
The urban area suffers from polluted water supplies. Waste management policies and practices are deficient or lacking altogether.

== Climate ==
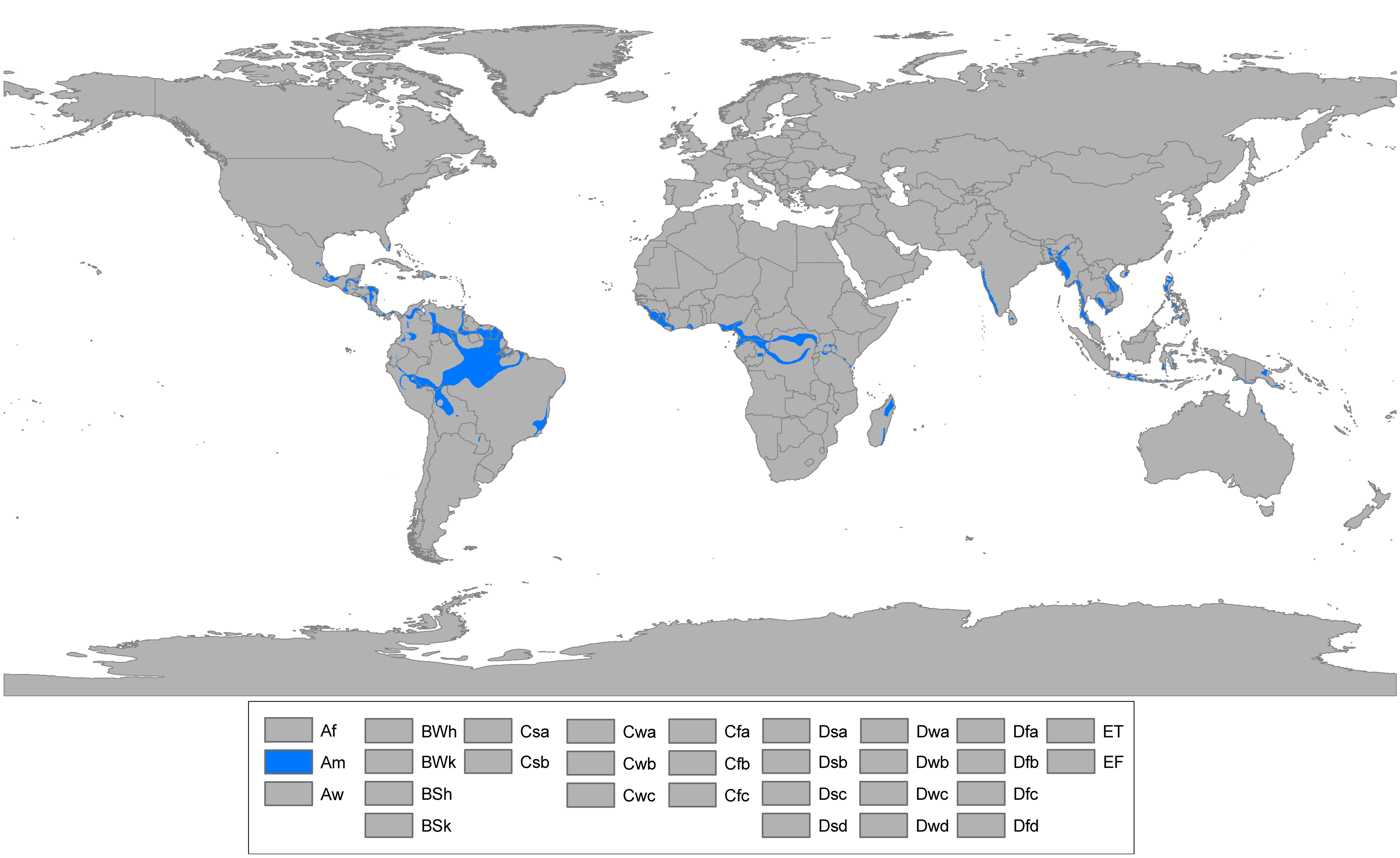
Worldwide zones of tropical monsoon climate (Am)

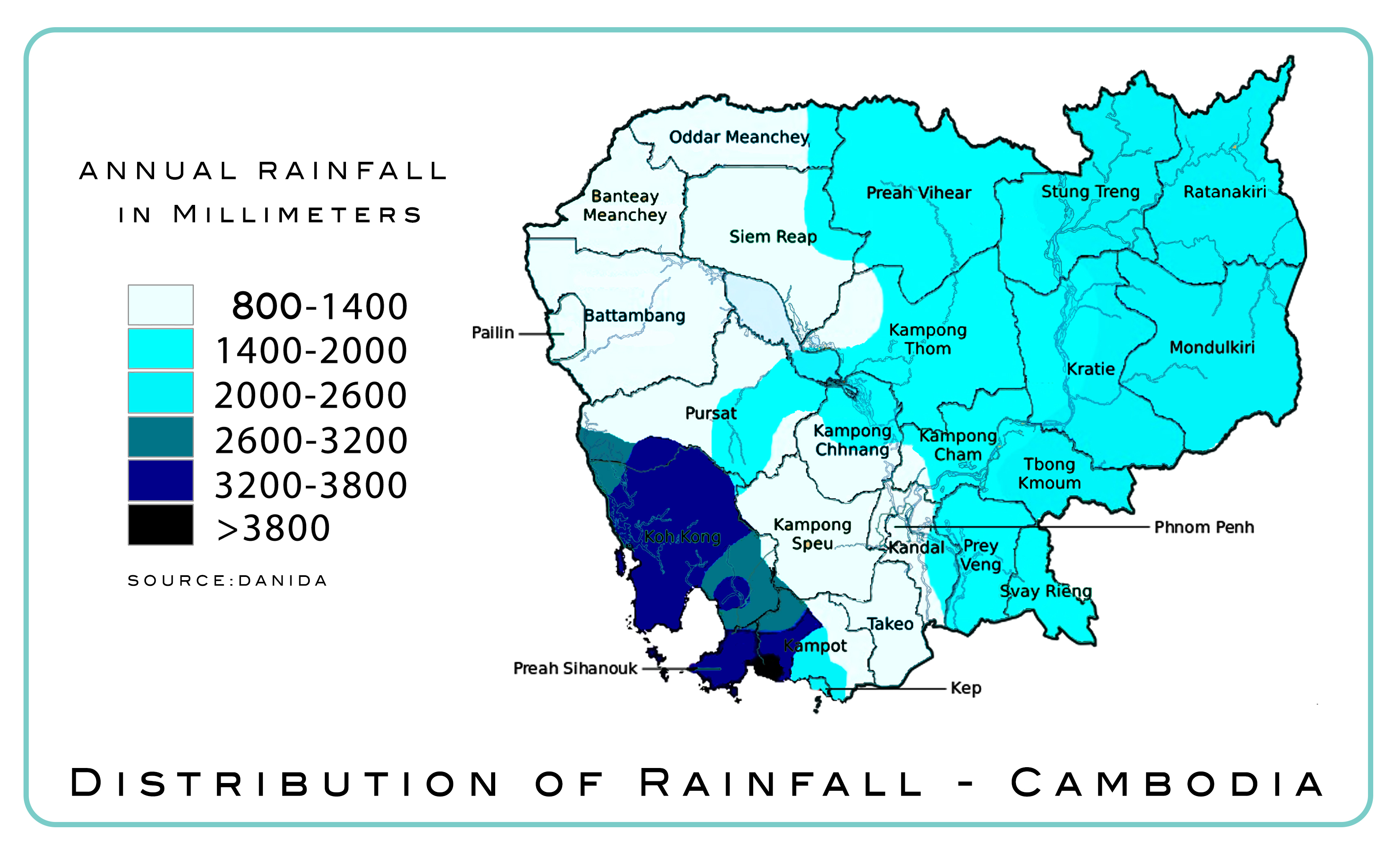
Map of rainfall regimes in Cambodia, source: DANIDA

Sihanoukville lies in the Tropical monsoon (Am) climate zone. The city has two seasons: a wet season and a dry season.

The mean maximum is about 31 °C (88 °F), the mean minimum about 25 °C (77 °F). Maximum temperatures higher than 32 °C (90 °F) are common however and, just before the start of the rainy season, they may rise to more than 38 °C (100 °F). Minimum night temperatures sporadically fall below 20 °C (68 °F) in January, the coolest month. May is the warmest month, although strongly influenced by the beginning of the wet season, as the area constitutes the easternmost fringe of the south-west monsoon. Tropical cyclones only rarely cause damage in Cambodia.

The total annual rainfall averages around 2,200 mm (87 in). The highest amounts fall in July, August, and September. Relative humidity is high throughout the year, usually exceeding 90 percent. During the dry season daytime humidity rates average around 50 percent or lower, climbing to about 90 percent during the rainy season. The wet season runs from April to November, and the dry season from December to March. However, as is common in places with this climate type, the dry season still sees some rainfall.

Climate data for Sihanoukville (1982–2024)
Month	Jan	Feb	Mar	Apr	May	Jun	Jul	Aug	Sep	Oct	Nov	Dec	Year
Mean daily maximum °C (°F)	31.0 (87.8)	31.3 (88.3)	31.0 (87.8)	32.4 (90.3)	32.6 (90.7)	31.2 (88.2)	30.8 (87.4)	30.5 (86.9)	30.3 (86.5)	30.7 (87.3)	30.6 (87.1)	30.4 (86.7)	31.1 (87.9)
Mean daily minimum °C (°F)	21.7 (71.1)	22.6 (72.7)	23.5 (74.3)	24.5 (76.1)	24.8 (76.6)	23.9 (75.0)	23.5 (74.3)	23.7 (74.7)	23.3 (73.9)	23.2 (73.8)	22.6 (72.7)	21.9 (71.4)	23.3 (73.9)
Average precipitation mm (inches)	27.1 (1.07)	31.4 (1.24)	76.4 (3.01)	145.0 (5.71)	292.9 (11.53)	508.9 (20.04)	562.3 (22.14)	617.0 (24.29)	487.2 (19.18)	309.5 (12.19)	117.7 (4.63)	41.2 (1.62)	3,216.6 (126.65)
Source: World Meteorological Organization

== Economy ==
Sihanoukville was established as an international marine gateway and as a result the local economy is largely defined by its deep water port and the nearby oil terminal. Attached is a regularly modernized cargo storage and logistics facility which serves numerous shipping companies, freight forwarders, suppliers, and maintenance contractors. All of these are based in the port's vicinity. The Phnom Penh–Sihanoukville transport corridor is the premier national trade route, accounting for about 75 percent of Cambodia's trade traffic.

Other sizable economic sectors of the city are fisheries, aqua-culture, and frozen shrimp processing, the garment industry, food production, and processing, the constantly growing tourism industry with a noticeably developed service branch and the associated real estate market. In 2023, it was reported that Sihanoukville had become a major centre for fraud factories, where thousands of human trafficking victims forced to work as "pig butchering" scammers after COVID-19 led to the closure of many of the city's casinos.

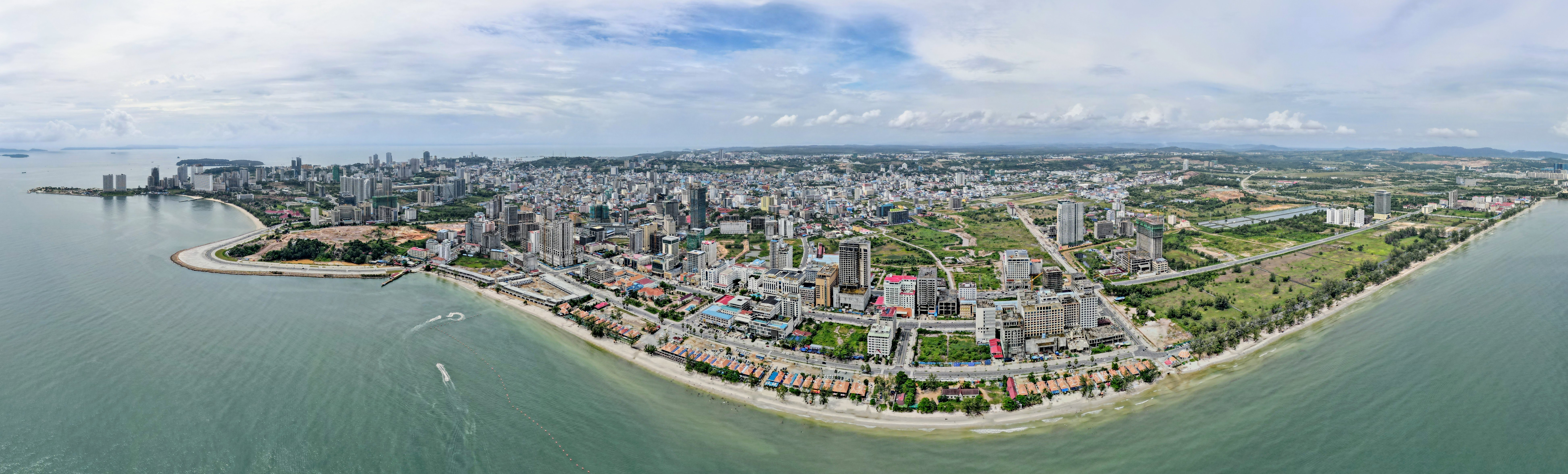
Panorama View of Sihanoukville from Otres Beach

=== Sihanoukville Special Economic Zone ===
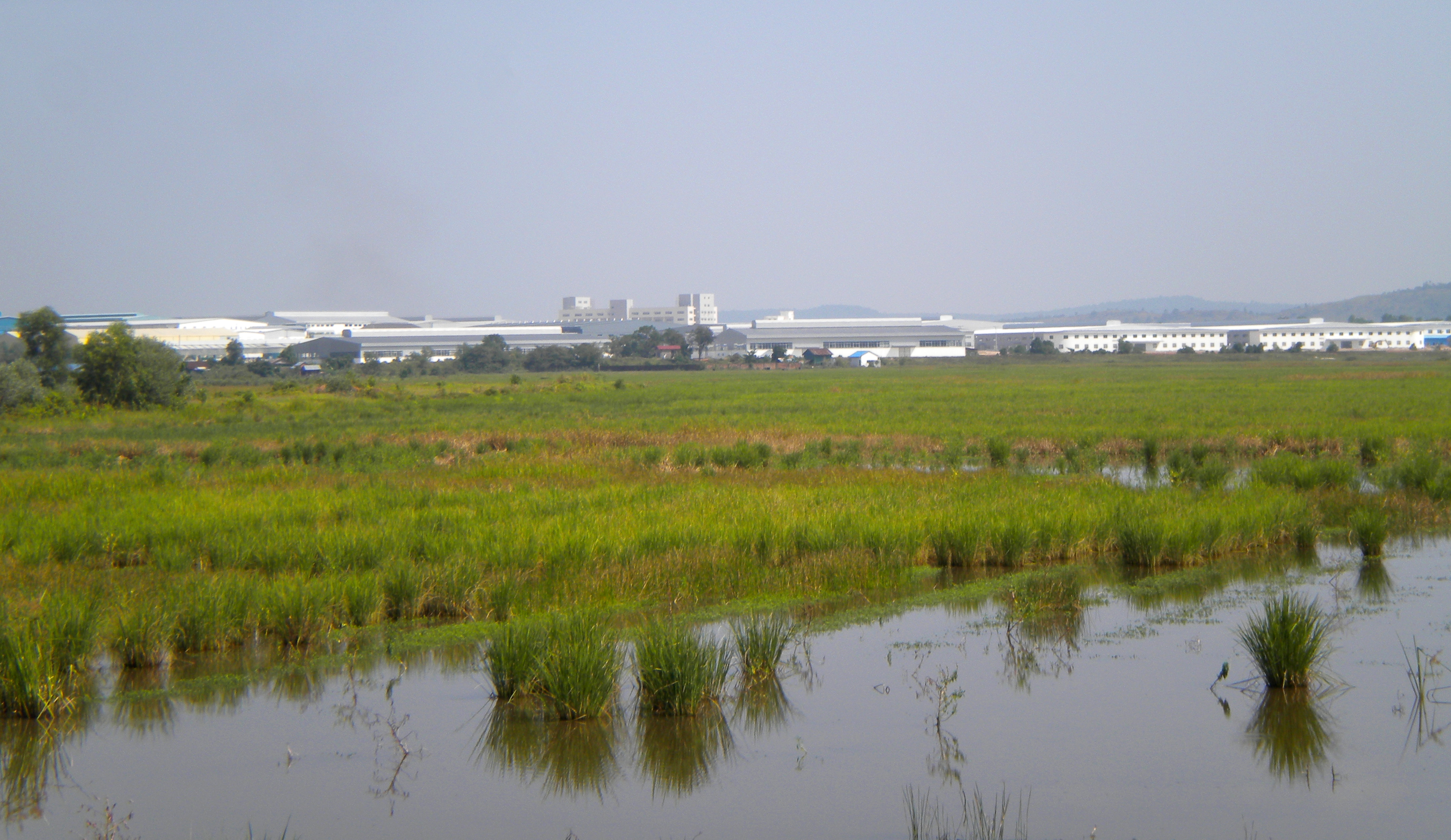
Sihanoukville's Special Economic Zone (SSEZ) as seen from National Highway No. 4 near Ream commune

The Sihanoukville Special Economic Zone (SSEZ) is an overseas economic and trade cooperation zone designed to promote favorable market conditions. It began with a focus on manufacturing consumer goods with the goal of transitioning to producing machinery, photovoltaic materials, and chemicals. The SSEZ received support from China's Ministry of Commerce and the Export-Import Bank of China. A sizable industrial center, exclusively composed of Chinese companies, has been developed since 2010. As of March 2020, the SSEZ had 174 factories employing more than 30,000 people.

=== Trade ===
The city's main export is garments, but it also produces and exports timber, logs, and rubber.

Cambodia is one of the few least developed countries (LDCs) to export over US$2 billion. Since it became the first LDC to join the World Trade Organization (WTO) in 2004, trade has steadily increased, and the U.S. has been its largest trading partner. Compared to $2.3 billion of exports to the U.S. and $153 million of exports to Cambodia in 2010, from January to October 2011, Cambodia's exports to the U.S. were $2.29 billion and U.S. exports to Cambodia were $152.6 million.

=== Economic prospects ===
An industrial zone has been established that includes petrochemical production and food processing based on local fisheries and other elements.

Foreign investment in Cambodia has increased significantly since 2004 led by Asian investors from countries such as Malaysia, China, Korea, Thailand, and Vietnam. Approved investment proposals by the Council for the Development of Cambodia totaled around US$500 million in 2011. Chinese investments have since modified the city's character, partly destroying its Cambodian aesthetics and culture. The Diplomat reported that "unchecked development by Chinese investors has come at a cost, freezing out locals and changing the city’s character." Evictions of native Cambodians due to economic investments by the Chinese has led to ethnic conflicts, with the government supporting the Chinese investors.

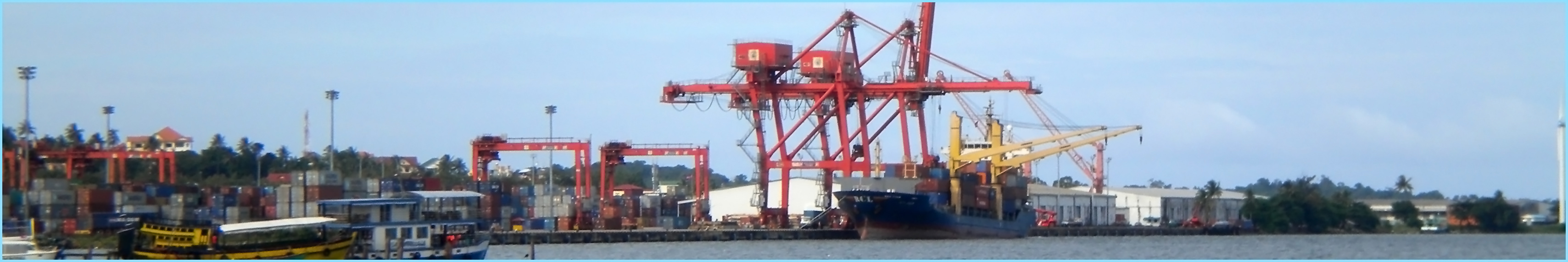
Sihanoukville Autonomous Port, October 2014

=== Sihanoukville Port Special Economic Zone ===
The Sihanoukville Autonomous Port has an independent administration. In combination with the related logistics and transport sector, it is the city's economic backbone.

At present, the total operational land area of the Sihanoukville Autonomous Port is around 124.76 ha. The Old Jetty was constructed in 1956 and became operational in 1960. It is 290 metres (950 feet) long by 28 metres (92 feet) wide and can accommodate four vessels with medium gross register tonnage (GRT) at both sides. The exterior berth is −8.50 to −13 metres (−27.9 to −42.7 feet) depth, while the interior berth is −7.50 to −8.50 metres (−24.6 to −27.9 feet) depth.

The Government of Cambodia had constructed a 350 m (1,148 ft) long new quay with −10.5 m (−34 ft) maximum draft in 1966. At present, this new quay can accommodate three vessels with −7 m (−23 ft) draft medium GRT. The construction of the container terminal, 400 m (1,312 ft) long by −10.5 m (−34 ft) depth and a 6.5 ha (16 acres) container yard was completed in 2007.

	Sihanoukville Autonomous Port Traffic Rates								
Item	2012	2013	2014	2015	2016	2017	2018	2019	2020
Gross Throughput (Tons)	2,659,785	3,012,217	3,423,919	3,763,296	4,040,155	-	5,328,348	6,547,756	6,601,804
Not Included Fuel	1,874,750	2,088,274	2,436,933	2,638,043	2,881,378	-	-	-	-
General Cargo	302,463	272,463	310,261	258,274	379,292	-	356,776	520,683	349,820
Cargo Containerized	1,572,287	1,815,811	2,126,672	2,379,969	2,502,086	-	3,388,923	4,148,729	4,363,820
Container Throughput (TEUs)	255,378	286,450	333,904	391,819	400,187	-	541,228	639,211	641,842

The primary destinations of Sihanoukville Autonomous Port are: Singapore, Hong Kong, Bangkok, Ho Chi Minh City, Shanghai, Laem Chabang, Yantian and Kaohsiung. It has a frequency of scheduled services of 38 per week.

== Transport ==
=== Roads and streets ===
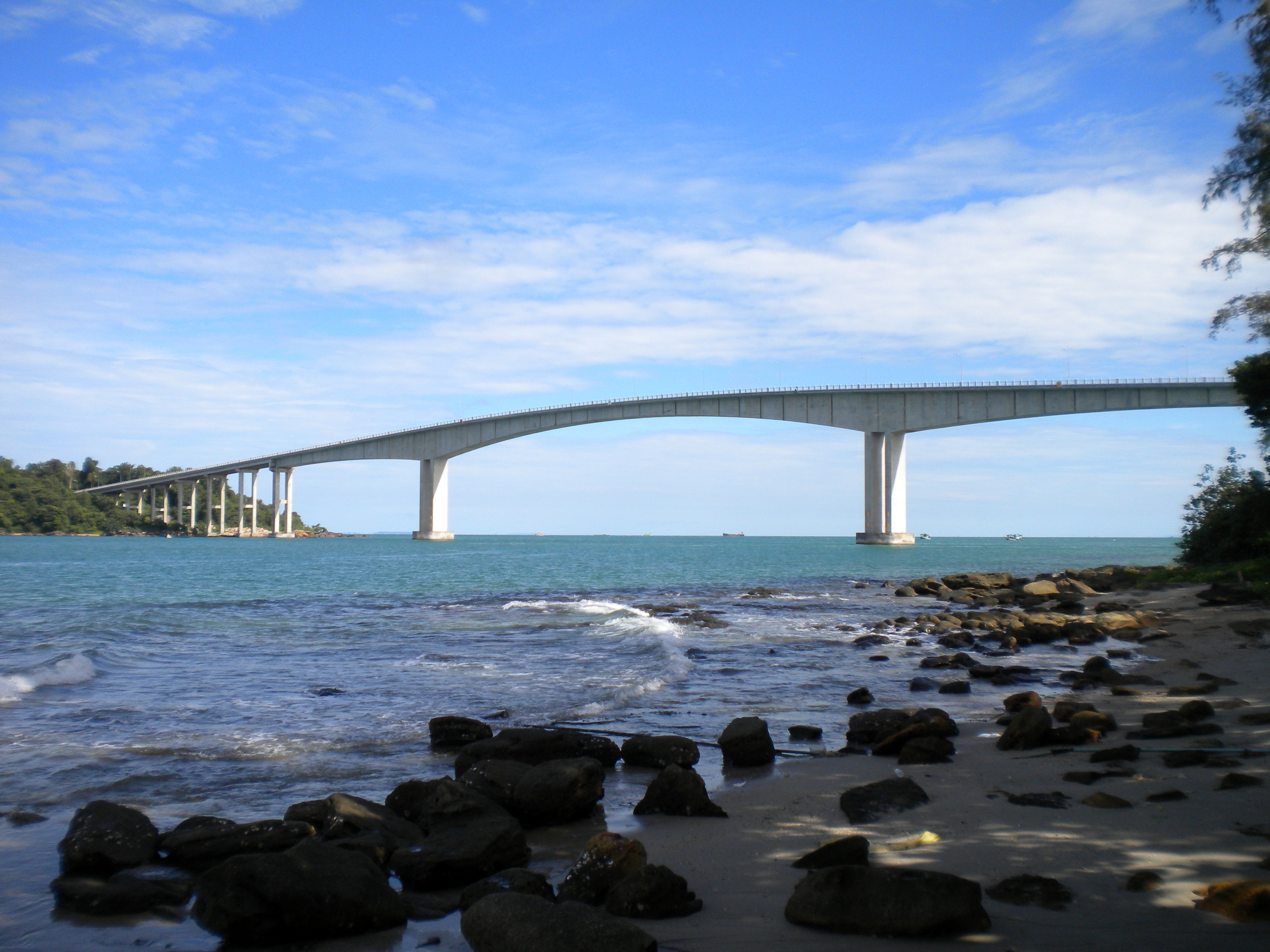
Snake island Bridge, as seen from Treasure Island Beach, October 2014

- Phnom Penh-Sihanoukville Expressway: A major new expressway linking Sihanoukville and Phnom Penh became operational in October 2022. China built the expressway, which has a significant role in Cambodia's infrastructure development through the Belt and Road Initiative.
- National Highway 4 (NH4): Phnom Penh and Sihanoukville are connected by National Road 4. The United States built and financed the road to accommodate heavy freight containers and gasoline tank trucks connecting the deep-water port with Phnom Penh. There were three toll stations along its length of around 250 km (155 mi). It is considered Cambodia's most dangerous road. Residential areas and the attached local traffic merges with the speeding traffic.
- National Highway 3: Connects Sihanoukville with Kampot Province. The road joins NR4 at Prey Nob District at the junction town of Veal Rinh. It is sealed but lacks traffic signs. Free-roaming cattle and other livestock regularly block traffic. The road underwent significant refurbishment in 2008 and forms part of an international "north-south economic corridor" from Kunming to Bangkok.
- National Highway 48: Connects Sihanoukville and Phnom Penh with Koh Kong Province to the southwest. The road ends at the Thai-Cambodian border.

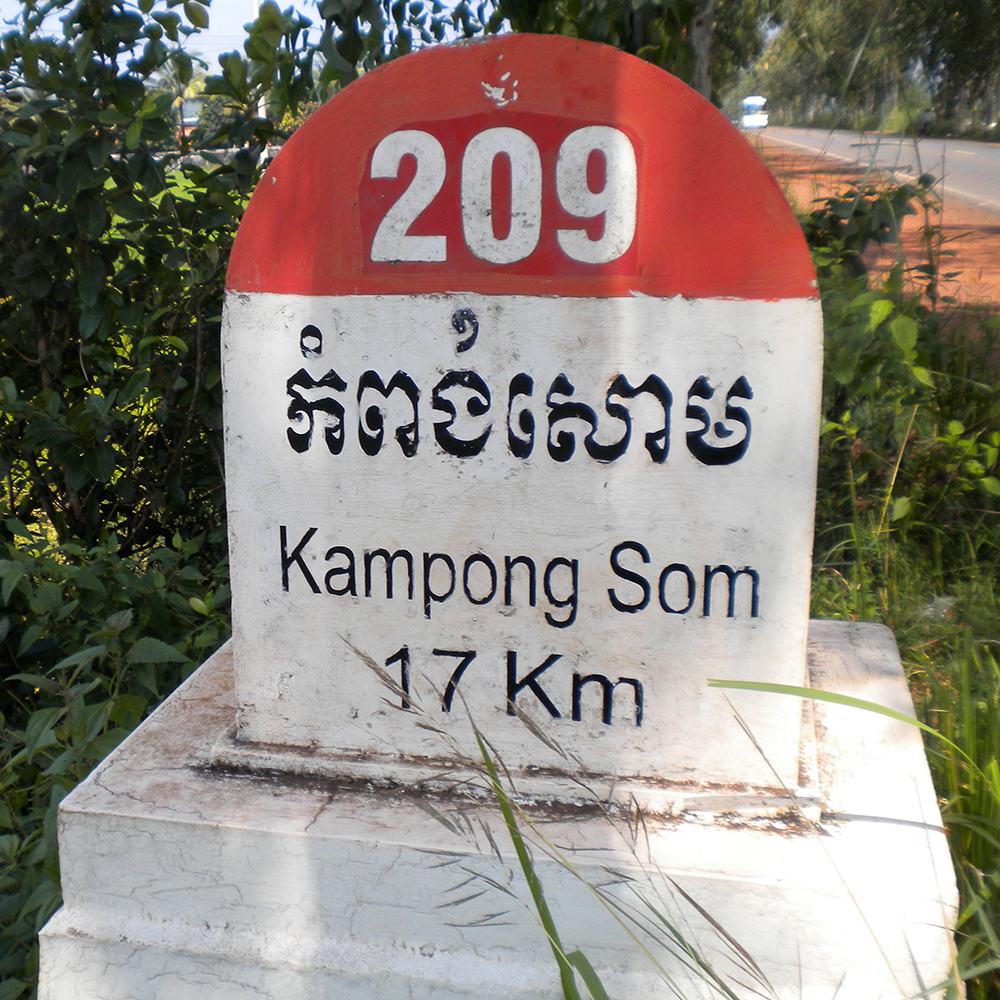
Mile stone of National Highway 4 near Ream commune

=== Urban traffic ===
Cambodia's official driving side is the right side of the road. There is no formally adopted road and road transport policy. Cambodia's traffic laws are like those of any other country, but with respect to the country's membership in the ASEAN, that requires recognition of ratified agreements. Regular traffic functions on only a basic level and in times of low density. Conduct is still traditional as smaller and slower vehicles are expected to yield to big ones. The city's law enforcement has been accused of failing to enforce international norms. A habit of running predictable checkpoints has developed. Tourists on rental bikes and common people are often stopped and forced to pay, often based on mere assumptions and unsupported claims. Drivers of vehicles with perceived social status remain generally unmolested. Consequently, the deterrent effect of these activities is very low.

In urban and residential areas, there is an overabundance of motorbikes due to the lack of any form of public transportation or taxi cars. Motorbike drivers often do not wear helmets, drive indiscriminately on any side of the street, and often have more than two passengers or are driven by children. Traffic lights are often ignored. In 2008, the government ordered the use of helmets, but the order was not thoroughly enforced.

The central long-distance bus station for all transport business operators is on National Highway 4 in the city's north-east near the Autonomous Port. Transport business operators maintain booking offices in the urban centers. Many companies compete with its buses' daily scheduled services. Buses operate from the early morning until the afternoon plus a daily night-bus/sleeper. Privately operated taxi stands for long-distance transportation are found at the central bus station, in the commercial urban center and the tourist center in the South.

The city has no public transportation. Local administration issues transport licenses for the informal urban system of motor-taxis (moto-dups) and tuk-tuks. The system is not administered by authorities, as anybody can become a motor-taxi or tuk-tuk driver. The overwhelming majority of drivers do not know street names or numbers.

=== Airport ===
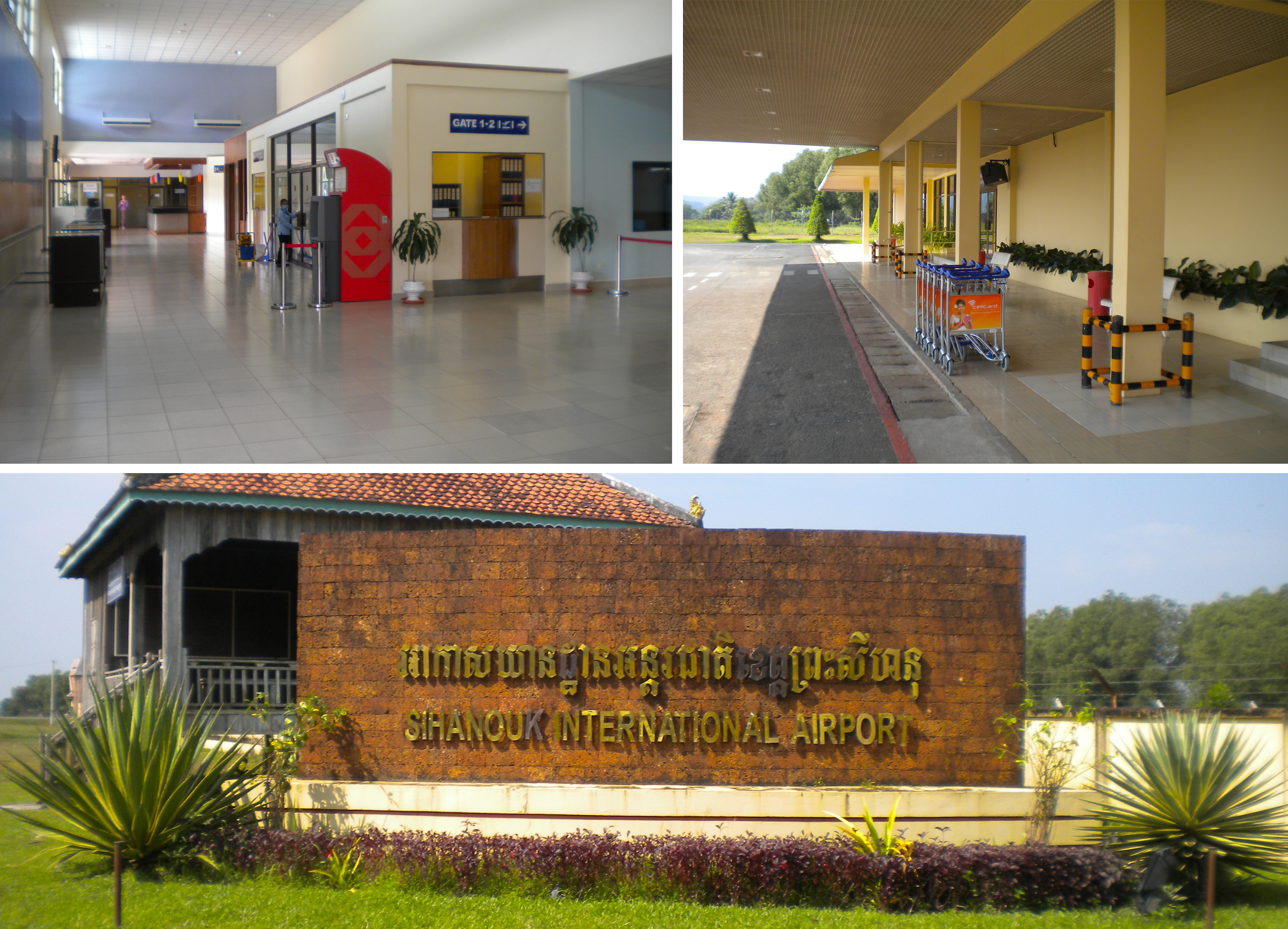
Sihanoukville airport

Sihanouk International Airport (International Air Transport Association code KOS) was formerly called Kang Keng Airport (ព្រលានយន្តហោះ កង កេង), named after the Minister of Health of the Khmer Republican regime during the 1970s. The airport is in Ream Commune in central Sihanoukville Province. It is near National Highway 4, around 500 metres (1,600 feet) from Ream beach atop a former mangrove lagoon, about 18 kilometres (11 miles) from Sihanoukville City.

As of July 2019, there were close to 200 flights from China to Sihanoukville every week.

=== Marine transport ===
The last daily national official Sihanoukville city–Krong Koh Kong marine ferry ceased operation with the completion of National Highway 48 in 2007.

Koh Rong Island and Koh Rong Sanloem Island have daily ferry services.

Marina Oceania, the first marina in Cambodia operational and fully equipped since 2013 for yachts and boats up to 25 metres (82 feet) with 4-to-5-metre-deep (13-to-16-foot) berths for 20 boats. It is at the local port's pier, near Koh Preab Island. (coordinates: 10°39'59"N / 103°30'41"E).

=== Rail transport ===
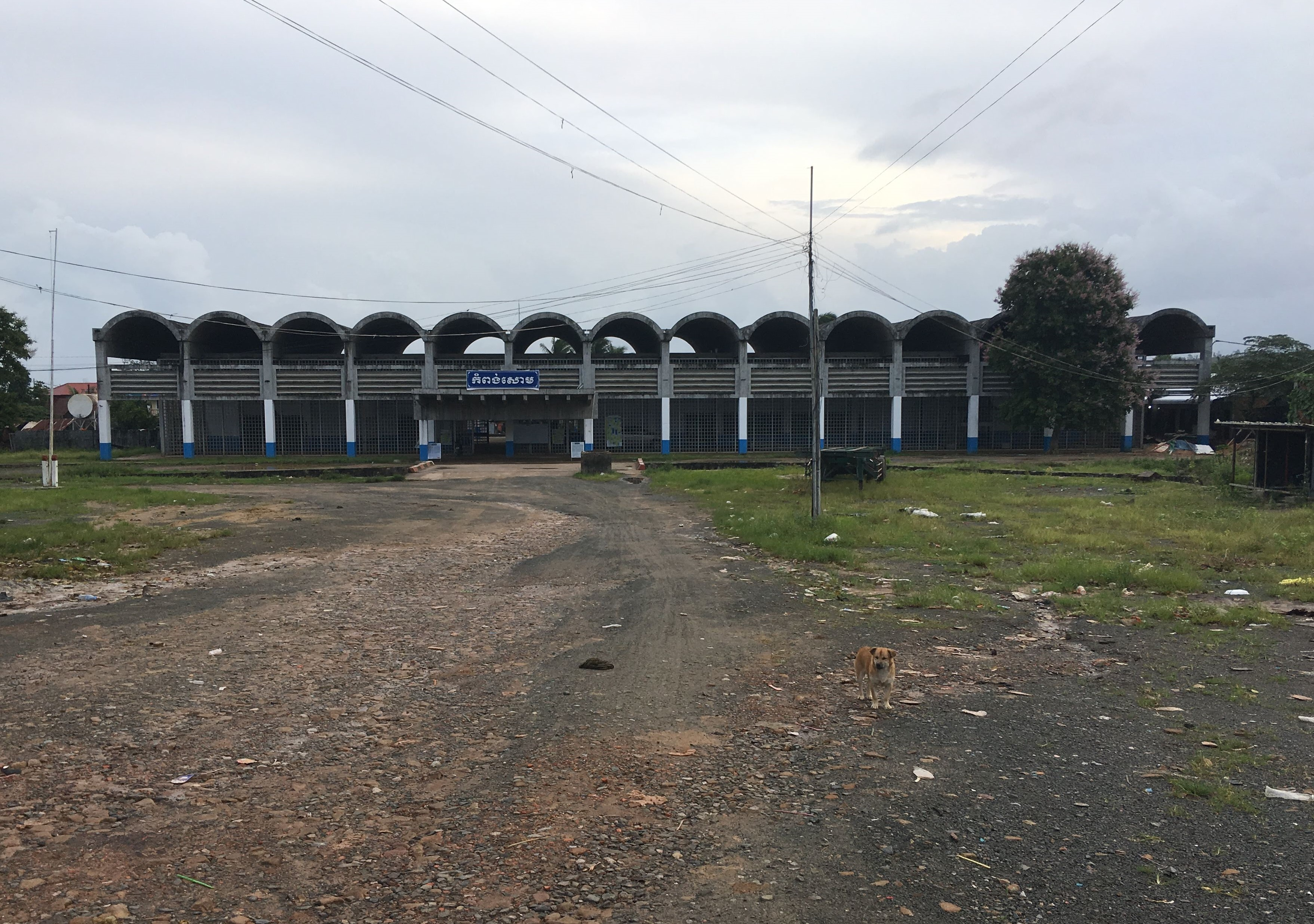
Sihanoukville railway station

Cambodia's railway network was reconstructed for freight transport during the last years by Toll Holdings, which obtained a building and maintenance concession from the Royal Cambodian Railway. The "Southern line", constructed from 1960 to 1969 with a length of 264 km (164 mi), connects Sihanoukville Port Special Economic Zone with Phnom Penh.

A daily passenger train service runs from the station near the Autonomous Port used to manage passenger train transportation to Phnom Penh via Kampot.

== Demographics ==
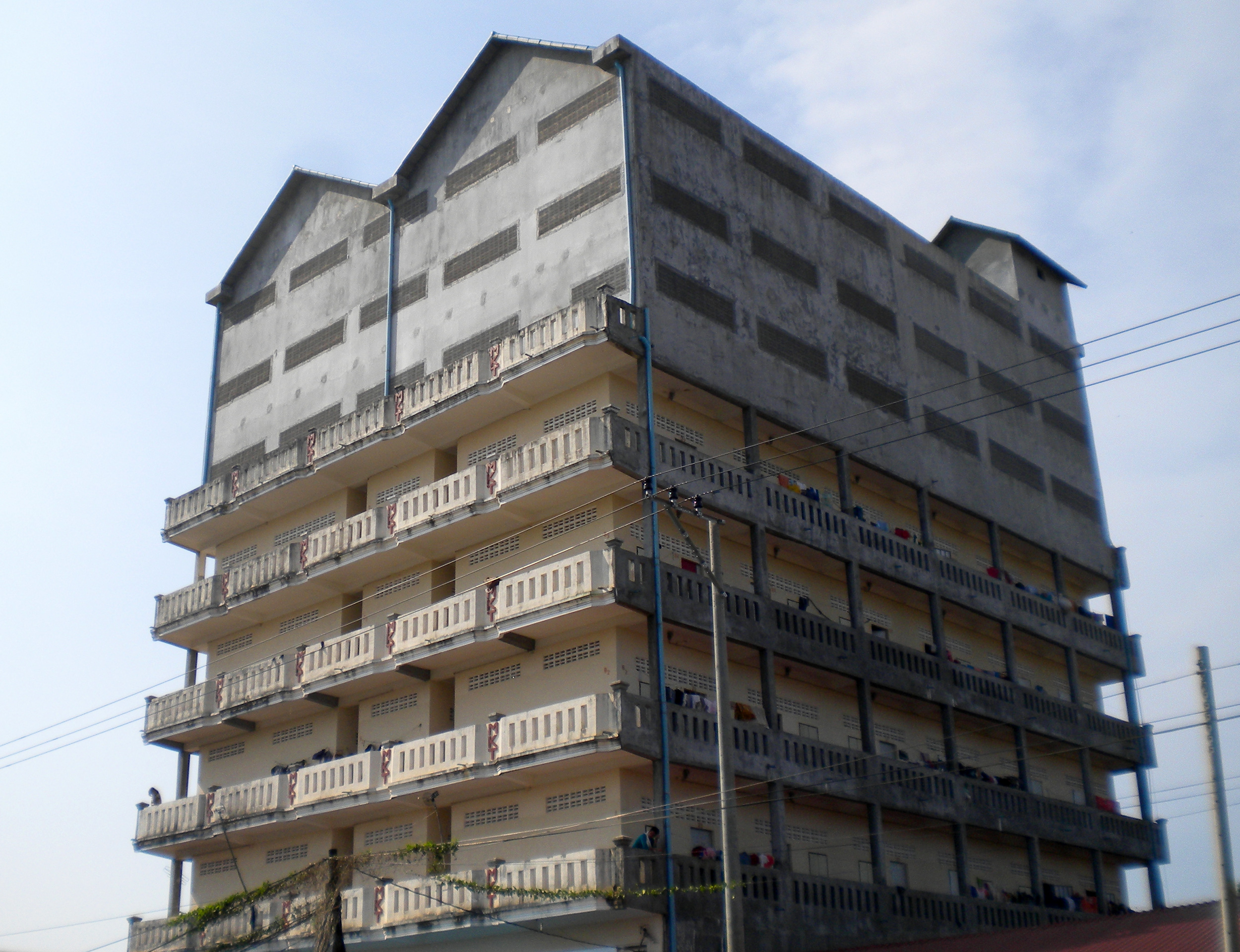
Tenement building with edible-nest swiftlet farming on top floor

Apart from descendants of the indigenous inhabitants, the city's population is no older than three generations as the product of recent history, such as the Cambodian diaspora and Cambodian humanitarian crisis of and after the Pol Pot era. With the arrival of displaced refugees in subsequent decades and centuries, a non-Khmer, mixed Asian population grew to a high proportion of the total population in the core urban areas. The 2008 Cambodian census counted 89,846 inhabitants of Sihanoukville and approximately 66,700 in its urban center.

Population projections for Sihanoukville Province, 2008–2016
Year	2008	2009	2010	2011	2012	2013	2014	2015	2016
Total	229,205	235,095	241,154	247,355	253,654	260,034	266,470	272,933	279,419
Male	114,680	117,735	120,872	124,076	127,324	130,607	133,913	137,227	140,545
Female	114,525	117,360	120,282	123,279	126,330	129,427	132,557	135,706	138,874
Annual growth		2.57	2.58	2.57	2.55	2.52	2.47	2.43	2.38
Sex ratio	100.1	100.3	100.5	100.6	100.9	101.0	101.1	101.2	101.3
Median age	21.8	22.3	22.8	23.3	23.7	24.2	24.7	25.1	25.6

In addition to Khmer, ethnic groups like Vietnamese, Chinese, Cham, Thai, Korean, French, British, Europeans, Australians, and Americans live in the urban area. Krong Preah Sihanouk has a relatively high Human Development Index (HDI) of 0.750, compared to the national average HDI of 0.523.

In late 2018, Channel News Asia estimated that the province's Chinese resident population had risen to 78,000.

Nearly 80,000 mainland Chinese workers, developers, and investors accounted for 90% of the city's expat population as of 2019. Sihanoukville is one of the major cities on China's One Belt One Road Initiative.

== Health ==
Some government hospitals and other health units have been rehabilitated so that they are autonomous entities, staffed with qualified personnel. At the same time, modern standard private clinics, including local and foreign service providers, are increasing in number and competing with state-owned hospitals.

Sanitation practices in rural Cambodia are often primitive. Water sources are often the same ones used for bathing, washing clothes, and disposing of waste products. Sewage disposal is nonexistent in most rural and suburban areas.

== Security ==
Sihanoukville faces challenges related to crime, security, and safety. It is often the focus of scandals linked to serious organized crime, petty crime, and corruption. The city police, especially the traffic police, have often been shown to be corrupt and ineffective, and investigations have uncovered connections to organized crime and drug trafficking.

Embassies and consular officials have issued cautionary statements about travel to Sihanoukville following gang disputes and several high-profile murders, rapes, and robberies as well as several unexplained deaths of foreigners.

Russian tycoon Sergei Polonsky was deported from Cambodia in 2015 to face embezzlement charges in Russia after years spent clashing with other Russians on the streets of Sihanoukville.

== Expansion of organized crime ==
Sihanoukville is an epicenter of human trafficking and organized crime. Its casino industry expanded rapidly from the early 2010s, with new venues built to cater mostly to the growing Chinese tourist market. In the mid-2010s, online gambling operations became established, and alongside them online fraud operations. These industries quickly boomed, leading to a ban on online gambling in 2019, which did not eradicate illegal online operations from the city. A series of major raids on online crime sites occurred in 2022, and since then there has been sporadic law enforcement action against specific sites. The United Nations Office on Drugs and Crime has documented how as casinos in Cambodia and other countries across the region have developed, associated organized crime, scams, and money laundering have become an increasingly severe threat to the rule of law and sustainable development of the region.

== Culture ==
Most municipal inhabitants are of East Asian descent, which characterizes the pan-East Asian beliefs and ideas. Cambodian culture is of distinct ancient Khmer origin, accompanied by century-old moderate Chinese and Vietnamese cultural influences. Sihanoukville citizens celebrate Cambodian New Year (April), Chinese New Year (between January and February), Water Festival (November), Pchum Ben (honor to the ancestors in October), Kathen Ceremony (offerings to the monks), and 8 January (Day of Cambodian – Vietnamese Friendship), among others under the ruling Cambodian People's Party (CPP).

Many urban families of Chinese or Sino-Khmer descent in Sihanoukville city have for most of Cambodia's history constituted the commercial elite and urban upper classes. There is a dedication to Confucian work ethics.

=== Tourism ===
The city has around 150 regular hotels in all price categories among an undisclosed number of guest houses.

As a tropical seaside resort, Sihanoukville's nightlife is heavily influenced and characterized by the city's large number of beaches along the central tourist area between the Golden Lion Plaza and the Ochheuteal/Serendipity Beaches.

== Notable people ==
- Vannda - musician.
- Jordan Windle - Olympic diver, banned by U.S. Center for SafeSport

== Administration ==
Sihanoukville is the capital city of Sihanoukville province and is governed by its deputy governor. It occupies the greater part of four of the five communes or Sangkat (Sangkat Muoy Commune, Sangkat Pi Commune, Sangkat Bei Commune, Sangkat Buon Commune) of Sihanoukville provinces' Mittakpheap District. The port has its own autonomous administration. The Sangkats are divided into 19 villages.

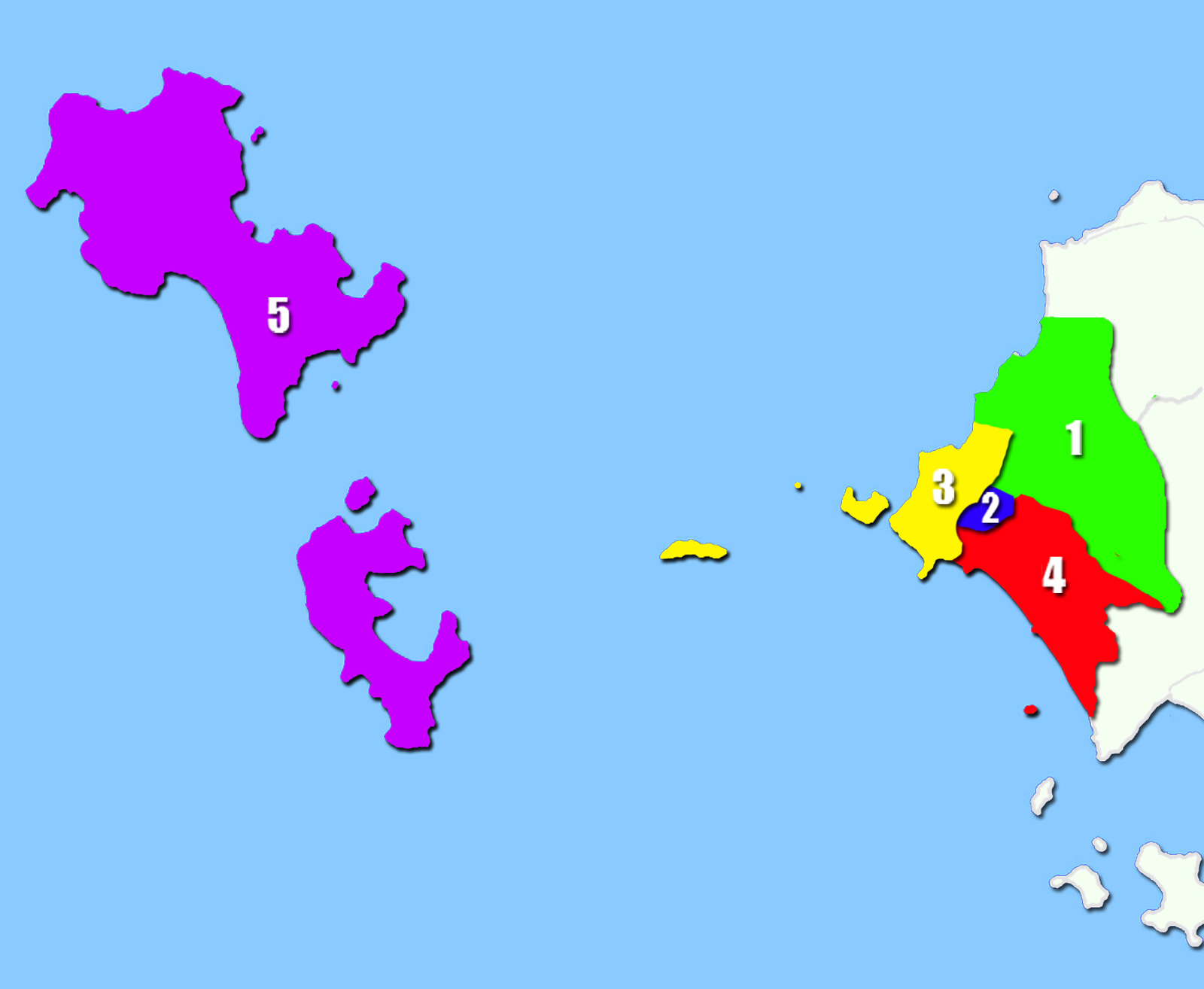
Sangkats of Sihanoukville's Mittakpheap district

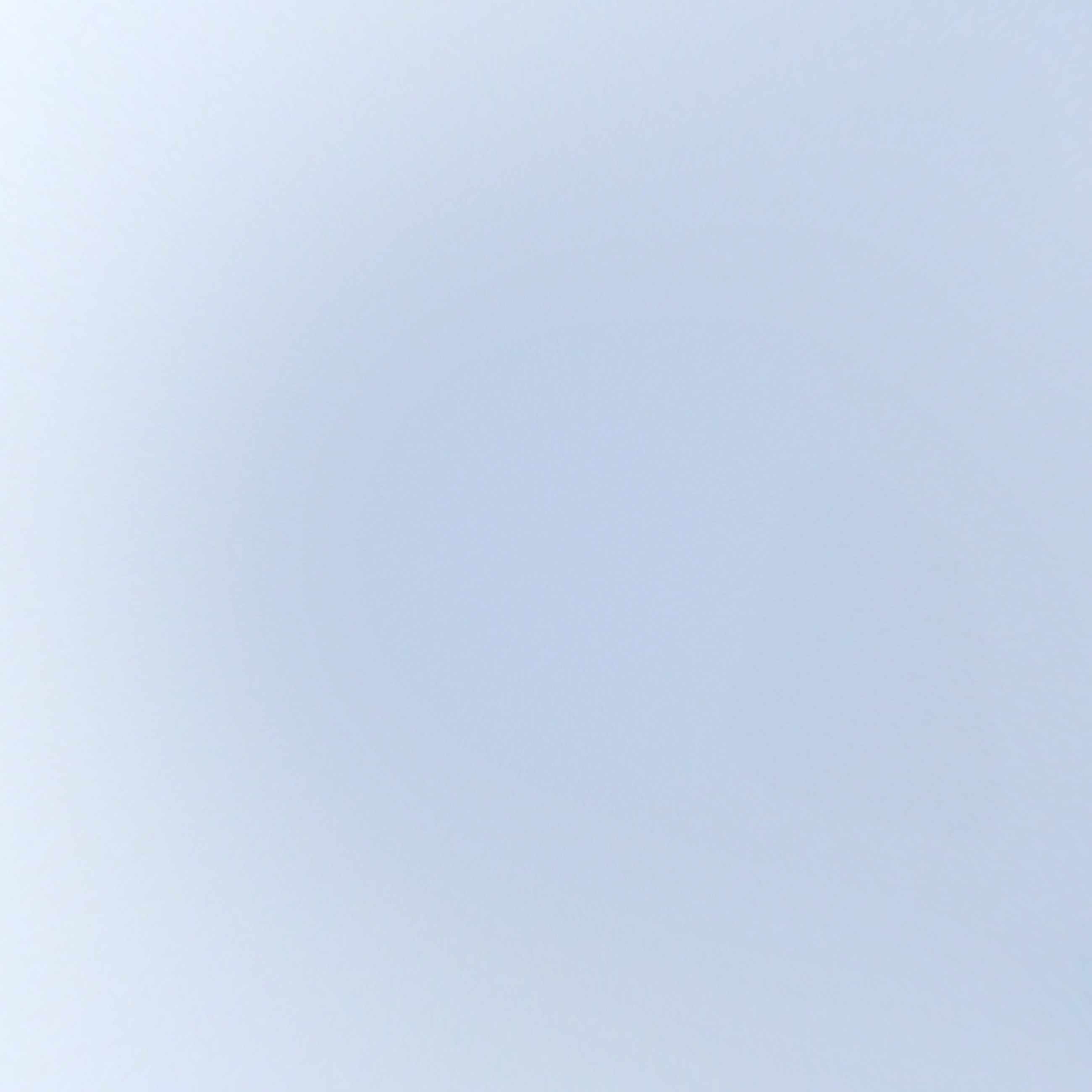
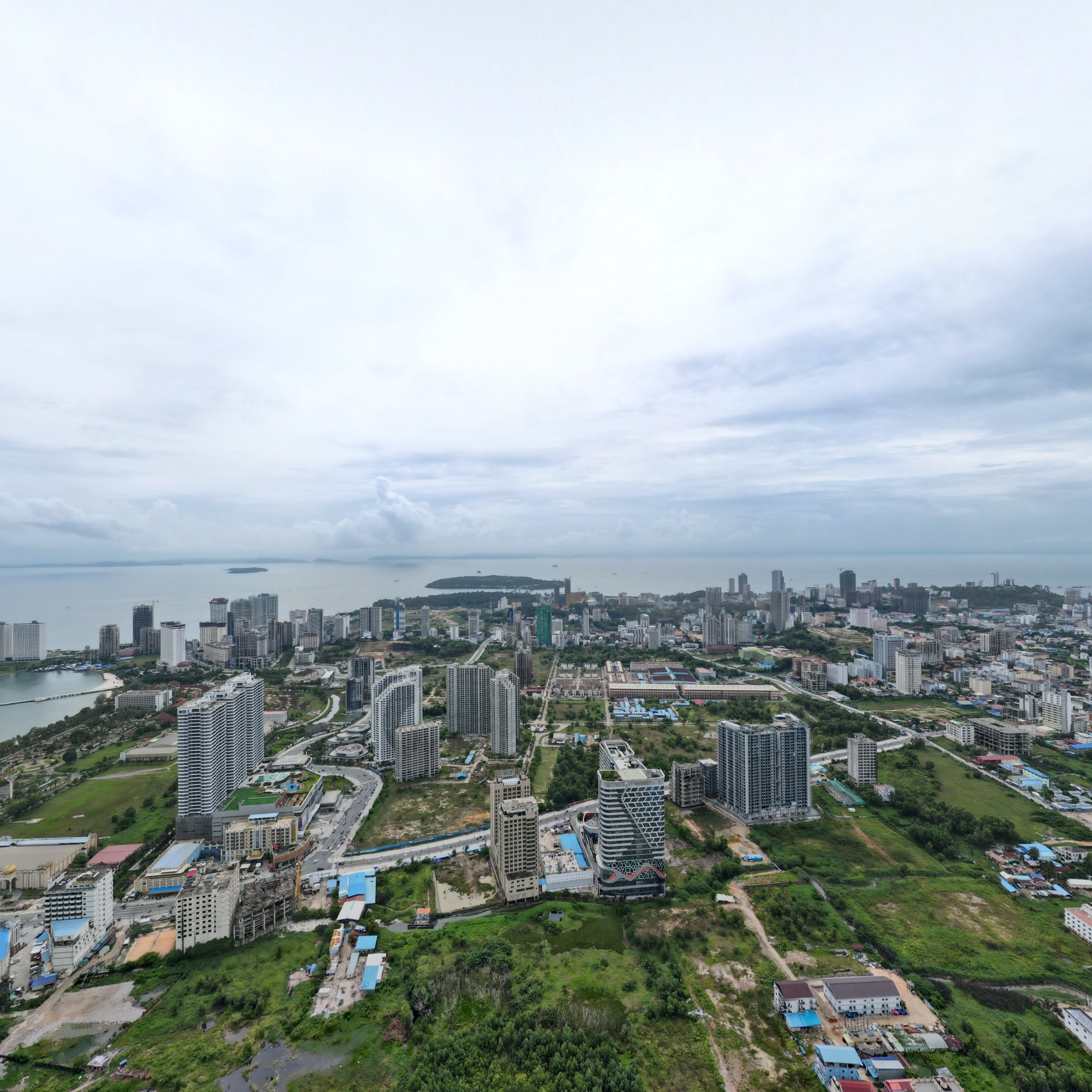
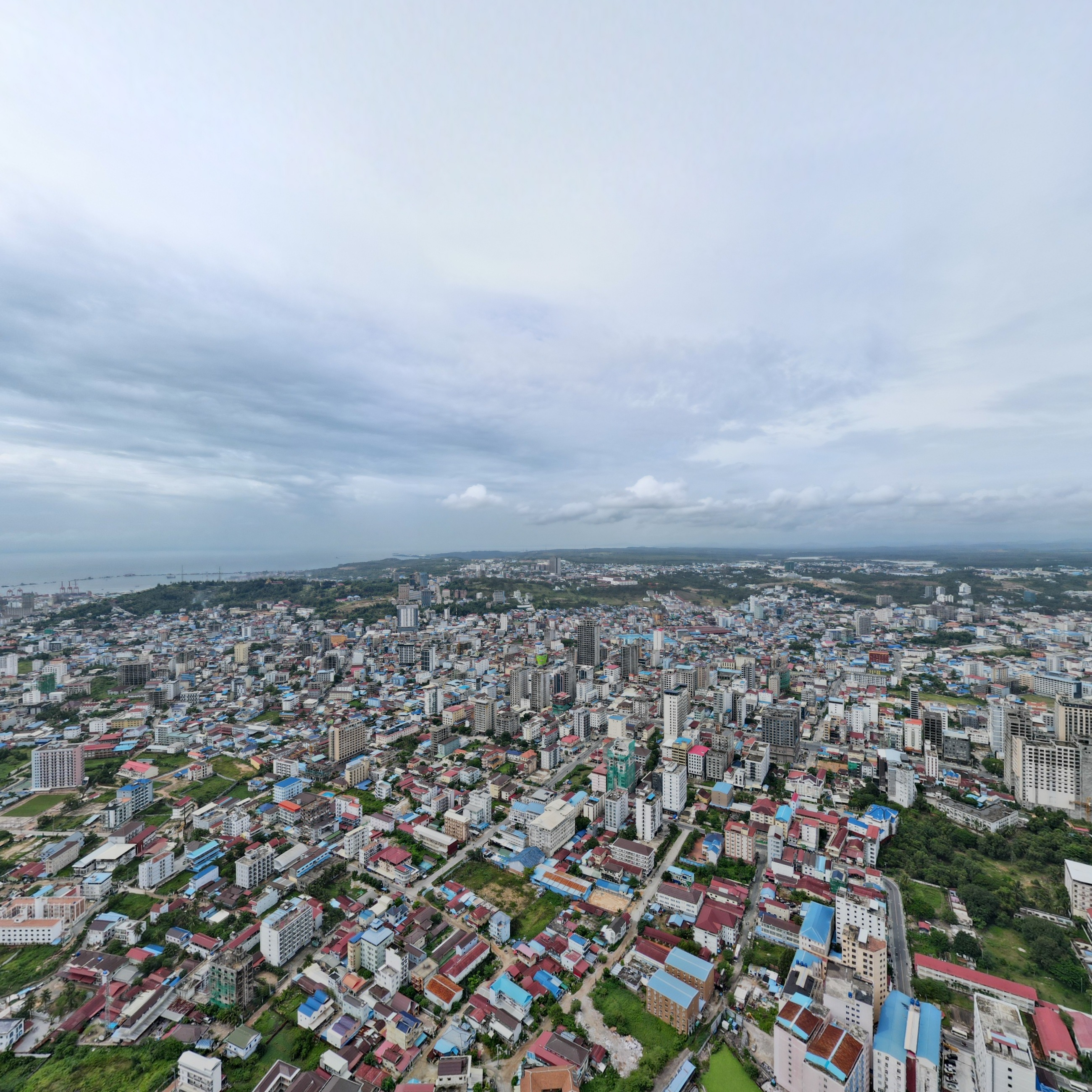
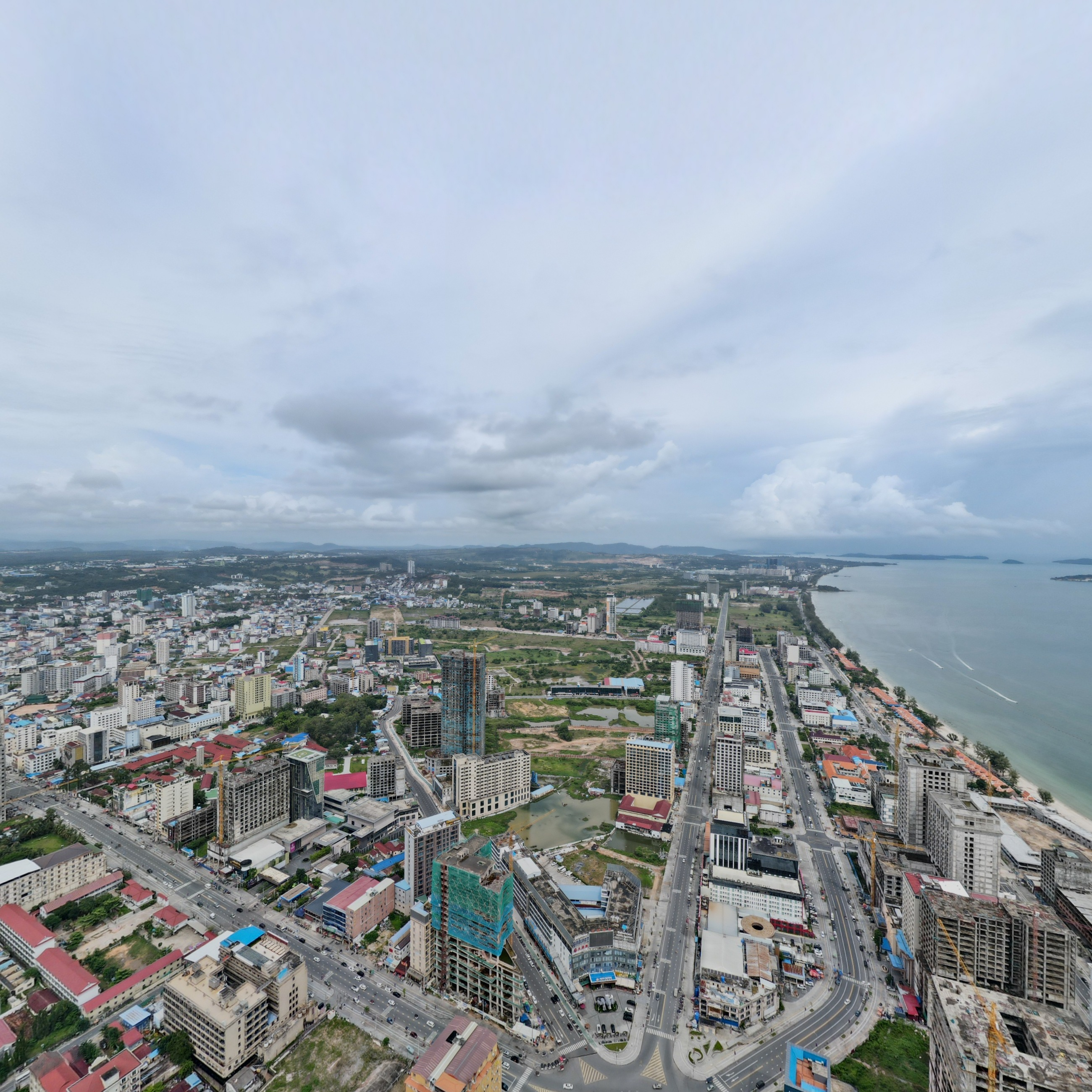
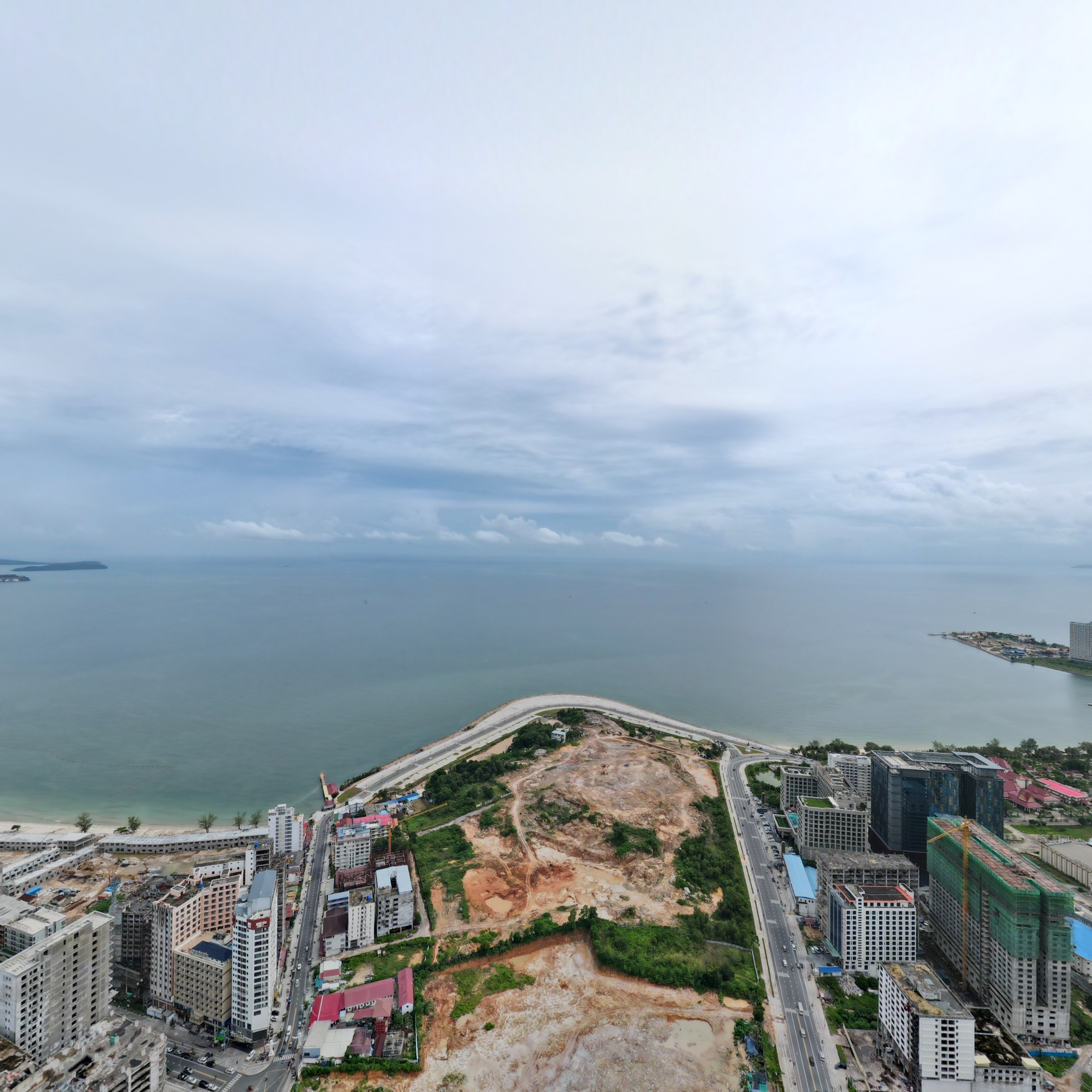
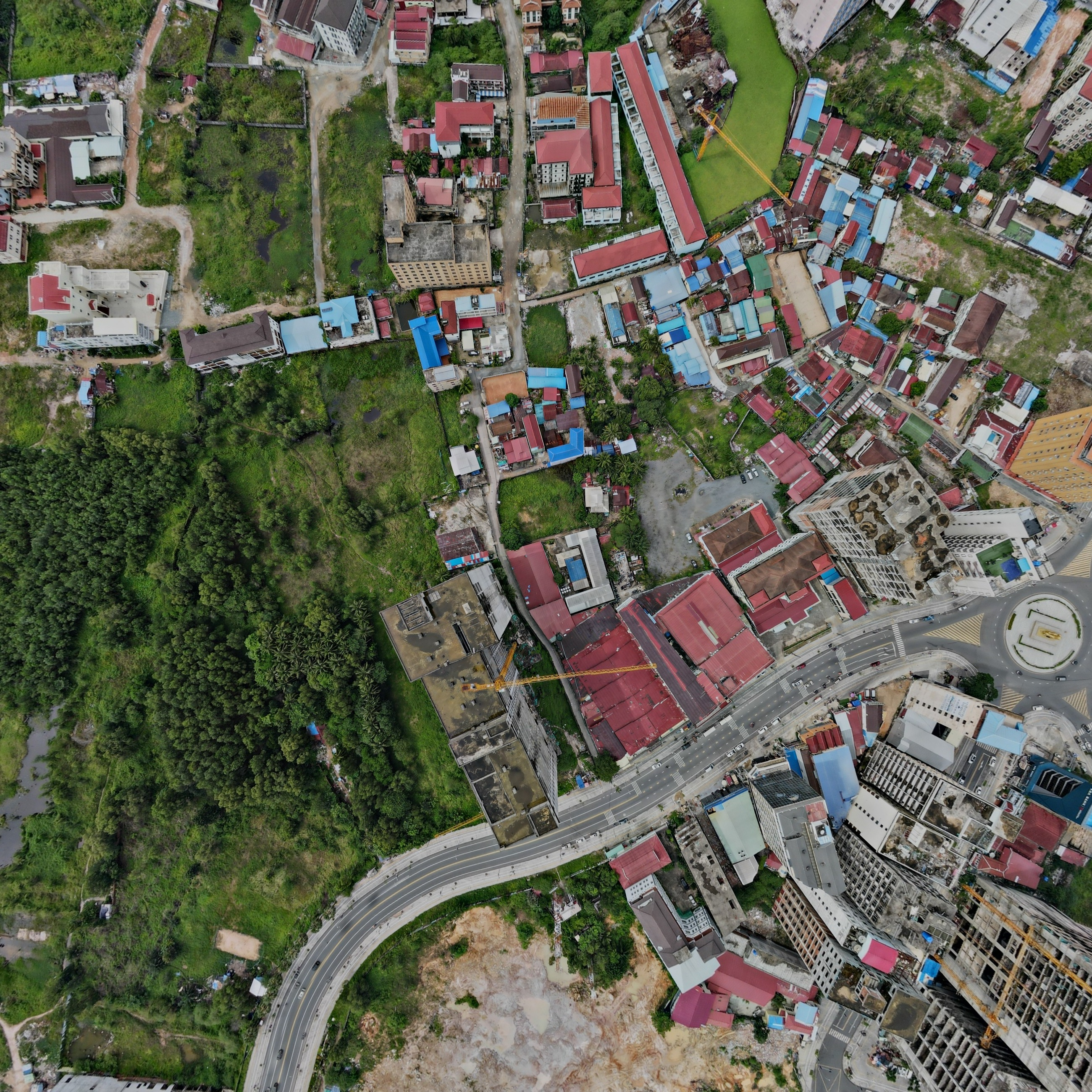
360° Panorama of Sihanoukville City

The communes of Mittakpheap District
ISO Code	Commune	Romanization	Population	Sections	Urban
1801-1	សង្កាត់ មួយ	Sangkat 1	37,440	3	Yes
1801-2	សង្កាត់ ពីរ	Sangkat 2	25,142	3	Yes
1801-3	ស្ទឹងហាវ បី	Sangkat 3	13,108	3	Majority
1801-4	សង្កាត់ បួន	Sangkat 4	13,108	6	Majority
1801-5	សង្កាត់ កោះរ៉ុង	Sangkat Koh Rong	1,108	4	No

=== Autonomous Port ===
Sihanoukville Autonomous Port lies within Sangkat 1 with an area of around 124.76 hectares (308.3 acres). The port is 18 kilometres (11 mi) from the Kaong Kang Airport and 4 kilometres (2.5 miles) from Sihanoukville town center. Ships' passengers are allowed to visit Sihanoukville town. The terminal itself offers toilets, restaurants, food booths, ATMs, and convenience stores.

=== Kampong Seila ===
Kampong Seila district, which belonged to Koh Kong Province, was transferred to Sihanoukville Province in January 2009: "The administrative boundaries of Preah Sihanouk municipality and Koh Kong Province shall be adjusted by sub-dividing land from Kampong Seila District in whole and partial land of Sre Ambil District in Koh Kong Province to Preah Sihanouk municipality." Officials were assigned to create a national workshop—also in relation to other provinces—and perform administrative tasks. The National Institute of Statistics of Cambodia refers in its most recent and preliminary studies to a successful integration of the district, including maps, although official statistics and numbers are expected to come with the next full report. Preah Sihanouk Province's new official domain has incorporated Kompong Seila District.

== Religion ==
Theravada Buddhism is the state religion in Cambodia, with the pagoda. The most prominent pagodas in the city:

- Upper Pagoda, "Wat Chotynieng", or "Wat Leu"; on a hill, overlooking Sihanoukville bay and dedicated to Samdech Preah Sangareach Chhoun Nath, a Cambodian Buddhist leader, who lived before the Khmer Rouge rule (1975).
- Lower Pagoda, "Wat Krom", in Sihanoukville town. It is dedicated to Yeay Mao, a popular southern Cambodian ancestral spirit surrounded by an illustrious legend. Both - Wat Leu and Wat Krom - are named according to their local geographic location, on top of the hill and down at the bottom of the hill.
- O'tres Pagoda, "Wat Otres", in Otres village. It is by the Ou Tro Jet River, it features a river water garden and sculptures of ancestral spirits in the form of animals both real and legendary.

Sihanoukville city is also home to minor communities of other religions such as: Catholics, Muslims, Protestants and Taoists. Places of worship include:

- St. Michael's Church: It is the center of the Catholic communities. The church was built in 1960 by sailors, it is on the same hill as the Upper Pagoda, facing the sea.
- Iber Bikhalifah Mosque: It is the religious center of the local Muslim community. It is in Sihanoukville town, just in the populous, central Psah Leu (upper market) area.

Religion in Cambodia
Religion	percent
Theravada Buddhism	92%
Mahayana Buddhism	3%
Islam	1.6%
Christianity	0.2%
Others	3.2%

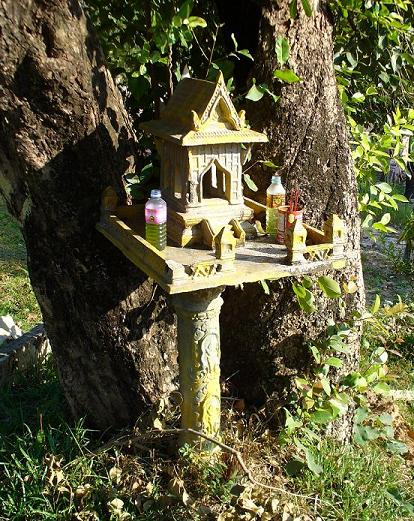
A shrine for the ancestor's spirits.

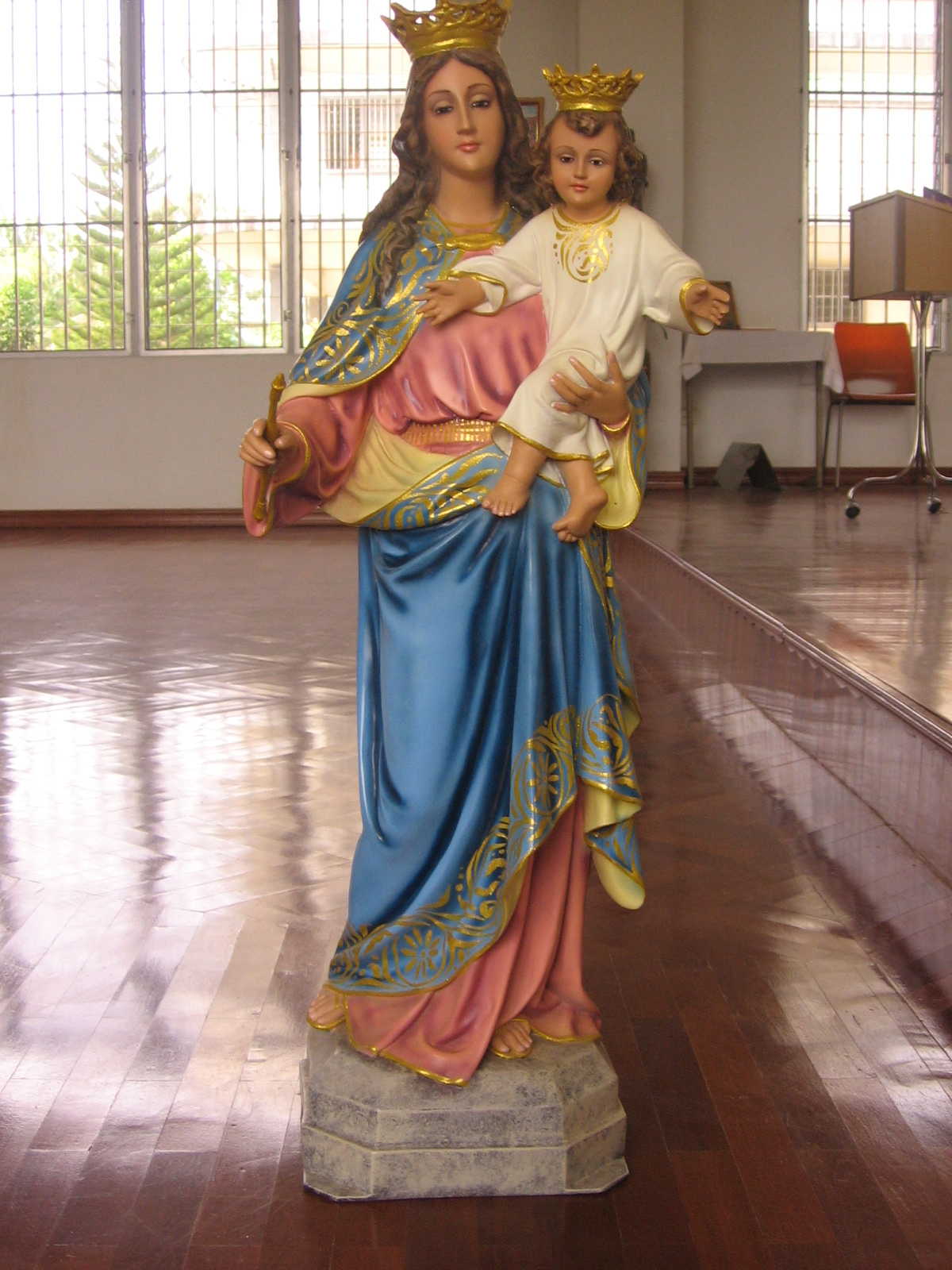
Statue of Mary at Saint Francis de Sales Chapel

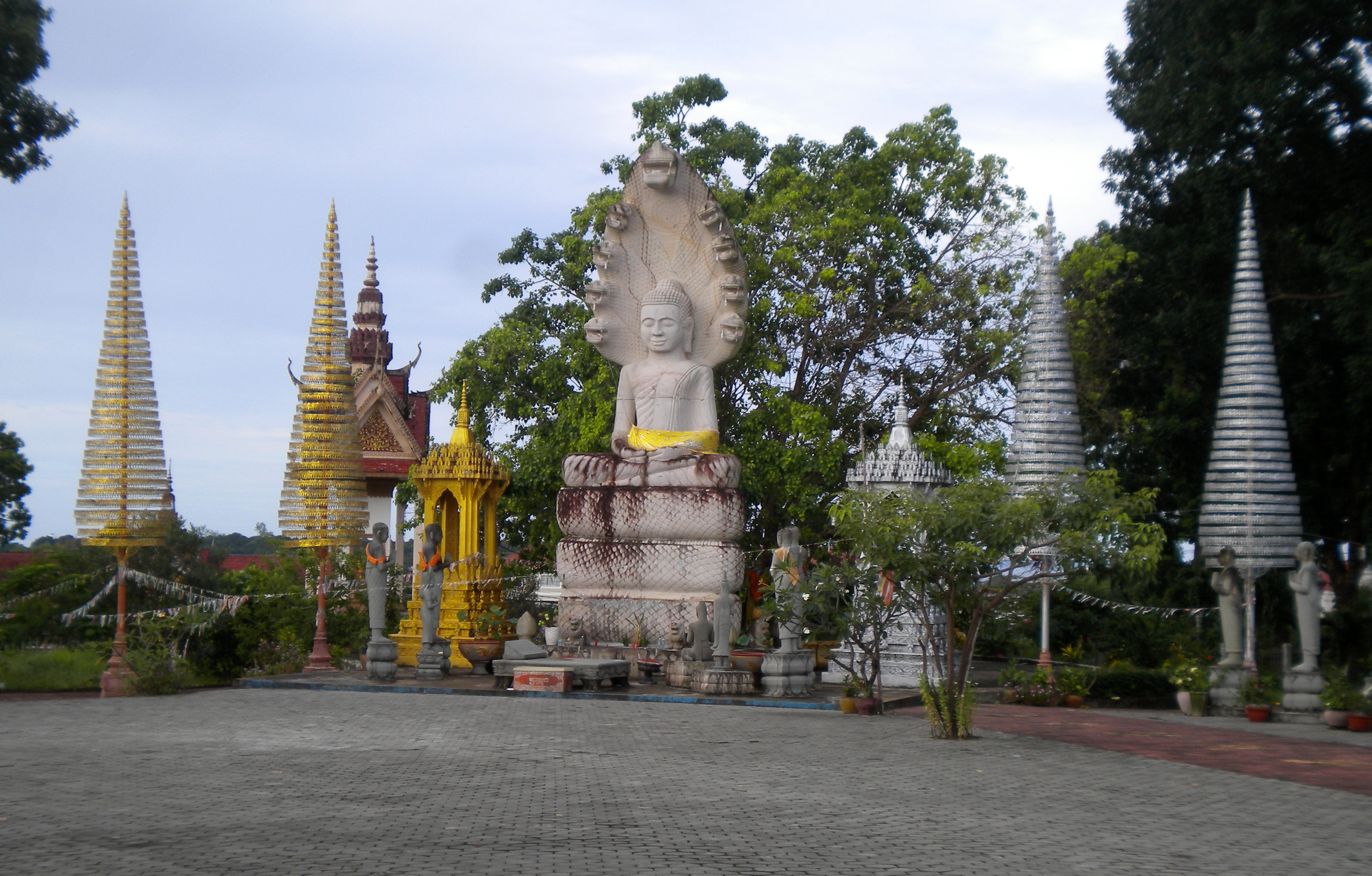
Big Buddha on Victory Hill, October 2014

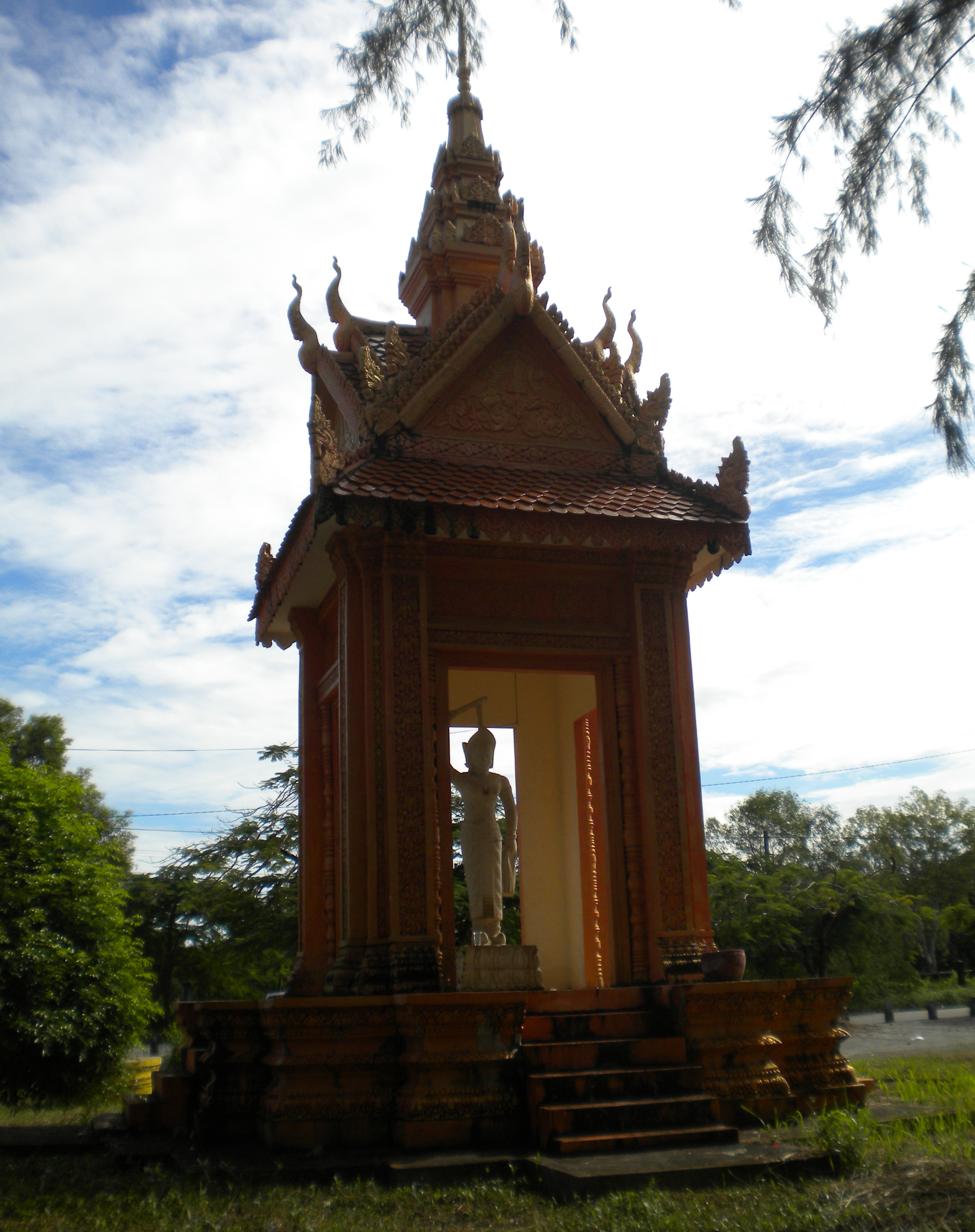
Shrine to Yeay Mao at Independence Beach, October 2014

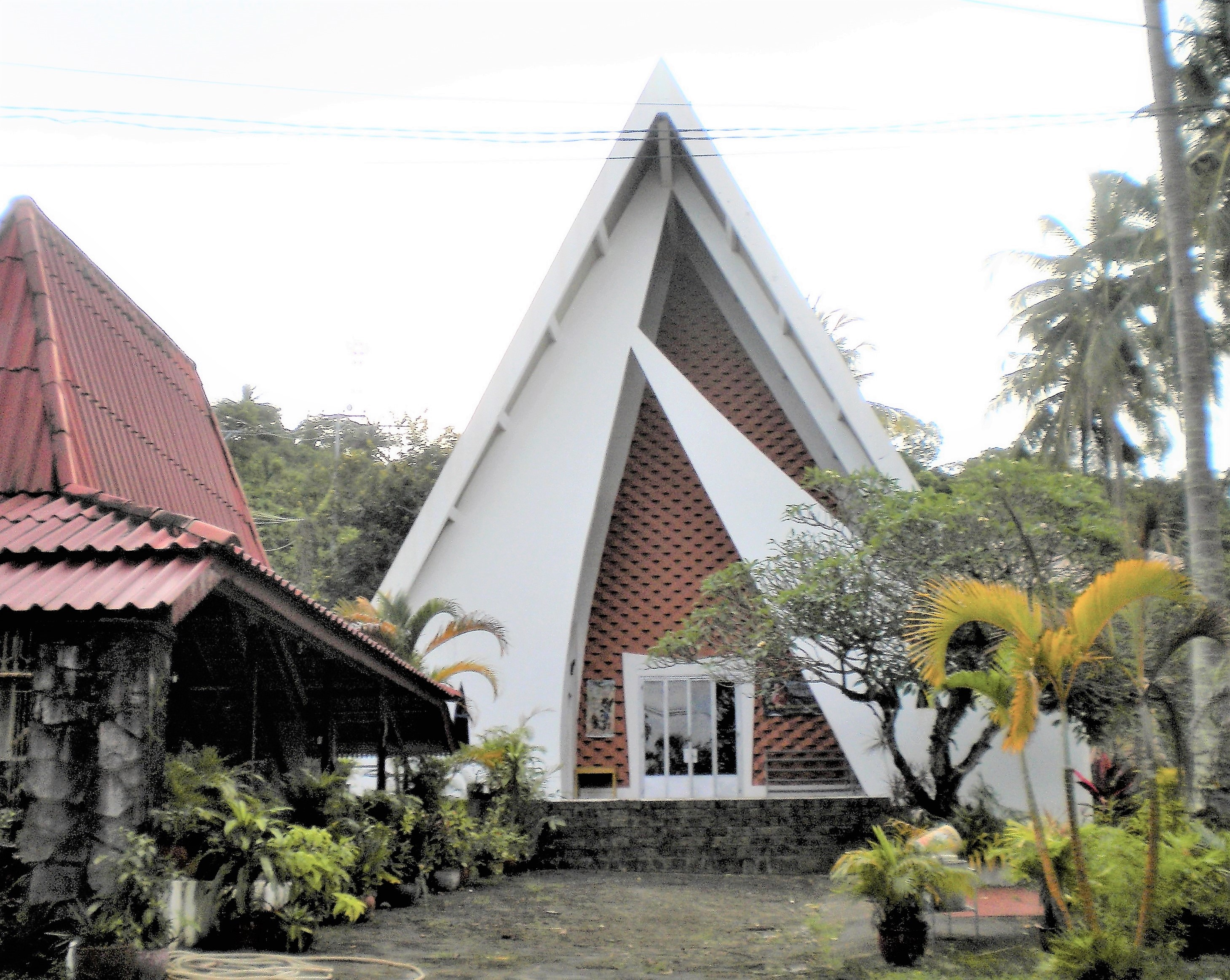
St. Michael Catholic Church

== Education ==
Public spending on education in Cambodia totaled 2.6% (of GDP) as of 2010. Cambodian general education is based on the national school curriculum that consists of:

Basic education

The basic education curriculum is divided into three cycles of three years each. The first cycle (grades 1–3) consists of 27–30 lessons per week lasting 40 minutes, which are allocated to five main subjects. The second cycle (grades 4–6) consists of the same number of lessons but is slightly different. The third cycle (grades 7–9) consists of 32–35 lessons, which are allocated to seven major subjects.

Upper secondary education

The upper secondary education curriculum consists of two different phases. The curriculum for the first phase (grade 10) is identical to the curriculum for the third cycle of primary education. The second phase (grades 11–12) has two main components: compulsory and electives.

The adult literacy rate in Sihanoukville is 95.37%.

The city has experienced shortages of teachers but the situation has improved during the last decade. The 2004 statistics show the following centers of education: 33 pre-schools with 1,670 children, 52 primary schools with 34,863 students, five colleges with 4,794 students; two high schools with 1,449 students; 10 vocational training schools with 961 students; and 13,728 students in private schools.

Sihanoukville Educational Statistics 2004
Institution	Schools	Classes	Classrooms	Students	Teachers
Preschool	33			1670	
Primary school	52			34863	
College	5			4794	
Lycee	2			1449	
Vocational training	10			961	
Private schools	27			13,728	

Sihanoukville Educational Statistics 2014
Institution	Schools	Classes	Classrooms	Students	Teachers
Preschool	44	64	60	1715	72
Primary school	73	800	532	26212	778
Secondary school	27	260	269	11889	725
College	20	114	107	4577	318
Lycee	7	155	153	7312	407
Lycees with grade 10–12 only	1	31	31	1366	87

== International relations ==
Sihanoukville is twinned with:

- Miami, Florida, United States
- Seattle, Washington, United States
- Tampa, Florida, United States
