= Preah Sihanouk province =

Province of Cambodia

Preah Sihanouk Province ខេត្តព្រះសីហនុ
- Province

Khmer transcription(s)
  - Khmer: ខេត្តព្រះសីហនុ
  - UNGEGN: Khaet Preăh Seihănŭ
  - ALA-LC: Khett Braḥ Sīhanu
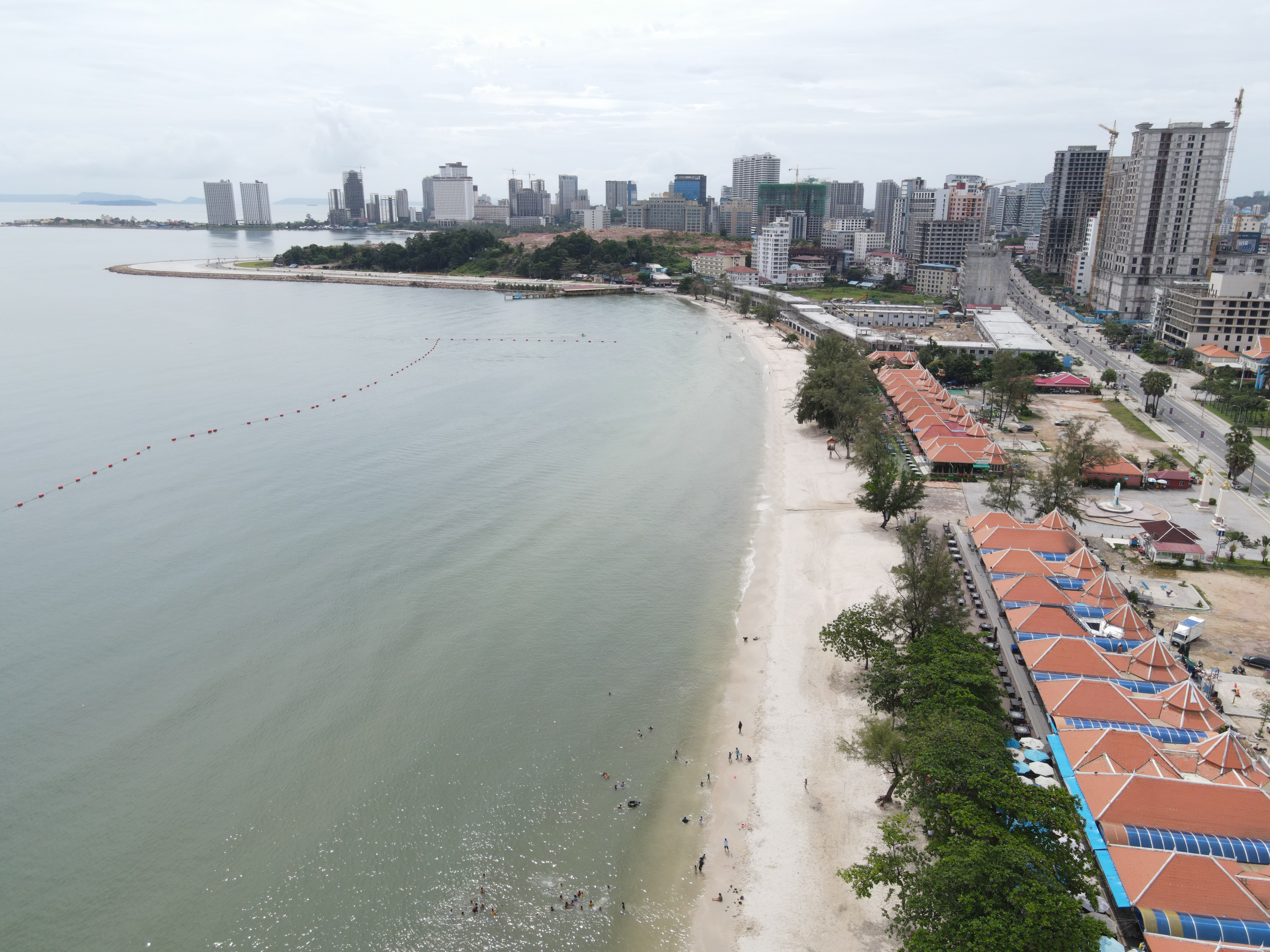
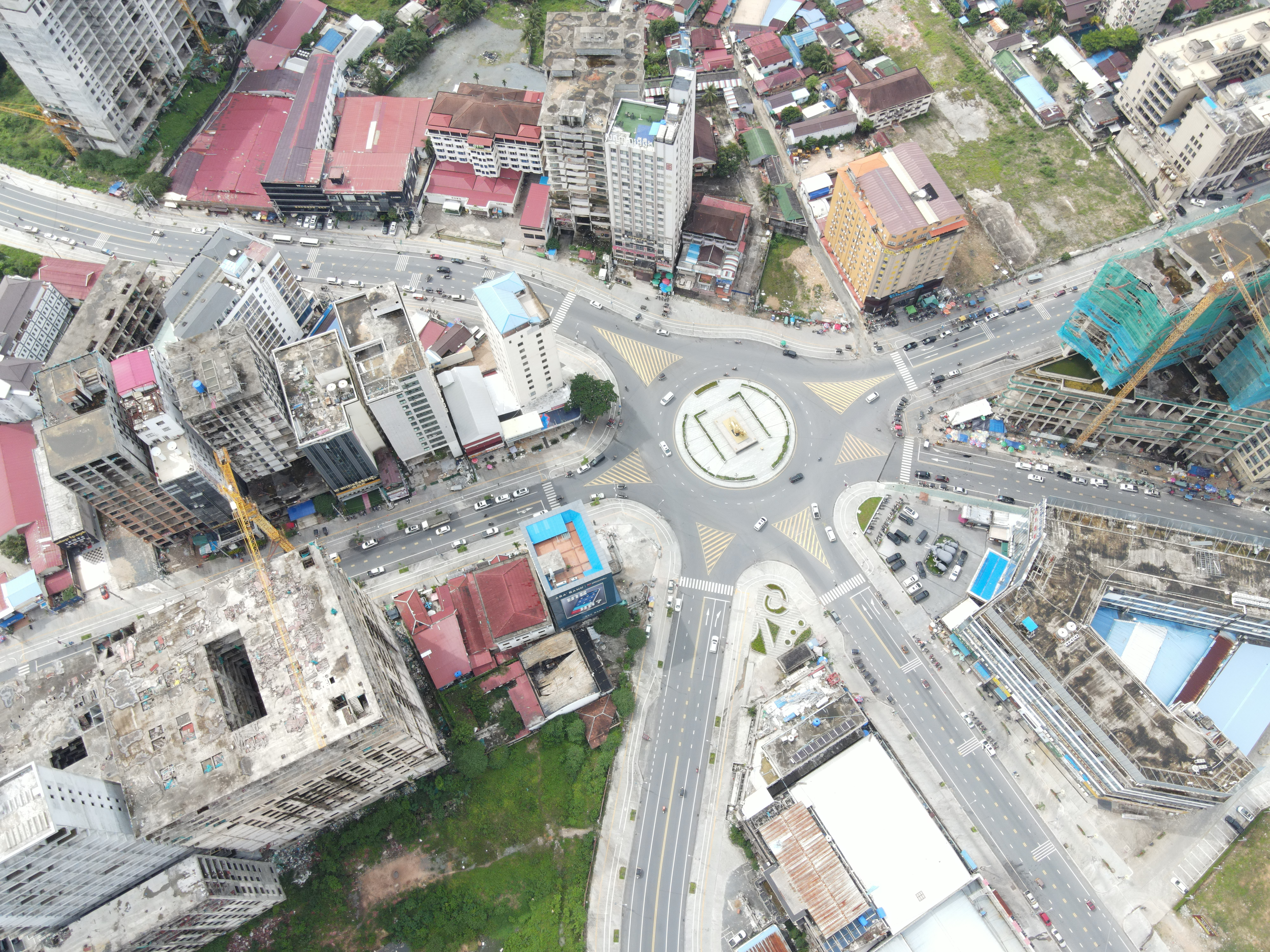
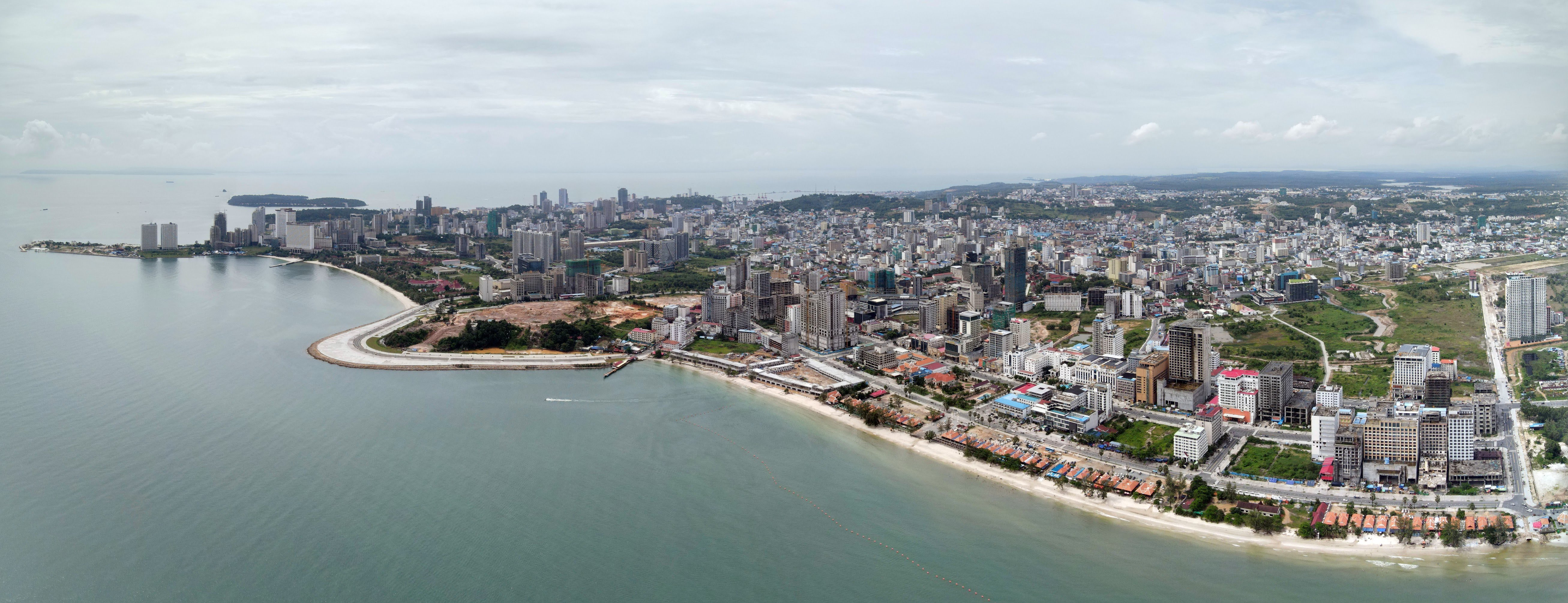
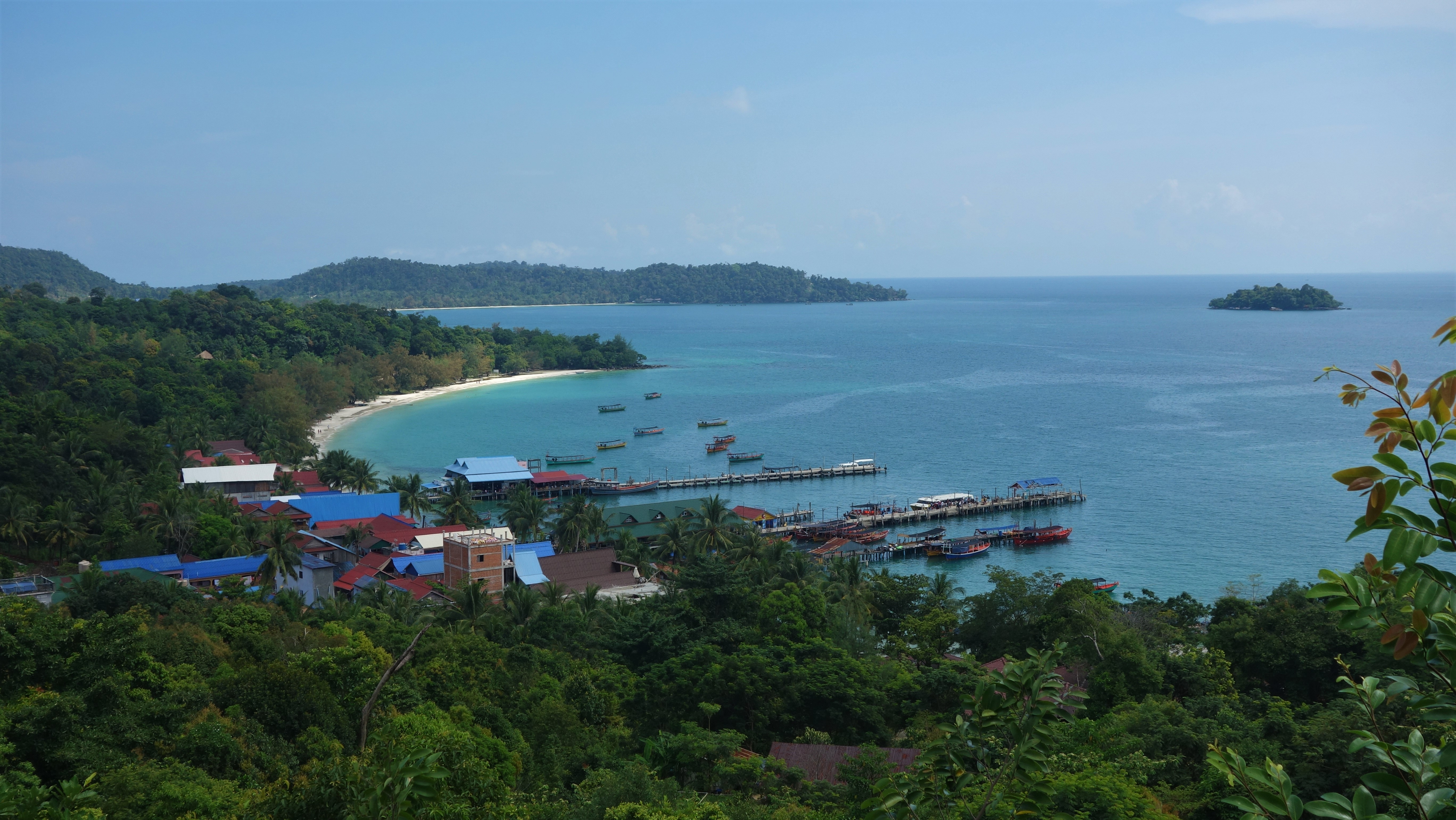
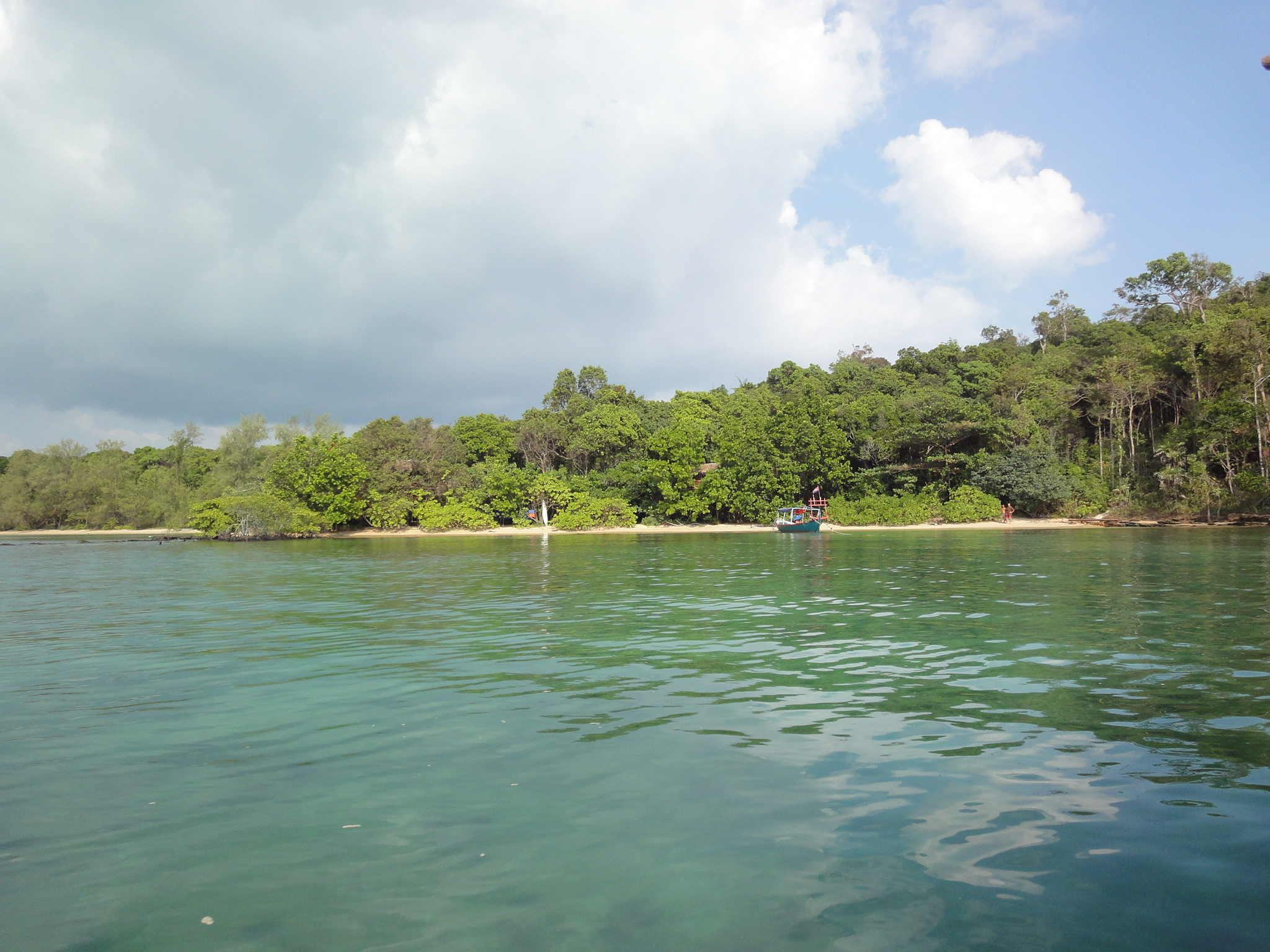
- Top, from left: Ochheuteal Beach, Two Lions Roundabout; Centre: Sihanoukville; Bottom, from left: Koh Rong and Koh Ta Kiev

- Seal

- Map of Cambodia highlighting Preah Sihanouk Province
- Coordinates: 10°37′24″N 103°31′30″E
- Country: Cambodia
- Established: 22 November 1957
- Provincial status: 22 December 2008
- Named for: Norodom Sihanouk
- Capital: Sihanoukville, Koh Rong (town) and Kampong Saom

Government
  - Governor: Mang Sineth (CPP)
  - National Assembly: 3 / 125

Area
  - Total: 1,938 km^{2} (748 sq mi)
  - Rank: 22nd
- Elevation: 316 m (1,037 ft)

Population (2024)
  - Total: ▼234,702
  - Rank: 20th
  - Density: 160/km^{2} (410/sq mi)
  - Rank: 7th
- Time zone: UTC+7 (ICT)
- Postcode: 18000
- Dialing code: 034
- ISO 3166 code: KH-18
- Districts: 4
- Communes: 26
- Villages: 108
- HDI (2019): 0.599 medium · 7th
- Website: sihanoukville.gov.kh

Preah Sihanouk (Khmer: ខេត្តព្រះសីហនុ, Khaet Preăh Seihănŭ, [preah səjhanuʔ]; lit. 'sacred Sihanouk') is a province (khaet) in southwest Cambodia on the Gulf of Thailand. The provincial capital, also called Sihanoukville, is a deep water port city and a steadily growing and diversifying urban center on an elevated peninsula.

First established as Kampong Som Province (Khmer: ខេត្តកំពង់សោម, Khaet Kǎmpǒng Saom, Khmer pronunciation: [kɑmpɔŋ saom]; lit. 'moon port'), the province was later renamed in honor of former King Norodom Sihanouk, who orchestrated the establishment of Sihanoukville city and the Sihanoukville municipality as this took place alongside the construction of the Sihanoukville Port, which commenced in June 1955. The only deep water port of Cambodia, it includes an oil terminal and a transport logistics facility.

Preah Sihanouk is divided into four districts, each with a distinct economic character, defined largely by location and access to resources. In addition to the port and the growing tourism industry, the activities of countless NGOs and international investment have contributed to the rapid economic growth of the province over the course of the last decade. Primary economic sectors are transport and logistics, process manufacturing, agriculture and fisheries, textiles, and real estate.

The islands and beaches of Preah Sihanouk Province are an international tourist destination as visitor numbers have risen steadily since the late-20th century.

Sihanoukville municipality was elevated to provincial status on 22 December 2008 after King Norodom Sihamoni signed a decree converting the municipalities of Kep, Pailin, and Sihanoukville into provinces, as well as incorporating Kompong Seila District. As one of Cambodia's agriculturally and industrially most diverse provinces, its economic future has a solid basis, although the essential sectors of agriculture and tourism require strict and permanent administrative protection of local natural resources.

== Etymology ==
The official name in Khmer is: Khaet ('province') Preah ('holy') Sihanouk (name of the former king), which translates to, 'province of the holy Sihanouk' or 'honorable Sihanouk province'. It honors the former king Norodom Sihanouk (reigned 1941–1955 and 1993–2004) who was and still is revered as the "father of the modern nation". Sihanouk himself suggested the official Western variant Sihanoukville. The name "Sihanouk" is derived from Sanskrit through two Pali words, sīha ('lion'), and hanu ('jaws').

The former name Kampong Som (also romanized as Kompong Som) (Khmer: កំពង់សោម) means 'Port of the Moon' or 'Shiva's Port'. Som is derived from the Sanskrit word saumya, the original (Rig Vedic) meaning of which was Somā, the 'juice or sacrifice of the moon-god', but evolved into Pali 'moon', 'moonlike' 'name of Shiva'. The word Kampong or Kompong is of Malayan origin and means 'village' or 'hamlet'. Its meaning underwent extension towards 'pier' or 'river landing bridge'.

== History ==
=== Classical period (before 1700) ===
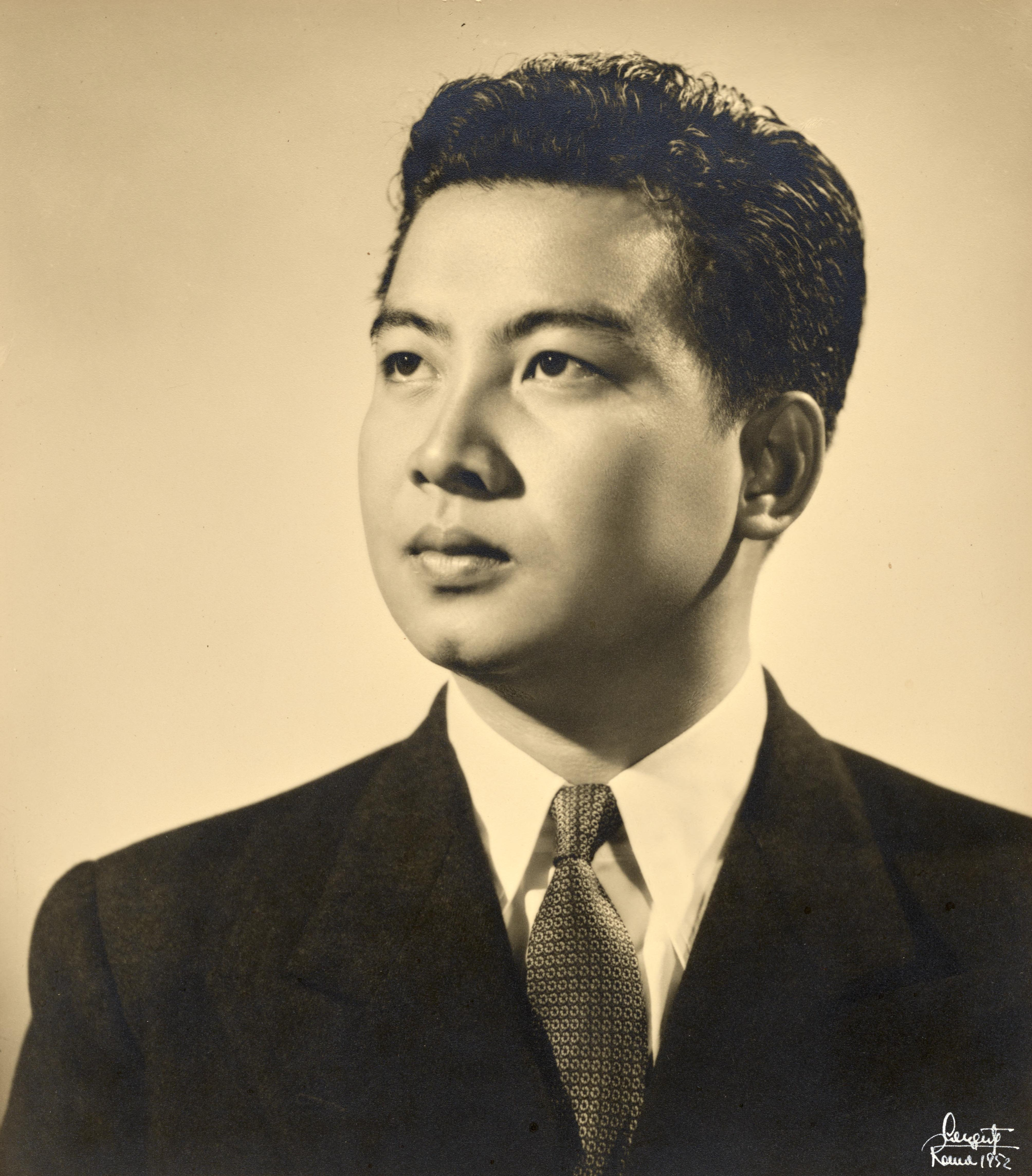
Founded as Kampong Som province, the province was renamed to Sihanoukville in 1959 after King Norodom Sihanouk

Prior to the city's creation in 1955, no recorded settlement on the peninsula existed that was larger than a traditional trading or fishing village. During the many centuries of pre-Angkorian and Angkorian history – from Funan to Chenla and during the Khmer Empire, regional trade was centered at O Keo (Vietnamese: Óc Eo) in the Mekong Delta, now the province of Rạch Giá in Vietnam. The township of Prei Nokor (Saigon) was a commercial center of the Khmer Empire.

The Chronicle of Samtec Cauva Vamn Juon – one of the 18th and 19th century Cambodian Royal Chronicles – briefly mentions the region as the country was split into three parts during a nine year civil war from 1476 to 1485: "In 1479, Dhammaraja took on the throne at Catumukh (Phnom Penh) and controlled the provinces of Samrong Tong, Thpong, Kompong Saom, Kampot up to the Bassak, Preah Trapeang, Kramuon Sar, Koh Slaket and Peam".

=== Early modern period (c. 1700–1863) ===
From the end of the 17th century, Cambodia lost control of the Mekong River as Vietnamese power expanded into the lower Mekong. During the Nguyen-Siamese War (1717–1718) a Siamese fleet burned the port of Kompong Som in 1717 but was defeated by the Vietnamese at Banteay Meas/Ha Tien. A Cambodian king of the late-18th century, Outey-Reachea III allied with a Chinese pirate, Mac-Thien-Tu, who had established an autonomous polity based in Ha Tien and controlled the maritime network in the eastern part of the Gulf of Thailand. Ha Tien was at a point where a river linking to the Bassac River flows into the Gulf of Thailand. Landlocked Cambodia tried to keep its access to maritime trade through Ha Tien. In 1757 Ha Tien acquired the ports of Kampot and Kompong Som as a reward for Mac's military support of the King of Cambodia. Until its destruction in 1771 the port developed into an independent duty-free entrepôt linked with several Chinese trading networks.

Alexander Hamilton, who traveled on the Gulf of Thailand in 1720, wrote that "Kompong Som and Banteay Meas (later Ha Tien) belonged to Cambodia, as Cochin-China was divided from Cambodia by a river (Bassac River) of three leagues broad." and "King Ang Duong constructed a road from his capital of Oudong to Kampot". Kampot remained the only international seaport of Cambodia. "The traveling time between Udong and Kampot was eight days by oxcart and four days by elephants." French Résident Adhemard Leclère wrote: "...Until the 1840s, the Vietnamese governed Kampot and Péam [Mekong Delta], but Kompong Som belonged to Cambodia. The Vietnamese constructed a road from Ha Tien to Svai village - on the border with Kompong-Som - via Kampot."

The British Empire followed a distinct policy by the 1850s, seeking to consolidate its influence. Eyewitness reports give rare insights, as Foreign Secretary Lord Palmerston's agent John Crawfurd reports: "Cambodia was...the Keystone of our policy in these countries, - the King of that ancient Kingdom is ready to throw himself under the protection of any European nation...The Vietnamese were interfering with the trade at Kampot, and this would be the basis of an approach..." Palmerston concluded: "The trade at Kampot - one of the few remaining ports, could never be considerable, in consequence of the main entrance to the country, the Mekong, with all its feeders flowing into the Sea through the territory of Cochin China The country, too, had been devastated by recent Siam - Vietnam wars. Thus, without the aid of Great Britain, Kampot or any other port in Cambodia, can never become a commercial Emporium." Crawfurd later wrote: "The Cambodians... sought to use intervals of peace in the Siam - Vietnam wars to develop intercourse with outside nations. The trade at Kampot which they sought to foster was imperiled by pirates. Here is a point where the wedge might be inserted, that would open the interior of the Indo-Chinese Peninsula to British Commerce, as the great River of the Cambodians traverses its entire length and even affords communication into the heart of Siam".

=== French rule (1863–1954) ===
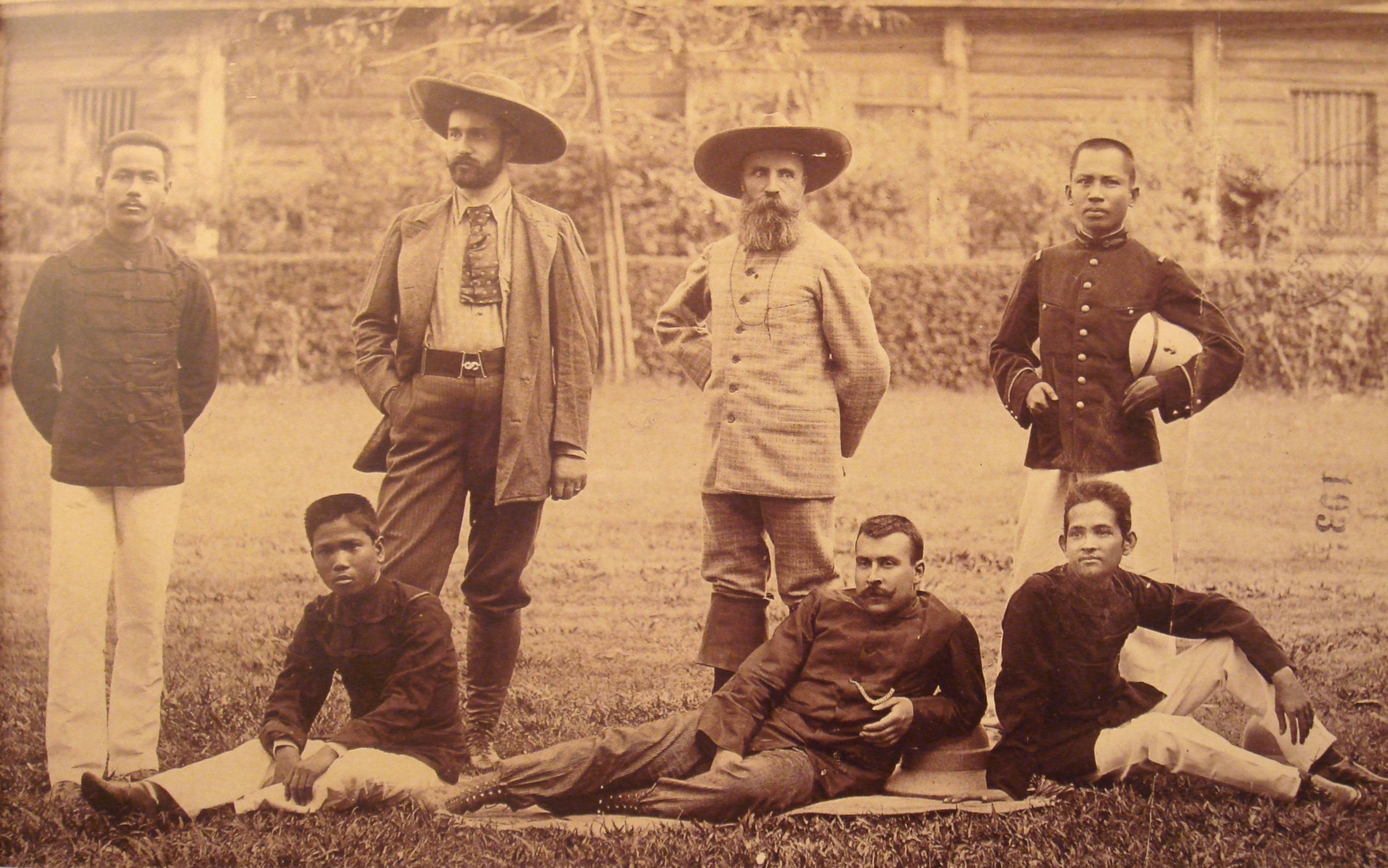
French civil servant Auguste Pavie (center) and Pierre Lefèvre-Pontalis in 1893 with Cambodian interpreters

Under French rule Vietnam, Laos, and Cambodia became a single administrative and economic unit. The coastal region Circonscription Résidentielle with Kampot as its capital contained the arrondissements of Kampot, Kompong Som, Trang, and Kong-Pisey. The establishment of another international trading center near the existing city of Saigon was not considered necessary. Focus remained the Mekong, and the idea to establish an alternative route to Chinese and Thai internal markets along an uninterrupted navigable waterway from the Red River to the Mekong Delta.

==== Insurrection ====
An insurrection that took place from 1885 to 1887 further discouraged French ambition. It started in Kampot and quickly spread to Veal Rinh, Kampong Seila, and Kompong Som, where the insurgents were led by a Chinese pirate named Quan-Khiem. He managed to control the northern part of Preah Sihanouk for some time until he - an old man - was arrested by Preah Sihanouk's governor.

The most notable infrastructural improvements of this period were the construction of Route Coloniale No. 17, later renamed National Road No. 3 and the national railway system, although work on the "Southern Line" – from Phnom Penh to Sihanoukville – only began in 1960.

=== After independence (since 1954) ===
The province's alternative name Kompong Saom (Kampong Som) was adopted from the local indigenous community. After the dissolution of French Indochina in 1954, it became apparent that the steadily tightening control of the Mekong Delta by Vietnam required a solution to gain unrestricted access to the seas. Plans were made to construct an entirely new deep water port. Kompong Saom was selected for water depth and ease of access. In August 1955, a French/Cambodian construction team cut a base camp into the unoccupied jungle in the area that is now known as Hawaii Beach. Funds for construction of the port came from France and the road was financed by the United States.

During the Vietnam War the port became a military facility for both sides, in the service of National Front for the Liberation of South Vietnam and after 1970, under the government of Lon Nol, in the service of the United States.

The port was the last place to be evacuated by the US Army, only days before Khmer Rouge guerrillas took control of the government in April 1975. The events surrounding the taking of the US container ship SS Mayaguez and its crew on 12 May 1975 by the Khmer Rouge and the subsequent rescue operation by US Marines played out on the waters of Koh Tang off the coast of Sihanoukville. During the two days of action, the US struck at targets on mainland Sihanoukville including the port, the Ream Naval Base, an airfield, the railroad yard, and the petroleum refinery in addition to strikes and naval gun fire on several islands.

In 1993, Ream National Park was established by a royal decree of former King Sihanouk.

Sihanoukville Municipality was elevated to provincial status on 22 December 2008 after King Norodom Sihamoni signed a decree converting the municipalities of Kep, Pailin, and Sihanoukville into provinces.

On 26 May 2011 the Preah Sihanouk area joined the Paris-based club Les Plus Belles Baies Du Monde ('The most Beautiful Bays in the World'). The organisation officially accepts the Bay of Cambodia as one of its members at the 7th General Assembly.

=== Chinese investment ===
From 2013 to 2017, China has invested about US$1 billion annually in Cambodia, making it the largest foreign direct investor. A significant share of that investment has been directed to Sihanoukville province. Chinese investments there are concentrated in a few key sectors such as casinos, real estate, resorts, and a deep-water port. Casinos are being built at such a fast pace that there is no agreement on how many there are: estimates range from 30 to 150. Rising in concert with Chinese-owned buildings is the Chinese population of the province. Channel News Asia in late-2018 estimated that there were 78,000 Chinese residents and 120,000 Chinese visitors in Sihanoukville. The Cambodian population of the province is 150,000. The media—both national and international—have taken to calling Sihanoukville "China Town" or "Macau 2".

== Geography ==
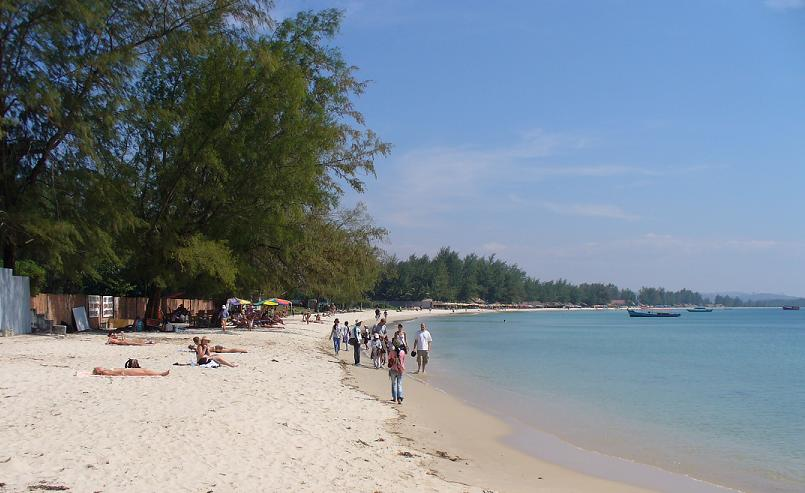
Tourists at Serendipity Beach

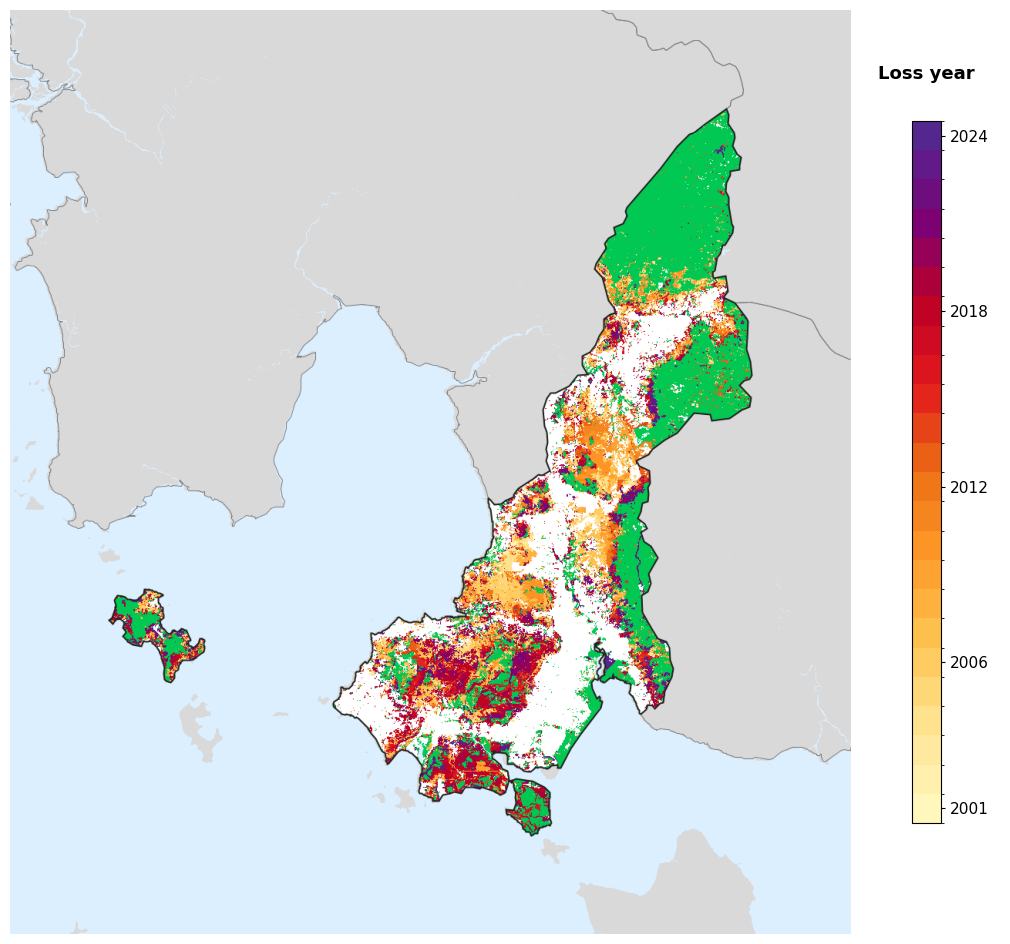
Tree-cover loss year in Preah Sihanouk, 2001-2024, from the Global Forest Change dataset.

Preah Sihanouk Province is on the coast of the Gulf of Thailand in southern Cambodia, occupying an area of 2536 km^{2} that includes the foothills of the Elephant Mountains and a sizable peninsula. Moderately developed beaches, a national park and a number of islands in proximity are natural assets that attract national and foreign visitors. A small group of islands dot the near coast due south and west. Preah Sihanouk Province borders Koh Kong and Kampong Speu province to the north and west, Kampot province to the east, and the Gulf of Thailand to the south.

The peninsula is separated from the central plains of Cambodia by the Elephant Mountains. The province incorporates Ream National Park, 210 km^{2}, that includes the islands of Koh Thmei and Koh Seh.

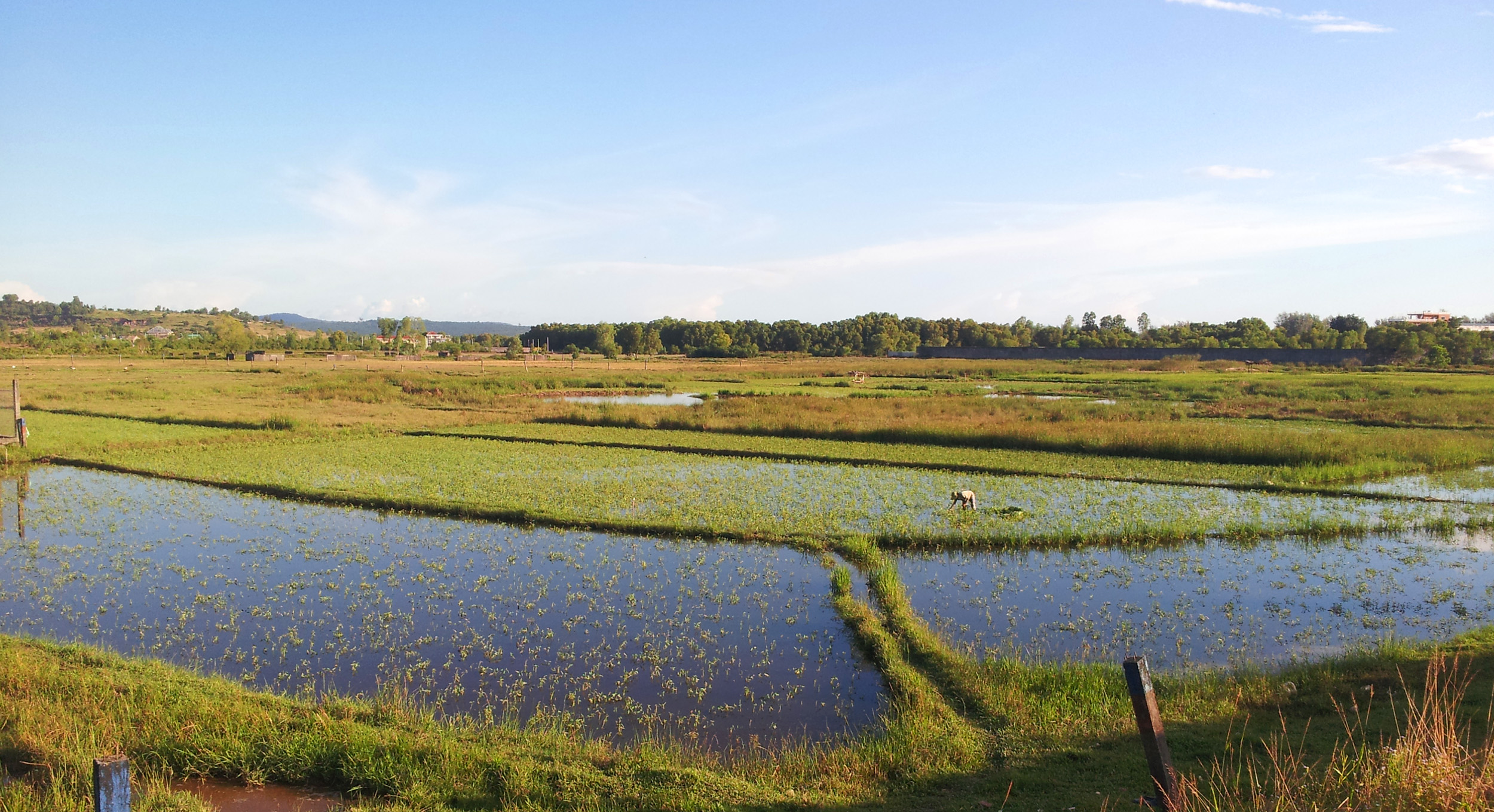
Coastal plains between Sihanoukville and Ream

Being a comparatively small province, Preah Sihanouk Province has only two urban centers: Sihanoukville city itself and Veal Rinh in the Prey Nob District, 46 kilometers north of Sihanoukville town. Prey Nob District in the east is predominantly rural and agricultural. Stung Hauv District in the northwest, only half the size of Prey Nob, has the largest fisheries sector of the province. Kampong Seila District in the north is still in the process of incorporation. Mittakpheap District in the south about the size of Stung Hauv, including the islands of Sangkat Koh Rong is one of the most advanced settlement centers of Cambodia with a developed and versatile industry, a large pool of skilled work force and a high human development index.

The province is connected to Phnom Penh by National Highway No. 4, to Kampot province by National Highway No. 3, and to Koh Kong province by National Highway No. 48. National Highway No. 4 is the southern end of Asian Highway 11, which is a section of the Asian Highway Network.

Sihanoukville town: The town's layout reflects little urban planning. Neighborhoods accumulate around the major road Ekreach (English, 'independence').

=== Beaches ===
Sihanoukville's beaches are one of the province's most valuable economic resources with varying degrees of commercial exploitation. The beaches listed below do not include any of the island's beaches.

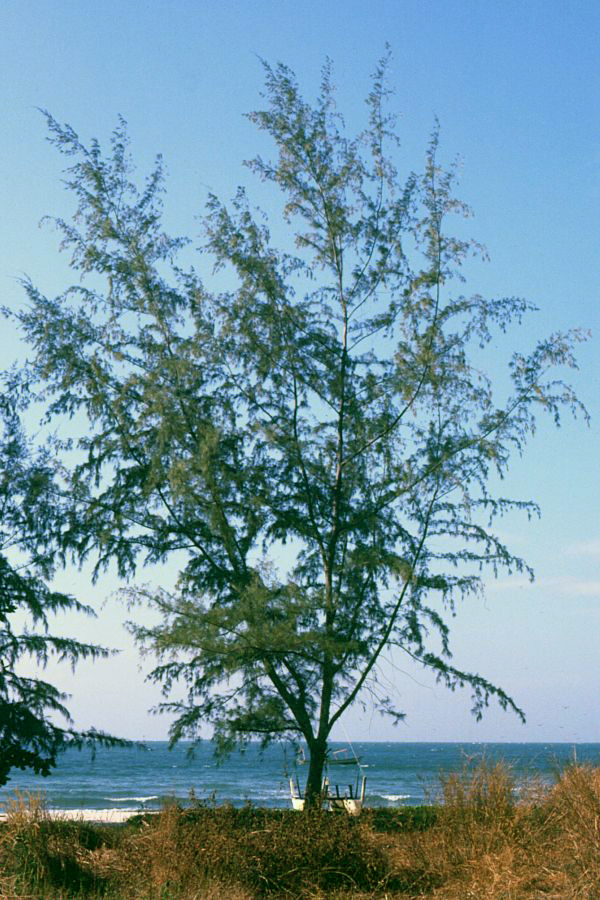
Casuarina tree

- Ochheuteal Beach : Ochheuteal Beach is a 3.3 km long strip of white sand beach lined with casuarina and tamarisk trees, grass umbrellas, rental chairs and around 30 standardized beach huts which serve meals and drinks, some serve also as night-time party spot. Well established middle class hotels and high-profile residences flank the beach along its Northern part. The sustainability of Ochheuteal Beach was a primary consideration of various stakeholders, which brought about the development of a tourism development and management plan in 2005. The southern half remains - apart from some hotels at its far end - essentially undeveloped.
- Serendipity Beach: Technically the western end (roughly one fifth or 600 m) of Ochheuteal beach, is very popular with Western tourists and has a few small guesthouses on the beach. It has been named by an American fellow, who came here in the 1990s. Struck by its (then) unspoiled beauty and pristine condition, he came up with the term, which quickly entered common vocabulary.
- Otres Beach: is around 4.6 km long and beyond the small "Queen Hill" headland at the southern end of Ochheuteal Beach. Its long white sand strip, also completely lined with casuarina and tamarisk trees, is far less developed and commercialized than Ochheuteal Beach and has developed into a preferred lodging place for Western visitors. From 2004 to 2011 this beach was occupied by numerous bungalows and dormitories, run by Western people. Due to the element of illegality of on-beach accommodation, among other reasons, police cleaned up the area in May 2011, removing the greater part of the beach-side bungalows. Permanent structures beyond the beach road supplement the remaining places since 2012. It is a very popular, well established holiday retreat – where prices have risen considerably over the course of the last years.
- Sokha Beach: Sokha Beach is around 1.2 km long and is west of Serendipity Beach. The beach is privately owned by, and its southern half occupied by, the Sokha Beach Hotel, the first luxury beach hotel in Cambodia. While the beach is well kept and many facilities are provided, visitors have to pay for their use and beach vendors are not allowed.
- Independence Beach: Independence Beach is around 1.3 km long and is northwest of Sokha Beach. The beach is named after the Independence Hotel, towering on top of a rock at its northern end.
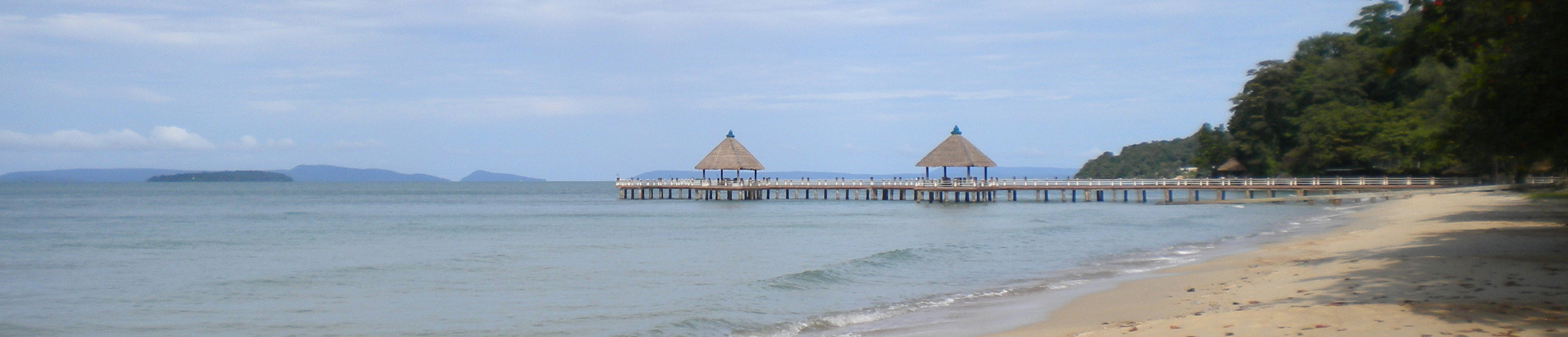
Independence Beach panoramic view with recently built jetty, October 2014
- Victory Beach: Victory beach is around 300 m long and is at the furthest north of the peninsula of Sihanoukville. It was heavily used by backpackers and is still popular with budget travelers. The deep water port is at the northern end of the beach. A consortium of Russian business people undertook large scale development here. The beach is regularly maintained.
- Lamherkay/Hawaii Beach: is the southern succession of Victory Beach, north of Independence Beach. It is a strip of similar length as Victory Beach - around 300 m. Here is the very place where the French/Cambodian construction team's groundwork began for the construction of the Sihanoukville Autonomous Port in 1955.
- Treasure Island Beach south of Lamherkay/Hawaii Beach is less than 50 m long and its entire length is fringed with concrete steps and wooden pavilions of a big Cambodian seafood restaurant.
- Hun Sen (Prek Treng) Beach: is the northernmost beach of the city with a length of around 1.5 km, behind the local port and essentially empty without beach huts and bars, it sees only weekend - and holiday visitors. The water is very shallow, but the area is lacking favorable infrastructure and is not regularly cleaned.
- Ream Beach: is south of Otres Beach, with an overall length of around 7.7 km, it consists of several sections with occasional stretches of rocks and vegetation. Koh Ta Kiev lies just 800 m off its southern end.
- Beaches inside the national park : At Ream National Park's southern coast exist several unnamed beaches with an approximate length of 10 km.
- Beaches of Steung Hav District : Beyond Sihanoukville's oil port lie two sizable beaches inside the Komong Saom Bay, in Prey Nob District.

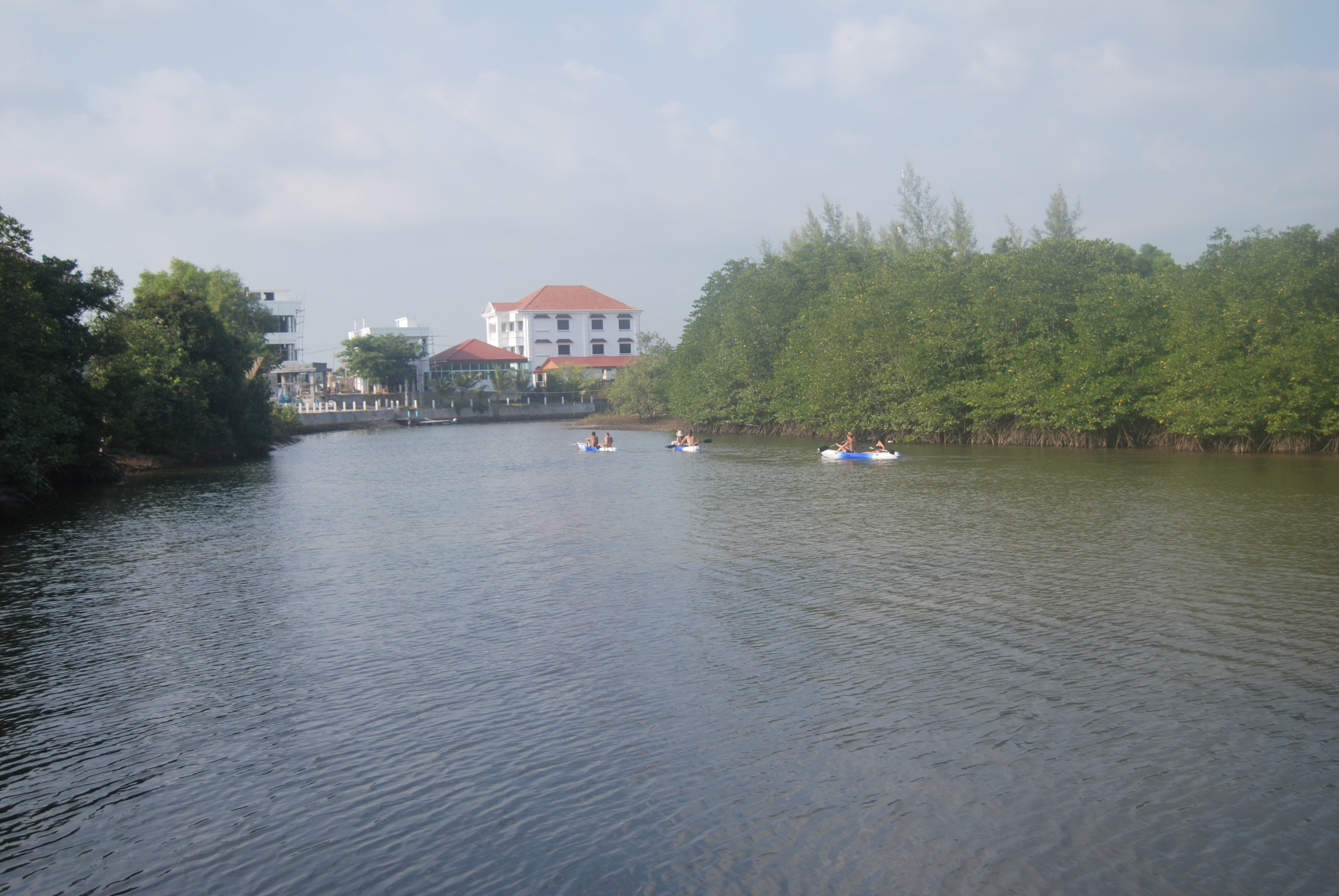
Ou Trojat Jet River kayaking

=== Rivers ===
The mangrove lined Ou Trojak Jet river runs from Otres pagoda to Otres beach is the city's longest river popular with both canoeists and anglers, the lower section harbours a marina. Restaurants along the south bank of the river serve fresh seafood supplied by the local inshore fishing boats.

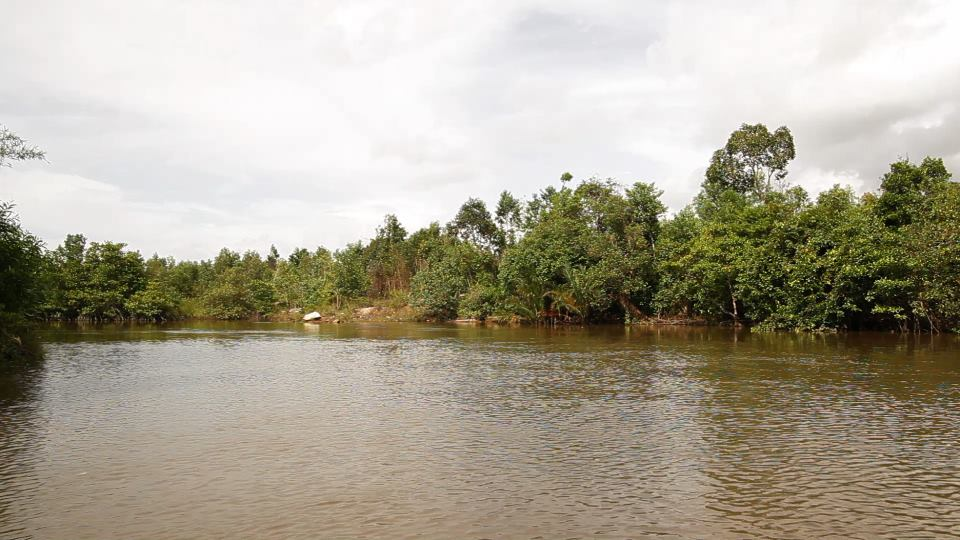
Ou Trojat Jet River

=== Islands ===
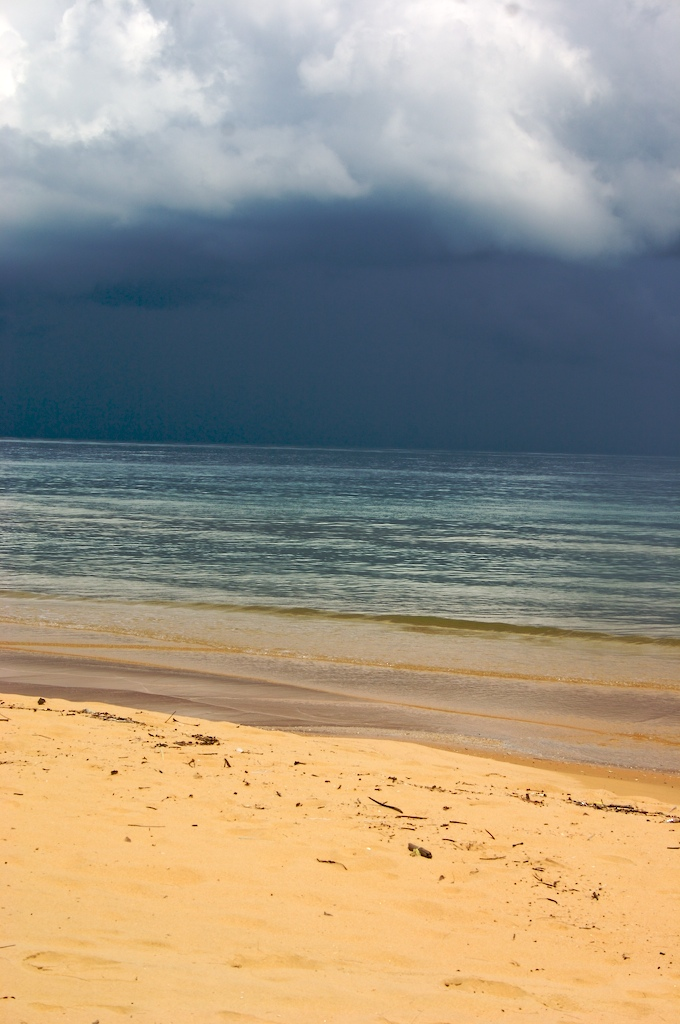
Clear shoreline of Bamboo Island

Twenty-two islands are administered by Preah Sihanouk Province. An increasing number are being developed for tourism. Koh Rong and Koh Rong Sanloem in particular have so far undergone years of unplanned development with many guesthouses and resorts.

- Koh Russei, កោះបស្សី: Also known as Bamboo Island. This medium-sized island is a few kilometers out from Otres Beach or Ream. There is a small naval base and is being "developed".
- Koh Rong, កោះរ៉ុង: Twenty-six kilometres west of the Sihanoukville. Koh Rong is the largest of the islands. It encompasses an area of 78 km^{2}. The terrain is predominantly hilly with a sizable mountain at the island's southwest. The hills provide water for creeks, lagoons and estuaries. The island's interior is almost completely forested. Although there are already many guest houses and pubs in and around Koh Tuich village, the island remains virtually deserted – its sheer size dwarfs all settlements. As of 2016, there is a well-functioning ferry network between Sihanoukville and Koh Rong.
- Koh Rong Sanloem, កោះរុងសន្លឹម: South of Koh Rong with smaller beaches on the west and east coasts. South of Koh Rong, it resembles its bigger sister in shape and geography – although a bit thinner, it is covered in dense forest, generally more flat, and it has noticeably less landmass in relation to its coastline. The marine life around Koh Rong Sanloem is very diverse and offers many diving spots. As of 2016, there is a well-functioning ferry network between Sihanoukville and Koh Rong Sanloem.
- Koh Kaong Kang/Thass, កោះកោងកាង/ថាស: 'Mangrove Island', Ile des Paletuviers (old French name), Koh Kaong Kang/Thass – one of the inner islands – is popular with snorkelers. Koh Kaong Kang/Thass is very flat, hence freshwater is scarce - one of the reasons why nobody lives there permanently.
- Koh Koun, កោះកូន: 'Child Island', Ile de Cone (old French name), a small island between Koh Rong and Koh Rong Sanloem, has no beach, is uninhabited, but a popular dive - and snorkel spot.
- Koh Tuich, កោះតូច: Small island, a tiny island off Koh Rong's Koh Tuich village. There is a little pagoda on it in service since around 2010. Shallow waters provide good snorkeling spots around the whole island.

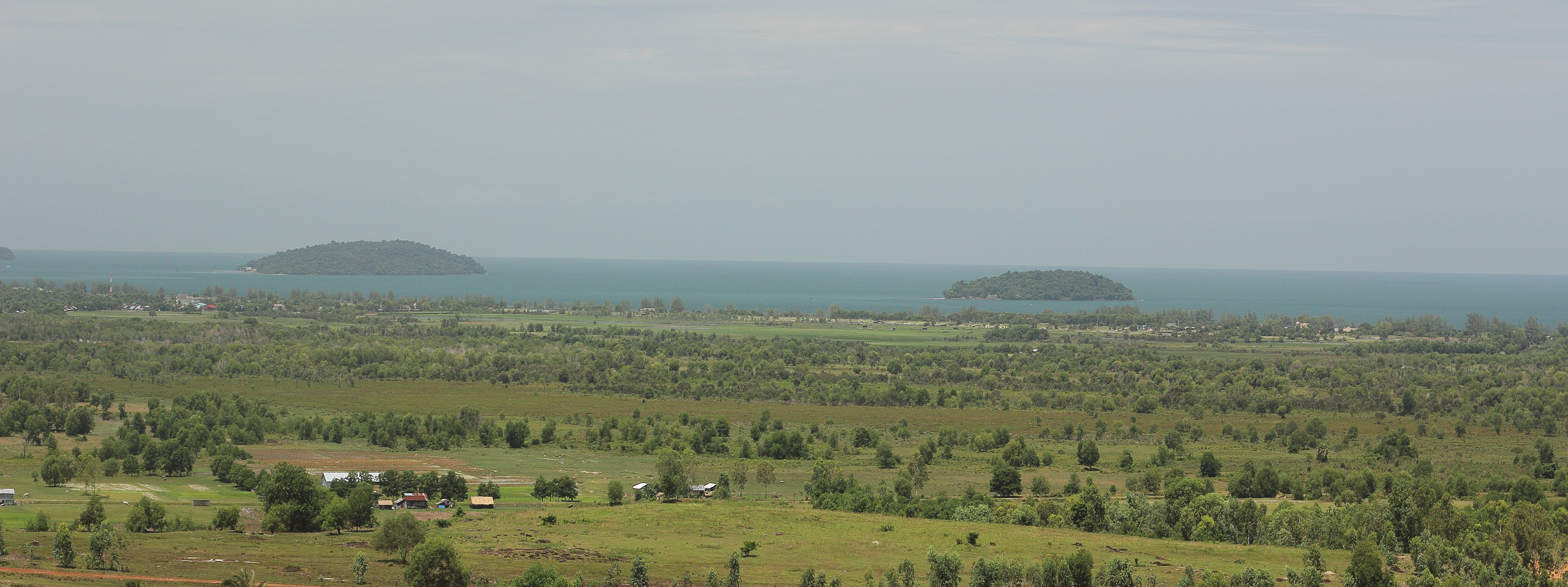
Kaoh Tres and Kaoh Chanlohl

- Koh Pos, កោះពស់: also known as Morokot Island or Snake Island. This island lies 800 metres (2,625 ft) off Victory Beach. It is under development by Russian investors and being converted into a luxury holiday destination and high standard residential area. Snake Island was linked to the mainland with a regular road traffic bridge since around July 2011. The bridge is not currently open for public traffic.
- Koh Dek Koul, កោះដេកកោល: This small island lies 7 kilometres (4 mi) off Victory Beach and only a further few hundred meters off Snake Island. The Russian Mirax Luxury Resort corporation operates a hotel business on this predominantly rocky island.
- Koh Bong Po-oun/Song Saa, កោះបងកោះប្អូន: – Siblings/Lovers Islands – Les Frères (old French name), renamed Koh Song Saa – 'Lovers islands' – two tiny islets off Koh Rong's northeast, it is home of the Song Saa Resort.
- Koh Tres/Kteah, កោះខ្ទះ: 'Pan Island', Ile Ronde (old French name), off Otres beach and easy to reach (15 min by Kayak) and has got a “beach” of around 10 m^{2} in size, which is submerged during high tide. Only one Cambodian family (officials) lives there.
- Koh Preus,កោះប្រឺស, 'Deer Island' – Ile Nord-Ouest (old French name)
- Koh Thmei,កោះថ្មី, 'New Island' – Ile du Milieu (old French name), immediately southeast of the Sihanoukville headland inside Ream National Park
- Koh Seh,កោះសេះ, 'Horse Island' – Ile a L’eau (old French name), 1.5 km (1 mi) south of Koh Thmei and around 9 km (6 mi) south of the mainland of Sihanoukville's Ream commune. Less than 400 meters southwest of Koh Seh lies the tiny islet of Koh Ky.
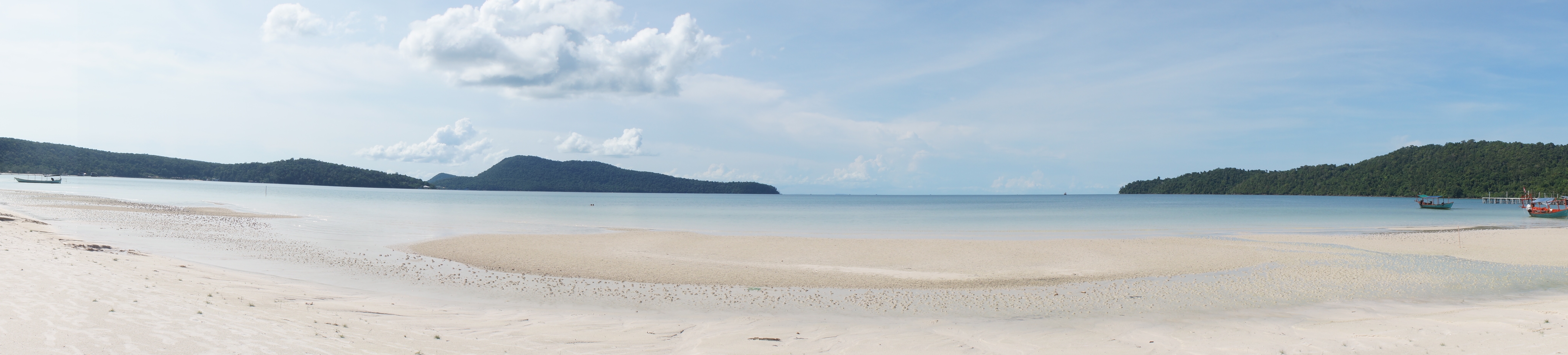
Koh Rong Sanloem Island, Saracen Bay Beach

== Climate ==
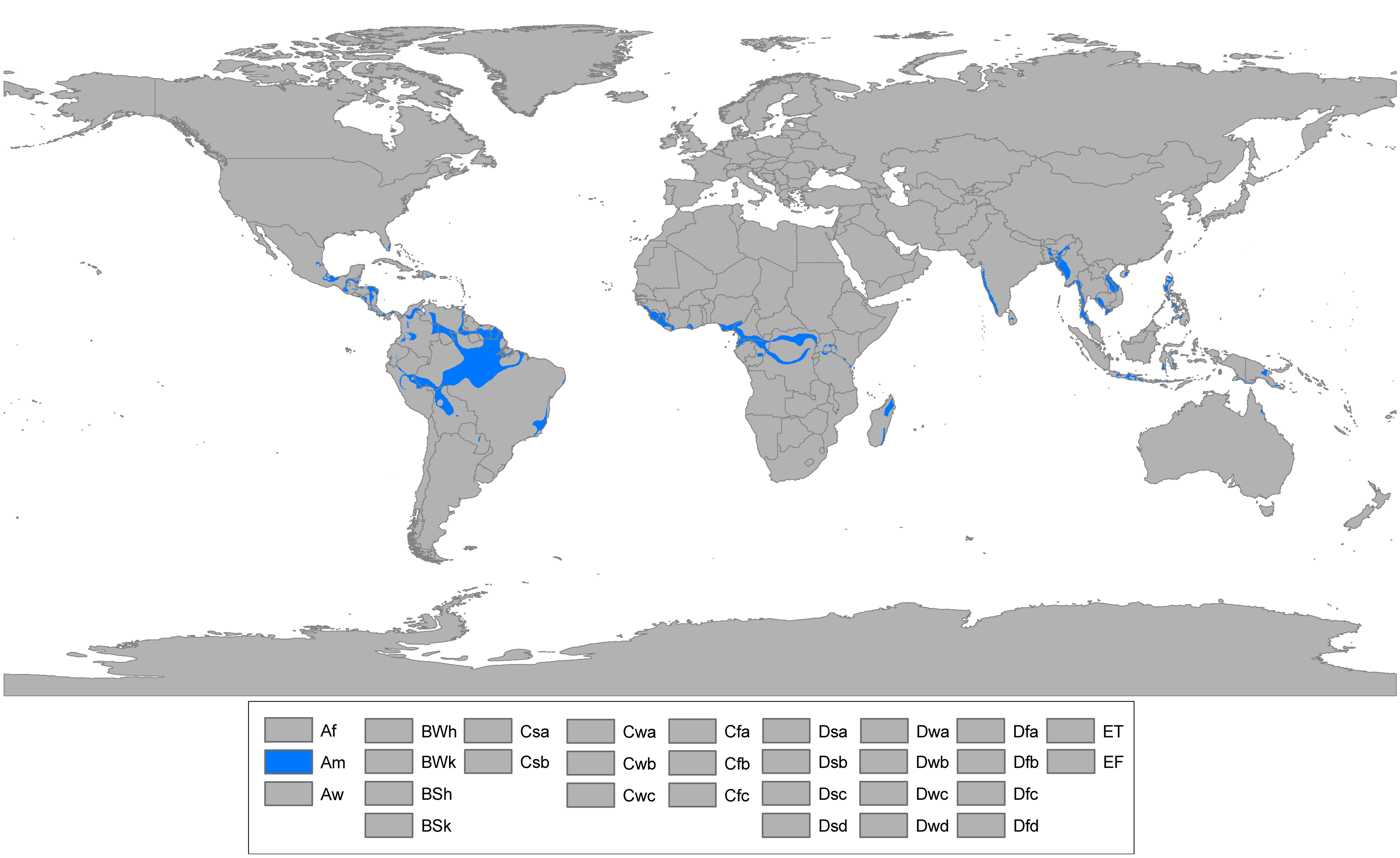
Worldwide zones of tropical monsoon climate (Am).

Sihanoukville lies in the tropical monsoon (Am) climate zone. It has two seasons: a wet season and a dry season. Monthly averages range from 14 °C (57.2 °F) in January to 36.0 °C (96.8 °F) in July.

The maximum mean is about 30 °C; the minimum mean, about 24 °C. Maximum temperatures of higher than 32 °C (89.6 °F), however, are common and, just before the start of the rainy season, they may rise to more than 38 °C (100.4 °F). Minimum temperatures rarely fall below 20 °C (50 °F). January is the coolest month, and April is the warmest. Tropical cyclones cause much less damage in Cambodia than they do in Vietnam.

The total annual rainfall average is between 1,000 and 1,500 millimeters (39.4 and 59.1 in). The heaviest amounts fall in August and September. The relative humidity is high at night throughout the year; usually it exceeds 90%. During the daytime in the dry season, humidity averages about 50% or slightly lower, but it may remain about 60% in the rainy period.

Climate data for Sihanoukville, Cambodia
Month	Jan	Feb	Mar	Apr	May	Jun	Jul	Aug	Sep	Oct	Nov	Dec	Year
Mean daily maximum °C (°F)	31.3 (88.3)	31.2 (88.2)	32.1 (89.8)	33.7 (92.7)	32.3 (90.1)	31.2 (88.2)	30.0 (86.0)	30.8 (87.4)	30.8 (87.4)	30.8 (87.4)	31.2 (88.2)	31.7 (89.1)	31.4 (88.6)
Mean daily minimum °C (°F)	23.9 (75.0)	24.6 (76.3)	25.4 (77.7)	25.0 (77.0)	26.8 (80.2)	26.3 (79.3)	25.9 (78.6)	25.1 (77.2)	25.2 (77.4)	24.7 (76.5)	24.4 (75.9)	23.5 (74.3)	25.1 (77.1)
Average precipitation mm (inches)	28.3 (1.11)	25.2 (0.99)	50.3 (1.98)	124.8 (4.91)	207.3 (8.16)	252.7 (9.95)	341.4 (13.44)	377.2 (14.85)	320.6 (12.62)	290.4 (11.43)	138.2 (5.44)	54.4 (2.14)	2,210.8 (87.02)
Source: world weather online

== Administration ==
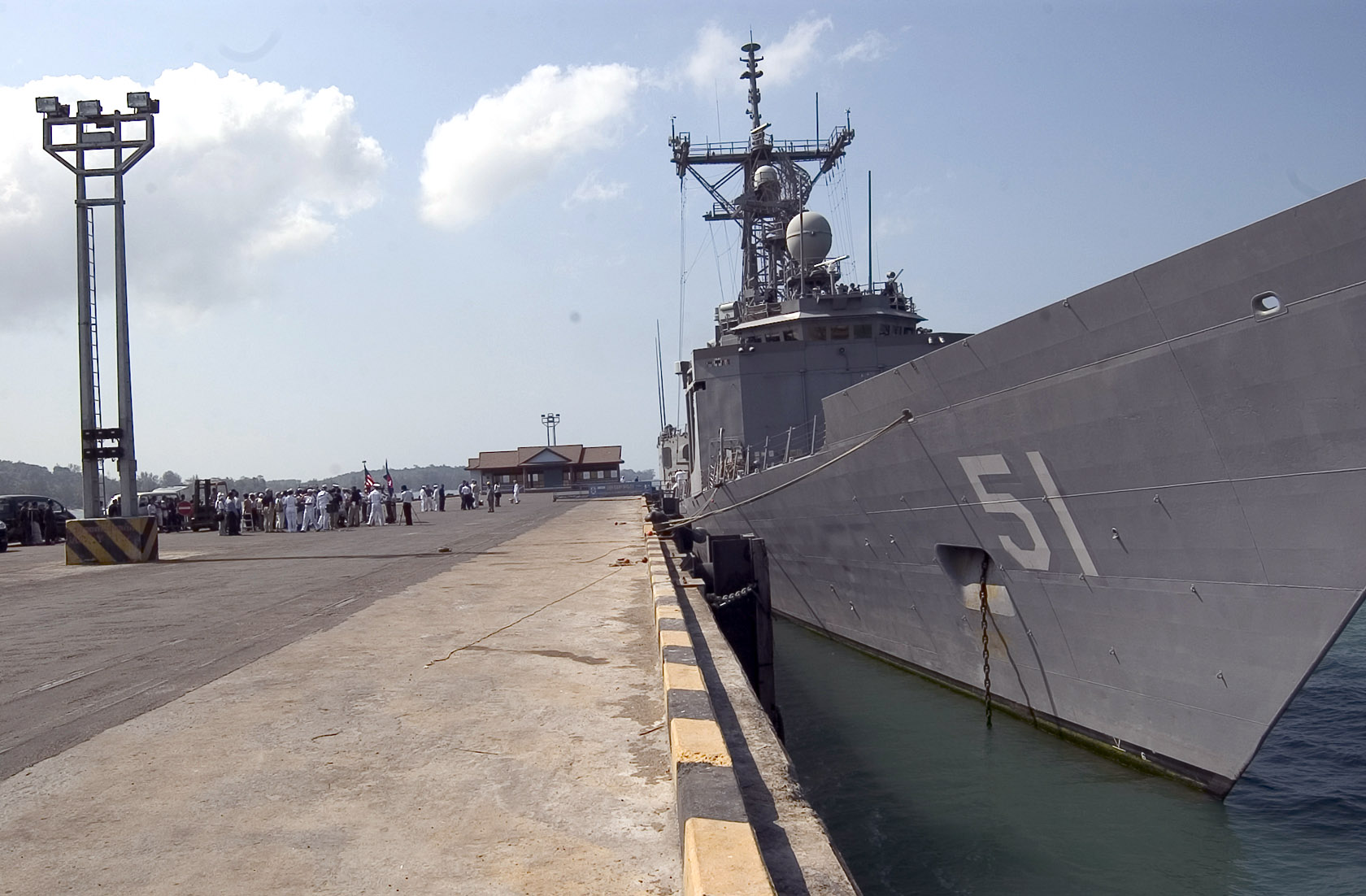
USS Gary docked at Sihanoukville Port

Sihanoukville used to be one municipality, holding the same status as a province. It was converted to a full province on 22 December 2008. There is a provincial governor and three deputy governors. It is divided into three districts and three municipalities. The port is autonomously administered. The districts and municipalities are divided into 29 communes and 111 villages.

Kampong Seila District, which belonged to Koh Kong province has, by royal decree, was transferred to Preah Sihanouk Province in January 2009: "The administrative boundaries of Preah Sihanouk municipality and Koh Kong province shall be adjusted by sub-dividing land from Kampong Seila district in whole and partial land of Sre Ambil district in Koh Kong province to Preah Sihanouk municipality." Officials were assigned to create a National Workshop - also in relation to other provinces - and process all necessary administrative tasks. The National Institute of Statistics of Cambodia refers in its most recent and preliminary studies to a successful integration of the district, including maps, although official statistics and numbers are expected to come with the next full report. Preah Sihanouk province's new official domain has incorporated Kompong Seila District.

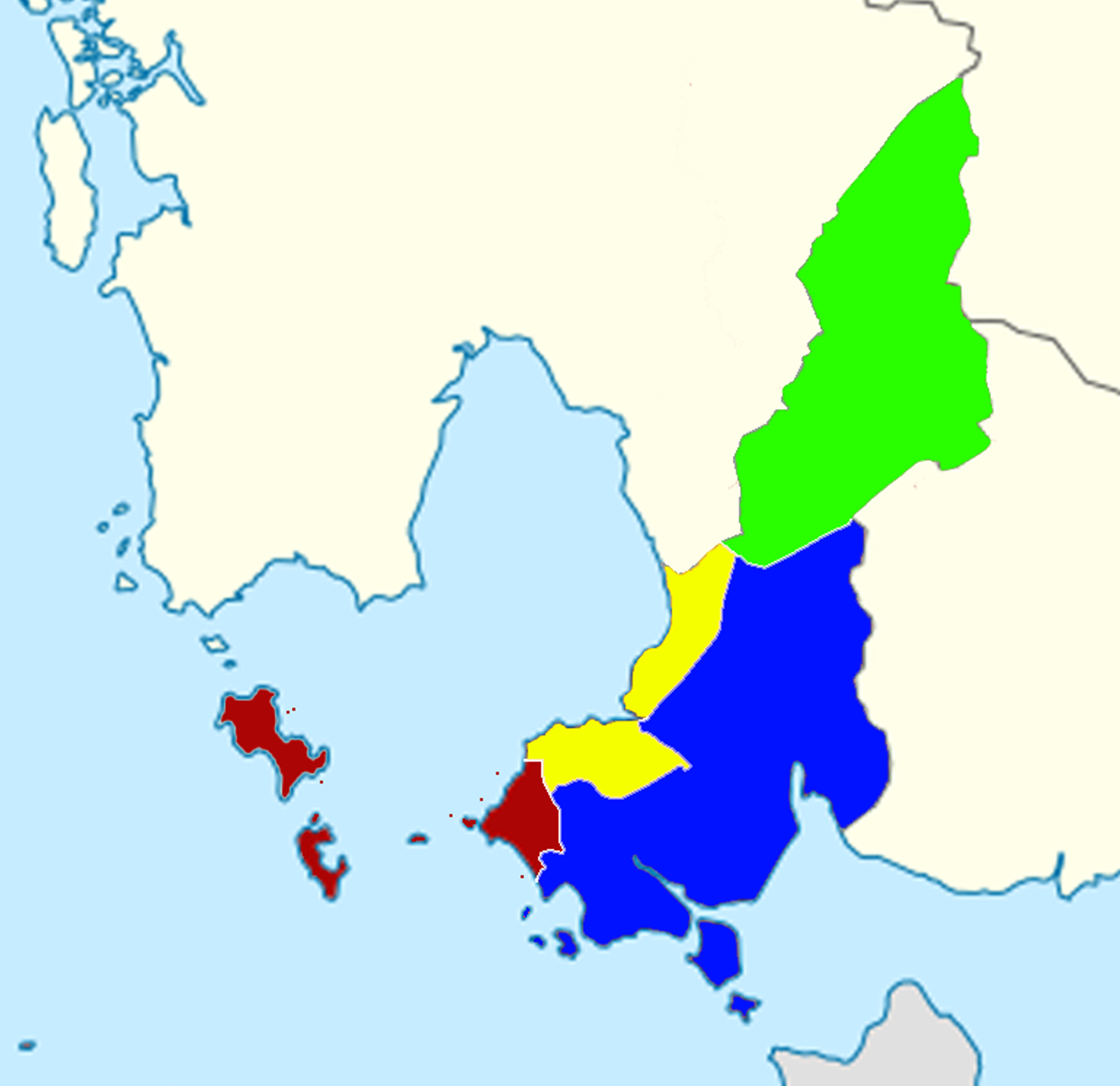
Sihanoukville Province districts: Mittakpheap (dark red), Stueng Hav (yellow), Prey Nob (blue), Kampong Seila (green)

ISO code	District	Khmer	Population	Communes	Villages
1801	Sihanoukville Municipality (formerly Mittapheap District)	ក្រុងព្រះសីហនុ (អតីត ស្រុកមិត្តភាព	67,440	5	19
1802	Prey Nob	ព្រៃនប់	75,142	14	65
1803	Stueng Hav	ស្ទឹងហាវ	13,108	3	10
1804	Kampong Seila	កំពង់សីលា	14,965	4	14
1805	Koh Rong City	ក្រុងកោះរ៉ុង		2	4
1806	Kampong Soam City	ក្រុងកំពង់សោម		5	23

== Economy ==
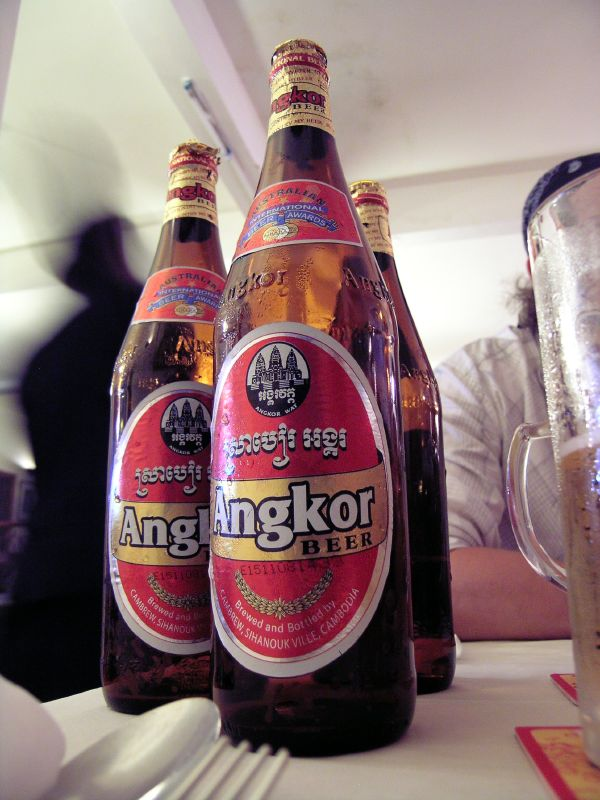
Angkor Beer

The economy of Sihanoukville province is varied but to a great part defined by its international port and the nearby oil port with numerous import-export companies settled in the area and the attached freight-transport sector with the local cargo storage facilities. Other sizable economic sectors of the province are fisheries, aquaculture, agriculture, mining, frozen shrimp processing, the garment industry, the real estate market, and tourism. Sihanoukville is the home of Angkor Beer, one of Cambodia's major breweries.

About US$1 billion was invested in the province by the Chinese between 2016–2018. As of 2019. There are around 50 Chinese-owned casinos in the province, and dozens of new hotels are under construction, all aimed at the influx of Chinese tourists.

Businesses ranked by persons employed (province)
Size of establishment	Number of establishments
1-10 persons	10,424
11-50 persons	177
51-100 persons	19
101 or more	29
Total	10.649
Source: Cambodiainvestment - Preah-Sihanouk-Province

=== Sihanoukville Special Economic Zone ===
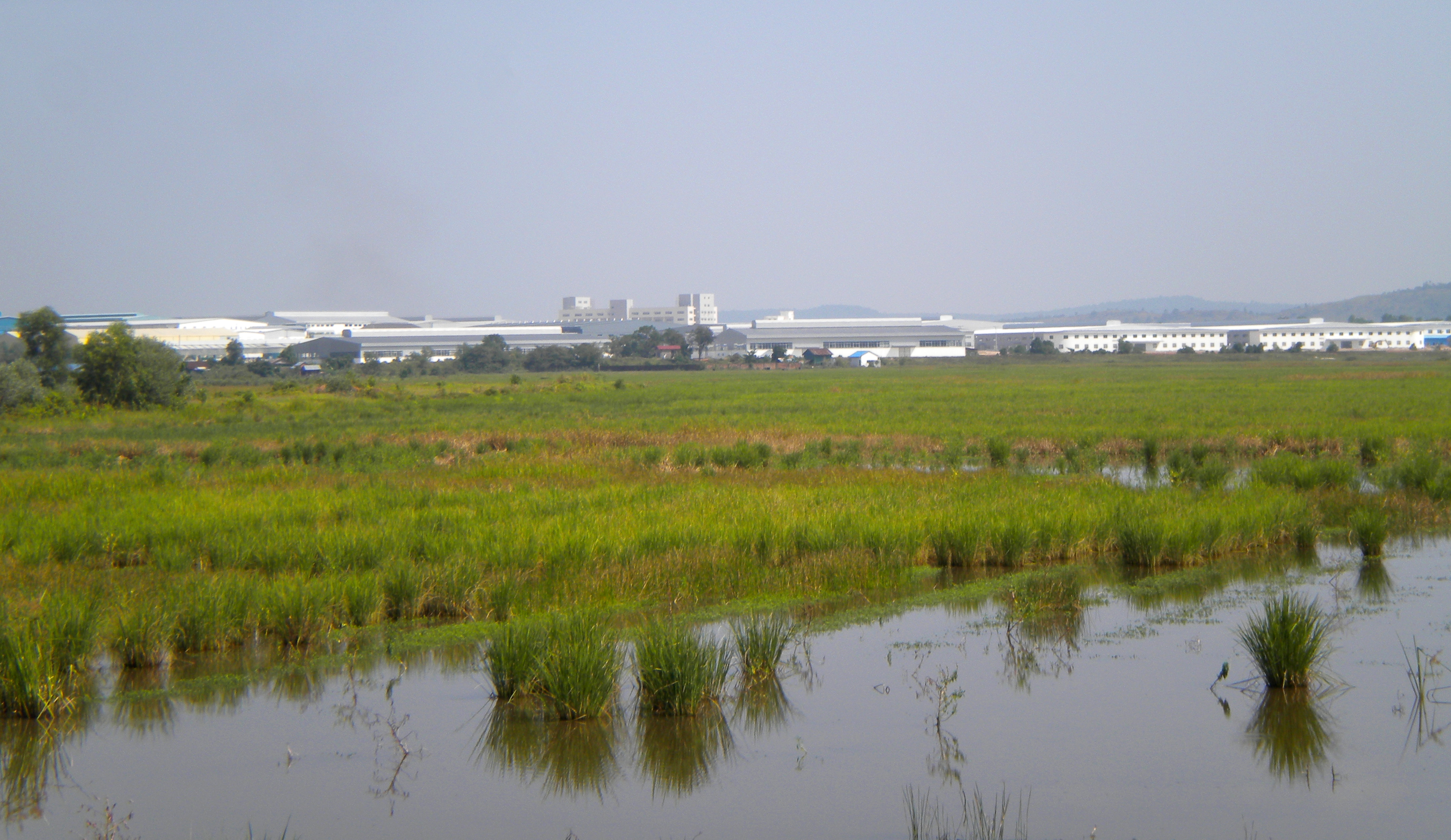
Sihanoukville's Special Economic Zone (SSEZ) as seen from National Highway No. 4 near Ream commune

The Sihanoukville Special Economic Zone (SSEZ) is an economic and trade cooperation zone which was designed to promote favorable market conditions such as: policy advantages, a safe political environment, favorable trade status, completed infrastructure, and cheap labor. In addition to its areas around the port, a sizable industrial center, exclusively composed of Chinese companies has been developed since around 2010.

=== Sihanoukville Autonomous Port ===
The Sihanoukville Autonomous Port has an independent administration. In combination with the related logistics and transport sector it is the city's economic backbone.

At present, the total operational land area of the Sihanoukville Autonomous Port is around 124.76 ha. The Old Jetty was constructed in 1956 and became operational in 1960. The jetty is 290 m long by 28 m wide and can accommodate four vessels with medium GT at both sides. The exterior berth is -8.50 m to 13 m depth, while the interior berth is -7.50 m to -8.50 m depth.

In order to cope with the increasing volume of cargo, the Royal Government of Cambodia had constructed another 350 m (1,148 ft) long new quay with −10.5 m (−34 ft) maximum draft in 1966. At present, this new quay can accommodate three vessels with −7 m (−23 ft) draft. The construction of the container terminal, 400 m (1,312 ft) long by −10.5 m (−34 ft) depth and a 6.5 ha (16 acres) container yard was completed in March 2007.

	Sihanoukville Autonomous Port Traffic Volumes						
Item	2003	2004	2005	2006	2007	2008	9M2009
Gross Throughput (Tons)	1,772,361	1,503,050	1,380,847	1,586,791	1,818,877	2,057,967	1,405,338
Not Included Fuel	1,454,856	1,242,011	1,131,699	1,320,102	1,428,992	1,605,672	958,279
Not Include Fuel &Cont.	650,329	308,153	107,929	197,573	193,573	291,114	162,520
Cargo Containerized	804,527	933,858	1,023,770	1,122,529	1,235,419	1,314,559	795,759
Container Throughput (TEUs)	181,286	213,916	211,141	231,036	253,271	258,775	157,639
Vessel Calling (Units)	878	730	686	912	876	954	642

- Primary Destinations: Singapore, Hong Kong, Bangkok, Ho Chi Minh City, Shanghai, Laem Chabang, Yantian, Kaohsiung
- Frequency of scheduled services: 38/week

The Sihanoukville Autonomous Port was finished in 1960 as the international sea port of Cambodia. It has an area of 290 meters length and 28 meters width. Its exterior berth depth is 8.50 to 13 meters and 7.50 to 8.50 meters depth in the interior. Four medium vessels can simultaneously moor at the port.

The port is 18 kilometers (11 miles) from the Kaong Kang Airport and four kilometers (2 miles) from Sihanoukville town. Ships' passengers are allowed to visit Sihanoukville town. The terminal itself has no shopping center, banking or tourist offices, only toilets.

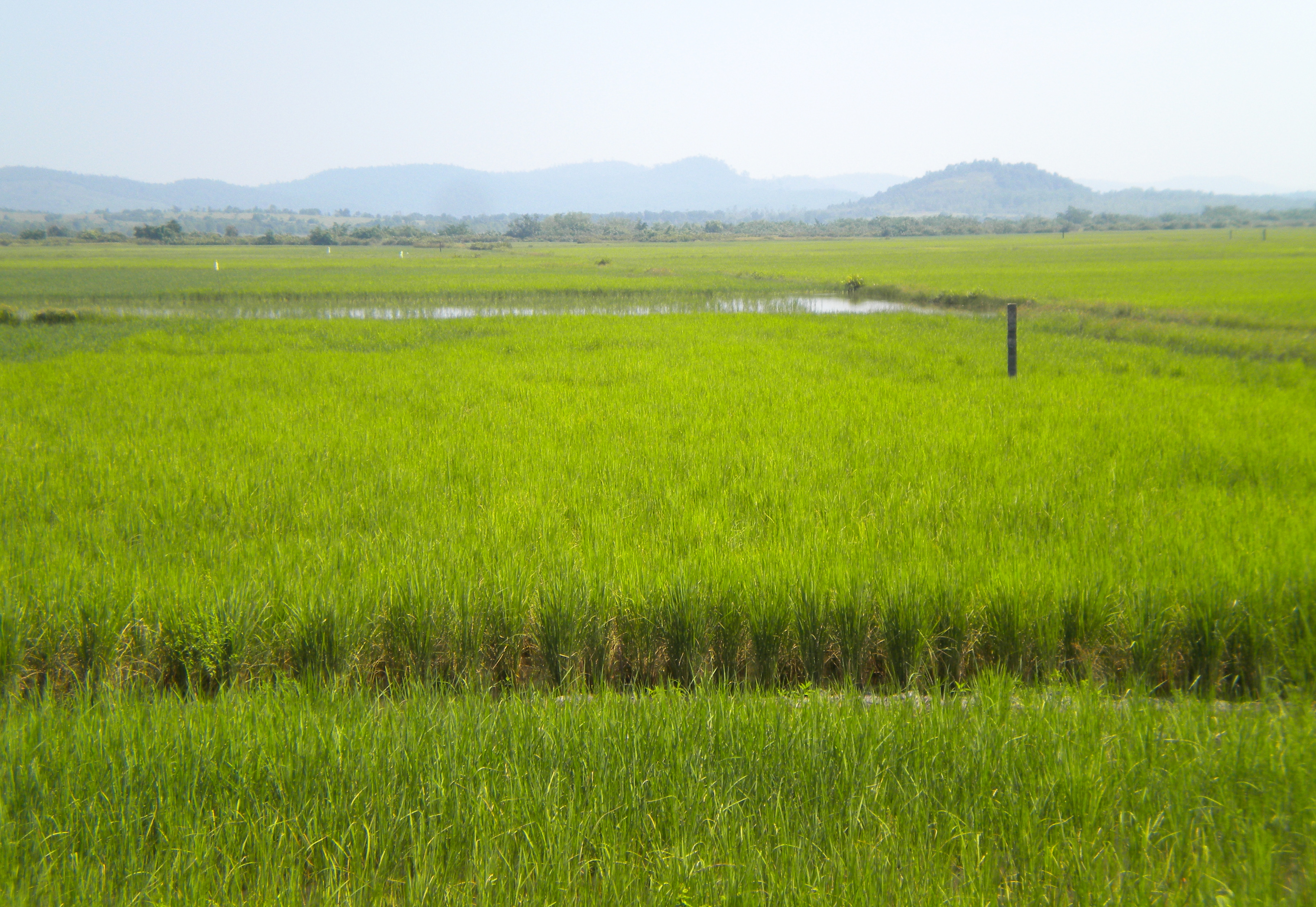
Rice paddies in Prei Nob, October 2014

=== Agriculture ===
As one of Cambodia's smallest provinces numbers of rice tonnage (37,211) are of little relevance for the annual statistics. Still Preah Sihanouk province has been able to diversify in subsidiary and industrial crops, fruits and permanent crops and incorporates fisheries (40,100 tons) into the sector.

- Agricultural Land: 106,163.746 ha included 15,000 h of rice fields
- Irrigation drainage: Total length: 132 km, Dam/dike: Total length: 90 km

=== Fisheries ===
Although the province is endowed with relatively abundant natural resources, protection thereof is of greatest significance. Pollution remains a concern particularly from trade vessels, domestic waste, and local industry. Resources are being indiscriminately diminished by illegal fishing via the neighboring countries. Seagrass beds and coral reefs are also under continued stress from over-exploitation and destructive activities.

The catching and processing of marine fisheries products is undertaken by both small-scale family style operations as well as on a large commercial level. Most coastal fishers lack the resources to procure suitable fishing equipment for coastal fishing. They, thus, tend to use small-scale fishing gear appropriate for inland use. The offshore net catch capacity of Cambodian fishers is relatively small compared to the available exploitation potential. The marine component of the fisheries sector in Cambodia is not nearly as important as that of the inland areas because of consumer preference for inland fish species. Sport fishing is popular with barracuda and marlin being the main target fish. Boats regularly operate from Otres Marina

== Transport ==
=== Roads and streets ===
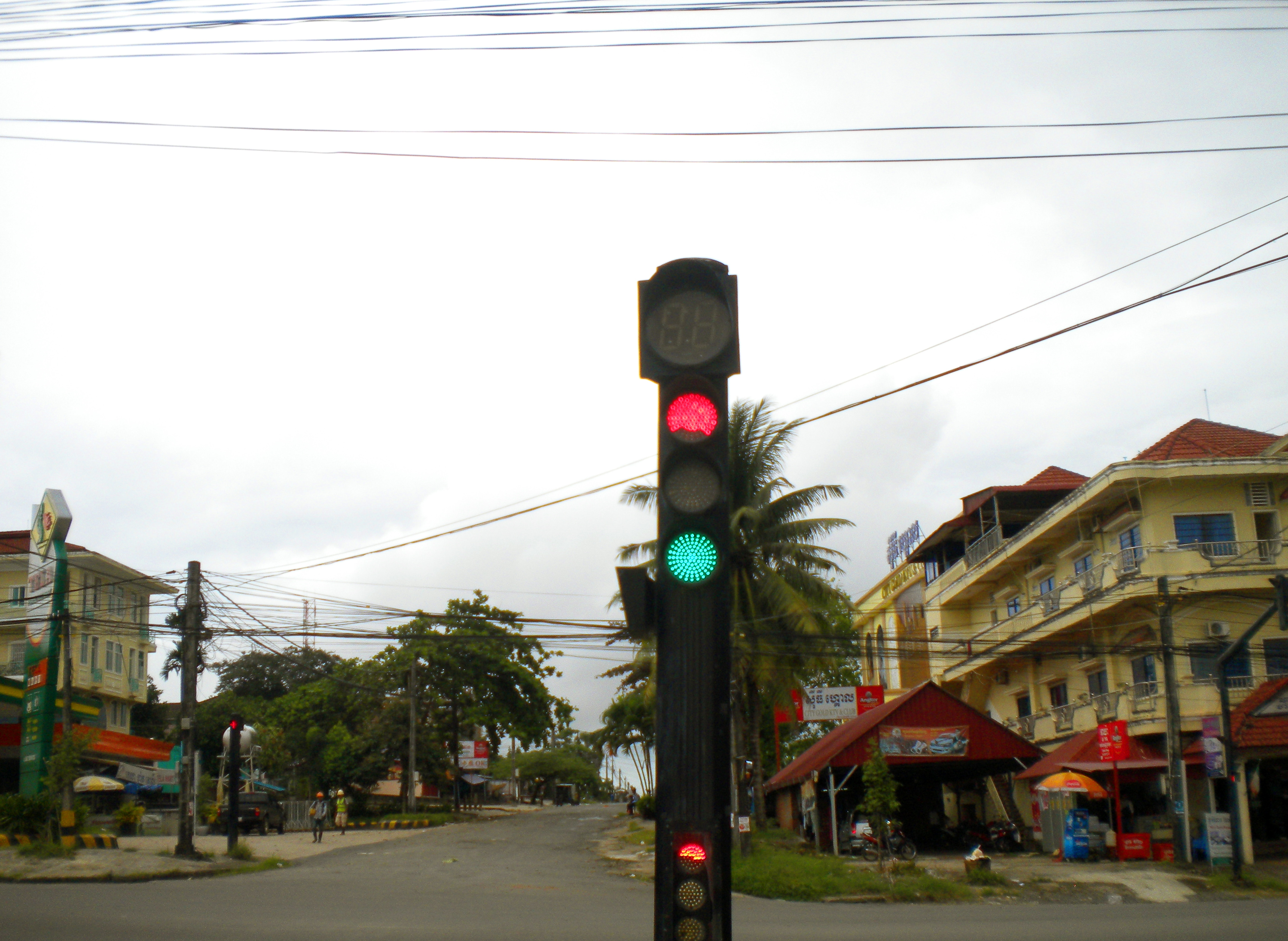
Malfunctioning traffic light

- National Highway 4: Phnom Penh and Sihanoukville are connected by the National Road 4. The road was built and financed by the United States to accommodate heavy freight containers and petroleum tanker trucks connecting the port with Phnom Penh. There are three toll stations along its nd 250 km length. It is considered the most dangerous road of Cambodia due to dense traffic, regular traffic accidents, and lack of enforcement.
- National Highway 3: Connects Sihanoukville with Kampot province. The road joins NR4 at Prey Nob District. It is paved and but largely lacks traffic signs. Free roaming cattle and other livestock regularly block road traffic. The road underwent significant refurbishment in 2008 and forms part of an international "north-south economic corridor" from Kunming in China to Bangkok in Thailand.
- National Highway 48: Connects Sihanoukville and Phnom Penh with Koh Kong province, in southwest Cambodia. The road ends at the Thai-Cambodian border. The old four ferry crossing points over the estuaries along the route were replaced by bridges. This road has very little traffic.

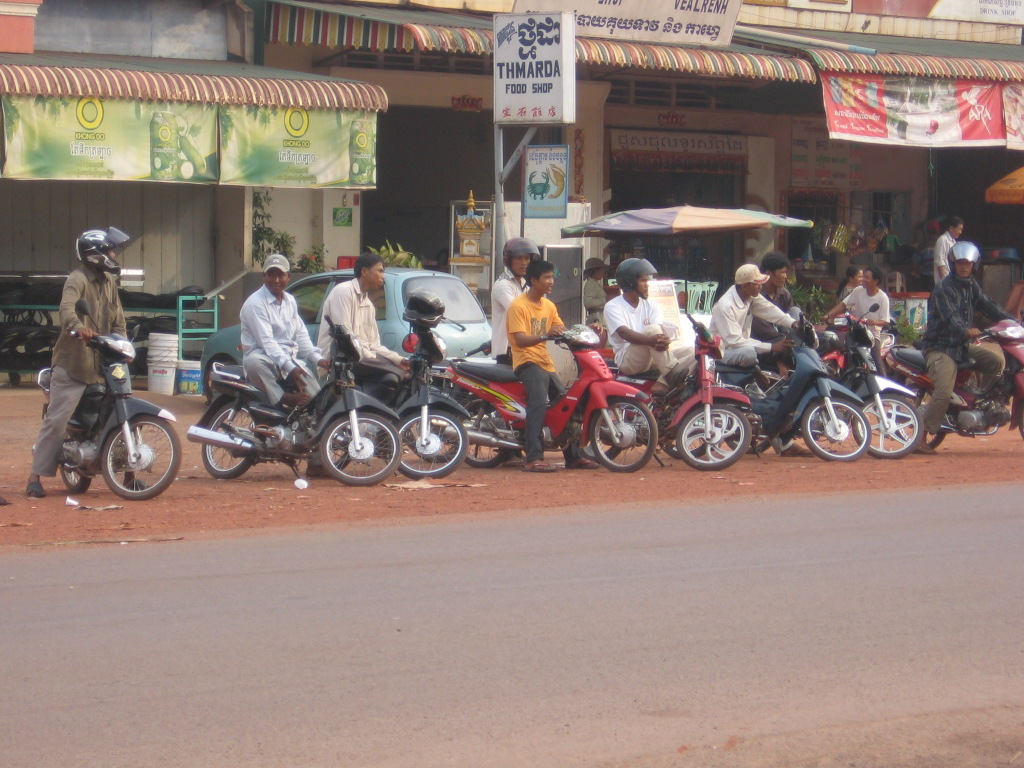
Moto-dups (taxi motorbikes) wait for customers at "Psar Peanichakam", Sihanoukville.

Streets in Sihanoukville town and province are in relative good condition. However, traffic does not obey traffic laws, the police do little in the way of enforcement of international norms. Cambodia drives on the right. In urban and residential areas there is an abundance of motorbikes due to the absence of public transportation and taxis. Highways and Sihanoukville city are considered unsafe for driving. Drivers of motorbikes do not wear helmets, drive indiscriminately on either side of the street, do not have mirrors and it is common to see motorbikes with more than two passengers or vehicles driven by children and underage persons. Traffic lights are ignored altogether. In 2008 the government ordered the enforcement of the use of helmets countrywide, but these rules are not yet followed.

The province does not have a scheduled public transportation system. Therefore, there exists an informal communal and urban transportation system of mini buses, taxis, motor-taxis (moto-dups) and tuk-tuks. This system is not administered by authorities, as anybody can become a bus, motor-taxi, or tuk-tuk driver. As a consequence, prices of services are ad-hoc, insurance non-existent, and service quality varies considerably.

=== Airport ===
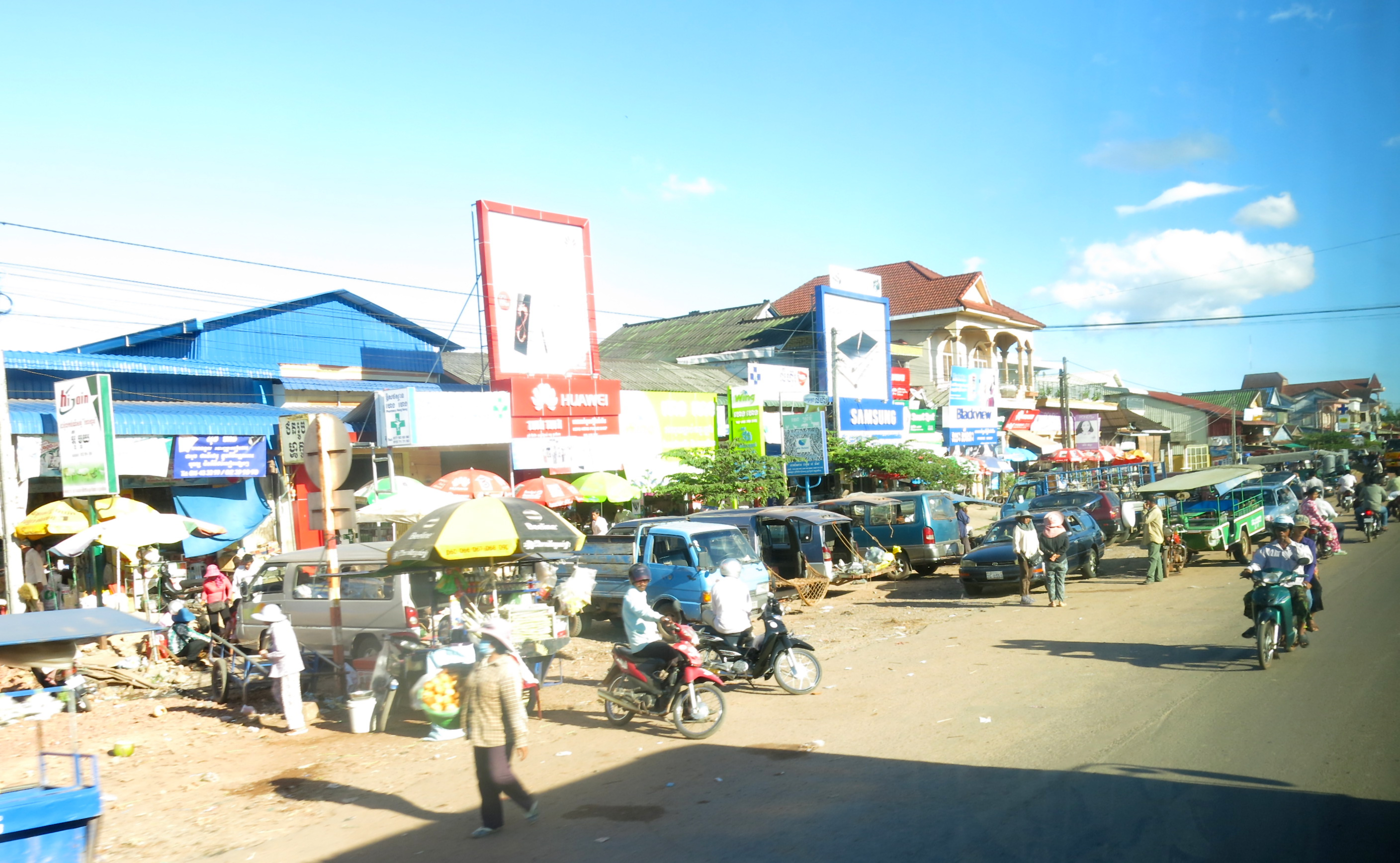
Veal Rinh town in Prey Nob District, Sihanoukville province, Cambodia, 2015

The province is served by Sihanouk International Airport, 18 kilometres (11 mi) from Sihanoukville town, although as of 2014 it sees limited commercial operation. The airport currently only schedules national passenger flights of Cambodia Angkor Air to Siem Reap and Phnom Penh. The airport's former name, Kaong Kang (កោងកាង, 'mangrove') reflects its site on top of a drained mangrove marsh by the sea in Ream commune in southern Sihanoukville province near National Highway 4.

=== Buses and long-distance taxis ===
Long-distance-buses start in Sihanoukville city near the port. Cambodia is home to many competing companies that offer frequent services to all major provinces. Direct destinations are Phnom Penh, Koh Kong, and Kampot. Some companies offer services to Bangkok, Ho Chi Minh City, and Siem Reap through a connection in Phnom Penh.

=== Marine transport ===
The last daily national official marine ferry service from/to Sihanoukville city to/from Krong Koh Kong ceased operation with the completion of National Highway 48 in 2007.

Koh Rong and Koh Rong Sanloem have daily ferry service. Access to smaller islands is generally provided by local holiday resorts, dive operators, the marina at Otres, or private operators. Additionally, small long-tail boats and medium size cruising boats can be hired for sightseeing, fishing, diving and drinking trips at the marina at Otres, guest houses, travel agencies and diving operators.

Marina Oceania, the first marina in Cambodia, is operational and fully equipped since 2013 for yachts and boats up to 25 meters with 4-5 meter deep berths for 20 boats. It is at the local port's pier, near Koh Preab. (coordinates: 10° 39' 59" N / 103° 30' 41" E).

Holiday Cruise ships infrequently stop by at the port during their voyages in Southeast Asia.

=== Rail ===
The railway network of Cambodia was re-constructed for freight transport by Toll Holdings, which has obtained a building and maintenance concession from the Royal Cambodian Railway. The "Southern Line", constructed 1960-1969 with a length of 264 km, connects the Sihanoukville Port Special Economic Zone with the capital Phnom Penh.

The currently rather deteriorated train station near the Autonomous Port used to manage passenger train transportation to Phnom Penh via Kampot before 1975.

== Demographics ==
The 2008 census of Cambodia counted 199,902 inhabitants of Sihanoukville province.

	Population Projections for Sihanoukville province 2008-2016								
Year	2008	2009	2010	2011	2012	2013	2014	2015	2016
Total	229,205	235,095	241,154	247,355	253,654	260,034	266,470	272,933	279,419
Male	114,680	117,735	120,872	124,076	127,324	130,607	133,913	137,227	140,545
Female	114,525	117,360	120,282	123,279	126,330	129,427	132,557	135,706	138,874
Annual Growth		2.57	2.58	2.57	2.55	2.52	2.47	2.43	2.38
Sex Ratio	100.1	100.3	100.5	100.6	100.9	101.0	101.1	101.2	101.3
Median Age	21.8	22.3	22.8	23.3	23.7	24.2	24.7	25.1	25.6

Khmer are the main ethnic group. In addition, there are other groups: Vietnamese, Chinese, Cham, Thai, French, British, Korean Europeans, Australians, and Americans, due to its status as an international port and a tourist destination. Krong Preah Sihanouk has a relative high Human Development Index (HDI) of 0.750 in average, compared to the national average HDI of 0.523.

According to a report in the Bangkok Post nearly 78,000 Chinese nationals live in the province in 2019, only 20,000 with official work permits. The influx has caused housing prices to soar.

== Culture ==
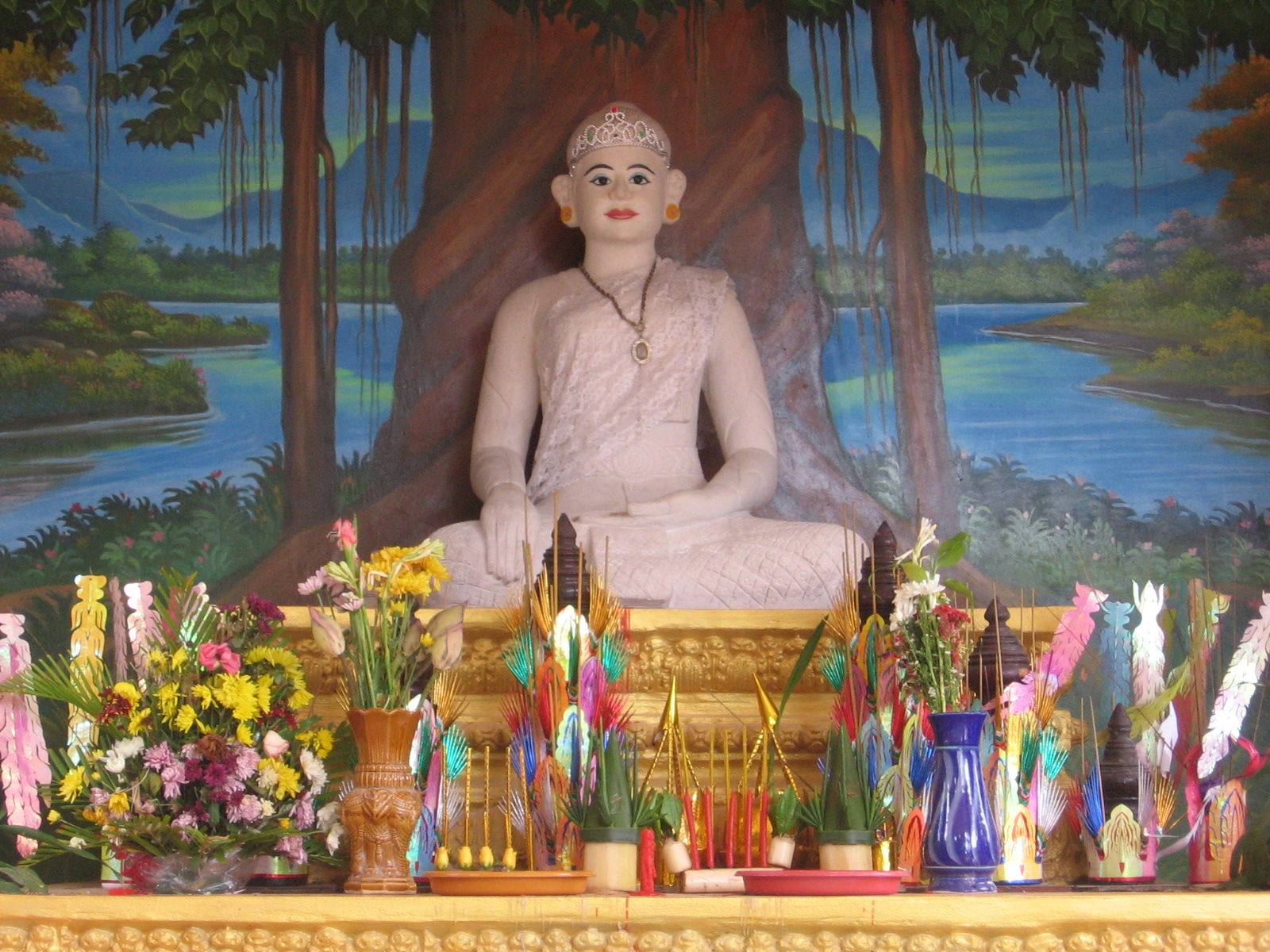
Yeay Mao, a guardian spirit at Pich Nil is venerated throughout Sihanoukville province

The majority of the province's inhabitants are of East Asian descent, which profoundly characterize and influence local customs, moral, commerce, cuisine, and tradition based on pan-East Asian beliefs and ideas. Cambodian culture is of distinct ancient Khmer origin, accompanied by century-old Chinese and Vietnamese cultural influences. The prolonged presence of foreign and in particular Western people in Cambodia and Sihanoukville town contributes to a noticeable varied, modern, multi-cultural manifestation, which is increasingly influenced by modern media.

The inhabitants of Sihanoukville province celebrate all religious, traditional and secular festivities such as Cambodian New Year (April), Chinese New Year (between January and February), Water Festival (November), Pchum Ben (honor to the ancestors in October) and Kathen Ceremony (offerings to the monks), 8 January (Day of Cambodian - Vietnamese Friendship) among others.

The ethnic and minority religious groups celebrate Christmas Day (25 December) and Holy Week for the Catholics, Ramadan for the Muslims, Valentine's Day and the International New Year (31 December).

Many urban families of Chinese or Sino-Khmer descent in Sihanoukville city have for most of Cambodia's history constituted the commercial elite and urban upper classes which was dominated by the ruling Cambodian People's Party (CPP). Besides the expressed Buddhist faith there is a strong dedication to Confucian work ethics, on commercial conduct and trade procedures while family bonds are very strong.

== Religion ==
As of 2004, there were 27 Theravada Buddhist pagodas in the province with a population of 1,918 monks. Buddhist Pagodas are central in Cambodian culture as the defining spiritual source of villages and cities.

Pagodas/Wats in Sihanoukville province
Name	Official	District	Commune	Village	Abbot	Congregation (p.p.)	Monastery	Image
Wat Bodh Meanchey	វត្តពោធិ៍មានជ័យ	Stung Hav	Kampenh		Ven. Leng Hee	persons	yes	
Wat Ta Ney	វត្តតានៃ	Prey Nup	Jerng Ko	Ta Ney		persons		
Wat Kampong Sila	វត្តកំពង់សិលា	Kampong Sila				persons		
Wat Silavontaram	វត្ត	Kampong Sila	Jamkar Hluong	Boeng Trach		persons		
Wat Jotannana/Wat Leu	វត្ត	Mittakpheap	Sangkat		Ven. Kiet Chanthuch	persons	yes	
Wat Indannana/Wat Krom	វត្ត	Mittakpheap	Sangkat		Ven. Sassana Saingvara Moul Rorn	persons	yes	
Wat O Tres	វត្តអូរត្រែះ	Mittakpheap	Sangkat 4			persons	no	
Wat Ream	វត្តរាម	Prey Nup				persons		
Wat Uddom Vinnanaram	វត្ត	Prey Nup				persons		
Wat Kiri Swa Ra	វត្ត	Prey Nup	Ream			persons	no	
Wat Ream 3	វត្តរាម ៣	Prey Nup				persons		
Wat Uddom Priksa	វត្តឧត្តមព្រឹក្សា	Prey Nup				persons		
Source: Wats in Sihanoukville province - Templenews

Sihanoukville province is also home to minor communities of other religions such as: Catholics, Muslims, Protestants and Taoists. Places of worship:

- St. Michael's Church: It is the center of the Catholic communities. The church was built in 1960 by sailors, it is on the same hill as the Upper Pagoda, facing the sea.
- Iber Bikhalifah Mosque: It is the religious center of the local Muslim community. It is in Sihanoukville town, in the populous, central Psah Leu (upper market) area.

Religion in Cambodia
Religion	percent
Buddhism	97.1%
Islam	2.0%
Christianity	0.3%
Others	0.5%

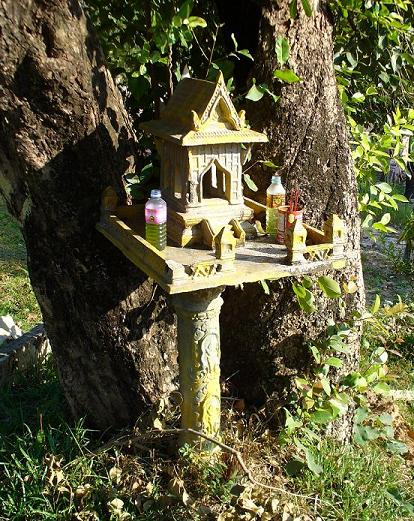
A shrine to ancestors.

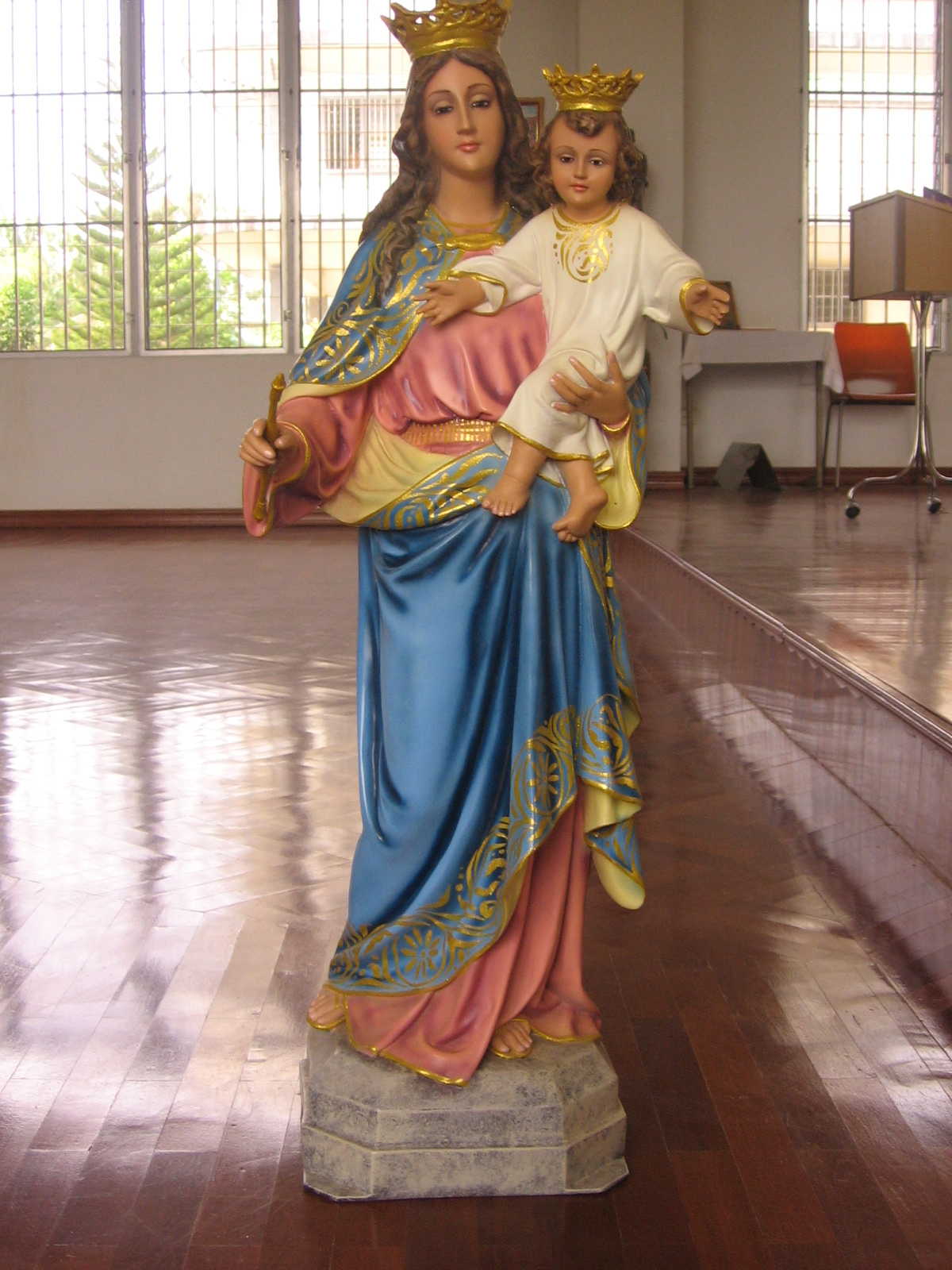
Statue of Mary at Saint Francis de Sales Chapel

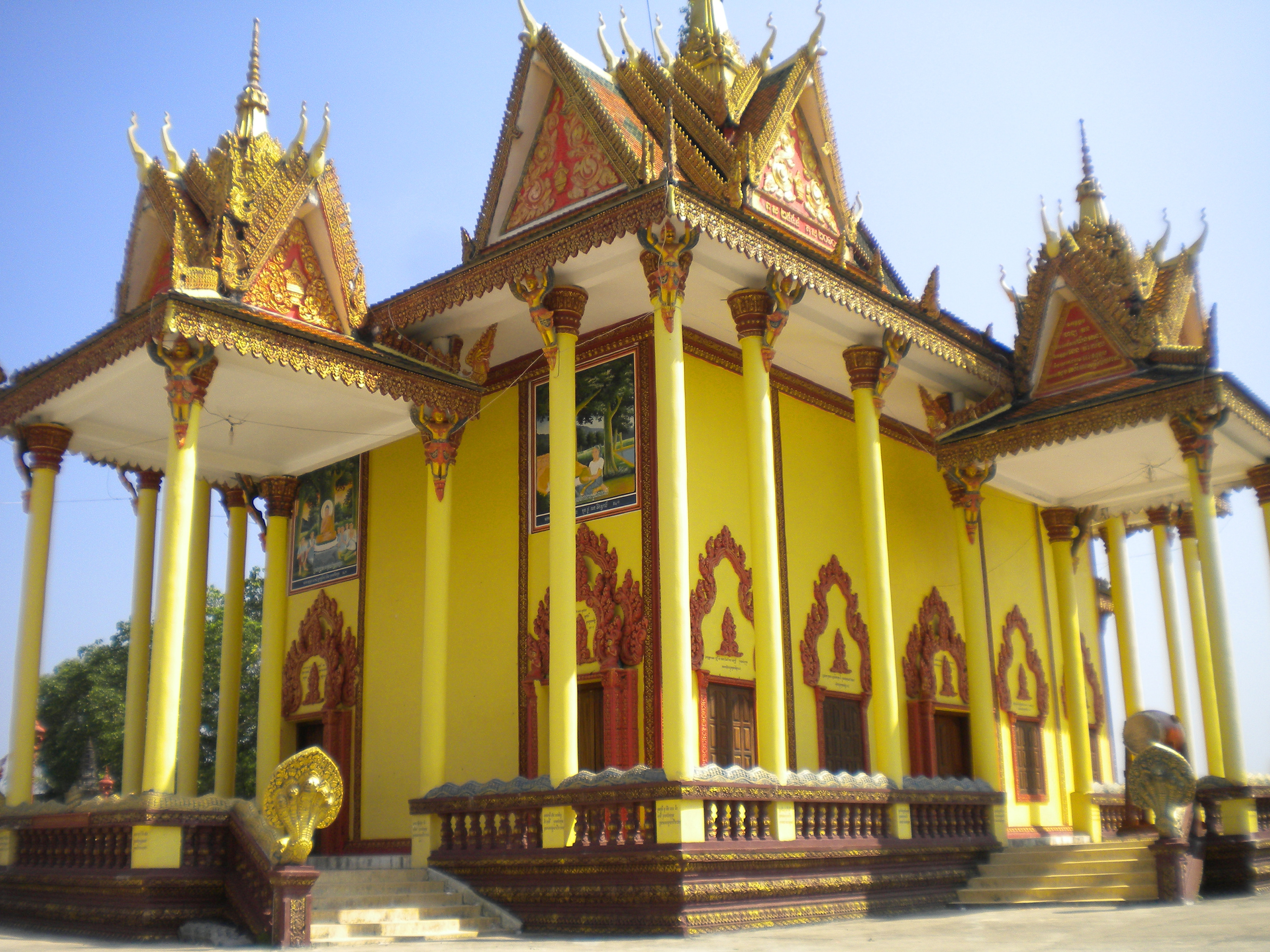
Wat Kiri Swa Ra

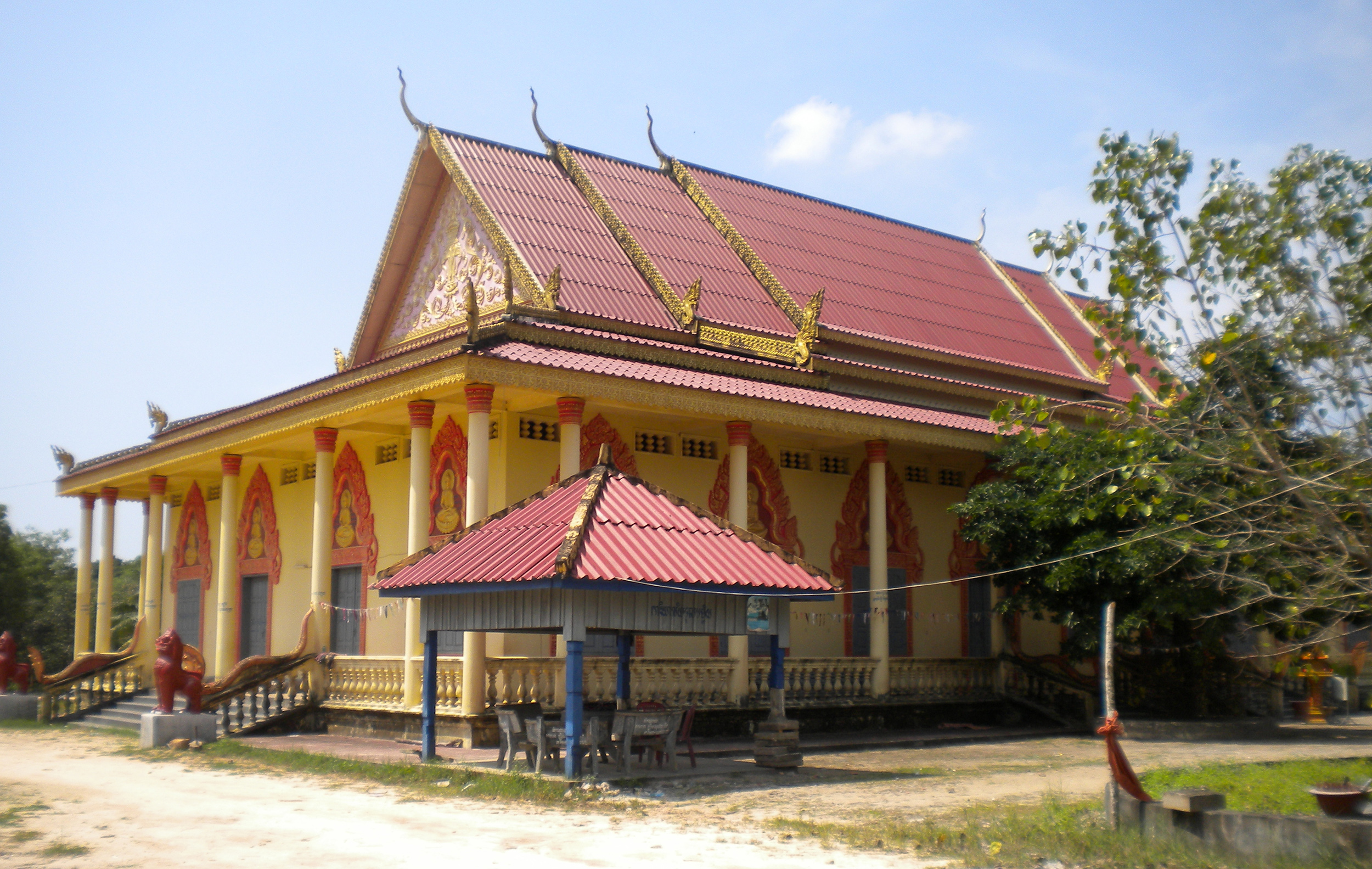
Wat Otres

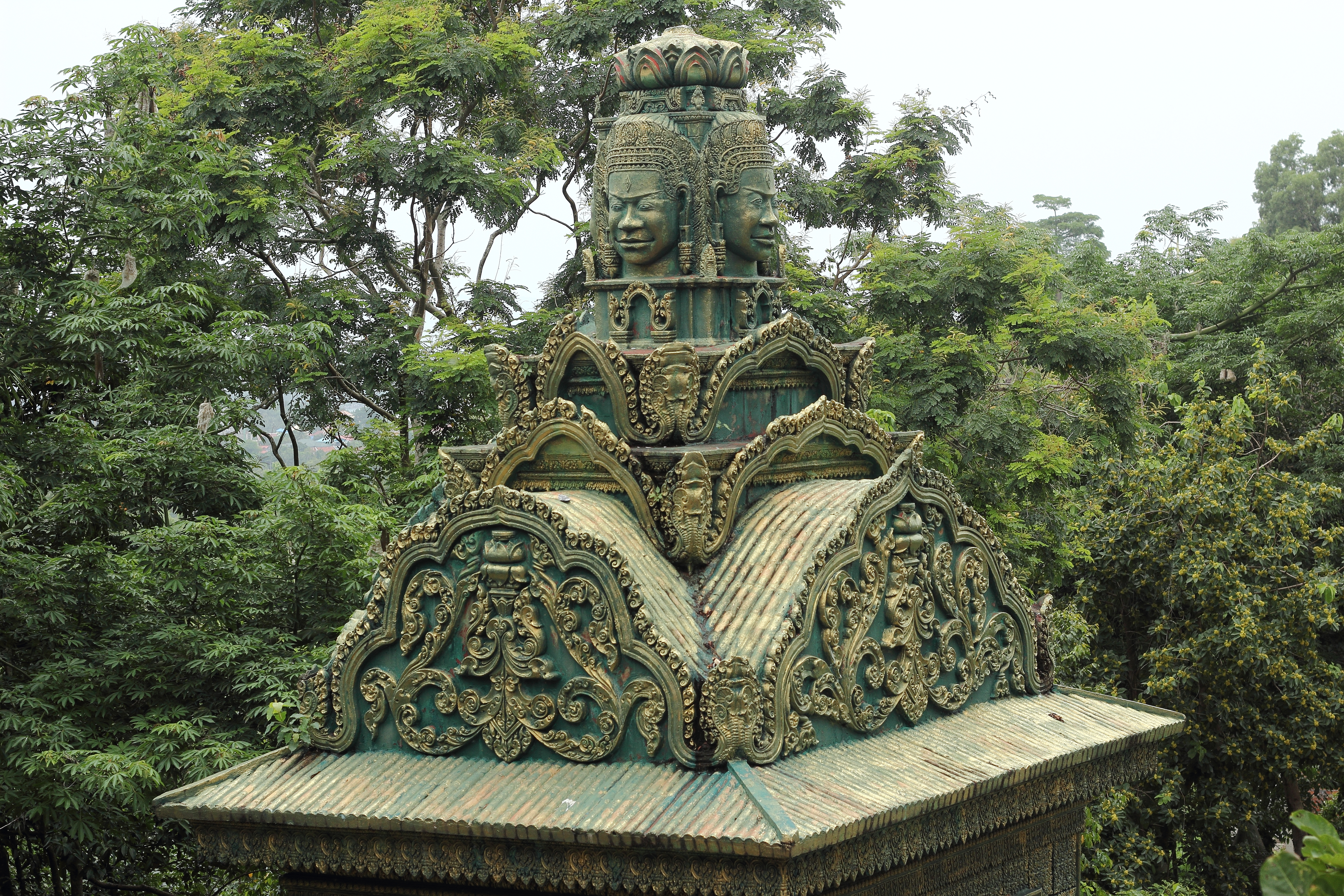
Wat Leu

== Education ==
Public spending on education in Cambodia, totaled 2.60% (of GDP) as of 2010.

Cambodian general education is based on the national school curriculum that consists of:

1. Basic education The basic education curriculum is divided into three cycles of three years each. The first cycle (grade 1-3) consists of 27-30 lessons per week lasting 40 minutes which are allocated to five main subjects. The second cycle (grade 4-6) consists of the same number of lessons but is slightly different. The third cycle (grade 7-9) consists of 32-35 lessons which are allocated for seven major subjects.

2. Upper secondary education The upper Secondary Education curriculum consists of two different phases. The curriculum for the first phase (grade 10) is identical to the third cycle of primary education. The second phase (grade 11-12) has two main components: Compulsory and Electives.

The total adult literacy rate of Sihanoukville is 95%. The 2004 statistics show the following centers of education: 33 pre-schools with 1,670 children, 52 primary schools with 34,863 students, five colleges with 4,794 students; two high schools with 1,449 students; 10 vocational training with 961 students, and 13,728 students in private schools.

Private educational institutes in Sihanoukville are: Life University, University of Management and Economics, Built Bright University, Khmer Technology and Management Center, Don Bosco Technical School and Don Bosco Hotel School.

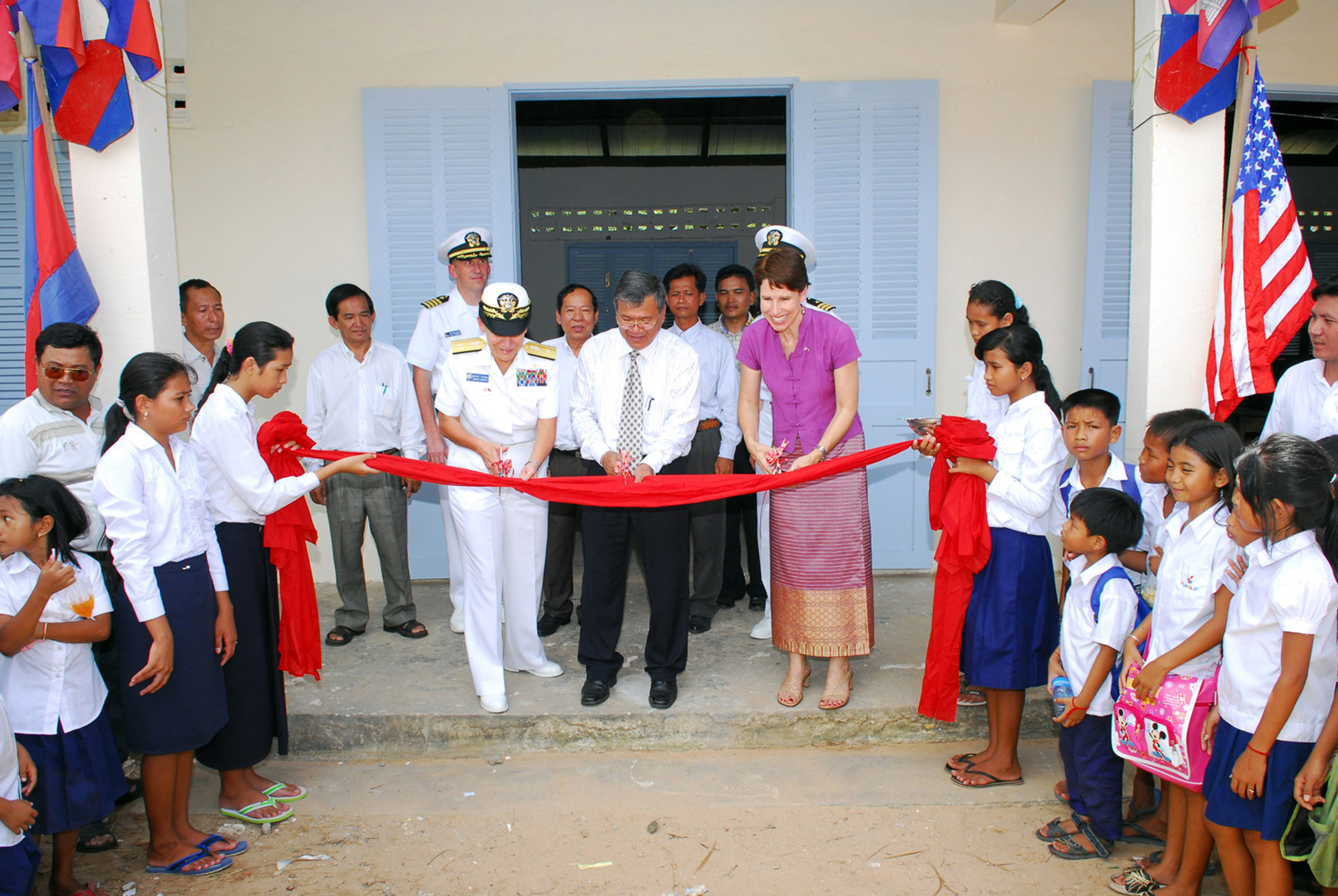
Ribbon cutting ceremony of the engineering civil action project

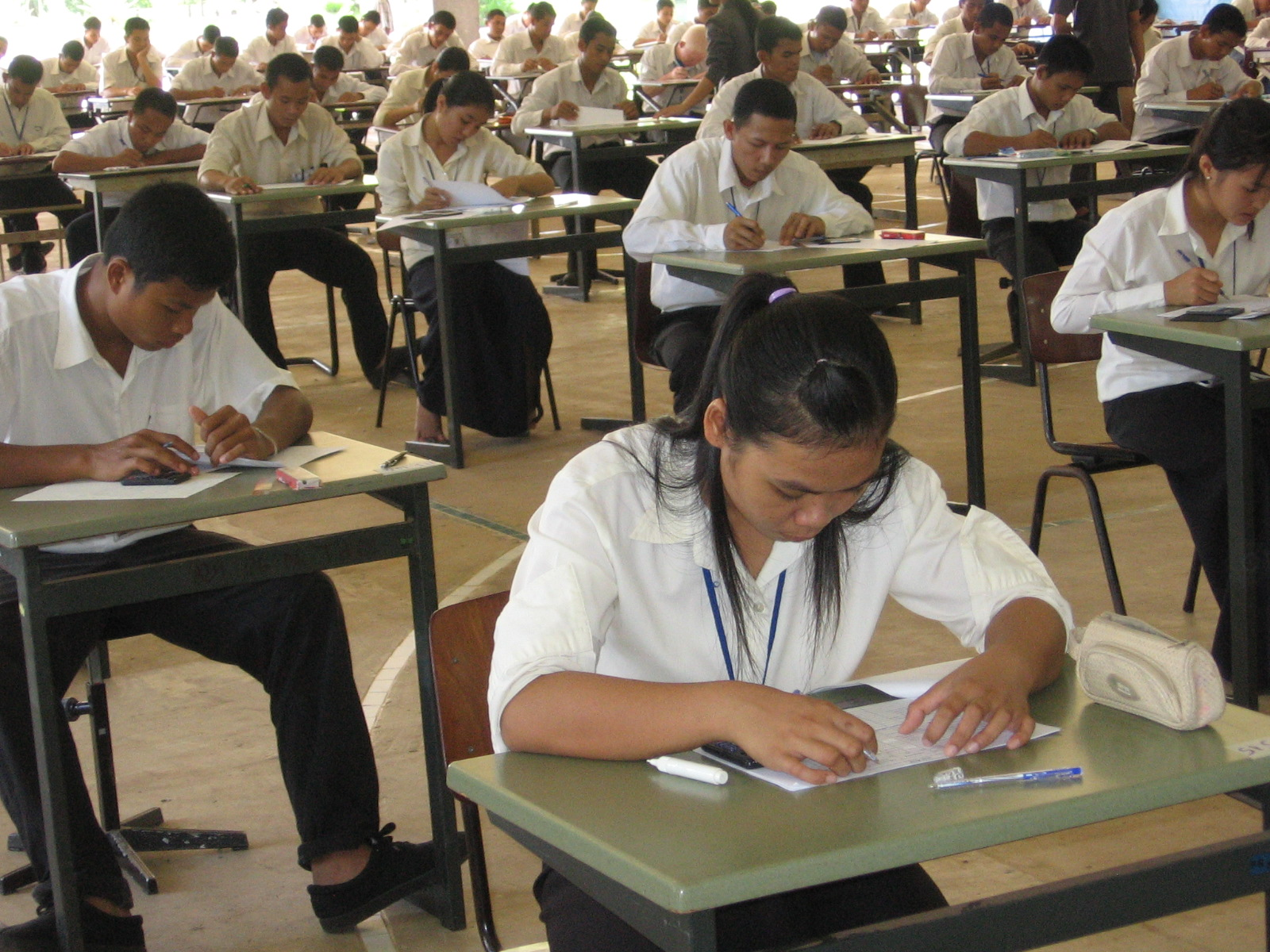
Cambodians doing an exam in order to apply for the Don Bosco Technical School of Sihanoukville in 2008.

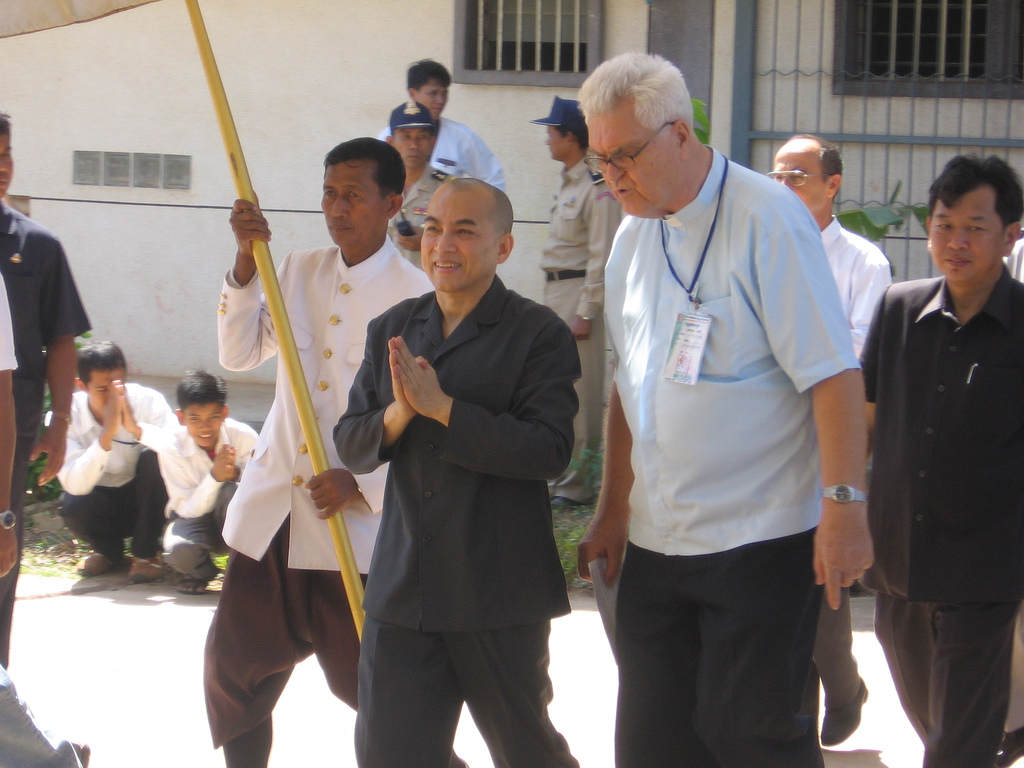
His Majesty Norodom Sihamoni opened officially the Don Bosco Hotel School.

== Sister cities ==
- Miami, United States
- Seattle, United States
- Swansea, South Wales, United Kingdom

== Bibliography ==
- Vann, Molyvann (2003). Modern Khmer Cities. Cambodia: Reyum Press. ISBN 9789995055349.
- Chandler, David (1993). A History of Cambodia. Cambodia: Allen & Unwin. ISBN 9781863734653.
- Cœdès, George (1966). The making of South East Asia. University of California Press. ISBN 0-520-05061-4.
- Kitagawa, T. 2005, "'Kampot' of the belle epoque: from the outlet of Cambodia to a colonial rule", in Southeast Asian Studies = Tonan Ajia kenkyu, vol. 42, no. 4,
- Kampot of the Belle Epoque: From the Outlet of Cambodia to a Colonial Resort
- Henri Mouhot: Travels in Siam, Cambodia, Laos, and Annam, White Lotus Co, Ltd., ISBN 974-8434-03-6
- Cœdès, George (1968). The Indianized States of Southeast Asia. University of Hawaii Press. ISBN 978-0824803681.
- Philpotts, Robert (2006). A Port for Independence. England: Blackwater Books. ISBN 2-9513524-0-9.
