= Kep =

Kep or KEP may refer to:

== Kep ==
=== Australia ===
- Kep Track

=== Cambodia ===
- Kep Province
  - Kep District
    - Krong Kep (town)
- Kep National Park

=== Vietnam ===
- Kép, Vietnam
  - Kép Railway Station
- Kep Campaign, Sino-French War (1884–1885)

=== Other ===
- Kep Enderby (1926–2015), Australian politician

== KEP ==
- King Edward Point, South Georgia
- Greek acronym for Movement of Free Citizens, a short-lived Greek political party
- Greek acronym for Citizens Service Centres which provide municipal services to citizens
- Kinetic energy penetrator
- Korea Engineering Plastics
- Kyrgyz Express Post
