= Koh Ach Seh =

Cambodian island in the Gulf of Thailand

Native name: កោះអាចម៍សេះ
- Location within Cambodia

Geography
- Location: Southeast Asia
- Coordinates: 10°21′26.5″N 104°19′12.7″E

Administration
- Cambodia
- Province: Kep
- Municipality: Kep

Koh Ach Seh (Khmer: កោះអាចម៍សេះ) is a Cambodian island located off the country's southern coast in the Gulf of Thailand. "Koh Ach Seh" translates to 'Horseback Riding Island', however the name is popular evolving to just Koh Seh - Horse Island. The island is part of Kep Archipelago, and is being administered by Kep Province.

During the Cambodian–Vietnamese War, the Khmer Rouge used Koh Seh as an outpost. Military bunkers and fruit trees planted by the Khmer Rouge as a food source are still visible on the island.

Since 2013, the island has been home to Marine Conservation Cambodia, a non-profit, marine conservation organisation which has helped setting up the Kep Archipelago Marine Fisheries Management Area, and is now in charge of its management. MCC has been lent most of the island by the Kep government, except for the very southern part of the island which is home to a small marine police station and fishermen shelters

Koh Ach Seh is sometimes mistaken with Koh Seh, located inside Ream National Park, Sihanoukville province.

== See also ==
- List of islands of Cambodia
