= Phnom Voar =

Mountain range in Cambodia

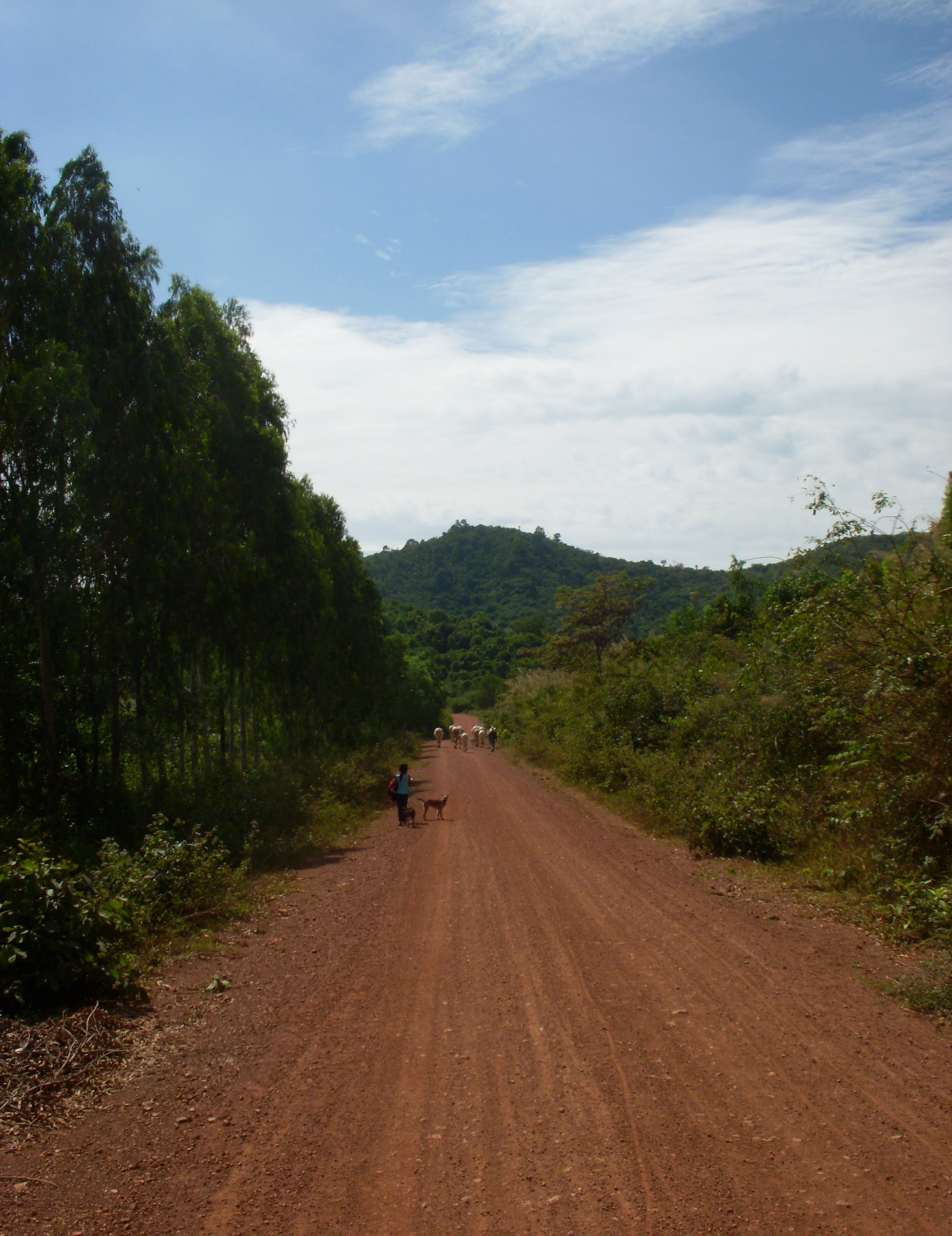

Highest point
- Elevation: 284 m (932 ft)
- Coordinates: 10°29′00″N 104°18′00″E

Geography
- Location within Cambodia
- Location: Cambodia

Phnom Voar (Khmer: ភ្នំវល្លិ) is a small range of mountains in southern Cambodia. The mountain range is located in Damnak Chang'eaur District of Kep Province, near the border with Kampot Province. This relatively isolated range became notorious as a battleground during the Cambodian Civil War, when it was a base for communist insurgent forces and the target of significant bombing by B-52s and other air strikes.

The main north south railway line between Phnom Penh and Sihanoukville runs along the base of the mountain. National road 33 between Kampong Trach and Kampot also runs nearby. However, there are few roads or paths within the mountains and only two permanent communities: Chamkar Bei and Rones villages.

== History ==
Between 1975 and 1979, the area around Phnom Voar was the site of several killing fields and two prisons run by the Santebal – the secret police of the Democratic Kampuchea regime.

After the fall of the Khmer Rouge in 1979, Phnom Voar became one of the southern rebel bases for the remaining Democratic Kampuchea forces and on July 26, 1994, Phnom Voar rose to international attention as the site of a Khmer Rouge attack on a Cambodian train that resulted in the deaths of at least 8 people (three government soldiers, at least four Khmer Rouge and one civilian passenger) and led to the mass-kidnapping of more than 100 hostages (including at least two Cambodians, three Vietnamese, and three westerners, all of whom were later killed).

The exact circumstances of the deaths of the hostages remains unclear with some reports indicating that they died perhaps as early as September, 1994 or possibly after 15 October 1994. Regardless, their bodies were found on November 2, 1994.

Chhouk Rin, a Khmer Rouge officer at the time, was later convicted of the murders of the three western hostages and as of April, 2013 was serving out a life sentence in Prey Sar Prison.

== After the war ==
Since 1994, and the capture or surrender of the last rebel forces in the mountains, Phnom Voar has attracted significant attention from international NGOs, particularly from Unesco in 1998. These agencies have been attempting to improve health, education and livelihoods for villagers who had missed the rapid development and reconstruction of the rest of the country due to years of isolation and war.
