= Damnak Chang'aeur district =

Damnak Chang'aeur ដំណាក់ចង្អើរ
- District
- Damnak Chang'aeur District ស្រុកដំណាក់ចង្អើរ
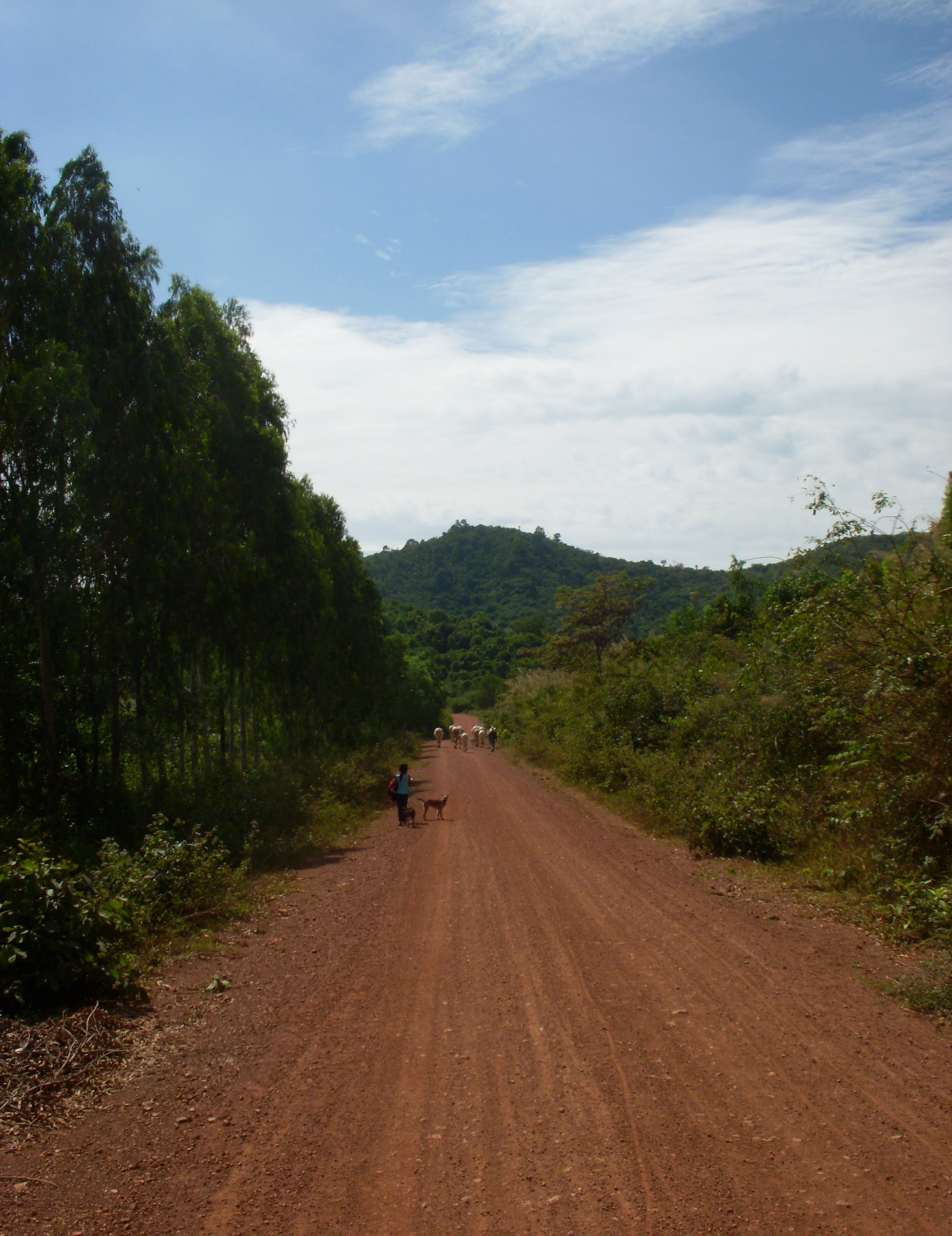
- Phnom Voar road

- Location within Cambodia
- Coordinates: 10°32′2.18″N 104°20′54.78″E
- Country: Cambodia
- Province: Kep

Population (1998)
  - Total: 18,341
- Time zone: UTC+07:00 (ICT)

Damnak Chang'aeur (Khmer: ដំណាក់ចង្អើរ, UNGEGN: Dâmnăk Châng'aeur [ɗɑmnak cɑŋʔaə], lit. 'staircase') is a district (srok) in Kep Province, Cambodia. It is the largest district in the province and a train track from Phnom Penh to Sihanoukville runs through here. The district is subdivided into three communes (khum) and 11 villages (phum).

== History ==
In June 1994, Phnom Voar in Damnak Chang'aeur hit the international headlines as the site of the kidnapping of three westerners, Australian David Wilson, 29, Briton Mark Slater, 28, and Frenchman Jean-Michel Braquet, 27 from a train by Khmer Rouge forces led by Commander Chouk Rin.

== Subdivisions ==
- 230101 អង្កោល Angkoul Commune: It is at the west, bordering Kampot at its west, the sea at its south and Kep Municipality at its east.
  - 23010101 អំពេង Ampeng
  - 23010102 ទួលស្រង Tuol Srang
  - 23010103 កោះសោម Kaoh Saom
  - 23010104 អង្កោល Angkoul
- 230102 អូរក្រសារ Ou Krasar Commune
  - 23010201 អូរក្រសារ Ou Krasar
  - 23010202 ដំណាក់ចំបក់ Damnak Chambak
- 230103 ពងទឹក Pong Toek Commune
  - 23010301 អូរដូង Ou Doung
  - 23010302 ព្រៃតាកុយ Prey Ta Koy
  - 23010303 ភ្នំលាវ Phnom Leav
  - 23010304 រនេស Rones
  - 23010305 ចំការបី Chamkar Bei
