= Marine Conservation Cambodia =

Cambodian non-governmental organisation

- Abbreviation: MCC
- Formation: 2008
- Founder: Paul Ferber
- Type: Non-governmental organization
- Purpose: Marine conservation
- Location: Koh Ach Seh, Kep Province, Cambodia
- Website: www.marineconservationcambodia.org

Marine Conservation Cambodia (MCC) is a non-profit marine conservation organisation based in Koh Ach Seh, Kep archipelago.

== History ==
MCC was first established in 2008 in Koh Rong Samloem, by British conservationist Paul Ferber. MCC was one of the driving force behind the creation of Koh Rong Samloem's first ever conservation areas, with one area designated by the local community and legislated by national Fisheries Administration and one area designated by MCC and legislated by the local authorities. These areas were the start of Koh Rong Samloem's very first Zoning plans and the precursor to the current Marine Fisheries Management Area (MFMA), Cambodia's equivalent of Marine protected area.

In 2013, MCC was invited by the provincial government of Kep to begin work preparing for a second MFMA in Kep province. The organisation undertook marine surveys around Kep's 13 islands to monitor the coral reefs, seagrass beds and seahorse populations to assist the Provincial Authorities in the creation of the proposed MFMA. In March 2016, MCC submitted to local and national authorities a proposal of MFMA zoning plan for Kep Archipelago. In 2017, the proposal was approved and included in the Cambodian National Action Plan for Fisheries Conservation and the National Plan of Action for combating Illegal, Unreported, Unregulated fishing (IUU). In January 2018, the official 11,354-hectares map was accepted and signed by all provincial authorities, and on 12 April 2018, the New Marine Fisheries Management Area in Kep Province was finally approved and promulgated by the Minister of Agriculture, Forestry and Fisheries under the National Fisheries, Department of Conservation and with the support from Kep's Provincial Administration.

In April 2019, the Kep Archipelago was declared a Hope Spot by Sylvia Earle Alliance/Mission Blue, "in recognition of the impact that MCC’s conservation work has had in preserving the area’s unique seagrass meadows and sensitive marine species"

== Management of Kep Archipelago's MFMA ==
Kep's Marine Fisheries Management Area (MFMA) is the second in the country, and was created through a partnership between Cambodia's Ministry of Agriculture, Forestry and Fisheries, Kep province government, local fishing communities, and MCC. Encompassing the nine islands of the archipelago, the MFMA includes different zones with special regulations in order to protect the local ecosystem from Illegal, Unregulated, Unreported (IUU) fishing, which destroyed the majority of the local bivalve populations and seagrass meadows.

Two no-take zones have been established, one around Koh Ach Seh and another around Koh Angkrong, where only scientific research activities are allowed, with other activities such as fishing, anchoring and tourism strictly forbidden. Others protection zones include a refuge area near Koh Po where fishing is prohibited during specific times of the year, and two recreational research areas available for recreational diving and snorkelling, and for collecting scientific information. In the rest of the MFMA, subsistence fishing is still allowed, but all trawling and other types of intensive fishing are banned.

As part of the MFMA provincial technical Working Group and management committee, MCC's roles include demarcation and overfishing prevention, research and monitoring, restoration, community outreach and general support to the department of fisheries conservation on the application of MFMA 5-year management plan. In particular, MCC has been tasked with deploying 150 anti-trawling devices along the MFMA's boundaries.

These anti-trawling devices are made by the organisation on land, and are then placed on the seabed, preventing any illegal and destructive fishing as they catch, snare and entangle trawling nets. Besides acting as an anti-trawling device, the concrete hexagons/squares also act as artificial reefs and attract bivalves, sponges, barnacles and algae, which then in turn will attract organisms such as oysters and mussels, all of which naturally filters the water and therefore counter the threat of toxic algal blooms.

In June 2018, MCC's anti-trawling structures were awarded one of the first three National Geographic Society's Marine Protection Prize.

== Other research programs ==
Since its creation on Koh Rong Samloem, MCC has developed several research projects focusing on water quality and fish abundance, seahorses, marine mammals, coral reefs and seagrass beds. Besides its scientific projects, MCC has also tried throughout the years to raise awareness of marine ecology among local populations, engaging with fishing communities and establishing partnerships with local schools.

- Seahorse conservation

Four different species of seahorses have been identified within Cambodian waters. MCC's Seahorse conservation project aims to map seahorse species abundance and distribution in the Kep archipelago. MCC has been the first permanent marine conservation organisation in Cambodia to study seahorses, in partnership with Project Seahorse and the Cambodian Fisheries Department. These efforts resulted in including the specie in CITES endangered species for Cambodia.

- Cambodian Marine Mammal Conservation Project

The Cambodian Marine Mammal Conservation Project was implemented in September 2017 in collaboration with the national Fisheries Administration. The project's primary aim is to collect data on abundance, distribution and residency to delineate critical habitats for Kep's endangered Irrawaddy dolphin. Collected data will be used to design and implement dolphin conservation legislation for Kep province.

- Seagrass mapping and restoration

The Kep coastal waters used to host one of the most extensive seagrass meadows but it has been massively damaged by bottom trawling, and is still continuously threatened. The Seagrass Protection project aims to gather baseline knowledge of Seagrass beds in Cambodia's coastal waters, focusing on the province of Kep.

- Reef monitoring and restoration

Every year, MCC monitors the coral reefs of three strategic islands of Kep Archipelago in order to monitor corals, invertebrate and fish population. Species additions and removals are recorded to estimate ecosystem recovery.

== Partnerships ==
MCC has established different partnerships with both national and international organisations. These include:

- Royal University of Phnom Penh
- Paññāsāstra University of Cambodia
- Liger Leadership Academy
- Viet Nam Marine Megafauna Network
- International Conservation Fund of Canada
- National Geographic Society
- Heinrich Böll Foundation
- Waitt Foundation
- Idea Wild
- Sea of Change Foundation
- Plymouth Marine Laboratory
- National Oceanography Centre, Southampton
- Marine Mammal Protected Areas Task Force
- Ocean Conservancy
- Environmental Systems Research Institute
- Project Seahorse

== See also ==
- Marine conservation activism
- Sustainability
