= Bith =

Bith may refer to:

- Bith (Celtic mythology), a character from Goidelic Celtic mythology
- Bith (Star Wars), an alien race in Star Wars
- Sam Bith (1933–2008), a Cambodian Khmer Rouge commander
