= Prum Chantha =

Cambodian human rights activist

Prum Chantha (born c. 1978) is the leader of an activist mutual support group in Cambodia called the Friday Women, sometimes translated as the Friday Wives, who hold weekly public protests for the release of family jailed for political activities. Prum Chantha's husband Kak Komphear, a former Cambodia National Rescue Party (CNRP) official, has been in jail since June 2020 on conspiracy and incitement charges.

Starting in 2020 with a few protestors, the group has held over 150 peaceful public protests and grown to up to 20 protestors each time who protest and deliver petitions. The protestors have been threatened with arrests and violently harassed with intimidation extending to family members and employers.

== Arrest of autistic son ==
On June 24, 2021, Prum Chantha's home was raided by police and her 16-year-old autistic son Kak Sovannchhay was arrested on charges of insulting government leaders on social media following posts on the messaging app Telegram in a group chat. He was sentenced to 11 months imprisonment on 1 November 2021 at the same prison Prey Sar where his father is also serving time. Kak Sovannchhay was released five months later on November 10, 2021. His arrest as a disabled minor received international news coverage.

Kak Sovannchhay had previously been arrested and beaten in October 2020 for gathering discarded material that included political items, and in April 2021 suffered a skull fracture after being attacked while on a motorbike by an unknown assailant.

== Personal life ==
Chantha is married to Kak Komphear, a former CNRP official in prison for political activities, and they have one son. She works as a trader in a family business.
