= Chhouk Rin =

Khmer Rouge commander

Chhouk Rin is a former Khmer Rouge commander. He was sentenced to life imprisonment for the murder of three tourists, Australian David Wilson, 29, Briton Mark Slater, 28, and Frenchman Jean-Michel Braquet, 27 at Phnom Voar in 1994. In 2005, he escaped to Phnom Penh where he evaded capture because he believed that Sam Bith and Nuon Paet are the guilty ones. After he was captured, he lost an appeal to overturn the ruling that sentenced him to life imprisonment in Prey Sar prison.
