= Koh Seh =

Cambodian island in the Gulf of Thailand

Native name: កោះសេះ
- Location within Cambodia

Geography
- Location: Cambodia - Southeast Asia
- Coordinates: 10°25′N 103°48′E
- Area: 7.5 km^{2} (2.9 sq mi)
- Length: 4.4 km (2.73 mi)
- Width: 1.8–4.4 km (1.1–2.7 mi)
- Coastline: 15 km (9.3 mi)
- Highest point: meters

Administration
- Cambodia
- Province: Sihanoukville
- City: Kampong Saom

Demographics
- Ethnic groups: Khmer

Koh Seh (Khmer: កោះសេះ, also romanized as Kaoh Seh and its former French name Ile a l'eau) is a Cambodian island located in the Gulf of Thailand, inside Ream National Park, Sihanoukville province. It lies 1.5 km (1 mi) south of Koh Thmei and around 9 km (6 mi) south of the main-land of Sihanoukville's Ream commune. A 4.3 km (3 mi) wide sound separates it from Phu Quoc. "Koh Seh" means Horse Island. Less than 400 meters south-west of Koh Seh lies the tiny islet of Koh Ky.

Koh Seh is uninhabited while most of its shores are fringed with mangroves. The island constitutes the south-easternmost part of Ream National Park.

Koh Seh is sometimes mistaken with Koh Ach Seh, located in Kep Archipelago.

== See also ==
- Koh Thmei
- Ream National Park
- Koh Rong Sanloem
- Koh Rong
- Koh Sdach
- List of islands of Cambodia
- List of Cambodian inland islands
- Sihanoukville
