= Koh Thmei =

Cambodian island in the Gulf of Thailand

Native name: កោះថ្មី
- Location within Cambodia

Geography
- Location: Cambodia - South East Asia
- Coordinates: 10°29′N 103°45′E
- Area: 40 km^{2} (15 sq mi)
- Length: 8.8 km (5.47 mi)
- Width: 5.1–7.5 km (3.2–4.7 mi)
- Coastline: 28.5 km (17.71 mi)

Administration
- Cambodia
- Province: Sihanoukville
- City: Kampong Saom

Demographics
- Population: less than 200
- Ethnic groups: Khmer

Koh Thmei ("New Island", Khmer: កោះថ្មី, former French name: Ile du Milieu), is an island of Cambodia, situated in the Gulf of Thailand, immediately south-east of the Sihanoukville headland. Although clearly inside the protected area of Ream National Park, a number of development companies have obtained long lasting land-lease concessions since 2010. Announced were large-scale plans, including a bridge to the mainland. By August 2014 the island hasn't yet undergone any alterations. In early 2018, development hastened on the island, partly prompted by the launch of the Golden Silver Gulf Tourism Zone project, which encompasses Koh Thmei.

== Geography ==
Koh Thmei and neighboring island Koh Seh comprise the eastern third of the Ream National Park, situated in the South-East corner of Prey Nob District, Sihanoukville province. At the narrowest point, due west, the island is a mere 300 meters off the mainland. Yet all transports arrives via the Prek Toek Sap estuary from Koh K'chhang fishing village to the north, a distance of around 3 km. Roughly pentagonal shaped with four sides of similar length, a shorter and rugged fifth side in the South, the inner coastline is dominated by extensive mangrove marshes. Along the sea-facing coast, sizable beaches can be found, littered with shells, the sands of rather coarse composition. Still, due to the unspoiled, pristine state, dense, lush and primeval vegetation, its general remoteness and very sparse population, Koh Thmei is considered one of the most ecologically esteemed Cambodian islands among its visitors. The island's center is roughly the highest point with two main peaks, separated by a river {Prek Koh Krabei}. The peaks rise to over 100 meters and drain in all directions, lending Koh Thmei the shape of a gentle mountain. The island's moderate elevation enables it to retain enough water for a few little rivers, creeks and estuaries.

== Settlements and infrastructure ==
Unsurprisingly for an island inside a national park, human settlements are few and population numbers low. Taly Village sits at the south-eastern coast, Chong Thmei Village - the biggest settlement - lies in the North-East and the island's only Bungalow resort in the West. A small farming settlement, featuring Koh Thmei Eco Adventure Resort sits on the western coast. There is also a weather station at Chong Thmei. Dirt - or sealed roads and regular motor vehicles do not exist, transport hubs are local boat piers.

== Legal status of the national park ==
A wide range of groups and individuals have converging and diverging interests or stakes in the park’s resources. Park authorities have to deal daily with all stakeholders. Consensus is not always possible since the resources of the park can only support limited levels of exploitation. In 2011 lawmakers issued a "law update" on Ream and other protected areas, stating: "The land area of 84.5 hectares of the “Ream” National Park Zone shall be determined as a community area located in Ream commune, Prey Nub district of Preah Sihanouk province. Any issuance of land title certificate in this community area shall be required to obtain a prior approval from the Ministry of Environment in compliance with the Land Law."
In 2016, Yeejia Tourism Development Co Ltd, a subsidiary of Chinese-owned firm Unite International (Cambodia) Investment Group Co Ltd, signed memoranda of understanding with more than a dozen mostly Chinese companies to develop and supply services to its Golden Silver Gulf resort project. At the same time, gaming junket operator Jimei International Entertainment Group Ltd announced separately in a filing to the Hong Kong Stock Exchange a framework agreement with Yeejia to jointly develop an “entertainment resort complex, including property, hotel, golf course, theme park and other entertainment and tourism business”.
According to Royal Government of Cambodia sub-Decrees No. 150, dated November 2, 2018, more than two thousand hectares of land on Koh Thmei were earmarked as development zones for tourist, entertainment and recreational centres. HTTH Island Investment Co. and Celestial Stars Limited, a casino and lottery company, would develop the areas to tap into the growth of coastal tourism in Cambodia.

== Wildlife ==
While Koh Thmei is part of, constitutes and contributes to the local eco-system, literally all sources first highlight the exceptional high number of bird species on the island.

Hanuman travel - a useful place to base to sight some of the island’s 155 bird species, including the endangered brahminy kite.

Travelfish: Koh Thmei is the habitat of many types of interesting wildlife, particularly birds. Over 150 types of birds make their home in the park and a trip to the island offers ample bird-watching opportunities.

CNN: Located inside Ream National Park, Koh Thmei is home to monkeys, civets, lizards, more than 100 different species of birds and several threatened species, including the fishing cat, a wetland feline than makes its home near streams and mangrove forests.

== See also ==
- Koh Rong Sanloem
- Koh Seh
- Koh Sdach
- Ream National Park
- List of islands of Cambodia
- List of Cambodian inland islands
- Sihanoukville (city)
