= Kep (town) =

Kep ក្រុងកែប Krong Kaeb
- City Municipality
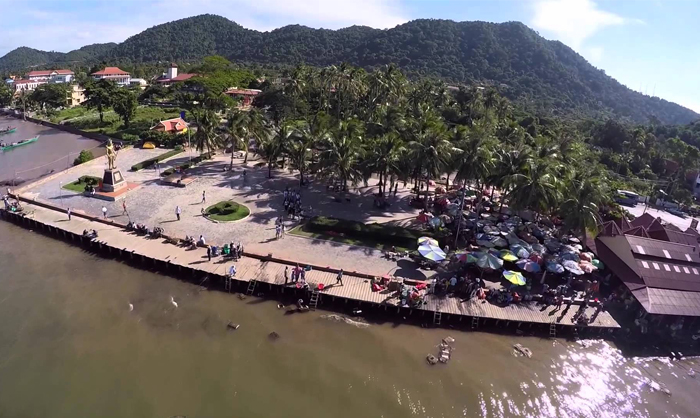
- The kep crab market
- Nickname: Côte de la perle d'Agathe (pre-1970s)
- Location within Cambodia
- Coordinates: 10°29′15″N 104°19′15″E
- Country: Cambodia
- Province: Kep
- Municipality: Kep

Population (2019)
  - Total: 35,990
- Time zone: UTC+7 (ICT)
- Website: https://kampot.city/kep

Kep (ក្រុងកែប), or Krong Kaeb, is the capital of Kep Province in southern Cambodia. It lies near Kep National Park. The small city has a population of 35,990 as of 2019. The city is home to many abandoned villas left from by the French Colonial authorities and the elites of Cambodia during the 70s due to the Khmer Civil War and the Khmer Rouge.

== Climate ==
Climate data for Kep (1982–2024)
| Month | Jan | Feb | Mar | Apr | May | Jun | Jul | Aug | Sep | Oct | Nov | Dec | Year |
|---|---|---|---|---|---|---|---|---|---|---|---|---|---|
| Mean daily maximum °C (°F) | 31.6 (88.9) | 32.4 (90.3) | 32.6 (90.7) | 33.1 (91.6) | 33.5 (92.3) | 32.9 (91.2) | 32.0 (89.6) | 31.7 (89.1) | 31.9 (89.4) | 31.5 (88.7) | 31.3 (88.3) | 30.9 (87.6) | 32.1 (89.8) |
| Mean daily minimum °C (°F) | 21.6 (70.9) | 22.9 (73.2) | 23.6 (74.5) | 24.1 (75.4) | 24.7 (76.5) | 24.5 (76.1) | 24.0 (75.2) | 23.7 (74.7) | 24.0 (75.2) | 23.7 (74.7) | 23.4 (74.1) | 22.3 (72.1) | 23.5 (74.4) |
| Average precipitation mm (inches) | 19.4 (0.76) | 20.0 (0.79) | 76.7 (3.02) | 89.3 (3.52) | 107.6 (4.24) | 136.3 (5.37) | 197.6 (7.78) | 297.9 (11.73) | 200.7 (7.90) | 106.5 (4.19) | 92.0 (3.62) | 26.4 (1.04) | 1,370.4 (53.96) |
Source: World Meteorological Organization
