= Koh Tonsay =

Cambodian island in the Gulf of Thailand

Koh Tonsay កោះទន្សាយ (Khmer) Rabbit Island
- Island
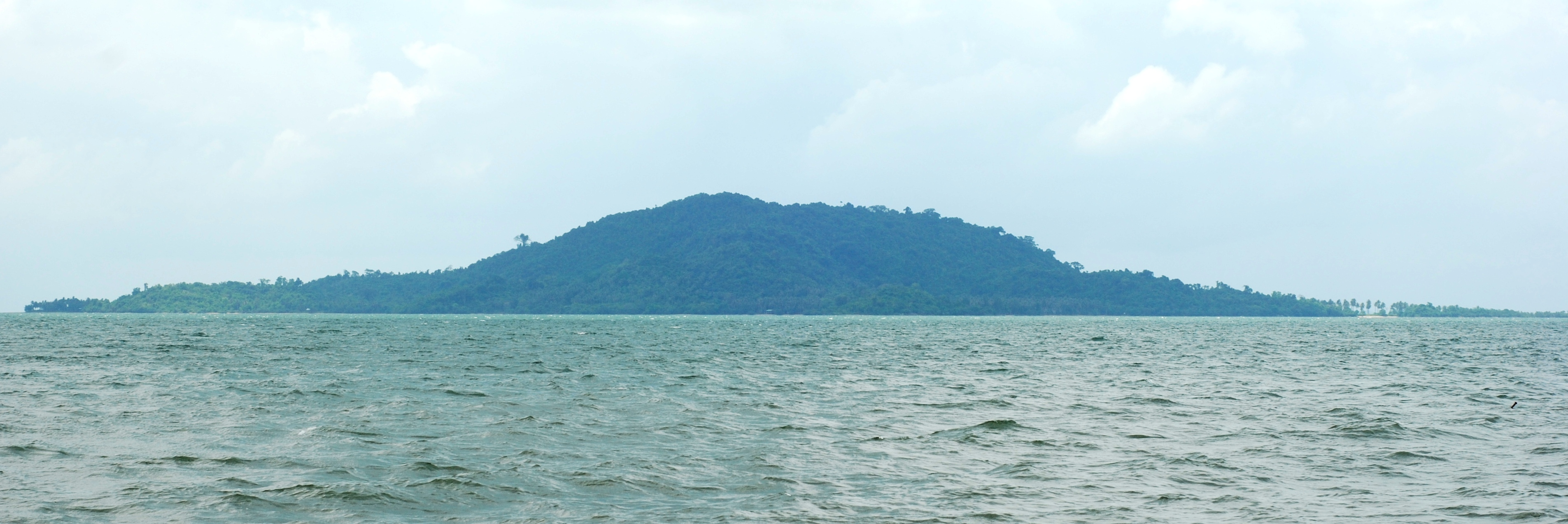
- Koh Tonsay Island

- Location within Cambodia
- Coordinates: 10°26′8″N 104°19′37″E
- Country: Cambodia
- Province: Kep

Area
  - Total: 2 km^{2} (0.77 sq mi)
  - Land: 2 km^{2} (0.77 sq mi)
- Time zone: UTC+7 (ICT)

Koh Tonsay (Khmer: កោះទន្សាយ) is a Cambodian island located off the country's southern coast in the Gulf of Thailand. "Koh Tonsay" translates to Rabbit Island, it is being administered by Kep Province.

Koh Tonsay is located just 4 km (2 mi) south of Kep town, has an area of around 2 km^{2} (1 sq mi) and can be reached by ferry boat from the local port. The island is open for visitors and tourists, who value white sand beaches and the marine scenery. The surrounding sea is shallow, the sea bed gradually sloping, excellent for recreational activities. A number of coral reefs and a variety of habitats for animals and plants attract researchers and ecologists.

During Norodom Sihanouk's Sangkum Reastr Niyum regime (1953 to 1970), the island was a rehabilitation center for convicted criminals, who were in turn used to defend the island. Horse cart paths and wooden, thatched roof hotels were also constructed during this time. Most of this infrastructure has been destroyed by weather and decades of war.

Currently there are individually built and run guest houses on the main beach, attracting Cambodian and foreign tourists. Local settlers - fishermen and their families also live on the island, occupying other beaches around the shoreline.

In September 2021, the Try Pheap Koh Tunsay Resorts company owned by Cambodian tycoon Try Pheap began construction of a 144 hectare project on Koh Tonsay. The company was awarded a concession for 50 years to develop the island in 2019. The company has pledged to maintain 60 per cent forest cover on the island.

== Etymology ==
Tonsay (ទន្សាយ) is derived from the word "rumsay" (រំសាយ, "discharge"). While trying to avoid the commander's troops, Khmer prince Sakor Reach grew hopeless because his troops were exhausted. He led his remaining troops across the sea to an island in front of Kep city, where the troops spread out. Accordingly, the island was called Koh Rumsay (កោះរំសាយ), the name underwent a transformation towards Koh Tonsay (កោះទន្សាយ), as it is known today.

== Images ==
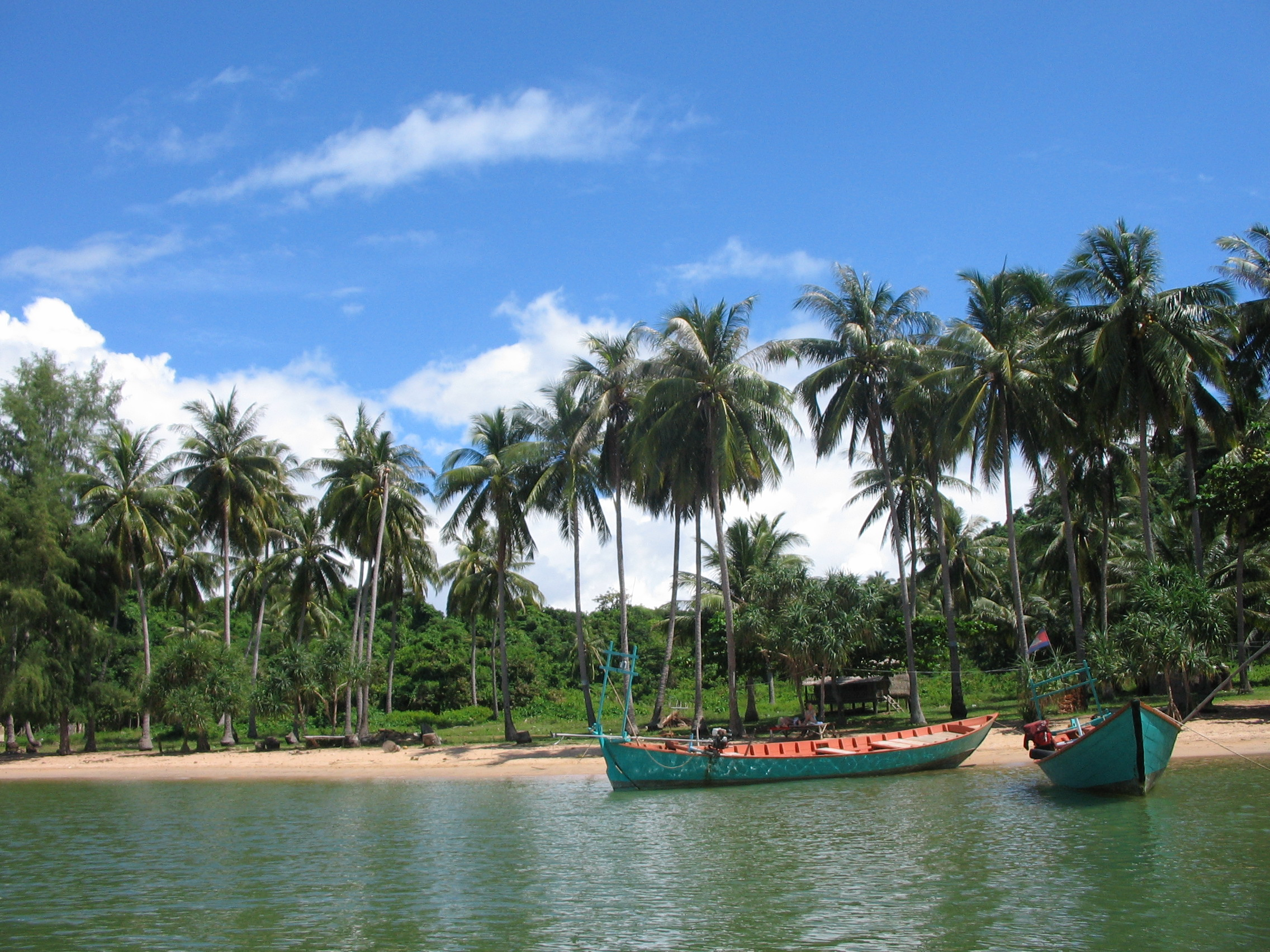
Boats on a Sandy Beach

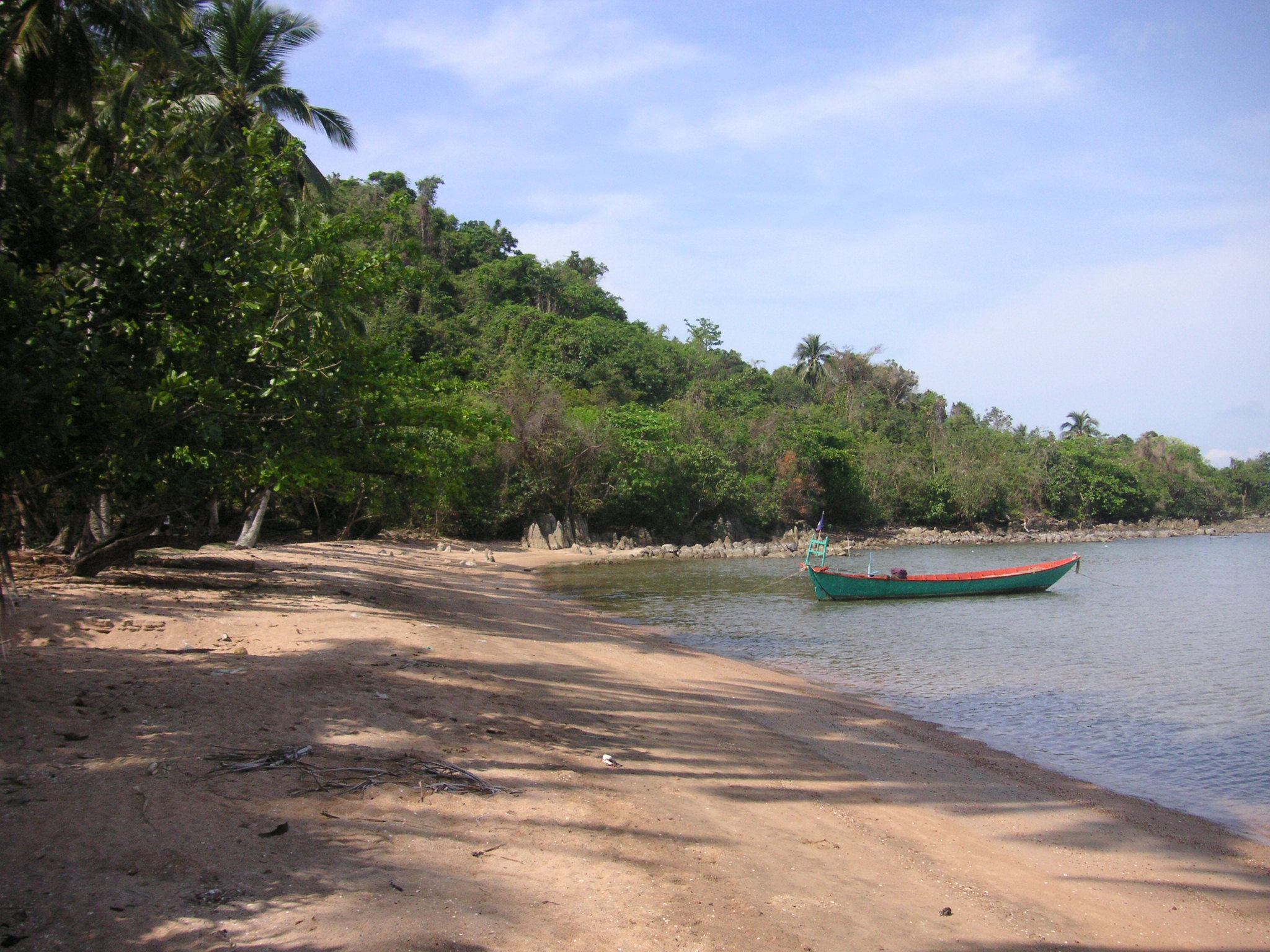
A Beach on Koh Tonsay

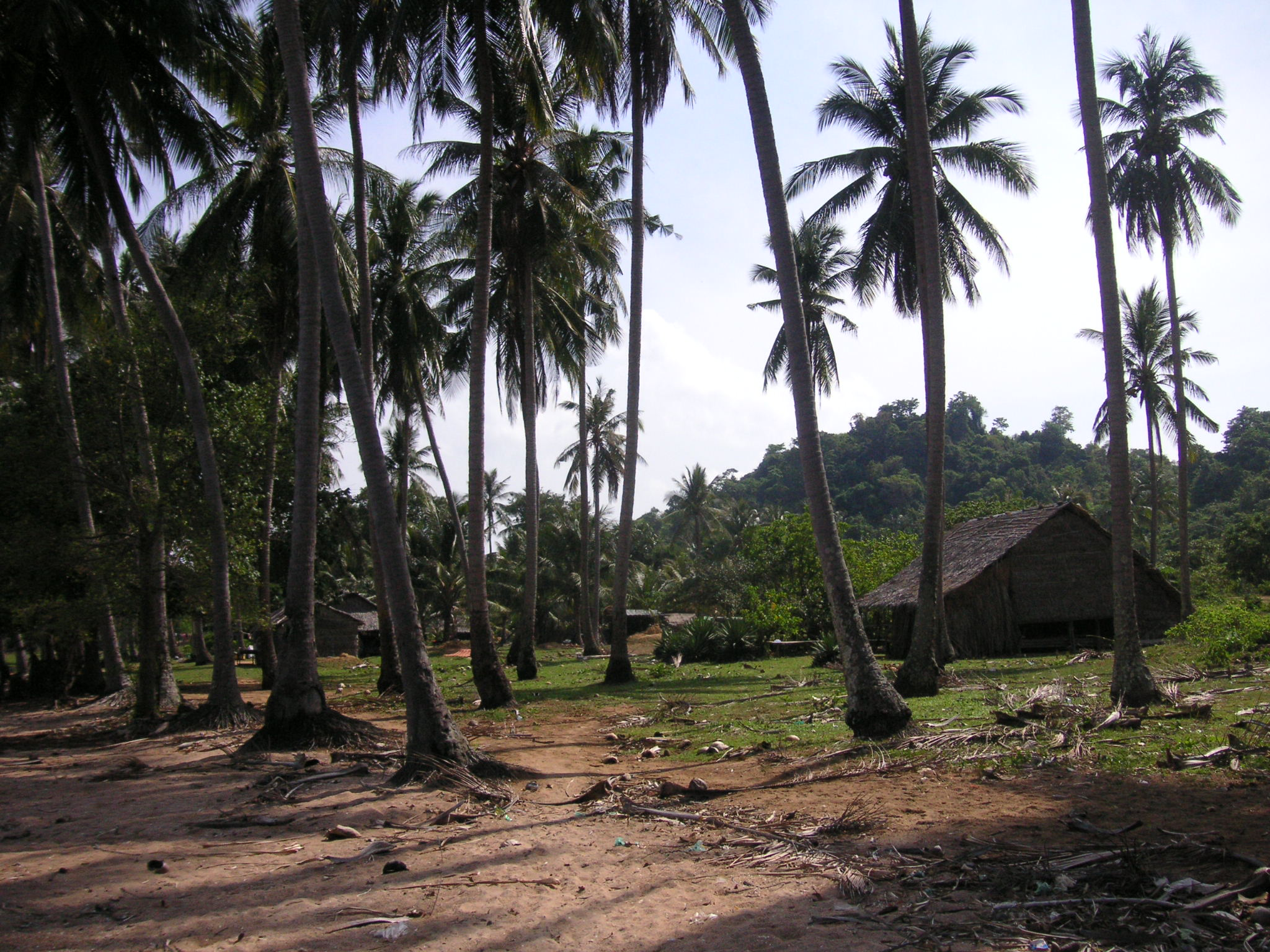
Palm Trees on the Island

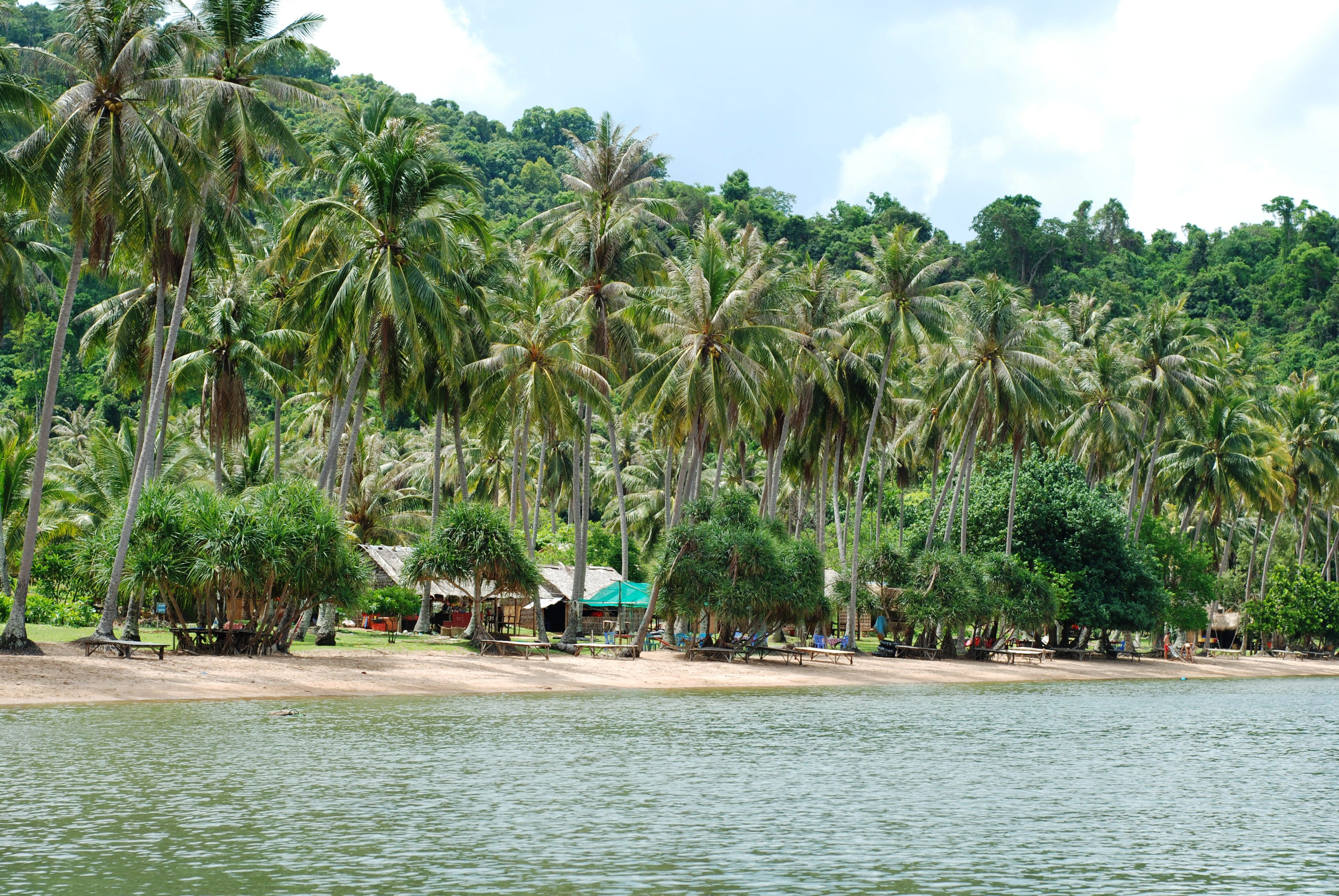
Koh Tonsay's Main Beach

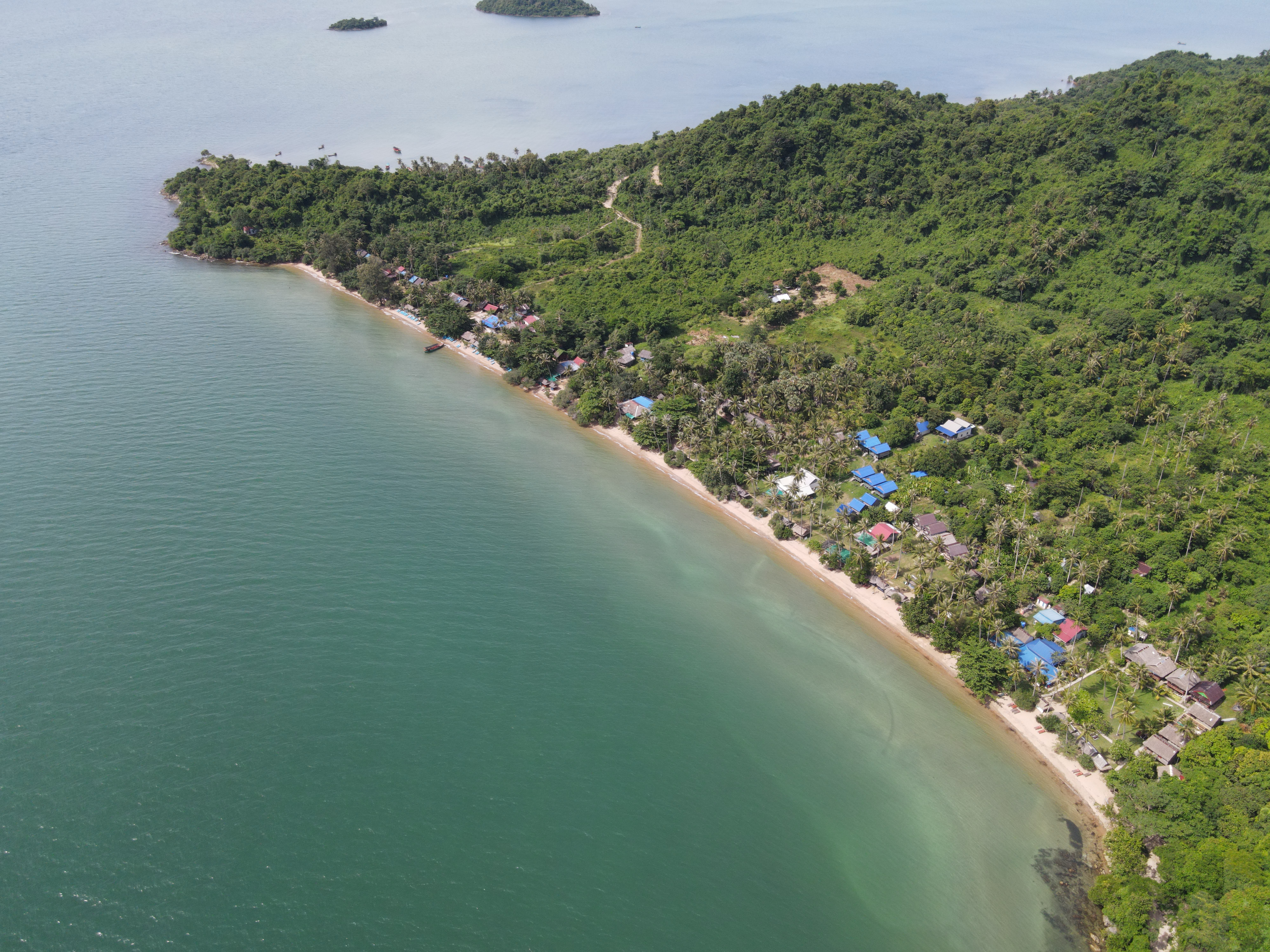
Beach at Koh Tonsay

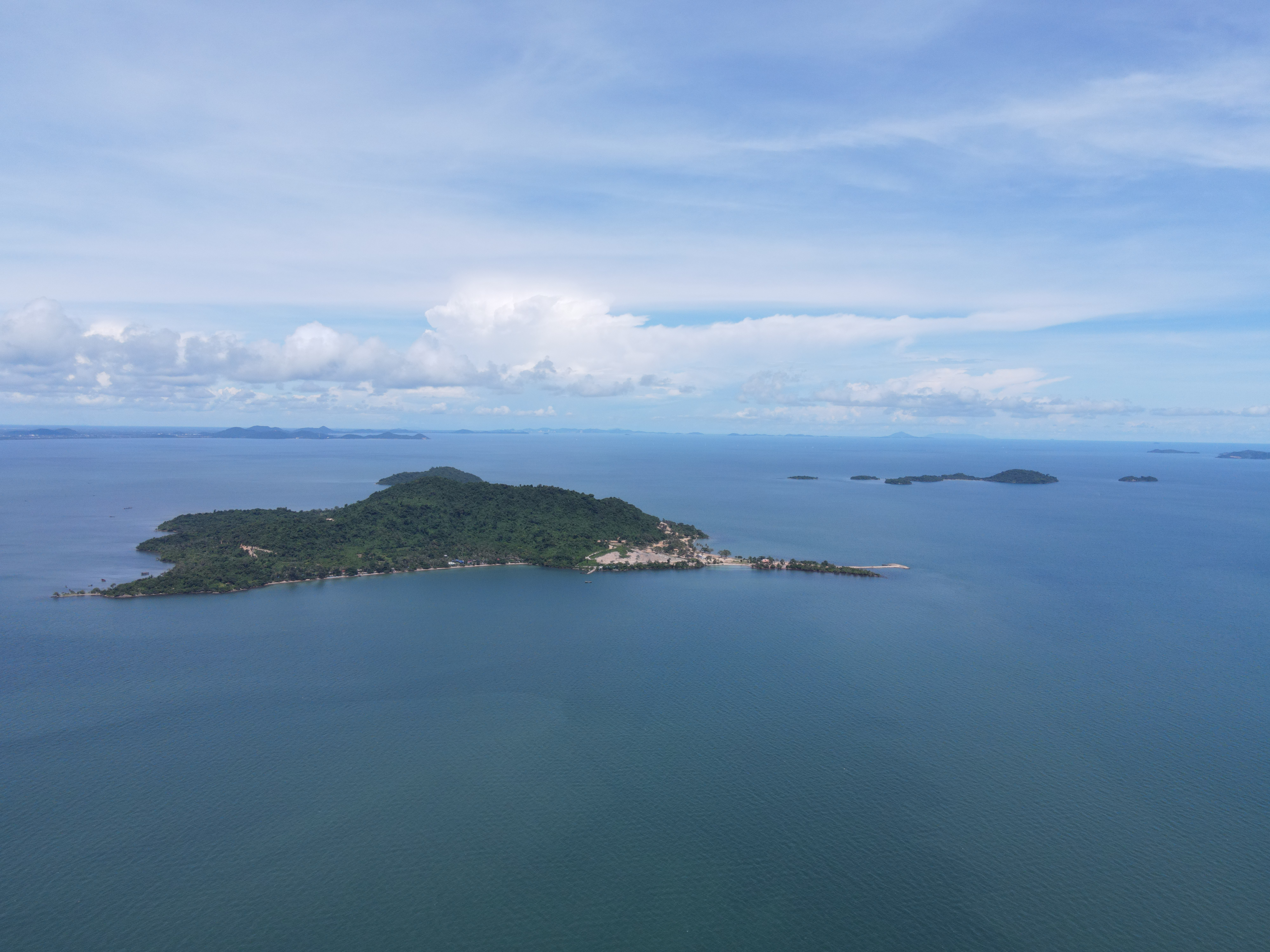
Aerial view of Koh Tonsay

== See also ==
- List of islands of Cambodia
