= Sam Bith =

- Born: Sam Bith; May 1, 1933; Cambodia
- Died: February 15, 2008 (aged 74); Cambodia
- Convictions: kidnapping, conspiring in premeditated murder, terrorism and robbery

Sam Bith (May 1, 1933 – February 15, 2008) was a Cambodian guerrilla commander, convicted murderer for Khmer Rouge, and former deputy to its military head Ta Mok.

On July 26, 1994, Bith and his fleet of rebels ambushed a train carrying the three backpackers – Australian David Wilson, Briton Mark Slater and Frenchman Jean-Michel Braquet, with at least ten Cambodians being killed in the attack itself. The group held the three foreigners and several Cambodians under "miserable conditions" at Vine Mountain rebel base in the southern Cambodian province of Kampot. They were killed three months after the attack when government-backed negotiations for their release and the $150,000 ransom failed.

Fellow rebel Nuon Paet was sentenced to life in prison for his role in it in June 1999. In his trial, he testified against Bith, claiming that Bith, his superior officer, ordered them killed. By the time the manhunt began that same year Bith was a general in the Royal Cambodian Army after defecting from the Khmer Rouge in 1996.

Bith was found following the publication in a Thai newspaper of reports of his lavish home in Pailin in western Cambodia. He was charged with kidnapping, conspiring in premeditated murder, terrorism and robbery in December 2002 and was sentenced to life in prison. Bith pleaded innocent to those charges, claiming in court he had already been relieved of his position as a regional commander by Khmer Rouge leader Pol Pot several weeks before the train ambush. He had been suffering from health problems the day before his arrest and two doctors had been assigned to look over him.

Bith died on February 15, 2008, aged 74. While no official cause of death has been given, his wife Khem Ri said he had been "very sick" with diabetes and high blood pressure and had been taken to Calmette Hospital ten days beforehand. Sam Bith is buried in a Chinese cemetery in Battambang, in accordance with his Sino-Khmer roots.
