= Kep National Park =

Cambodian national park

- ឧទ្យានជាតិកែប
- IUCN category II (national park)
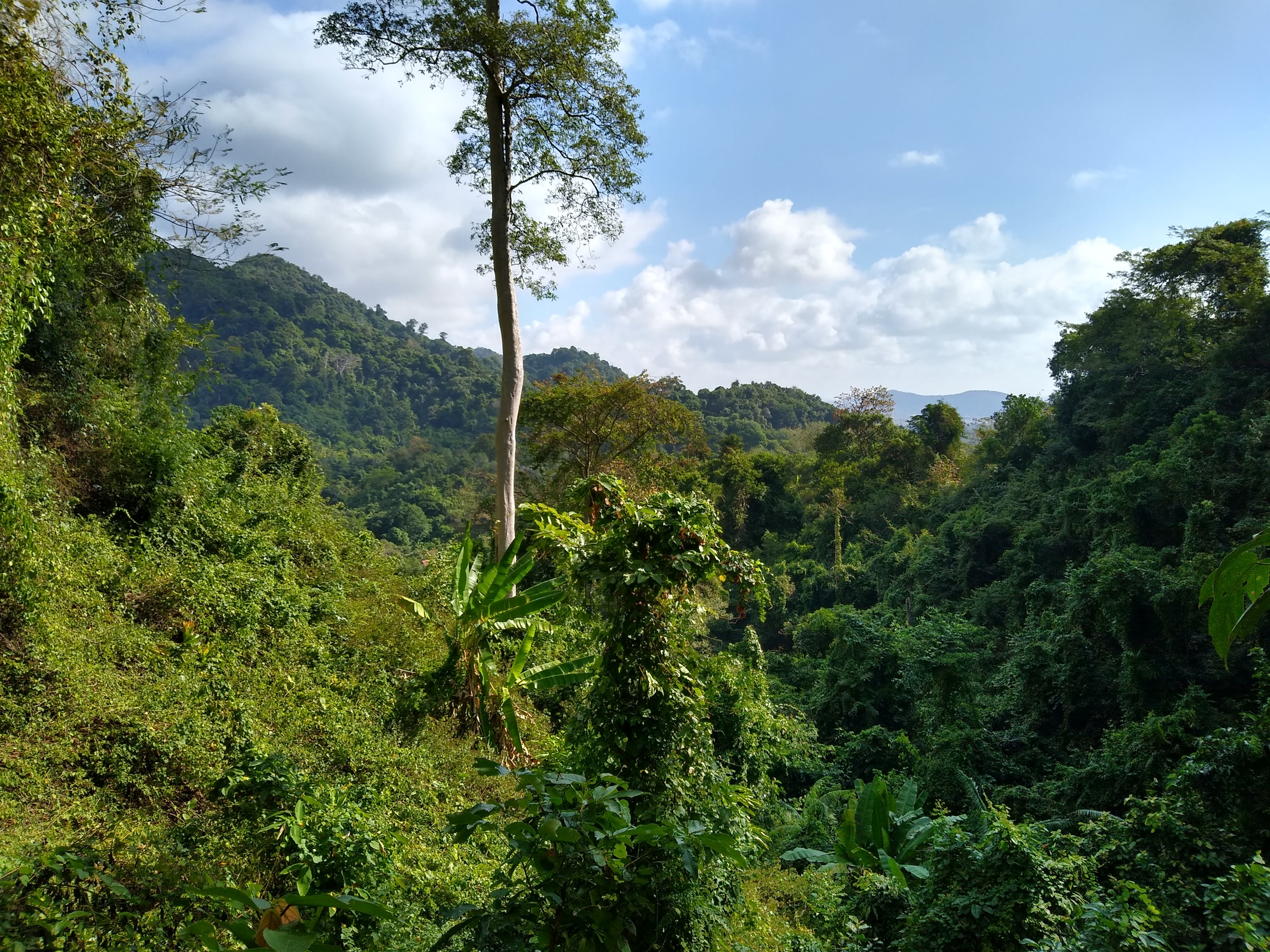

- Location within Cambodia
- Location: Kep Province, Cambodia
- Nearest city: Kep
- Coordinates: 10.50614988°N 104.30800459°E
- Area: 11.52 km^{2} (4.45 sq mi)
- Established: 1993

Kep National Park (Khmer: ឧទ្យានជាតិកែប) is a national park in Cambodia's Kep Province that was established in 1993 and encompasses an area of 11.52 km^{2} (4.45 sq mi). It includes a small mountain range and offers views of Phu Quoc and the Bokor Ranges on the south and west sides, and also views across islands of the Vietnamese marine reserve in Kiên Giang to the east side.
