= Kampong Trach District =

Kampong Trach ស្រុកកំពង់ត្រាច
- District (srok)
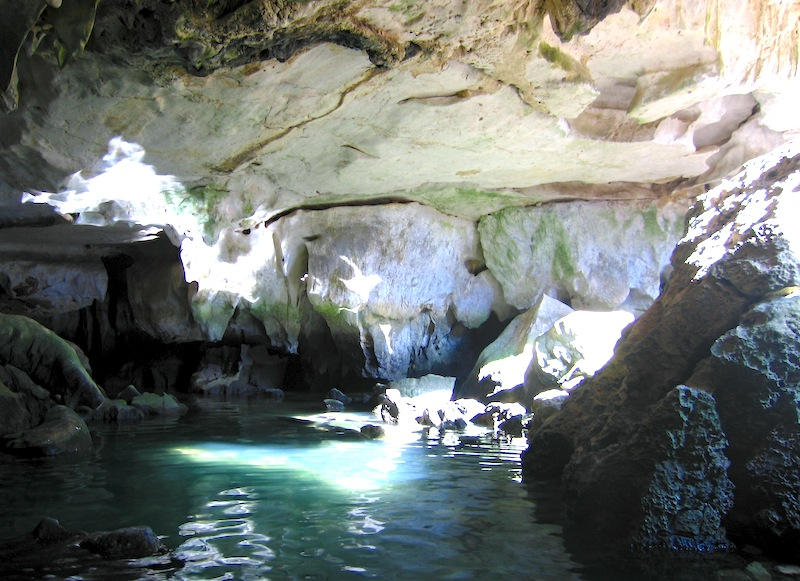
- A cave in Kampong Trach

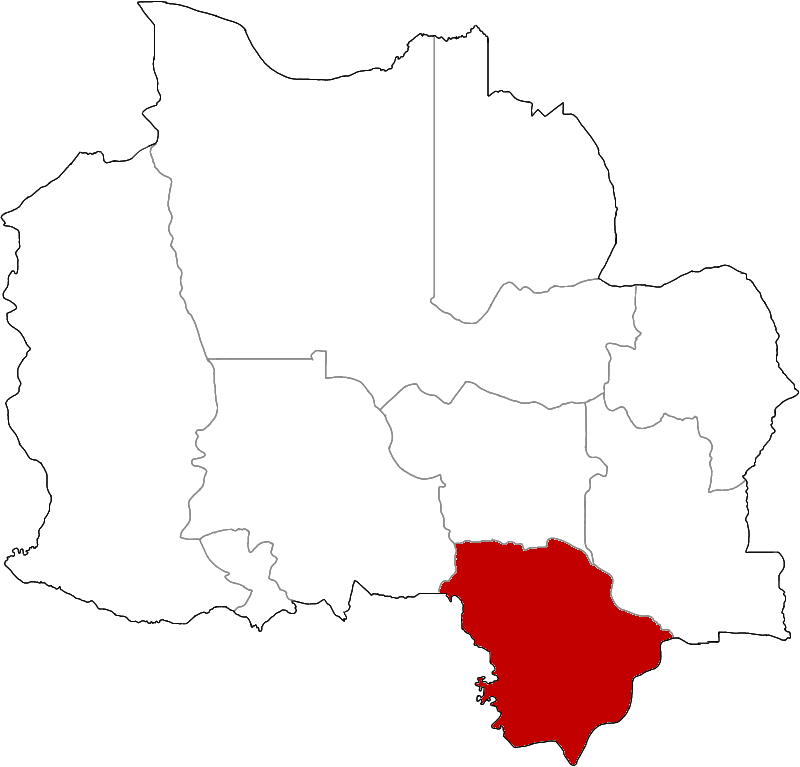
- District location in Kampot Province
- Coordinates: 10°33′N 104°28′E
- Country: Cambodia
- Province: Kampot
- Communes: 16
- Villages: 69

Population (1998)
  - Total: 83,061
- Time zone: +7
- Geocode: 0706

Kampong Trach District (Khmer: ស្រុកកំពង់ត្រាច) is one of 8 districts in Kampot Province and it is located at the eastern part bordering Vietnam to the east, Banteay Meas District to the north, Kep Province to the west and the Gulf of Thailand to the south.

Anlong Pring Crane Reserve is a small protected area in Kampong Trach near the Vietnamese border on the edge of the Mekong Delta. Sarus cranes nest in the dry forest north of here in the wet season. During the dry season, a few hundred of these cranes take up residence at this reserve. The reserve is an IBA protection at 217 hectares, established on 6 January 2011. There is a similar sanctuary in the adjacent Takéo Province since 2007.

A road border crossing into Vietnam is located in this district. The border crossing is called the Prek Chak International Border Checkpoint. The checkpoint on the Vietnamese side is called Ha Tien International Border Gate. The nearest Vietnamese town to the border crossing is Ha Tien.

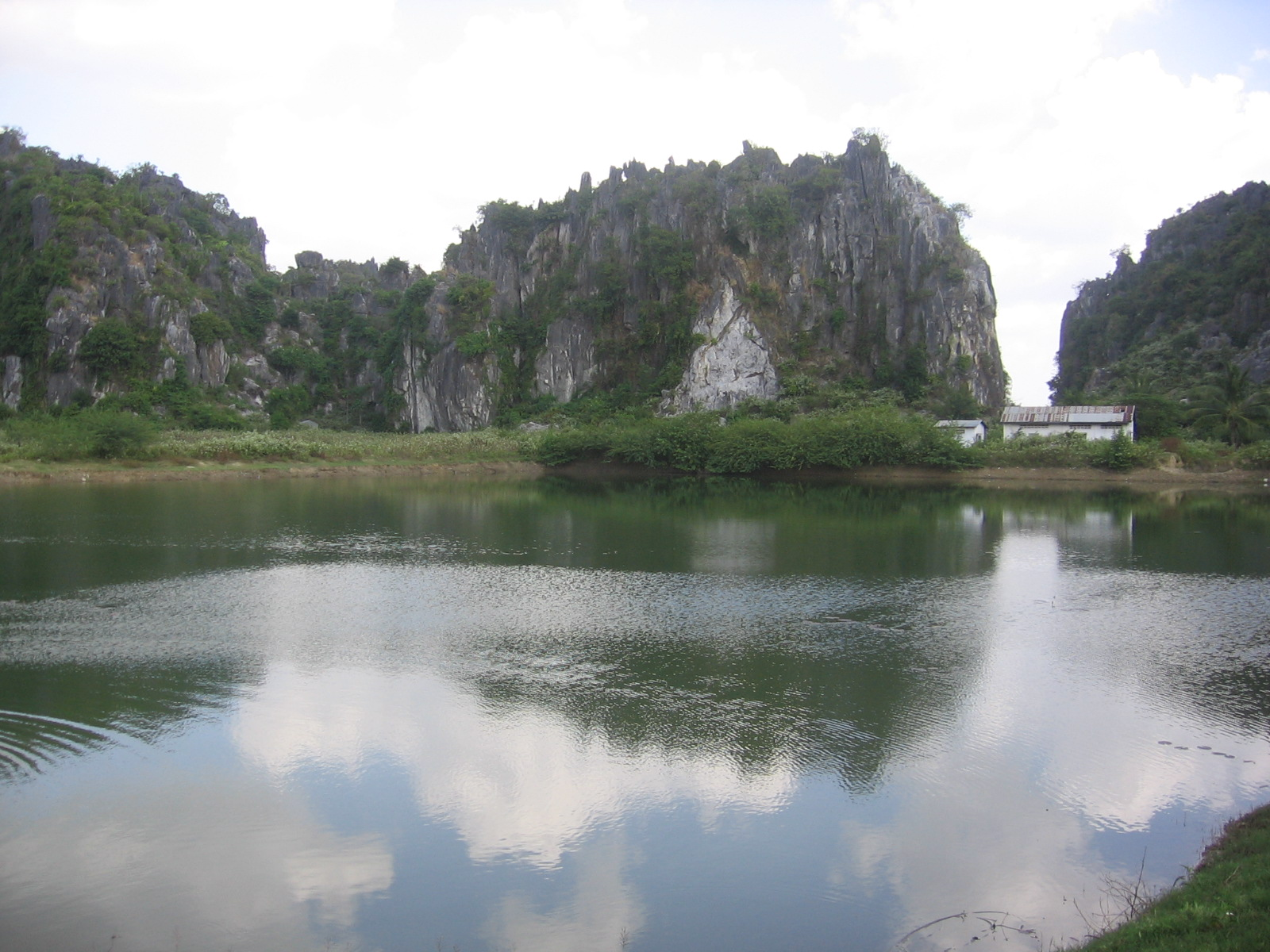
Weathered mountains with cave systems
