= Ream National Park =

National park in Preah Sihanouk Province, Cambodia

- Preah Sihanouk Ream National Park
- IUCN category II (national park)
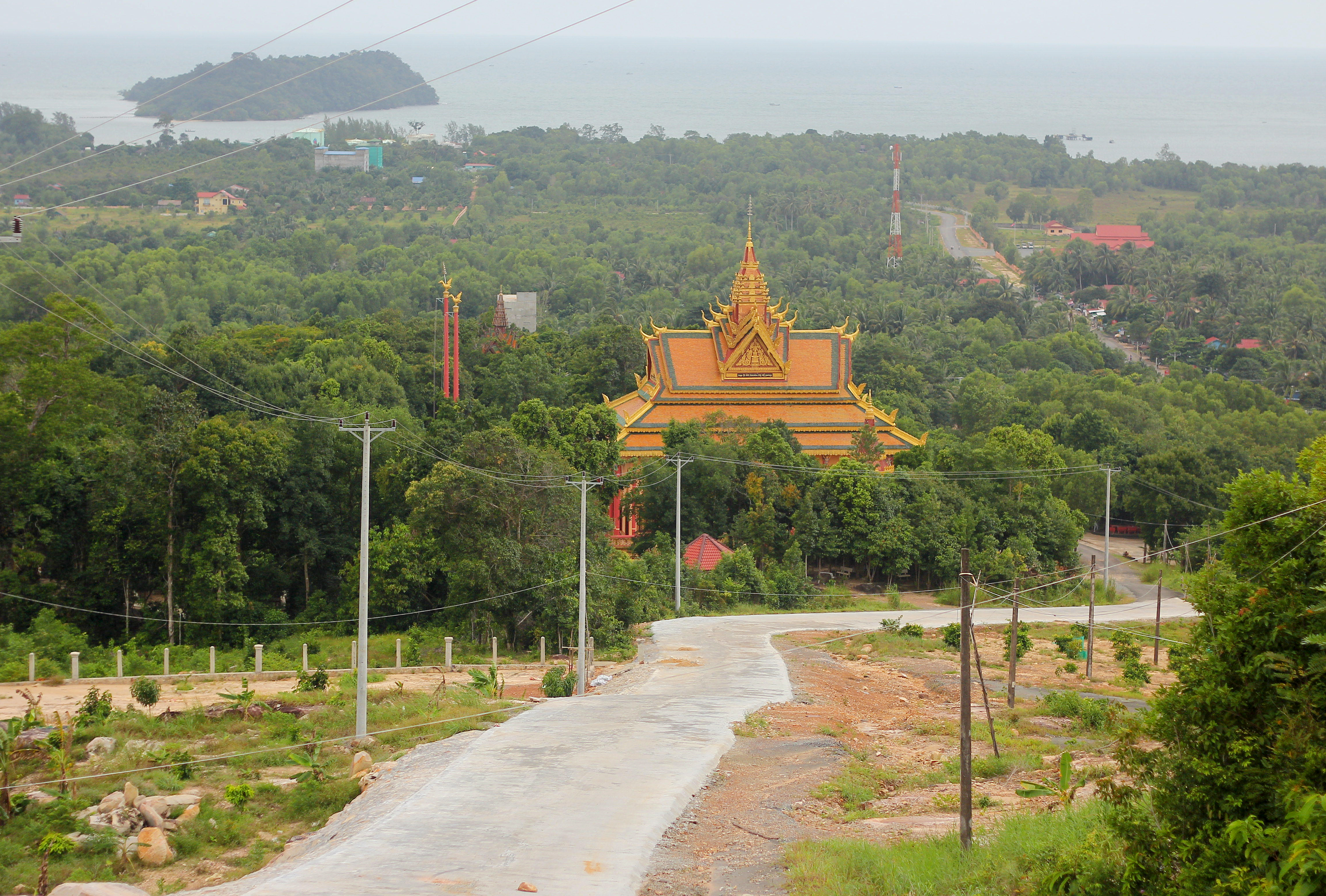

- Location within Cambodia
- Location: Cambodia
- Nearest city: Sihanoukville
- Coordinates: 10°30′23″N 103°44′04″E
- Area: 146.76 km^{2} (56.66 sq mi)
- Established: 1993
- Governing body: Ministry of Environment, Department B
- Website: www.moe.gov.kh

The Ream National Park (Khmer: ឧទ្យានជាតិរាម), officially the Preah Sihanouk Ream National Park (Khmer: ឧទ្យានជាតិព្រះសីហនុរាម), is a national park of Cambodia located 18 km (11 mi) from the city of Sihanoukville in the Sihanoukville Municipality of the Sihanoukville Province in southwestern Cambodia. It was established in 1993, as the Cambodian government began to take action for the protection of the country's threatened natural resources. The national park's biological value is defined by its combination of rivers, forests, mangroves, estuaries, beaches, coral reefs, wildlife, and marine life.

== Geography ==
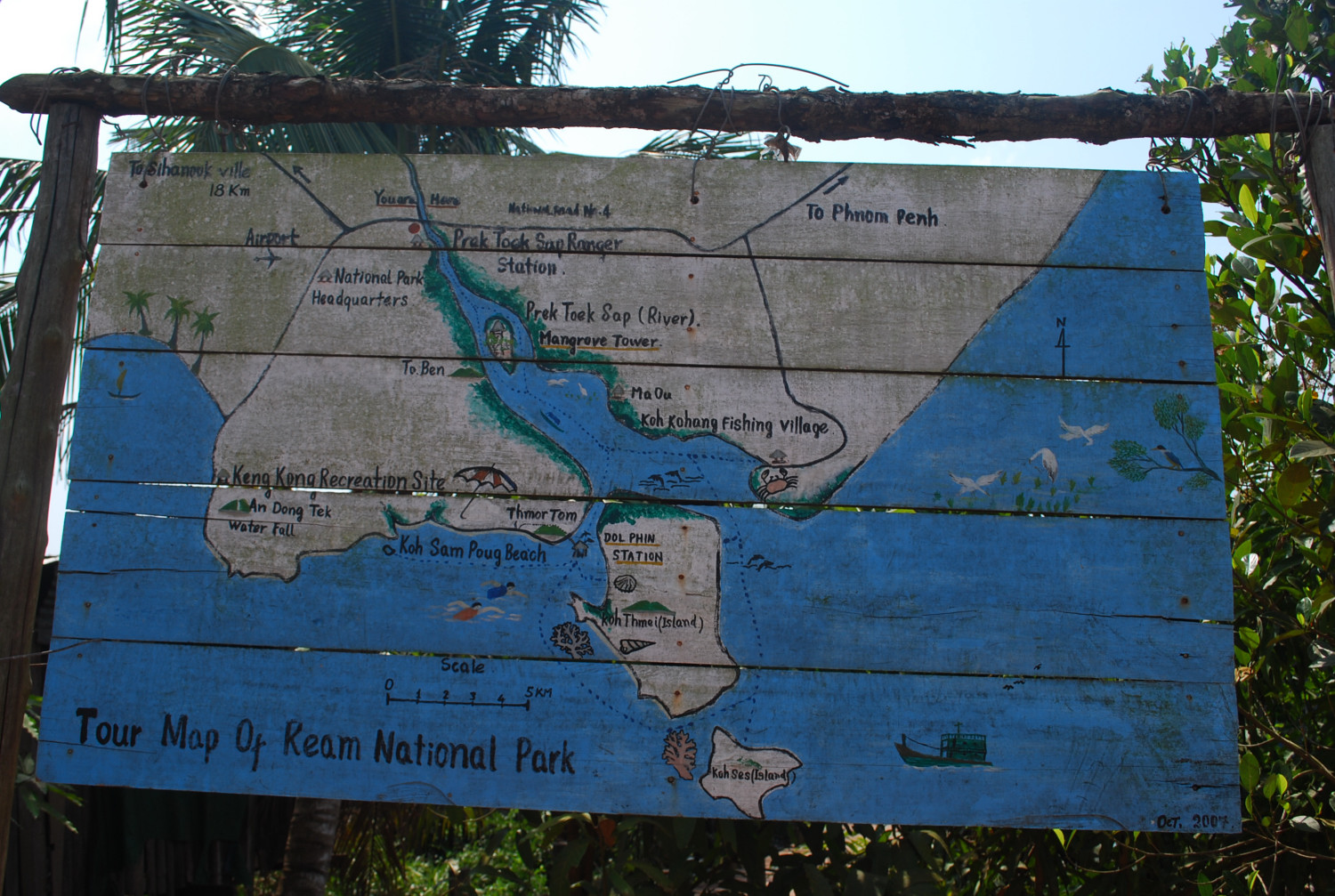
Tour map of Ream National Park

Ream National Park constitutes the south-east of Prey Nob district of the Sihanoukville Province bordering the Gulf of Thailand. The park encompasses 210 km^{2} (81 sq mi), divided into 150 km^{2} (58 sq mi) of terrestrial and 60 km^{2} (23 sq mi) of marine habitats. The landscape of the park is mountainous with a range of habitats and ecosystems including mangrove forests, freshwater wetlands, sea grass beds, evergreen forests, beaches, coral reefs, rivers, and islands. The park is divided by a freshwater river called the Prek Teuk Sap, which flows through the park to the ocean. Land to the west of the river is dominated by two larger hills. These hills are separated by the Prek Sampouch watercourse. Located on the most western side of the park is Phnom Mollou. At a height of 277 m (909 ft), it is the highest peak within the park. The other hill rises to a height of 196 m (643 ft). Between the hills and the estuary of the Prek Teuk Sap lies a narrow discontinuous belt of wetlands. These wetlands are protected by an even thinner band of degraded mangrove forest. The islands of Koh Thmei and Koh Seh comprise the eastern third of the park.

== Natural resources ==
Wildlife found or reported in the national park includes, but is not limited to: rhesus monkeys, dugongs, turtles, dolphins, mouse-deer, Sarus crane, and pelicans. Vegetation habitats of the park include lowland evergreen forest, melaleuca forests, and mangrove forest. Despite all this, the National Park is a substantial local economic resource. Almost 30,000 people or 5,500 households live in the five communes that overlap or border Ream National Park, and population growth rates are estimated at nearly 3%. Four of these communes are located on the boundary of Ream, and a total of 13 villages have land lying within the Park's boundaries.

== Legal status ==
A wide range of groups and individuals have converging and diverging interests or stakes in the park's resources. Park authorities have to deal daily with all stakeholders. Consensus is not always possible since the resources of the park can only support limited levels of exploitation. Stakeholders are: local communities, commercial loggers, police, The Navy, Ministry of Environment, Rangers, United Nations Development Programme, land speculators, commercial fishermen, and tourists. In 2011, lawmakers issued a "law update" on Ream and other protected areas, stating: "The land area of 84.5 ha (209 acres) of the Ream National Park Zone shall be determined as a community area located in Ream commune, Prey Nub district of Preah Sihanouk province. Any issuance of land title certificate in this community area shall be required to obtain a prior approval from the Ministry of Environment in compliance with the Land Law."

== See also ==
- Ream Naval Base
- Koh Thmei
- Koh Seh
- Sihanoukville
