= Korea Engineering Plastics =

KOREA ENGINEERING PLASTIC CORPORATION
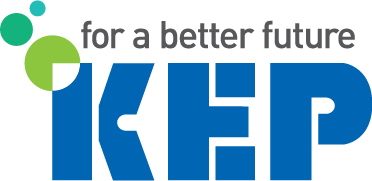
- Type: Ltd.
- Industry: Engineering Plastics
- Founded: 1987; 39 years ago
- Headquarters: 94, Sogong-ro, Jung-gu, Seoul, South Korea
- Key people: Caamano. John(CEO)
- Website: www.kepital.com

Korea Engineering Plastics (KEP) is a South Korean manufacturer of polyoxymethylene (POM). It is the fourth largest polyoxymethylene manufacturer in the world.

== General information ==
The company was founded in March 1987 as a joint venture from Tongyang Nylon Co., Ltd. in Korea, Mitsubishi Gas Chemical Company Inc. and Mitsubishi Corporation. It was the first producer of POM in Korea. In 1998, the Hyosung Corp. In the short term, 50 percent of the shares of the Tongyang Nylon Co. bought back in December 1999 by the Celanese AG.

The company has been headquartered in Seoul since 1987. Production facilities are located in Ulsan, Pyeongtaek (Korea) and Nantong (China). The company has locations in Europe, USA and China.

== Position in the polyoxymethylene market ==
Market leaders at the approx. 800 kt POM market are currently:

- Ticona (about 25%)
- DuPont (about 20%)
- Polyplastics (about 15%)
- KEP (about 12%)
- Mitsubishi (about 7%)
- BASF (about 5%)

The shareholders of KEP are active in this market with several subsidiaries: Mitsubishi Corporation with its subsidiary Mitsubishi Gas Chemical Company Inc (Japan / Thailand) and its stake in KEP (South Korea), Celanese with its subsidiary Celanese Engineered Materials Ticona) and the Asian holdings in Polyplastics (Japan) and KEP (South Korea).

== Products ==
KEP sells polyoxymethylene (POM) under the brand name Kepital, Polyamide (PA) as kepamide and polybutylene terephthalate (PBT) as Kepex.
