= Kep province =

Province of Cambodia

Kep Province ខេត្តកែប
- Province

Khmer transcription(s)
  - Khmer: ខេត្តកែប
  - UNGEGN: Khaet Kaep
  - ALA-LC: Khett Kaep
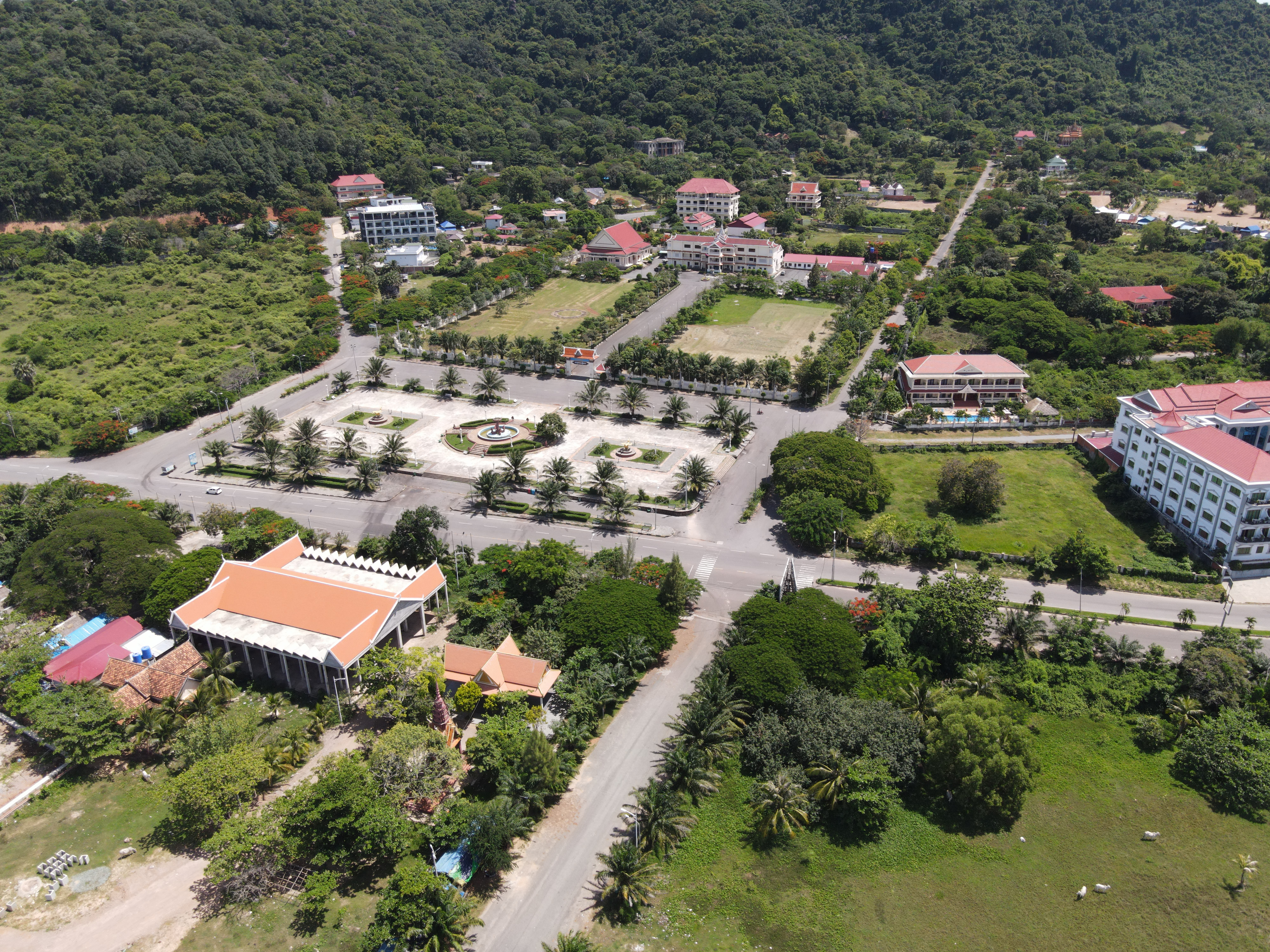
- Kep Province Hall

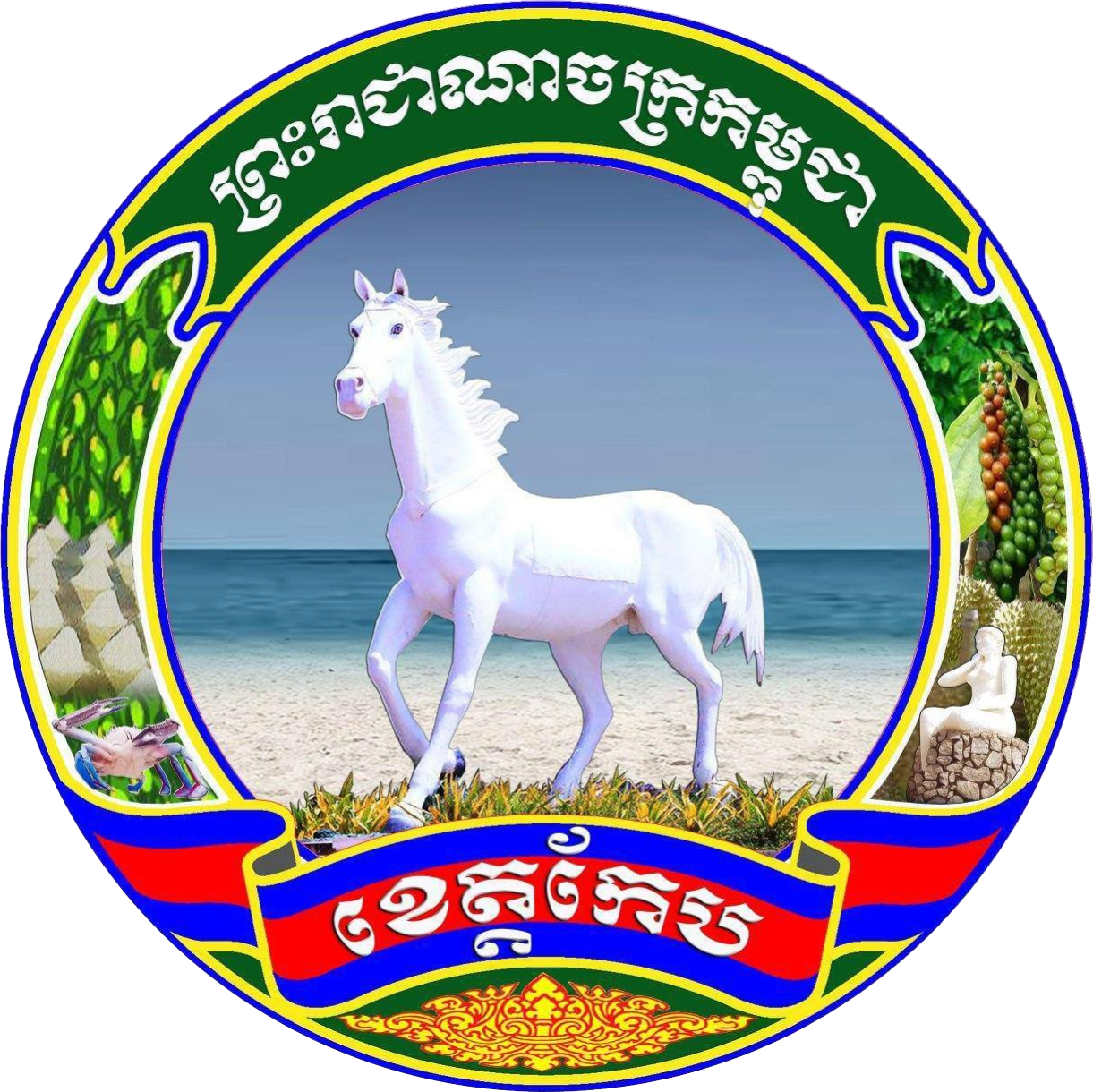
- Seal
- Nickname: Côte de la perle d'Agathe (before khmer rouge)
- Map of Cambodia highlighting Kep
- Coordinates: 10°29′N 104°18′E
- Country: Cambodia
- Provincial status: 22 December 2008
- Capital: Kep

Government
  - Governor: Ken Satha (CPP)
  - Deputy Governor: Phou Lik
  - National Assembly: 1 / 125

Area
  - Total: 336 km^{2} (130 sq mi)
  - Rank: 25th

Population (2024)
  - Total: ▲48,772
  - Rank: 25th
  - Density: 127/km^{2} (330/sq mi)
  - Rank: 10th
- Time zone: UTC+7 (ICT)
- Postal code: 22101
- Dialing code: +855
- ISO 3166 code: KH-23
- Districts: 2
- Website: www.kep.gov.kh

Kep Province (Khmer: ខេត្តកែប, Khaet Kaep, [kaep]) is the smallest province of Cambodia covering 336 km^{2} (130 sq mi), with a population of 41,798. It is one of the newest Cambodian provinces, together with Pailin, Sihanoukville and Tboung Khmum, created by Royal Decree on 22 December 2008, which separated Kep Municipality & Damnak Chang'aeur District from the Kampot province, as well as adjusting several provincial borders. It is both the smallest and least populous province of Cambodia. The provincial capital is Kep and the province contains the Kep National Park.

== Geography ==
=== Location ===
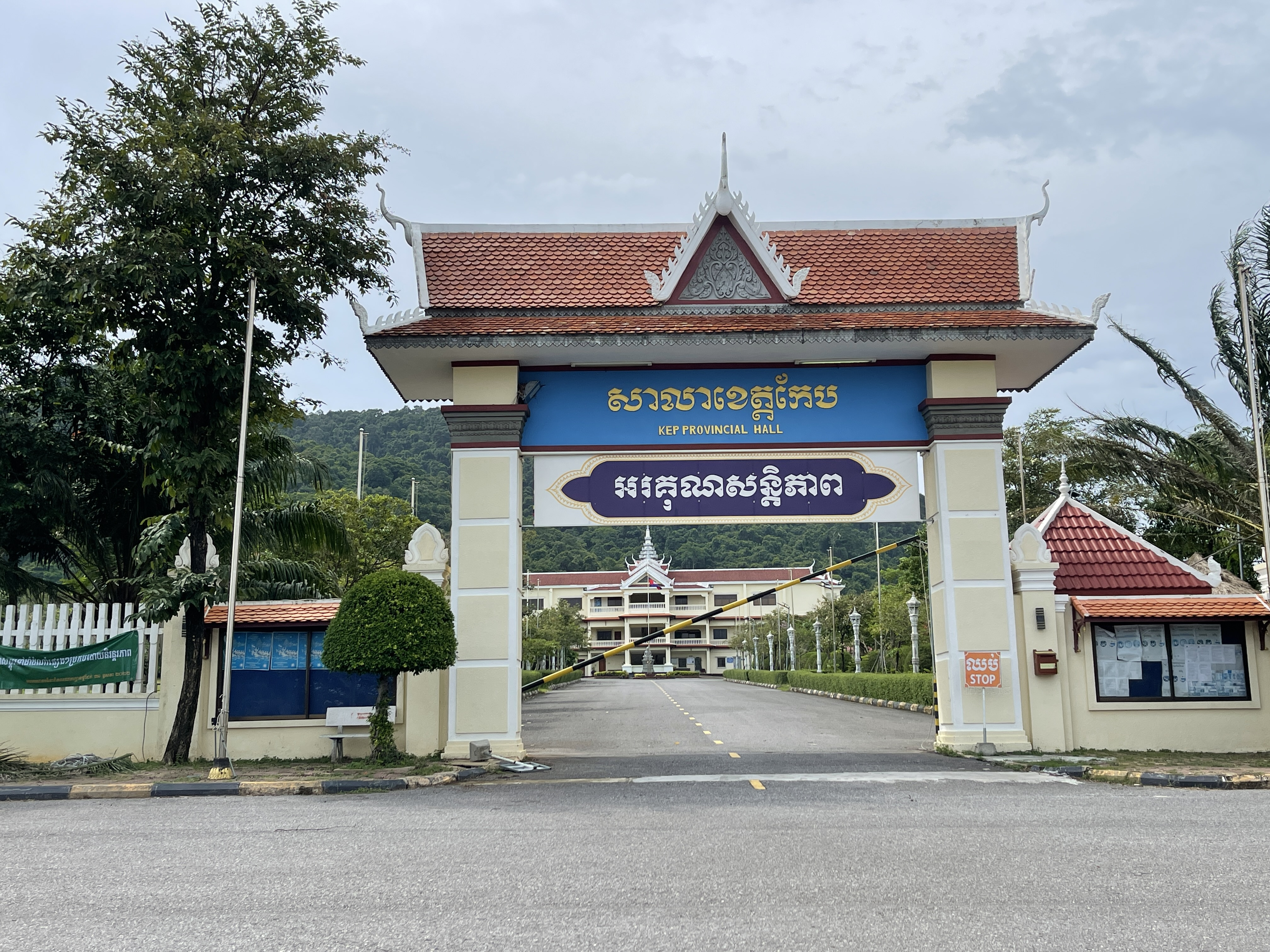
Kep Province Hall

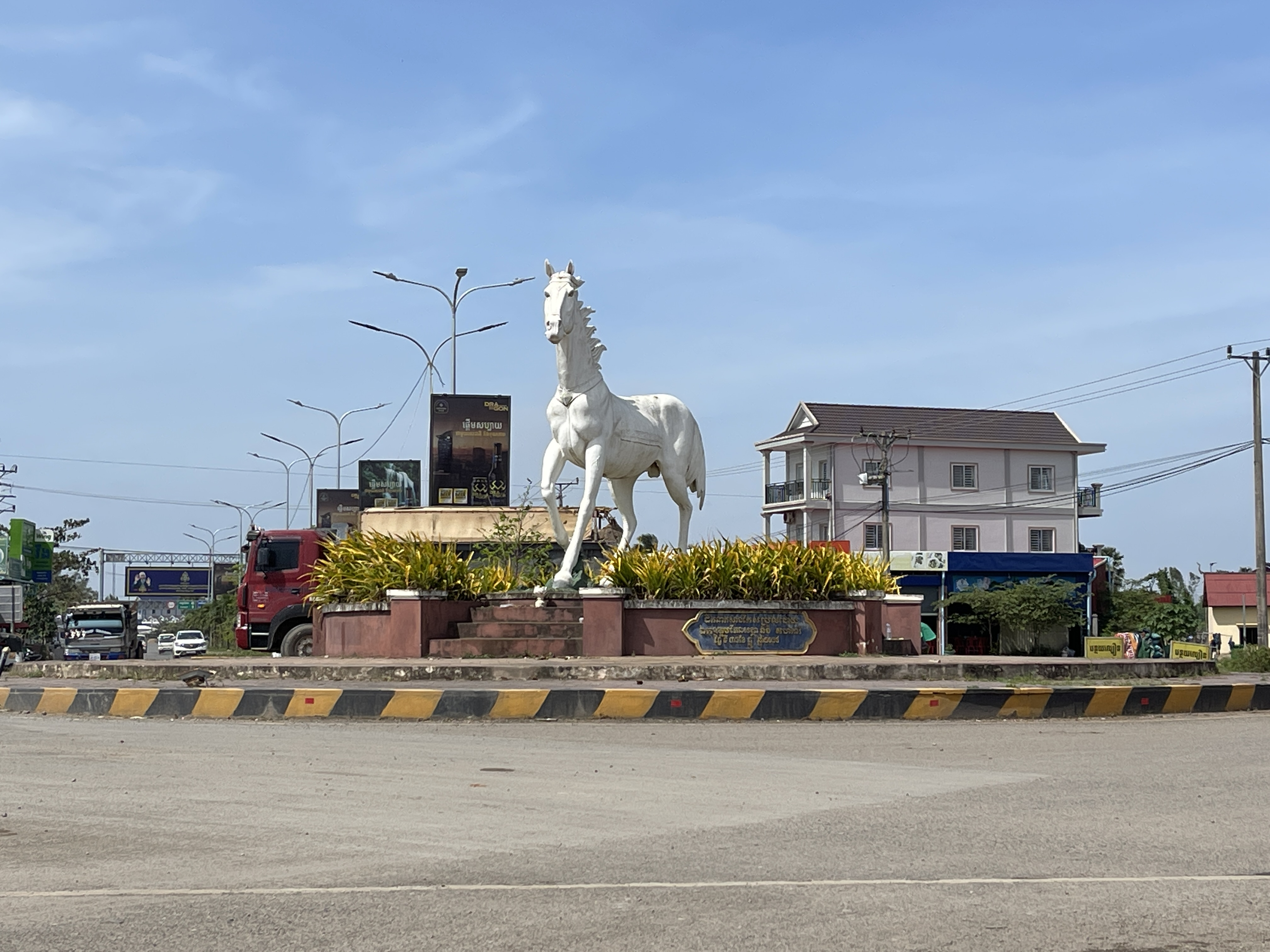
White Horse Roundabout (Kep)

The territory of Kep is entirely surrounded by Kampot province except for the 16 km of sea coast on the southern side fronting the Gulf of Thailand and the Vietnamese island of Phú Quốc. The western limit is 20 km from the town of Kampot. The eastern limit is some 20 km from the Vietnamese border.

=== Administrative division ===
It is subdivided into one district and one municipality, further divided into five communes.

ISO code	District	Khmer
23-01	Damnak Chang'aeur	ស្រុកដំណាក់ចង្អើរ
23-02	Kep Municipality	ក្រុងកែប

- Damnak Chang'aeur: It is the largest of the province and divided in three quarters – Angkaol to the west, Ou Krasar at the center and Pong Tuek at the east – and 11 groups (krom). It was the place where Australian David Wilson, 29, Briton Mark Slater, 28, and Frenchman Jean-Michel Braquet, 27, were kidnapped by a Khmer Rouge guerrilla unit led by Commander Chouk Rin in June 1994.
- Kep Municipality: The municipality, located at the center of the province, is subdivided into two quarters Sangkat Kep at the east of the Kep Peninsula and Sangkat Prey Thum at the west, and five groups.

=== Kep Archipelago ===
The Kep Peninsula enters southwest to the Kep Bay in a triangle. A tiny archipelago of 13 islands (Koh) and islets are located at the east side of the peninsula:

1. Koh Tonsay (កោះទន្សាយ, 'Rabbit Island')
2. Koh Kok (កោះកុក, Egret Island)
3. Koh Mtes (កោះម្ទេស, Chili Island)
4. Koh Svay (កោះស្វាយ, 'Mango Island')
5. Koh Tbal (កោះត្បាល់, 'Millstone Island')
6. Koh Hal Trei.(កោះហាលត្រី, 'Dry Fish Island')
7. Koh Svay Prey (កោះស្វាយព្រៃ), 'Wild Mango Island')
8. Koh Sarang (កោះសារ៉ាង 'Sarang Island')
9. Koh Pou (កោះពោធិ or Pura Island, 'Enlightening Island')
10. Koh Makprang. (កោះម៉ាកប្រាង, 'Makprang Island' – A Cambodian wild small fruit like a mango.)
11. Koh Angkrong (កោះអង្គ្រង, 'Angkrong Island' – Angkrong is the Ziziphus cambodiana tree species.)
12. Koh Ach Seh (កោះអាចម៍សេះ, 'Horse Dung Island', however the name is popular evolving to just Kos Seh – Horse Island.)
13. Koh Snguot. (កោះស្ងួត, 'Dry Island')

==== Koh Tonsay ====
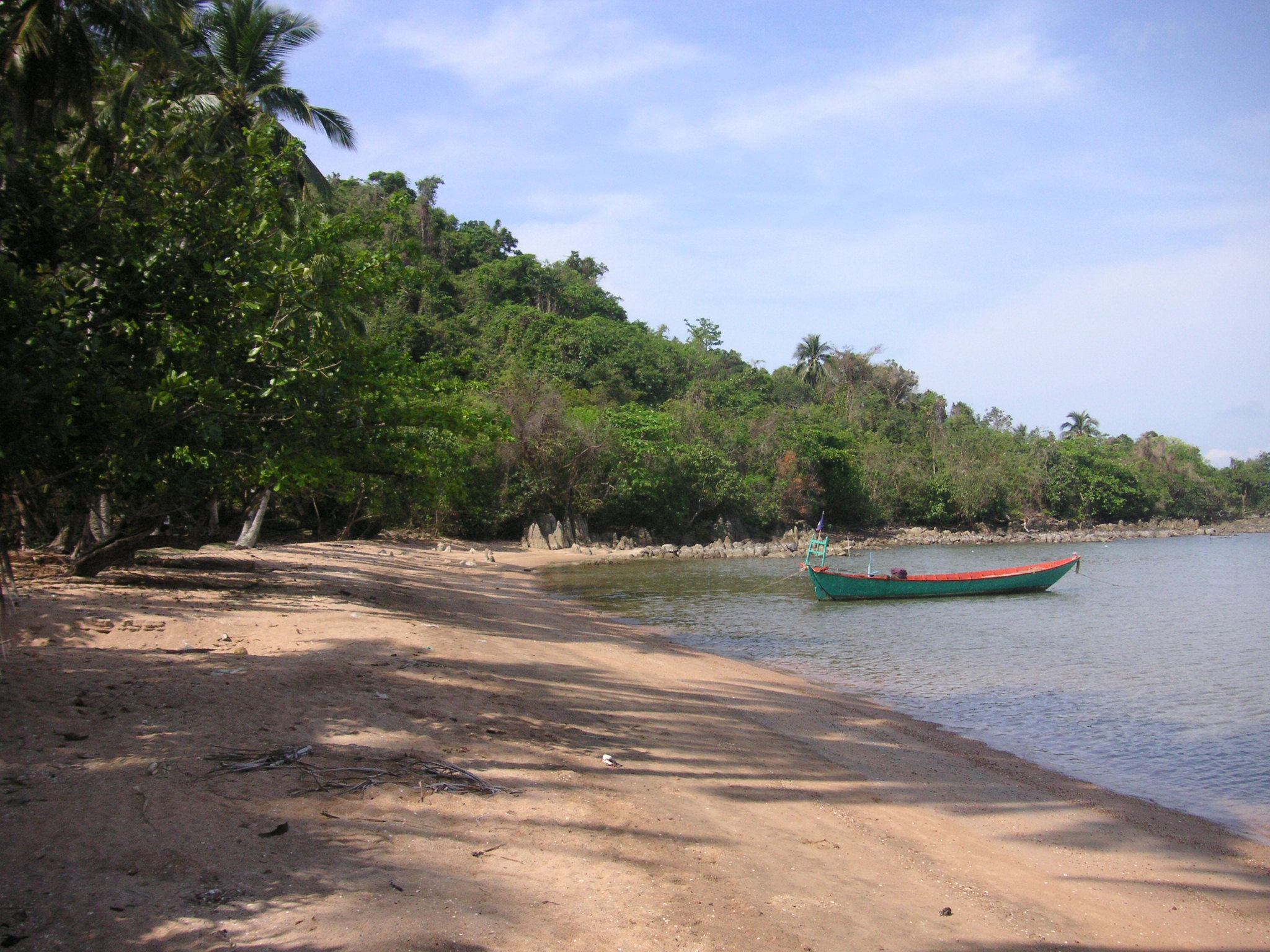
Koh Thonsay's beach

Koh Tonsay (Khmer: កោះទន្សាយ meaning 'Rabbit Island') is located about 4.5 Kilometers southwest of Kep. Tourists are drawn to the two white sand beaches, and the sea is shallow and proper for swimming. At the sea bottom are a variety of corals, sea animals and plants which attract researchers and ecologists.

The name Koh Tonsay is derived from the word Rumsay. While trying to avoid the commander's troops, Prince Sakor Reach grew hopeless because his own troops began to tire. He led his remaining troops across the sea to an island in front of Kep city, where the troops spread out. Accordingly, the island was called Koh Rumsay, Koh Ormsay, Koh Ornsay, and Koh Tonsay, as it is known today. Another version is that, according to many locals who spent there youth in Kep before 1975, the island was previously called Koh Antai. There is no apparent meaning for this word.

Koh Tonsay is 2 square kilometers in area. During then-Prince Norodom Sihanouk's Sangku Reastr Niyum regime, it was used as a place to rehabilitate criminals, who were also used to defend the island. Horse cart paths and wooden, thatch roofed motels were also constructed during this time. Most of this infrastructure has been destroyed by weather and decades of war. Today Koh Tonsay is a major tourist attraction for Kep. There are about 8 khmer run basic guest houses and about 5 restaurants, serving mainly fresh seafood like crabs, shrimps and fish. During the day it can get quite busy with day tourists, who leave around 4 pm, so for the sunset there are only a few overnight people there. Electricity runs only from 6-9 pm by generators. Water can run short during the dry months (Dec-Apr), Long-tail boats with big water tanks supply the island with water.

== History ==
Under French rule Kep belonged to the Circonscription Résidentielle de Kampot, developing into Cambodia's most prestigious beach town. Established as such in 1908 and named Kep-sur-Mer it was a thriving resort town for the French and Cambodian elite until the early 1970s.

Constructed between 1953 and 1970 – after French occupation, Kep's modernist villas are unique. Architects Vann Molyvann and Lu Ban Hap who embodied Cambodia's golden age of architectural modernism, blended elements of the modern movement (Bauhaus, Richard Neutra and Le Corbusier) with traditional Khmer architecture, promoted by King Sihanouk – known as New Khmer Architecture.

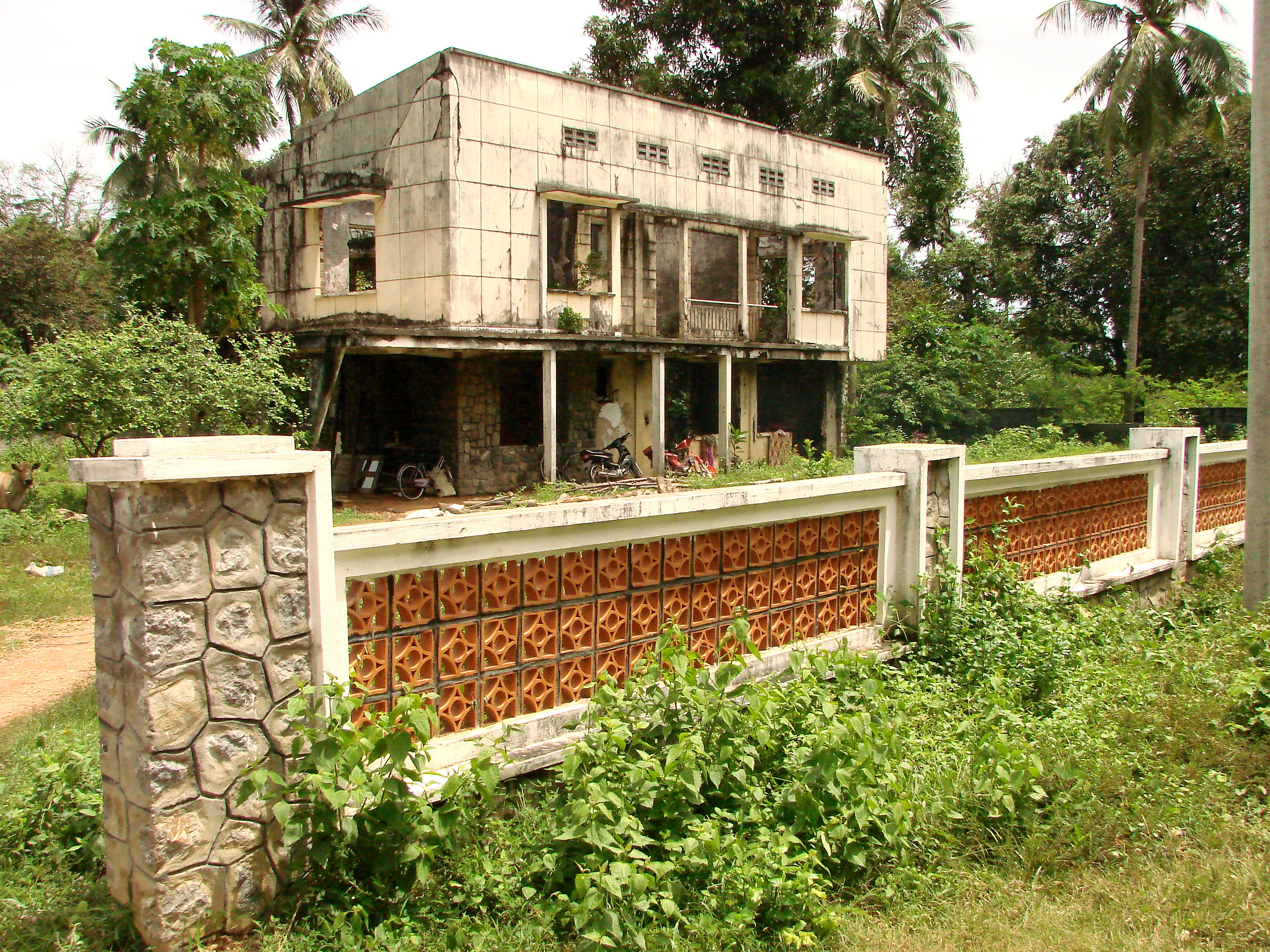
An old building in Kep

The ocean is lined with wide sidewalks and large statues. Prince Norodom Sihanouk not only kept his own villa, but his own island as well. Ile des Ambassadeurs was a favorite spot for Sihanouk to entertain a regular stream of guests.

A paved road connects the town with Kampot. Kep's coastline consists mostly of mangrove marshes and black rock rather than the white sands of Sihanoukville, although a beach nourishment with the white sand of Sihanoukville has made the beach wider and cleaner.

== Education ==
Five schools for secondary education are located in the province attended by 588 students, of which 246 were females in 2008. In the same year there were 9 kindergartens and 21 primary schools with a total population of 9,644 students.

As a former French settlement, Kep was the seat of French schools like the Sisters of the Providence's School that was closed in 1975 when the Khmer Rouge took power. The building was demolished in early 2012 and the land dedicated to official offices.

The French legacy in education is represented today by the Ecole pour Tous dedicated mainly to children in the area. The province has no university, depending on that in nearby Kampot province.

The Don Bosco Technical School Kep offers technical training to local young people, and the Kep Gardens Association both institutes for underprivileged children and teenagers.

The Kep International School (KIS) is the first English language school in Kep following a Cambridge curriculum in the mornings and in the afternoons dedicated to Khmer classes such as reading, writing and history, among other topics.

== Places of interest ==
The Rabbit Island (Koh Tunsay) is probably the main tourist attraction in Kep, however the tiniest Cambodian province has many other places of interest promoted from an environment perspective as ecotourism not only by the local government, but also by private initiatives like the Kep Tourist Association that gathers local hotels and restaurants of the province.

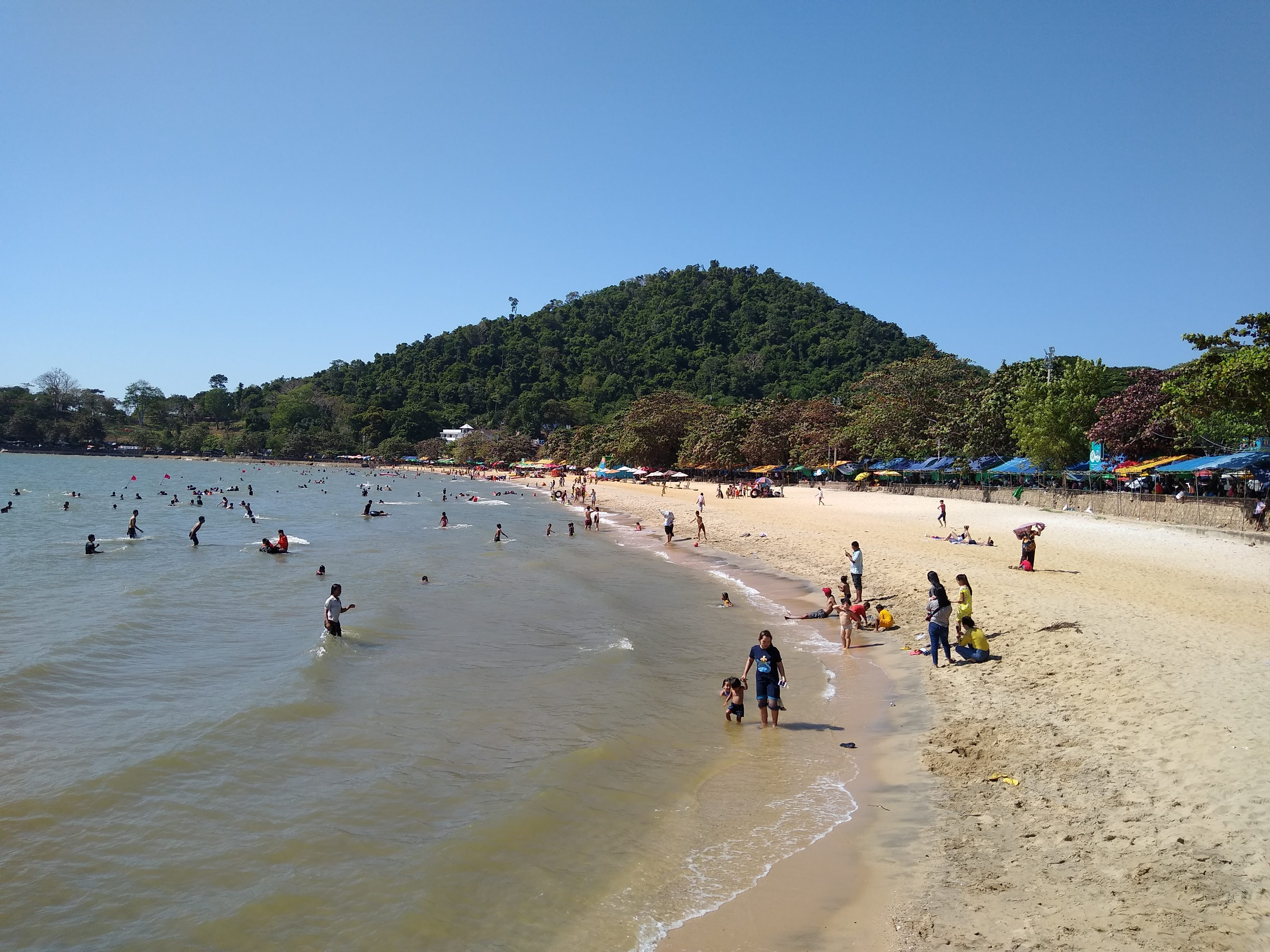
Kep Beach

Kep Beach is located at Kep District, in the tip of the peninsula. The area is the site of several ruined French mansions. Mostly black sand now recovered with the white sand of Sihanoukville.

Jungle Trek is located inside the Kep National Park with an 8 kilometer trek around the Kep hills.

The Butterfly Farm is a private ecological garden in the Jasmine Valley Trail dedicated to preserve the local environment led by expatriate philanthropic persons.

The Don Bosco Birth House Monument was inaugurated in May 2012 as a homage to Don Bosco and it is a reproduction of the house where John Bosco was born in 1816 in Castelnuovo Don Bosco, Italy. It is inside the Don Bosco Vocational Center campus.

Phnom Sar Sear consists of three small mountains spread across a total land area of approximately 1.5 square kilometers. The mountain rises to a height of around 40 meters holding a number of caves. The cave of Phnom Ach Pro Chiev and particularly the cave of Phnom Dam Rey Sar are the best known.

== Economy ==
The economy of Kep province is rather confined to agriculture, fishery, tourism and salt production. 92% of the province's population was dedicated to agriculture in 2008 (75% rice farming). In that same year there were 10 registered guest houses. In 2013 there were 16 main hotels enlisted by the Department of Tourism and 65 by the local Tourist Association according to www.visitkep.com. Kep Expo is an official initiative to promote Kep province as a tourist and development spot, its artists, production and environment protection.

== Health ==
In 2008 there were 452 families with a birth during that year. 150 women delivered by a traditional birth attendant and 2 babies died one month after their birth. 6 children under 5 years old died in 2008 and 7 children 9–12 months old did not receive full immunization.

Families depend their water mainly from raining and well sources: in 2008 the 38% of families were using water from ring wells and open dug wells and 33% from pump mixed wells. During the dry season of that year, 78% of families were drinking water from unsafe sources.

According to NCDD 2009 study, 42 families were living with a member contaminated with HIV AIDS, there were 105 registered orphans, 104 families victims of a natural disaster and 11 persons who were victims of land mines and unexploded weapons.

There were 5 clinics registered in Kep province by 2008 and none hospitals.

Malaria, Dengue and others are current tropical diseases in Cambodia. South coastal provinces are considered of high risk malaria areas, especially islands and jungle territories, where it is advisable to keep precautionary measures against mosquito bites, especially during the raining season.

== Transport ==
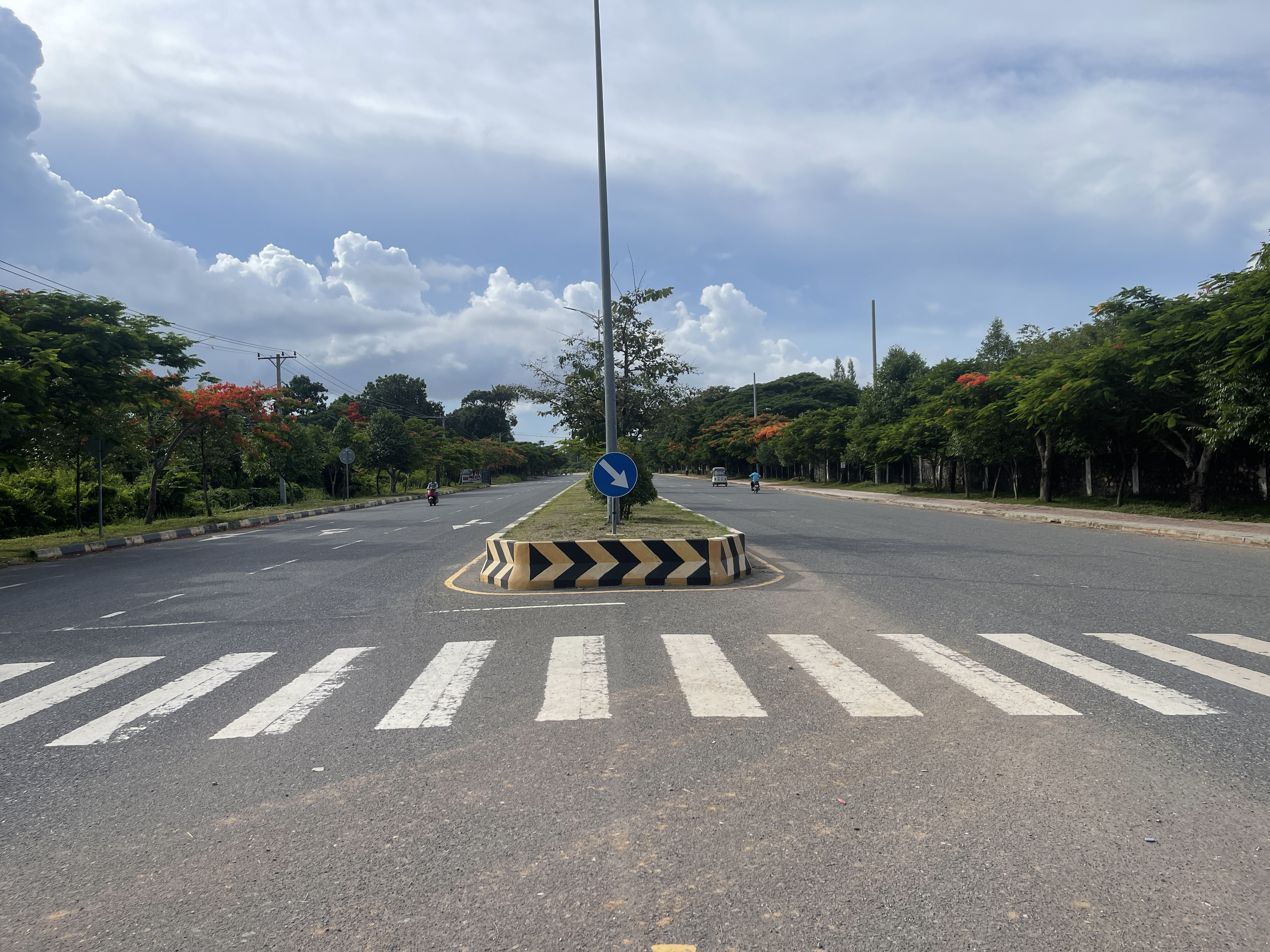
National Road 33A (Kep City)

Highway No 33 traverses the province from west to east, running from Kampot town to Kampong Trach District then onward to the Vietnamese border. A lane of the No 33 named No 33A detours at the Kep White Horse Monument in Damnak Chang'aeur District, running along the coast before rejoining No 33, some 3 km (2 mi) to the east.

Kep has no administered public bus or taxi transport. The gap is filled by motorcycle taxis (known locally as moto-dop) and tuk-tuks. Commercial bus companies such as Phnom Penh Sorya Transport serve the route between Phnom Penh – Kep and Kampot via National Highway No 3 and No 33. Public transport from Kep to Sihanoukville is served by shuttle bus service.

The province is crossed by the southern Cambodian Rail line linking Phnom Penh and the Port of Sihanoukville with a station in Kep. However, as of 2013 the line is not in operation.

The small port of Kep is served only by small tourist boats sailing for the Kep Archipelago, especially Rabbit Island. There is no scheduled sea link to other domestic coastal ports or neighboring Vietnam and Thailand.
