= Kep Municipality =

Kep municipality ក្រុងកែប Krong Kep
- Municipality
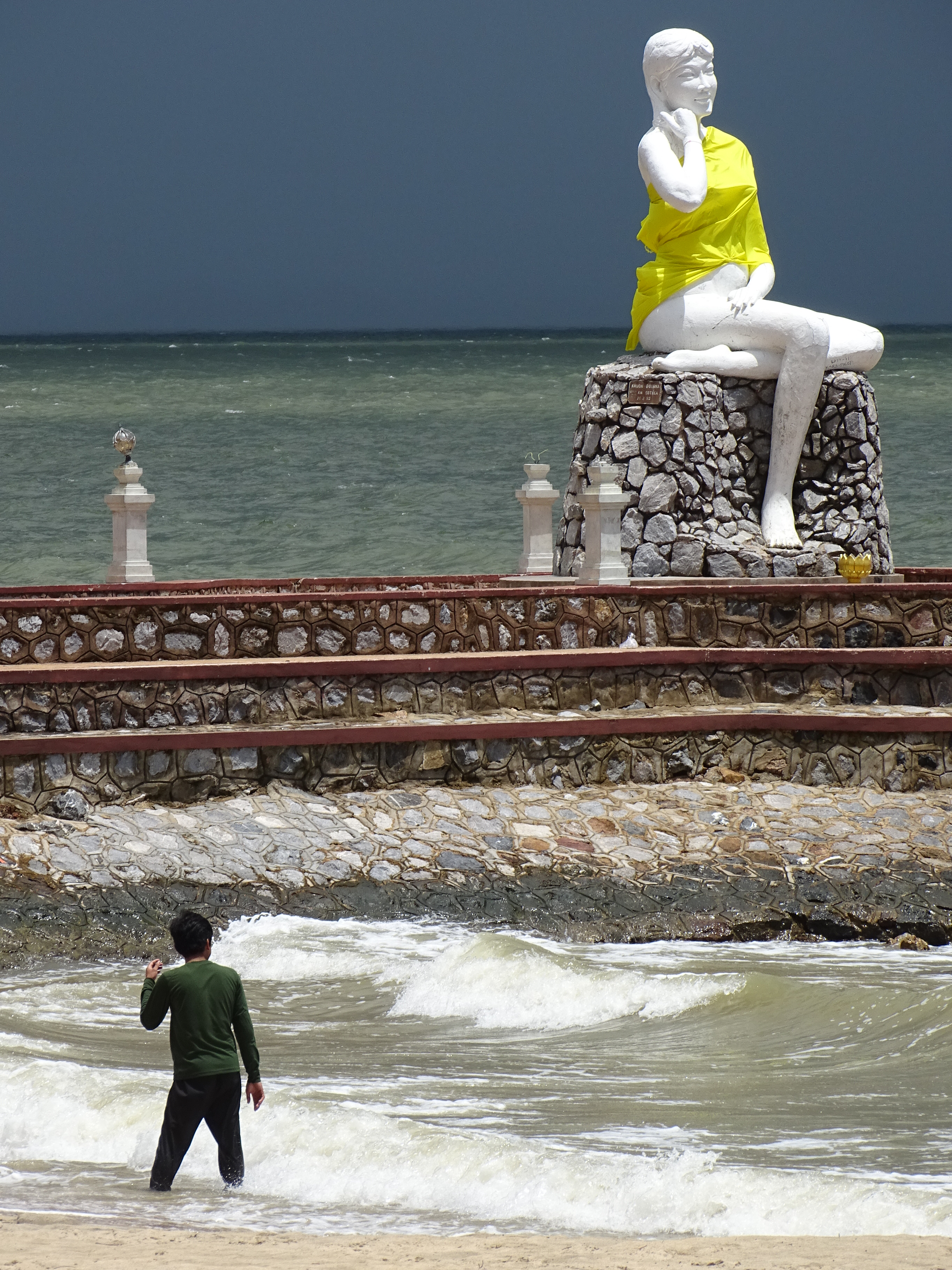
- Interactive map of Kep municipality
- Coordinates: 10.5306°N 104.3112°E
- Country: Cambodia
- Province: Kep

Government
  - Governor: Dr. Som Piseth

Area
  - Total: 80.5 km^{2} (31.1 sq mi)

Population (1998)
  - Total: 10,319
  - Density: 128.19/km^{2} (332.0/sq mi)
- Time zone: UTC+7 (ICT)
- Postal code: 220201
- Website: https://www.kep.gov.kh

Kep municipality (Khmer: ក្រុងកែប) is a municipality in Kep province, in southern Cambodia. The municipality is subdivided into 2 sangkats and 5 kroms. In the 1998 census, the population of the district was 10,319 people in 2,000 households.

== Subdivisions ==
Kep district has three sangkats and seven khum:

Sangkat (quarter)	Phum (villages)
Kep	Kep, Kaev Krasang
Prey Thum	Damnak Chang'aeur, Kampong Tralach, Thmei
Ou Krasar	Ou Krasar, Damnak Chambak
