= Prey Sar prison =

Jail in Phnom Penh

Prey Sar Prison
- Location: Phnom Penh, Cambodia
- Status: Operational
- Security class: Minimum-Maximum
- Capacity: 500
- Population: 10,000 (January 2020)
- Managed by: Ministry of Interior

The Prey Sar Prison, previously known as S24, is the largest of 24 Cambodian prisons. It is administrated by the Cambodian Ministry of Interior with liaisons from the Ministry of Health.

Kang Kek Iew was held at Prey Sar for two years.
