= Sompov Poun =

Sompov Poun ក្រុងសំពៅពូន
- City
- Interactive map of Sompov Poun
- Coordinates: 10.962943°N 105.066688°E
- Country: Cambodia
- Province: Kandal
- Municipality: Sompov Poun
- Established: 22 December 2022

Government
  - Type: City municipality
  - Mayor: Eng Sovichet (CPP)
- Elevation: 4–7 m (13–23 ft)

Population (2019)
  - Total: 48,151
  - Rank: Unknown
- Time zone: UTC+7 (ICT)
- Geocode: 000812

Sompov Poun (Khmer: ក្រុងសំពៅពូន, Krông Sâmpouv Pûn, Khmer pronunciation: [kroːŋ sɑm.pʊəw puːn]) is one of the newest cities in Kandal including Arey Ksat. It was officially established as a city on 22 December 2022 by sub‑decree, formed from several communes previously part of Kaoh Thum District. The city serves as a local administrative and economic center in the province, located in the Phnom Penh metropolitan region.

== History ==
Sompov Puon was created as a municipality (city) by the Government of Cambodia on 22 December 2022. The establishment was part of a broader administrative reorganization that created new cities in Kandal province, transforming five communes from Kaoh Thum District into the new city of Sompov Puon. The city administration office is located in Sampov Poun Commune.

== Geography ==
The city lies near the Mekong River, featuring flat and fertile land suitable for agriculture. The climate is tropical, with a distinct wet and dry season typical of southern Cambodia.

== Demographic ==
As of the 2019 Cambodian general population census, the total population of the five communes that now make up Krong Sampov Poun was approximately 48,151.

The population is predominantly ethnic Khmer, and Buddhism is the main religion, reflected in the presence of local pagodas and community religious activities.

Most residents live in rural or semi-urban villages, with livelihoods centered around agriculture, local trade, and small businesses. Population growth and urbanization are expected to increase as the municipality develops further, particularly due to its proximity to Phnom Penh and the Cambodia–Vietnam border.

The population of each commune is as follows:

Population of each division in Sompov Poun
Commune	Romanization	Population
សង្កាត់ឈើខ្មៅ	Sangkat Chhoeu Khmao	10,832 (2019)
សង្កាត់ព្រែកជ្រៃ	Sangkat Prek Chrey	9,367 (2019)
សង្កាត់ព្រែកស្ពឺ	Sangkat Prek Speu	20,744 (2019)
សង្កាត់ជ្រោយតាកែវ	Sangkat Chroy Takeo	9,318 (2019)
សង្កាត់សំពៅពូន	Sangkat Sompov Puon	20,424 (2019)

== Administration ==
Sompov Puon city comprises the following former communes from Kaoh Thum District:

- សង្កាត់ឈើខ្មៅ (Sangkat Chheu Khmau)
- សង្កាត់ព្រែកជ្រៅ (Sangkat Prek Chrov)
- សង្កាត់ព្រែកស្ពឺ (Sangkat Prek Speu)
- សង្កាត់ជ្រោយតាកែវ (Sangkat Chroy Takeo)
- សង្កាត់សំពៅពូន (Sangkat Sampov Pun)

== Transportation ==
Krong Sampov Poun is primarily served by National Road 21 (NR21), which connects the municipality to Ta Khmau and other parts of Kandal province. The road also provides access toward the Cambodia–Vietnam border, facilitating regional travel and trade.

The city is further served by local roads linking residential areas, markets, and administrative centers.

== Economy ==
Krong Sampov Poun’s location near the Cambodia-Vietnam border gives it strategic importance for local trade. The municipality’s economy includes:

- Cross-border trade: Small-scale goods and agricultural products are often transported to and from Vietnam.
- Transport corridors: National Road 21 and connecting provincial roads facilitate the movement of goods and support commerce.
