= Oudong Me Chey =

Oudong Me Chey ឧដុង្គម៉ែជ័យ
- City
- Krong Oudong Me Chey; ក្រុងឧដុង្គម៉ែជ័យ
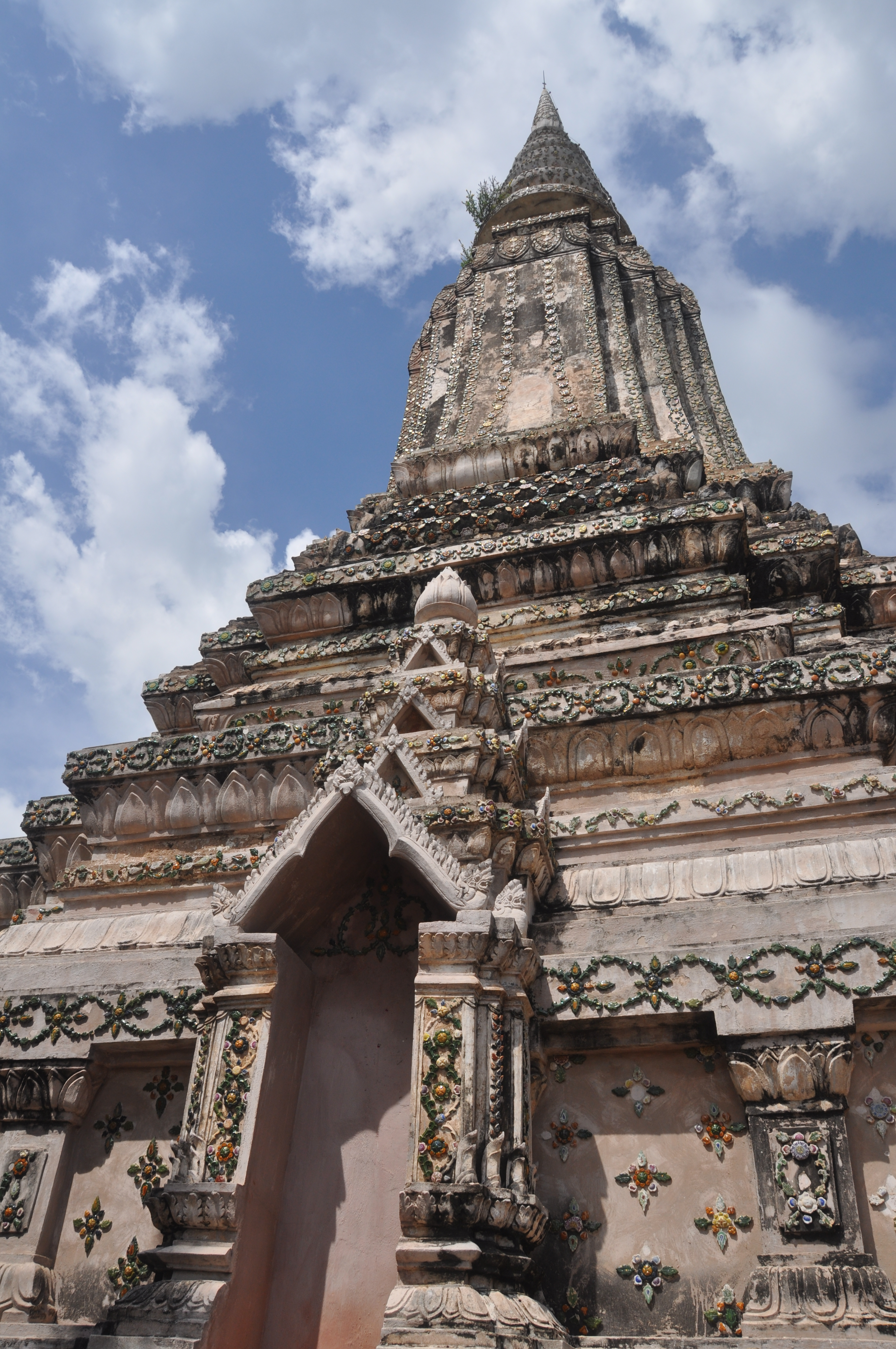
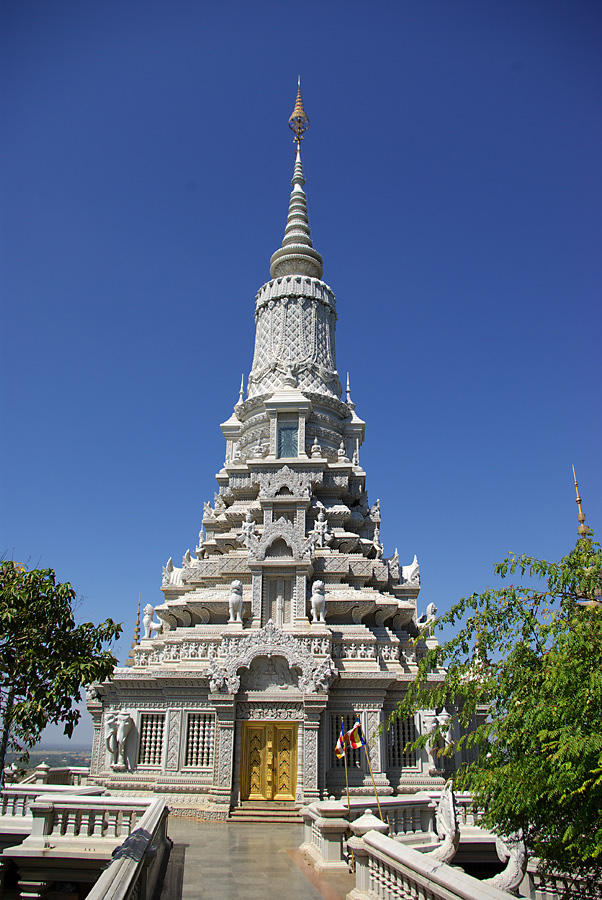
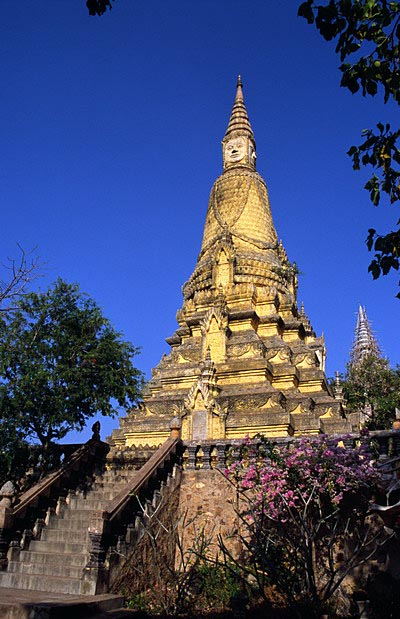
- Top right: Ang Doung Stupa, Top left: Preah Sakyamoni Chedi, Bottom: Damrei Sam Poan Stupa
- Interactive map of Oudong Me Chey
- Country: Cambodia
- Province: Kampong Speu
- Municipality: Oudong Me Chey
- Capital of the Kingdom of Cambodia: 1618–1863
- Administrative Town: 23 December 2022

Government
  - Type: City municipality
  - Mayor: Preap Koy Vattanak (CPP)

Population (2019)
  - Total: 53,586
  - Rank: Unknown
- Time zone: UTC+7 (ICT)

Oudong Me Chey (sometimes Oudong Mae Chey) (Khmer: ឧដុង្គម៉ែជ័យ,Krŏng Oudong Me Chey,Khmer pronunciation: [ʔuː.doŋ maːe ceɪ]) a city located in Kampong Speu province, Cambodia. The city was officially established by sub‑decree on 22 December 2022 as part of a nationwide administrative reorganization that created three new municipalities, alongside Arey Ksat and Sompov Poun. Oudong Me Chey was formed by reorganizing part of the former Oudong District into a municipal administration, comprising five communes with its administrative center in Veal Pong.

== History ==
=== Oudong in the Post-Angkorian Period ===
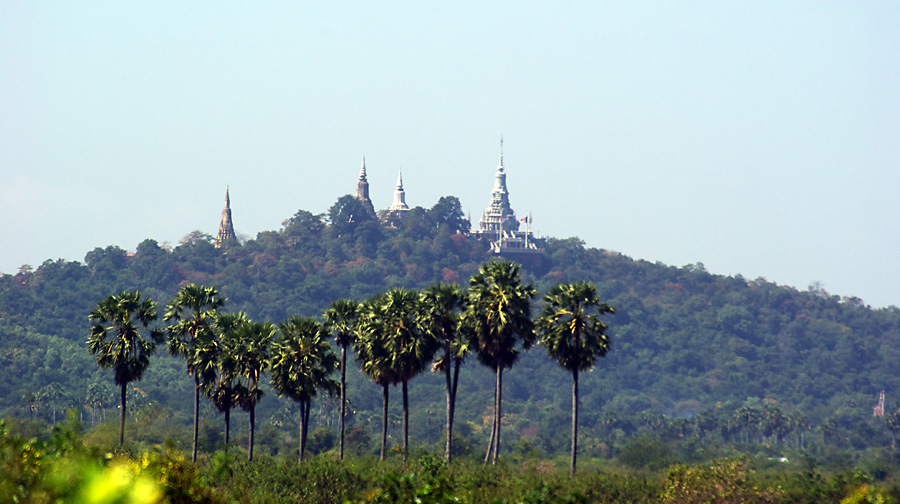
Stupas on the summit of Oudong Hill

Oudong (sometimes Romanized as Udong) served as the royal capital of Cambodia for much of the 17th to 19th centuries, following the decline of Longvek and preceding the relocation of the capital to Phnom Penh. The site is historically significant for its royal stupas and monuments, including the Oudong Mountain stupas, which contain the remains of several Cambodian kings and are a major cultural and religious landmark.

=== During the Khmer Rouge Regime ===
Between 1975 and 1979, the Khmer Rouge regime caused significant disruption in the area that now forms Oudong Me Chey. Many of the royal stupas and monuments in Oudong were damaged or neglected, and the local population was forcibly relocated as part of nationwide collectivization policies.

=== Modern Administration ===
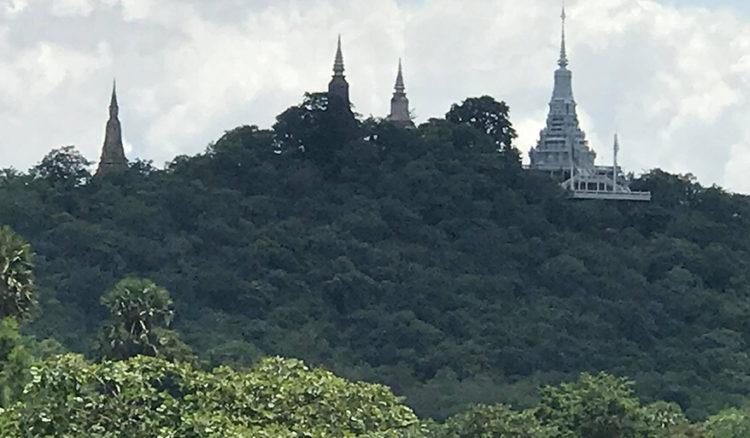
Distant view of Phnom Udong with local flora.

In the late 20th century, the area around Oudong (Odongk) remained a largely rural district within Kampong Speu province. On 23 December 2022, the Royal Government of Cambodia issued a sub‑decree establishing Oudong Me Chey City as part of a nationwide administrative reorganization that created three new municipalities, alongside Sompov Poun and Arey Ksat. Oudong Me Chey was formed by reorganizing part of the former Oudong District into a municipal administration to enhance local governance and support urban and administrative development in the region.

== Geography ==
Oudong Me Chey City is located in the northern part of Kampong Speu Province, Cambodia, approximately 40 km northwest of Phnom Penh. The municipality is bordered by the remaining area of Oudong District to the south and east, Samaki Monichey District to the west, Kandal Province to the northeast, and Kampong Chhnang Province to the north. The terrain is generally flat to gently undulating, with some low hills in the northern part of the city.

The city lies within the Mekong River basin and features a tropical wet and dry climate. Waterways and small tributaries in the area support local agriculture and small-scale fishing activities. Vegetation is dominated by rice paddies, secondary forest patches, and plantation crops.

== Demographic ==
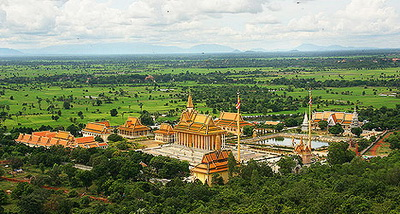
Aerial view of a Buddhist temple complex at the base of the hill, overlooking the vast agricultural plains of Kandal Province.

As of the 2019 Cambodian general population census, the total population of the communes that now form Oudong Me Chey City was approximately 53,586. (Note: Official figures for the city after its establishment in 2022 have not yet been published.)

The population of each commune is as follows:

Population of each division in Oudong Me Chey
Commune	Romanization	Population (2019)
សង្កាត់វាំងចាស់	Sangkat Vaing Chas	6,812
សង្កាត់ត្រាចទង់	Sangkat Trach Tong	9,149
សង្កាត់ព្រះស្រែ	Sangkat Preah Sre	10,998
សង្កាត់ក្សេមក្សាន្ត	Sangkat Ksem Ksan	11,413
សង្កាត់វាលពង់	Sangkat Veal Pong	15,214

== Administration ==
Oudong Me Chey City consists of five communes (sangkats):

- សង្កាត់វាំងចាស់ (Vaing Chas)
- សង្កាត់ត្រាចទង (Trach Tong)
- សង្កាត់ព្រះស្រែ (Preah Sre)
- សង្កាត់ក្សេមក្សាន (Ksem Ksan)
- សង្កាត់វាលពង់ (Veal Pong)

== Transportation ==
Oudong Me Chey City is served by major national highways that connect it to other parts of Cambodia. The municipality has access to National Road 5, which links Phnom Penh with Kampong Chhnang, Pursat and Battambang, forming part of the Asian Highway Network. National Road 51 also passes through the area, providing a direct connection between National Road 4 and National Road 5 and facilitating travel to Kandal and Kampong Speu provinces. South of its junction with National Road 4, the route continues as National Road 41, providing onward connections toward southern provinces.

== Tourism ==
Oudong Me Chey City is known for its historical and religious sites associated with the former royal capital of Oudong. The city contains several royal stupas and Buddhist monasteries, which are important centers of religious activity and cultural heritage.

Annual religious ceremonies are held at these sites, drawing both local pilgrims and domestic visitors. The hilltop complexes also offer panoramic views of the surrounding countryside, making them a significant attraction for those interested in Cambodia's history and religious traditions.

== Gallery ==
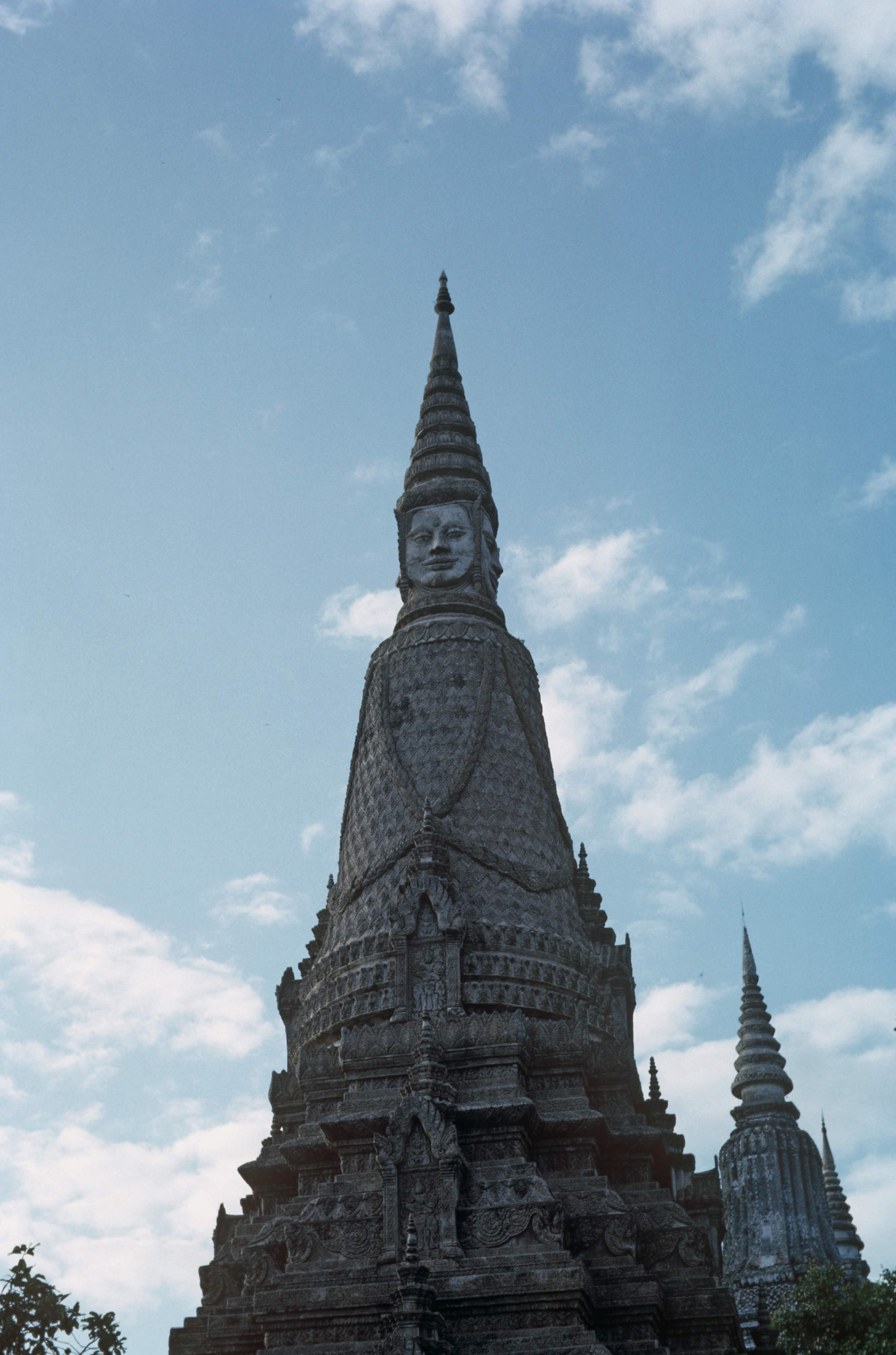
Chet Dey Mak Proum, the Stupa of King Sisowath Monivong.

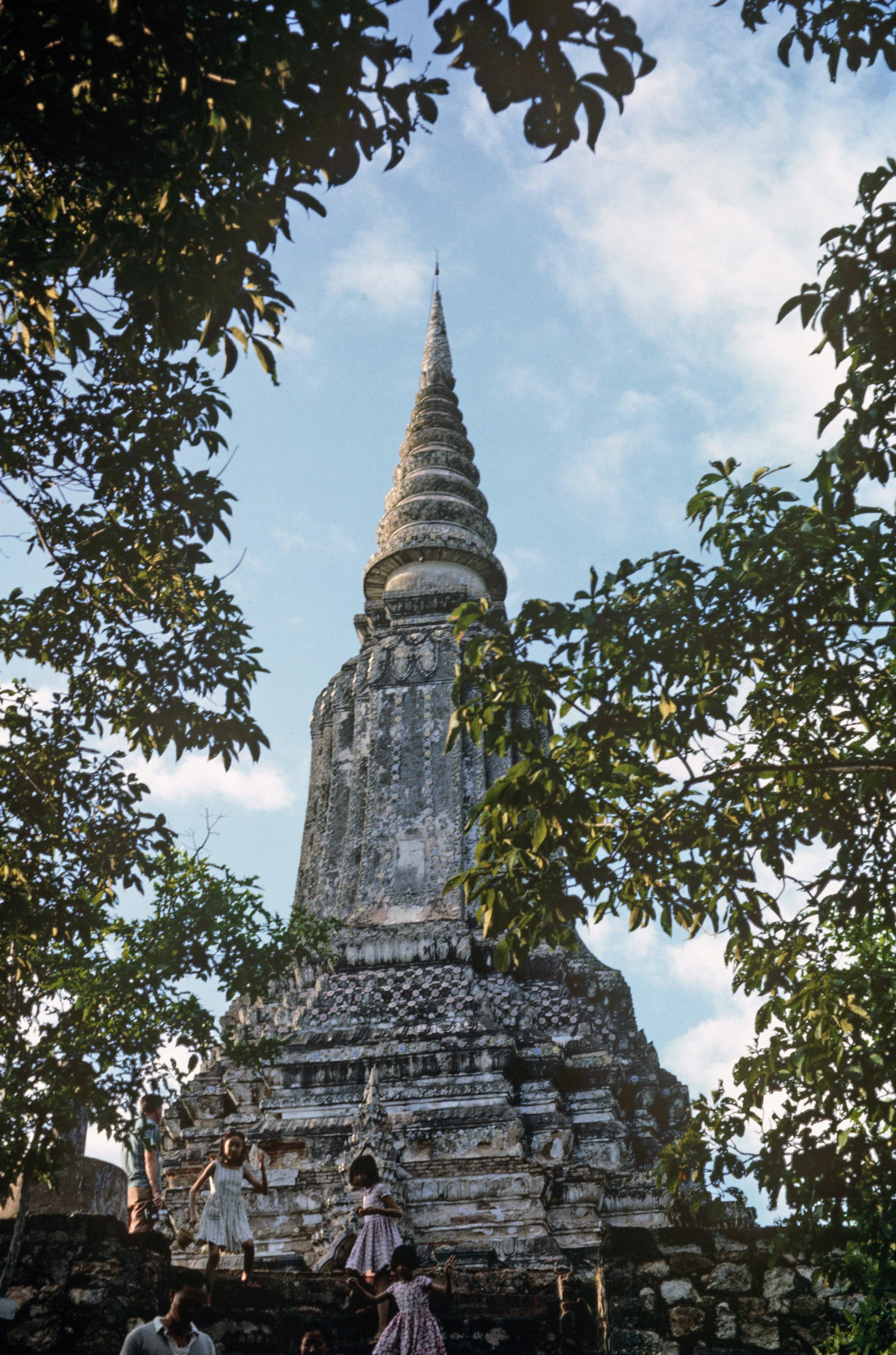
The Damrei Sam Poan Stupa, Built to honor Queen Ang Mey.

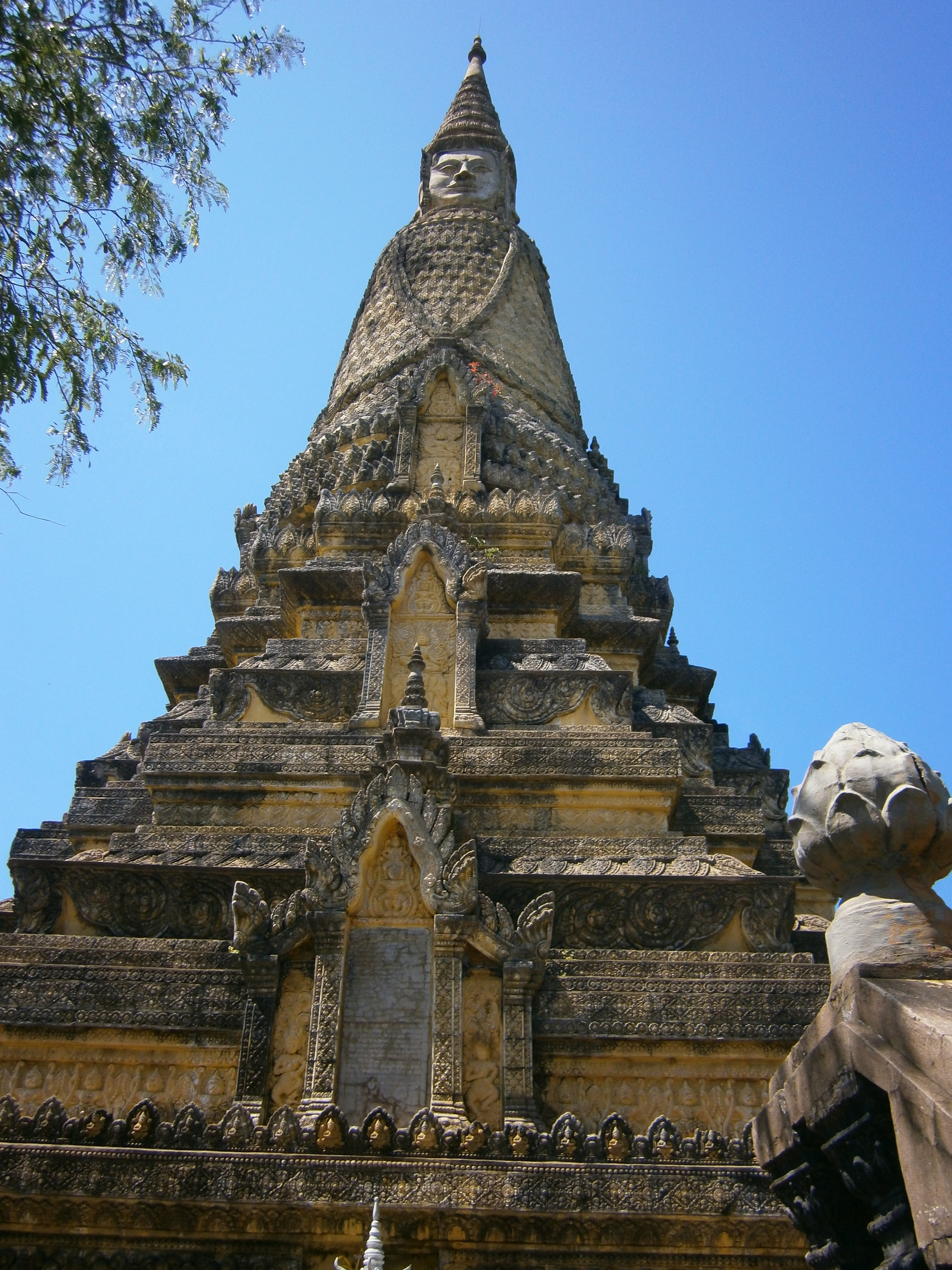
Lower-angle view of Chet Dey Mak Proum (King Sisowath Monivong's Stupa).

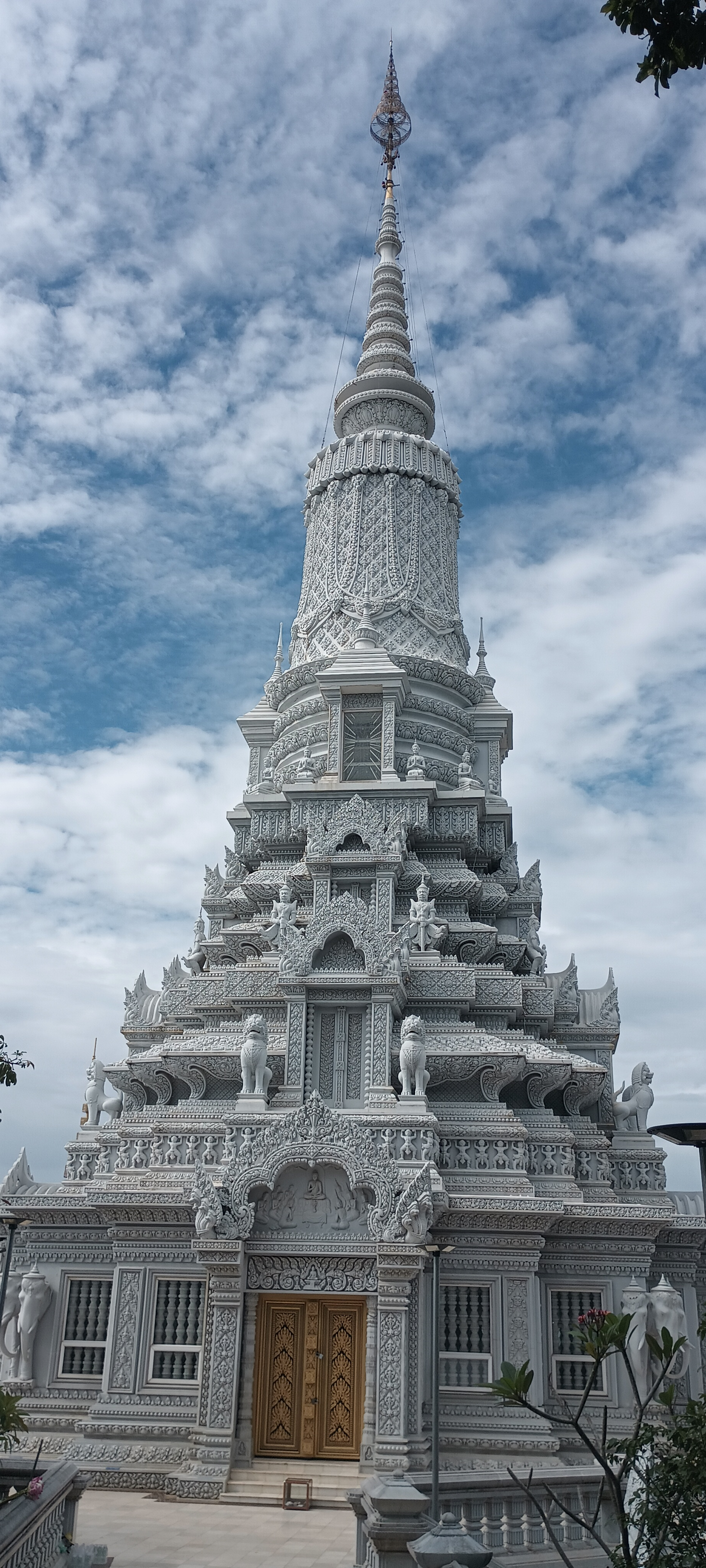
The iconic Preah Sakyamoni Chedi, built to house relics of the Buddha.

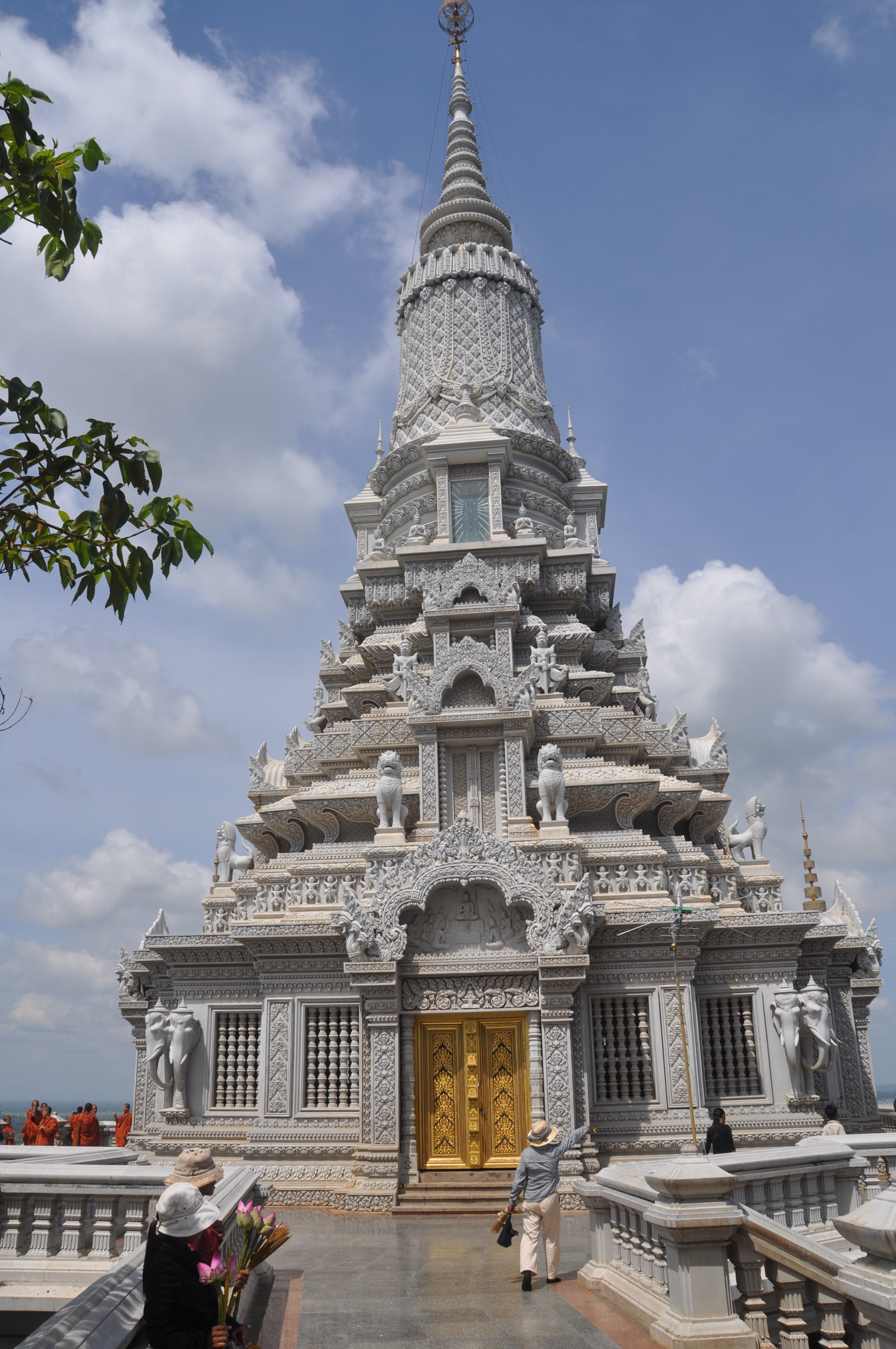
Visitors and worshippers at the golden entrance of the Preah Sakyamoni Chedi.

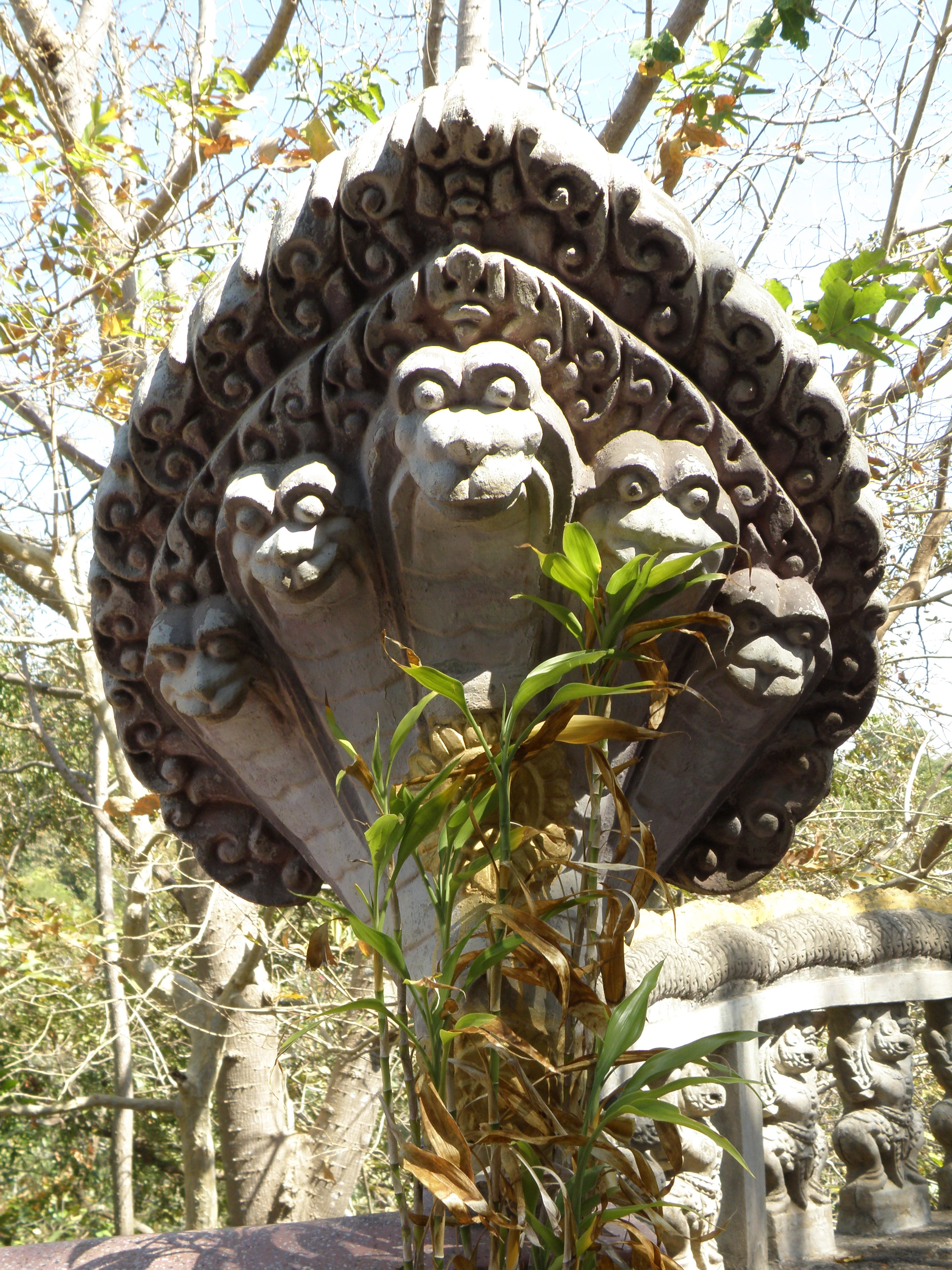
Naga sculpture along the staircase of Phnom Oudong.

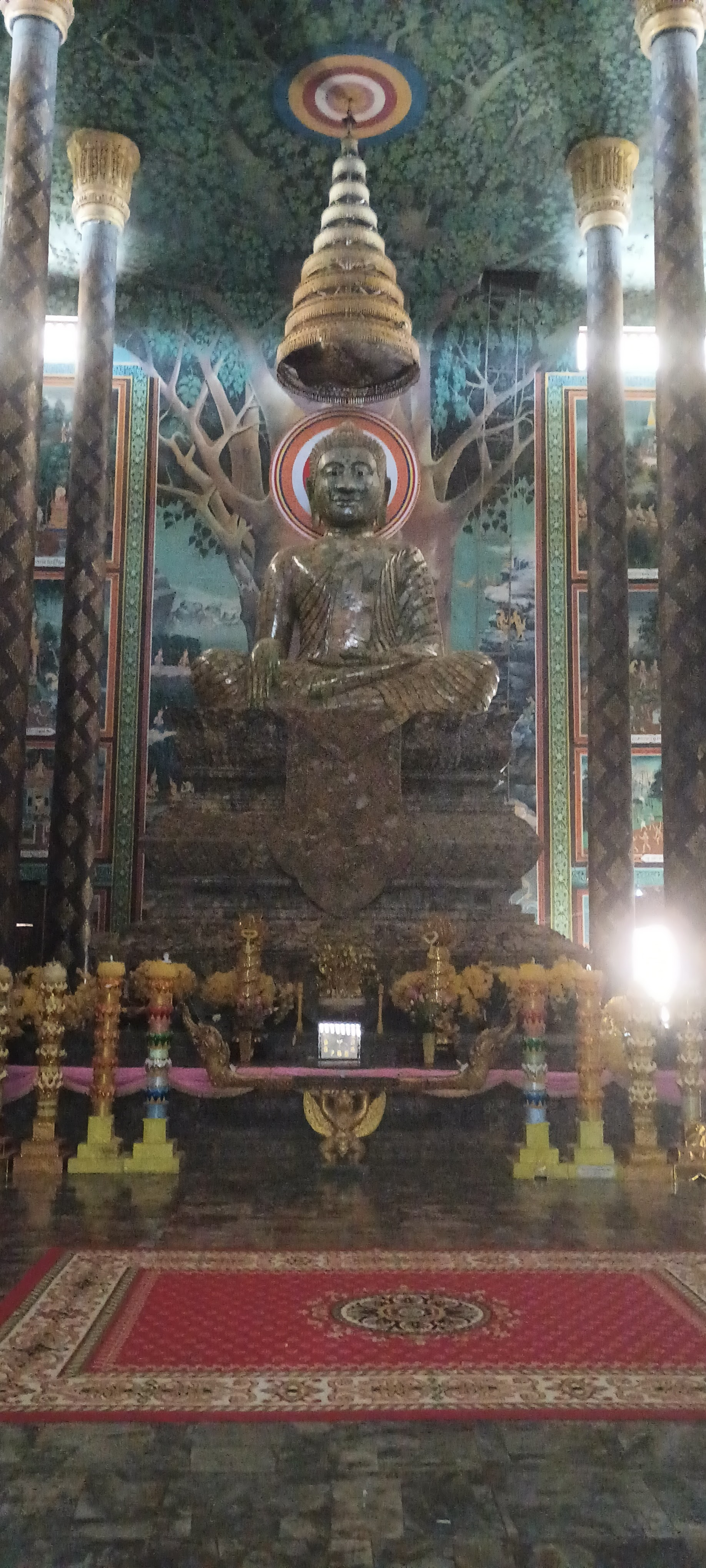
Buddha's sculpture inside the Prasat Nokor Vimean Sour, Oudong.

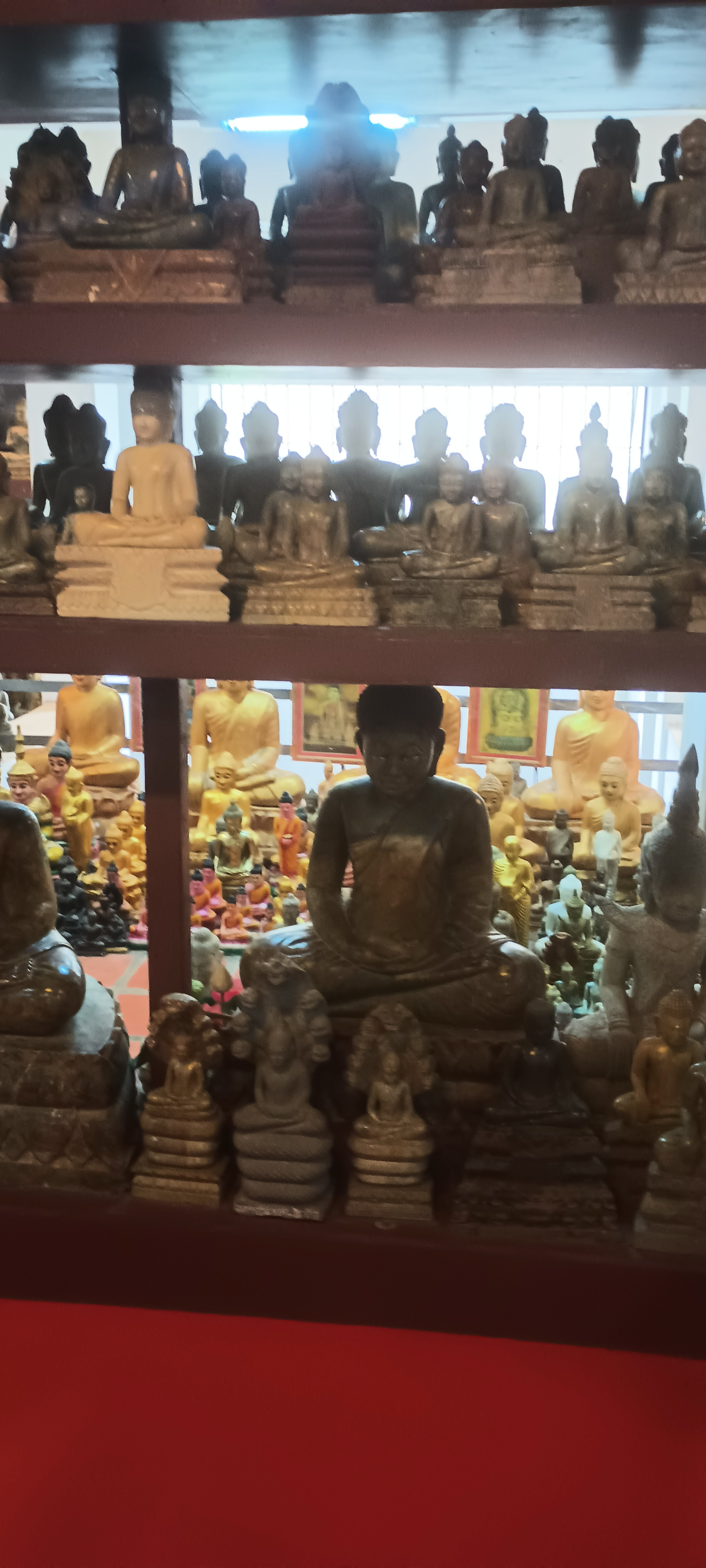
Collection of mini Buddha statues inside Prasat Nokor Vimean Sour, Oudong.

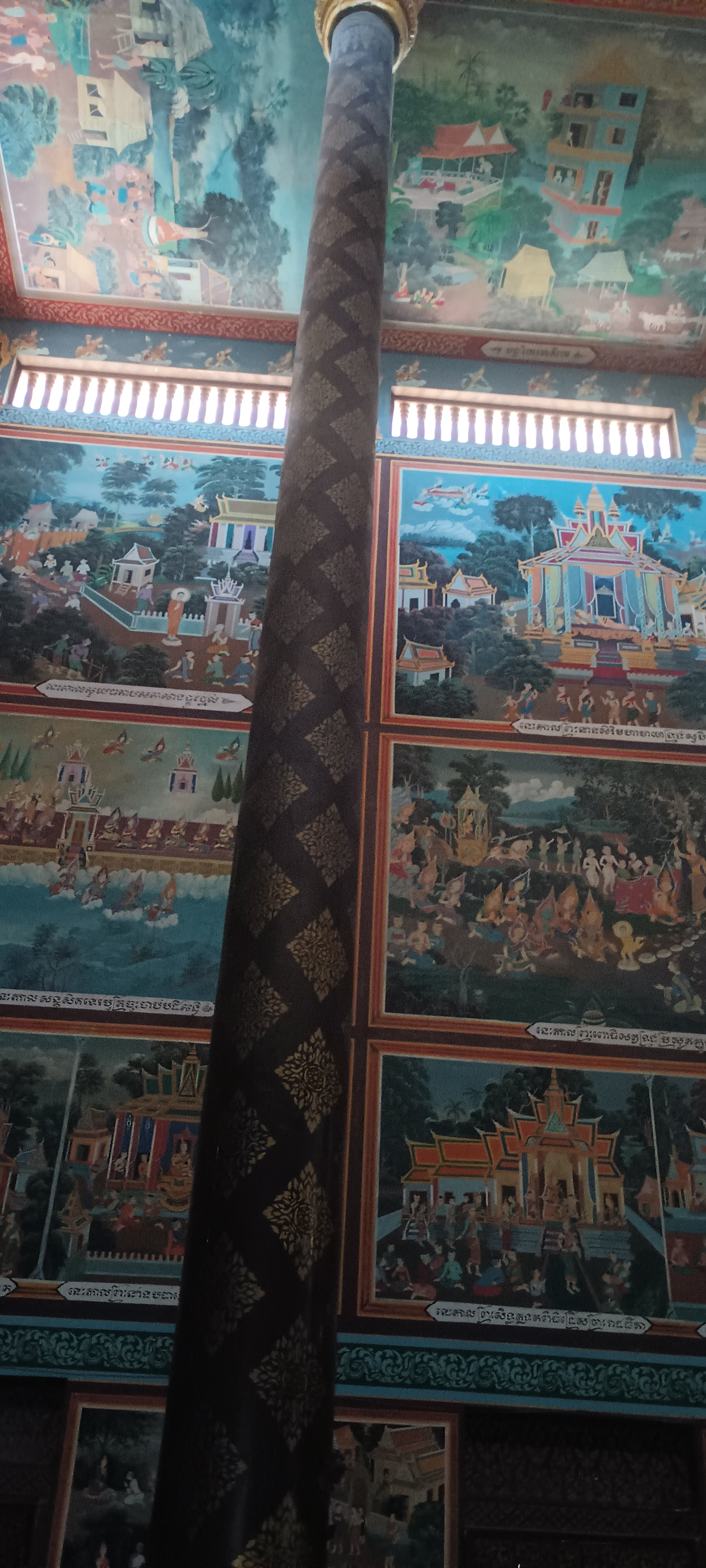
Painting inside Prasat Nokor Vimean Sour, Oudong.

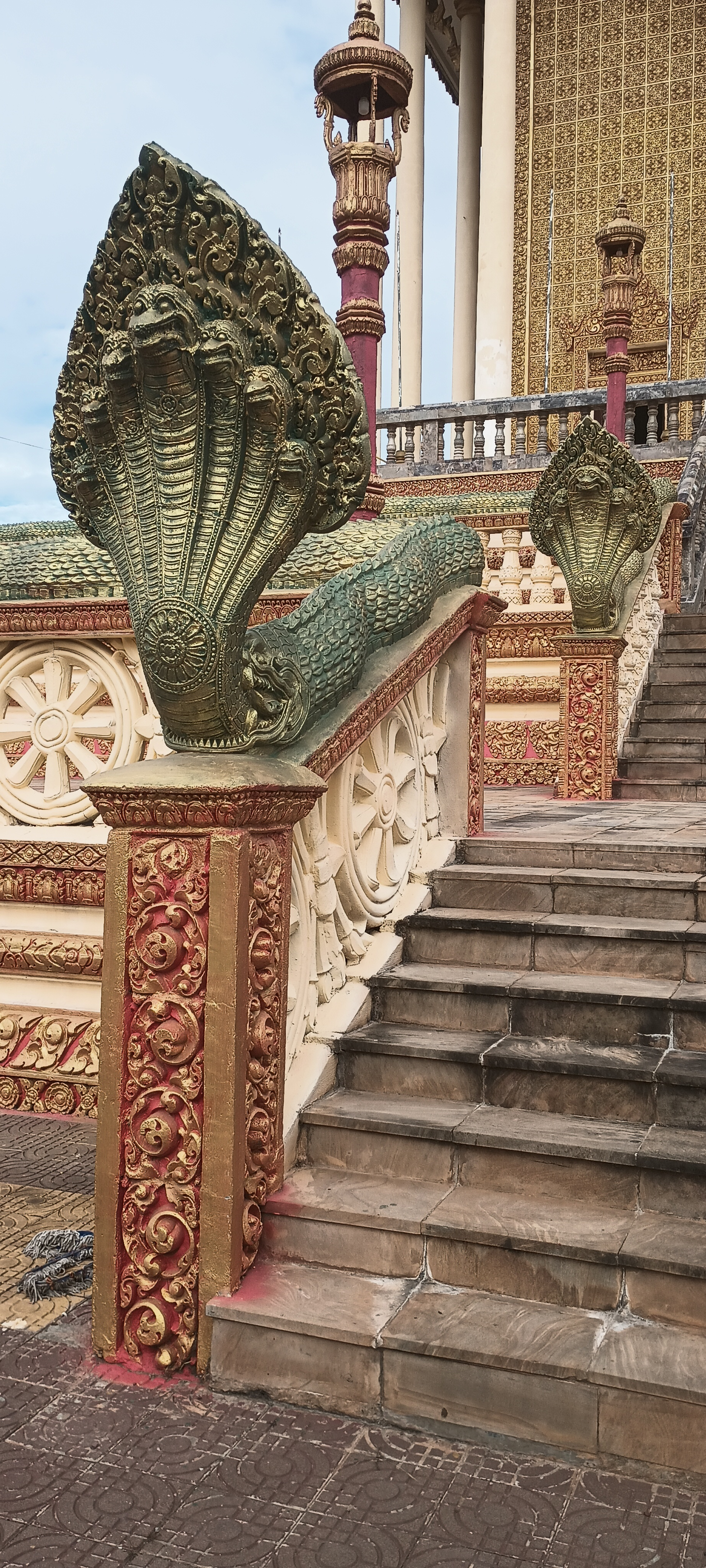
Naga and detail of Prasat Nokor Vimean Sour, Oudong.

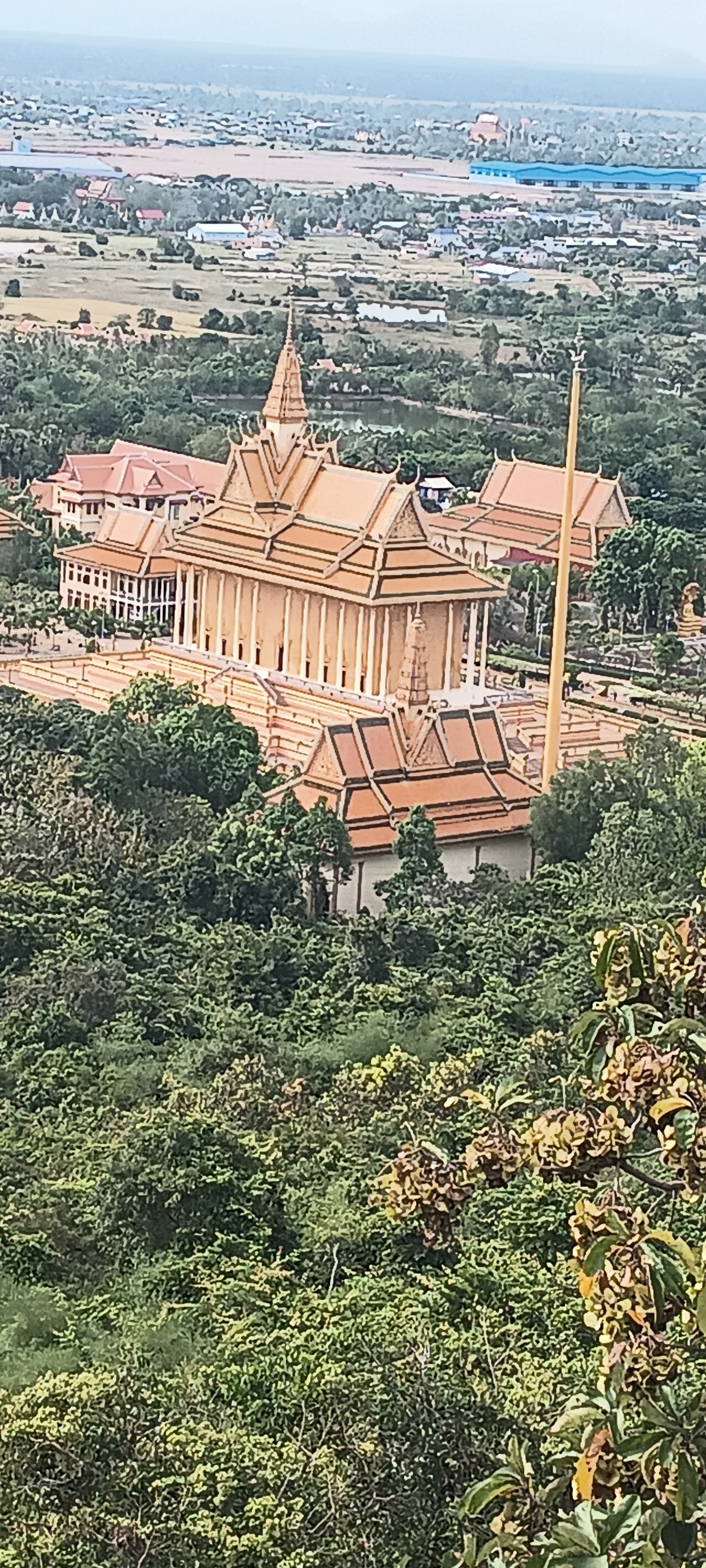
Prasat Nokor Vimean Sour from atop Phnom Oudong.

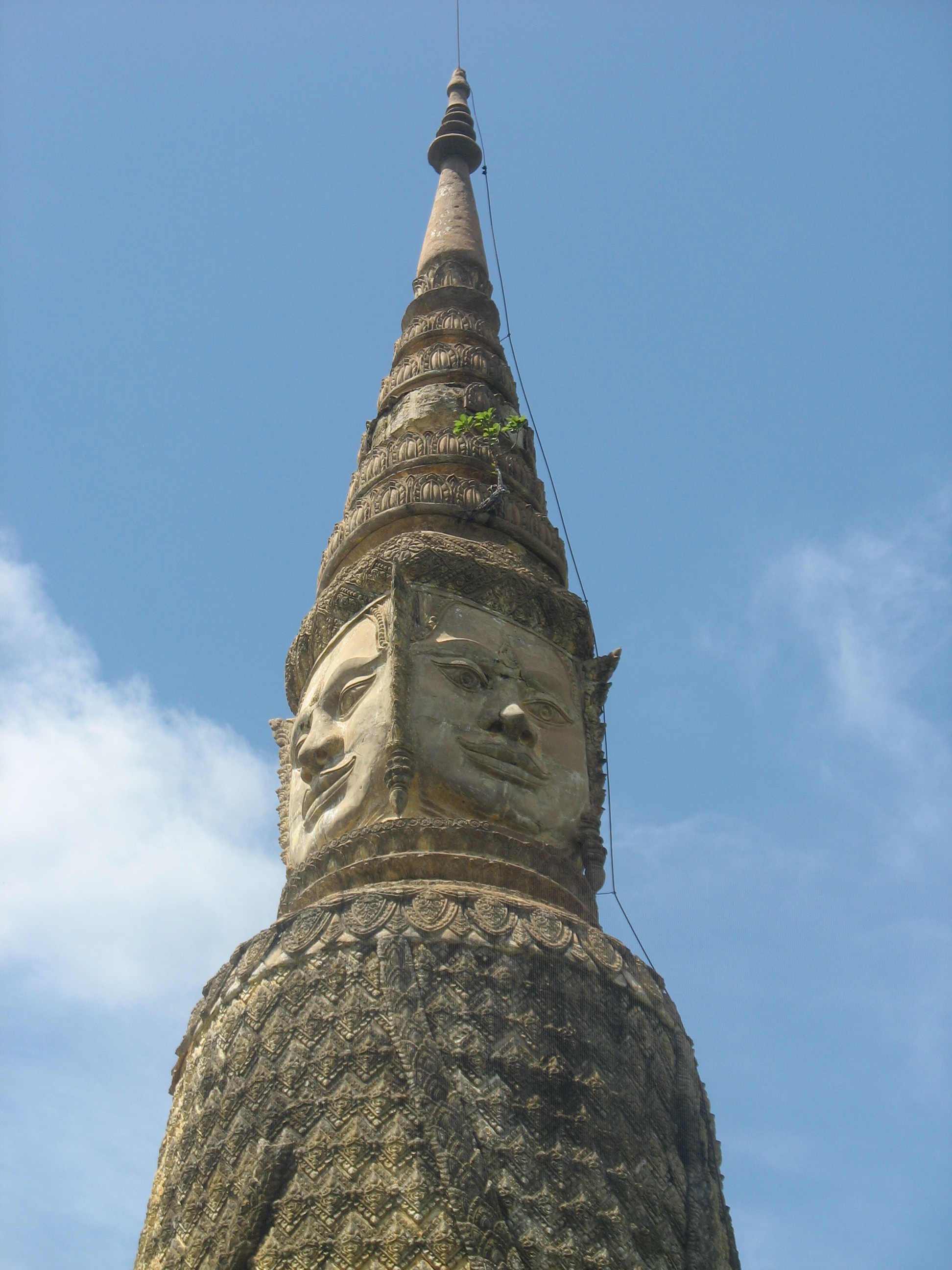
The four-faced spire of Chet Dey Mak Proum.

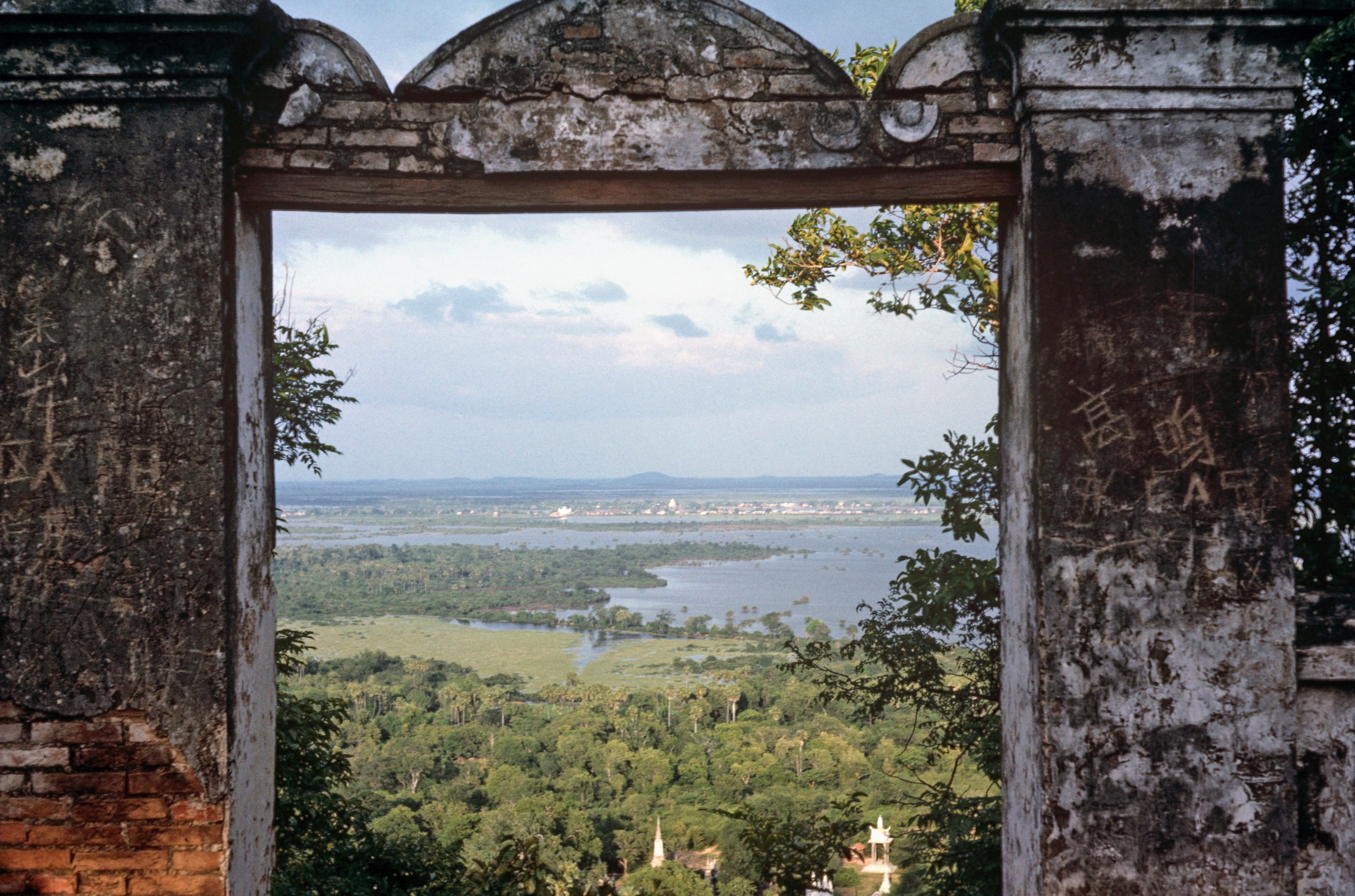
View from Oudong hill overlooking the surrounding plains and waterways.

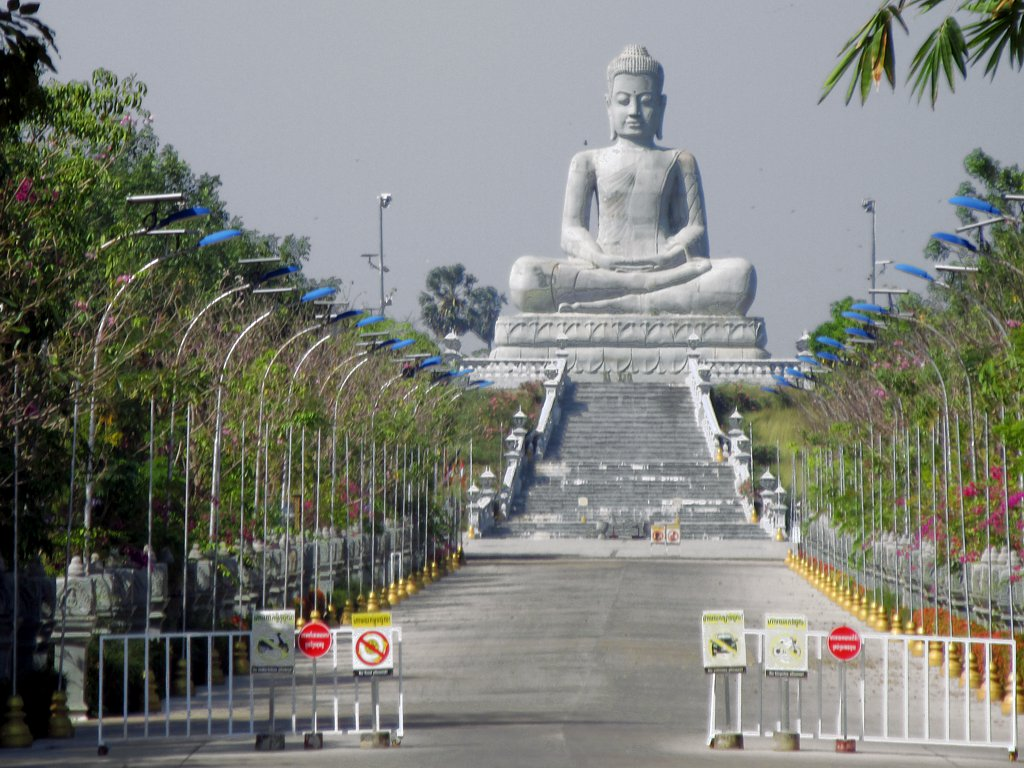
The massive seated Buddha statue at the base of the Oudong Monastery.

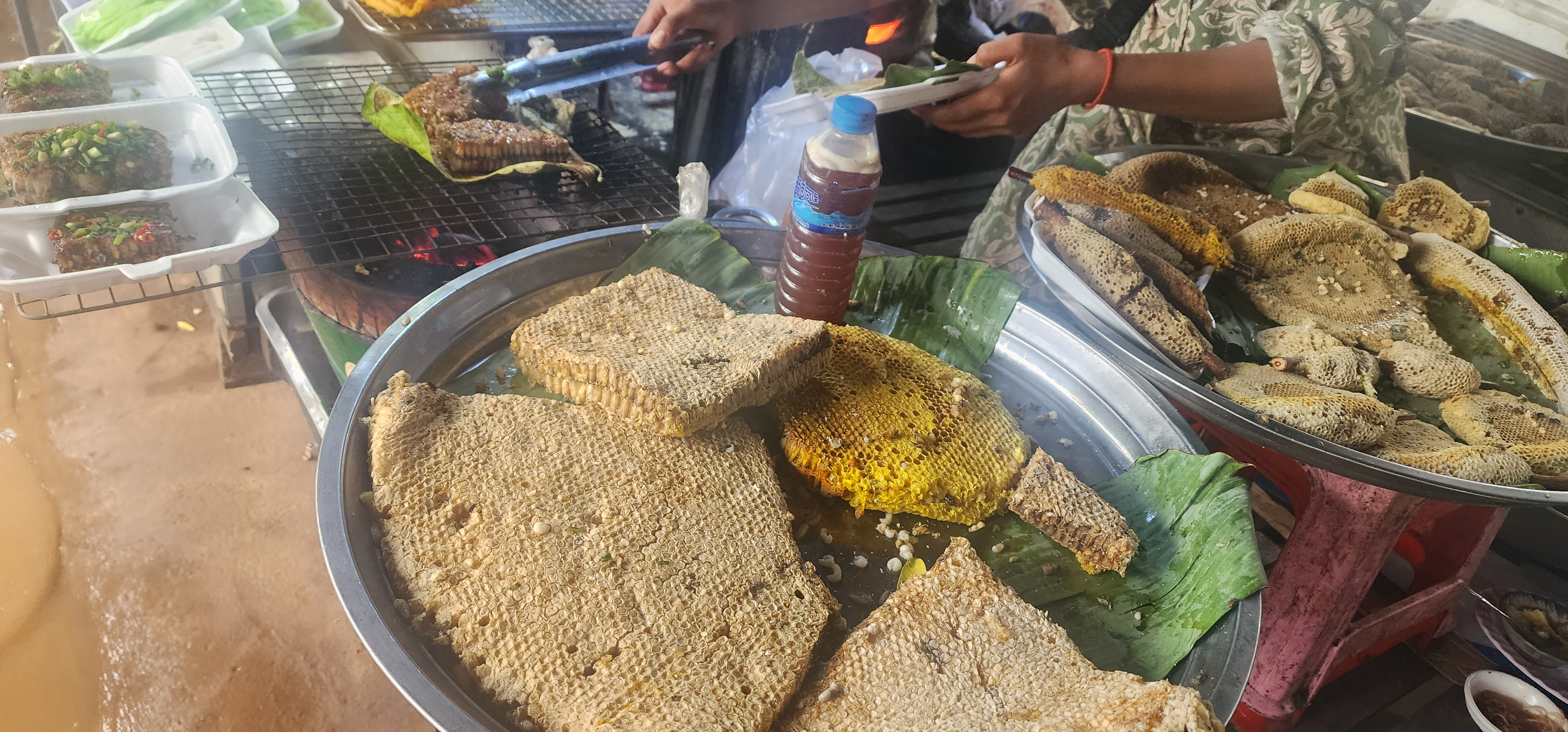
Grilled honeycombs with larvae sold at the local market near the hill.

== See also ==
- Oudong
- Oudong District
- Kampong Speu province
