= Ponhea Lueu District =

Ponhea Leur ស្រុកពញាឮ
- District (srok)
- Location in Cambodia
- Coordinates: 11°48′56″N 104°47′57″E
- Country: Cambodia
- Province: Kandal
- Communes: 14
- Villages: 141

Population (1998)
  - Total: 95,087
- Time zone: +7
- Geocode: 0809

Ponhea Lueu District (Khmer: ស្រុកពញាឮ) is a district (srok) of Kandal Province, Cambodia. The district is subdivided into 14 communes (khum) such as Chhveang, Chrey Loas, Kampong Luong, Kampong Os, Kaoh Chen, Phnum Bat, Ponhea Lueu, Ponhea Pon, Preaek Pnov, Preaek Ta Teaen, Phsar Daek, Samraong, Tumnob Thum, Vihear Luong and 141 villages (phum). In the northern part of the district, near the border between Kampong Speu and Kampong Chhnang is the old royal capital of Oudong.
