= Leuk Daek District =

Leuk Daek ស្រុកលើកដែក
- District (srok)
- Location in Cambodia
- Coordinates: 11°10′25″N 105°13′43″E
- Country: Cambodia
- Province: Kandal
- Communes: 7
- Villages: 24

Population (1998)
  - Total: 52,976
- Time zone: +7
- Geocode: 0805

Leuk Daek District (Khmer: ស្រុកលើកដែក) is a district (srok) of Kandal Province, Cambodia. The district is subdivided into 7 communes (khum) (Kampong Phnum, K'am Samnar, Khpob Ateav, Peam Reang, Preaek Dach, Preaek Tonloab, Sandar) and 24 villages (phum).
