= List of Cambodian provinces by Human Development Index =

This is a list of provinces of Cambodia by Human Development Index as of 2023, including the autonomous municipality of Phnom Penh. Some provinces are grouped together and their aggregate HDI are calculated.

Rank	Province	HDI (2023)
high human development
1	Phnom Penh	0.702
Medium human development
2	Banteay Meanchey	0.642
3	Takéo	0.635
4	Kampong Chhnang	0.623
5	Siem Reap/Oddar Meanchey	0.612
6	Prey Veng	0.609
7	Svay Rieng	0.608
–	Cambodia (average)	0.606
8	Kandal	0.605
9	Battambang/Pailin	0.601
10	Kampot/Kep/Sihanoukville	0.580
11	Preah Vihear/Steung Treng/Kratié	0.579
12	Kampong Thom	0.562
13	Koh Kong	0.554
14	Kampong Cham/Tbong Khmum	0.551
Low human development
15	Mondulkiri/Ratanakiri	0.539
16	Pursat	0.534
17	Kampong Speu	0.505
