= Amleang =

Town in Kampong Speu Province, Cambodia

Coordinates: 11°48′0″N 104°20′0″E

Amleang (Khmer: អមលាំង) is the largest town in Thpong District of Kampong Speu Province, Cambodia. In 1998, its population was 8,215. The Communist Party of Kampuchea once had their headquarters and a liaison committee based in Amleang.
