= Thpong District =

District in Kampong Speu, Cambodia

Coordinates: 11°44′N 104°26′E

Thpong District (Khmer: ស្រុកថ្ពង) is a district (srok) located in Kampong Speu Province in central Cambodia.

== Geography ==
The district is located in central Cambodia. Neighbouring districts are (from the east clockwise) Odongk, Samraong Tong and Aoral. To the north are the districts Tuek Phos and Sameakki Mean Chey of Kampong Chhnang Province.

== Administration ==
Thpong District is subdivided into 7 communes (khum)

Geocode	Name
050801	Amleang	អមលាំង
050802	Monourom	មនោរម្យ
050804	Prambei Mom	ប្រាំបីមុម
050805	Rung Roeang	រុងរឿង
050806	Toap Mean	ទ័ពមាន
050807	Veal Pon	វាលពន់
050808	Yea Angk	យាអង្គ
