= Angk Snuol District =

Angk Snuol អង្គស្នួល
- District
- Location in Cambodia
- Coordinates: 11°29′30″N 104°39′22″E
- Country: Cambodia
- Province: Kandal
- Communes: 16
- Villages: 307

Population (1998)
  - Total: 88,921
- Time zone: UTC+07:00 (ICT)
- Geocode: 0808

Angk Snuol (Khmer: អង្គស្នួល [ʔɑŋ snuəl]) is a district (srok) of Kandal Province, Cambodia. The district is subdivided into 16 communes (khum) such as Baek Chan, Boeng Thum, Chhak Chheu Neang, Damnak Ampil, Kamboul, Kantaok, Krang Mkak, Lumhach, Mkak, Ovlaok, Peuk, Ponsang, Prey Puok, Samraong Leu, Snao, Tuol Prech and 307 villages (phum).
