= Udong =

Udong may refer to:

- Oudong, the former capital of Cambodia
- Oudong Me Chey, a town in Cambodia
- U-dong, Haeundae District, Busan, South Korea
- Udong (food), a Japanese-style udon noodle soup
- Odong, a Filipino noodle dish with sardines and tomato sauce
