= Samraong Tong District =

Samraong Tong ស្រុកសំរោងទង
- District (srok)
- Location in Cambodia
- Coordinates: 11°28′N 104°32′E
- Country: Cambodia
- Province: Kampong Speu
- Communes: 15
- Villages: 257

Population (2019)
  - Total: 182,774
  - Density: 249/km^{2} (640/sq mi)
- Time zone: +7
- Geocode: 0507

Samraong Tong District (Khmer: ស្រុកសំរោងទង) is a district located in Kampong Speu Province in central Cambodia. The district has a land area of about 734.1 km². The annual population change from 2008 to 2019 is about 2.3%

== Administration ==
Khum (Commune) Khmer: ឃុំ	Phum (Villages) Khmer: ភូមិ
រលាំងចក	19
កាហែង	15
ខ្ទុំក្រាង	14
ព្នាយ	20
រលាំងគ្រើល	26
សំរោងទង	18
សំបូរ	18
សែនដី	21
ស្គុះ	21
តាំងក្រូច	17
ធម្មតាអរ	21
ត្រពាំងគង	29
ទំព័រមាស	13
វល្លិសរ	23
ក្រាំងអំពិល	15
សរុប	257
