= Arey Ksat =

City in Kandal province

Coordinates: 11°34′14″N 104°57′35″E

Arey Ksat អរិយក្សត្រ
- City
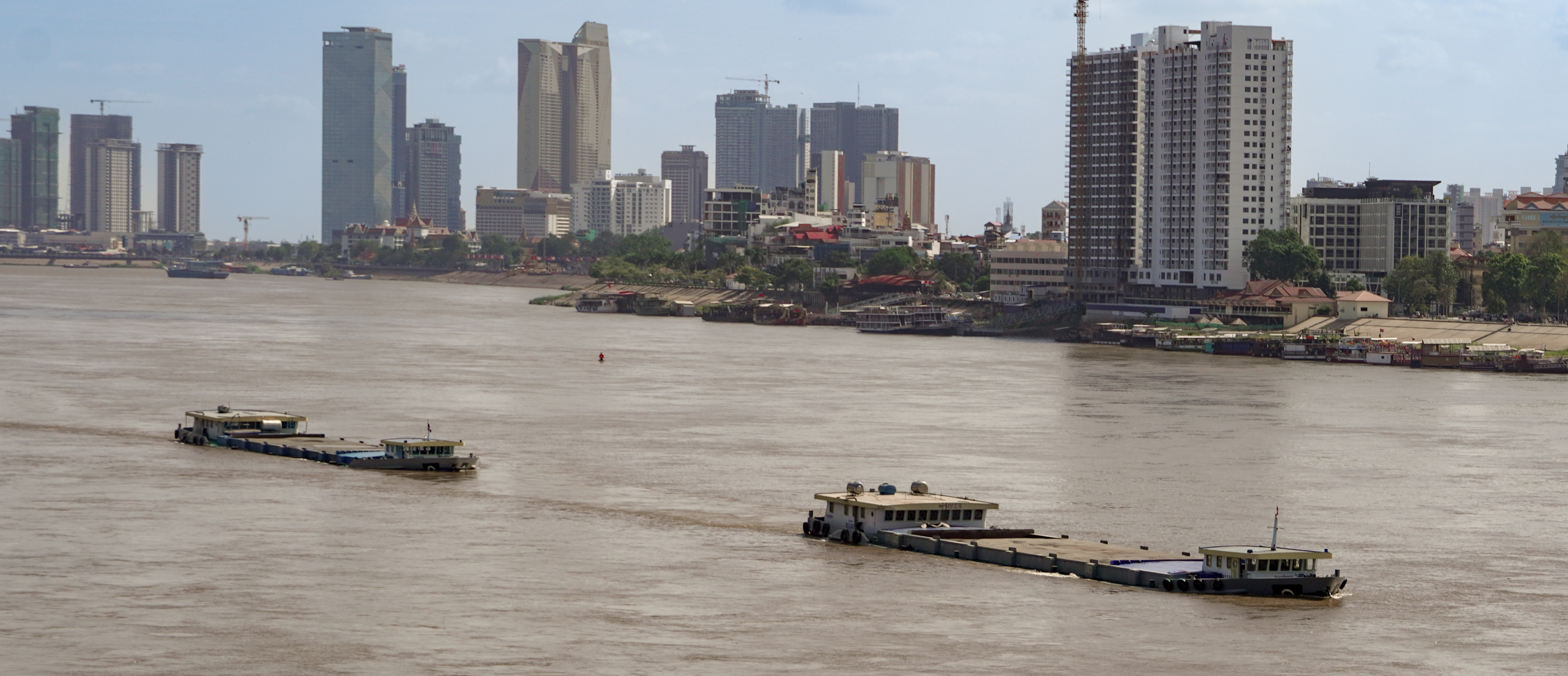

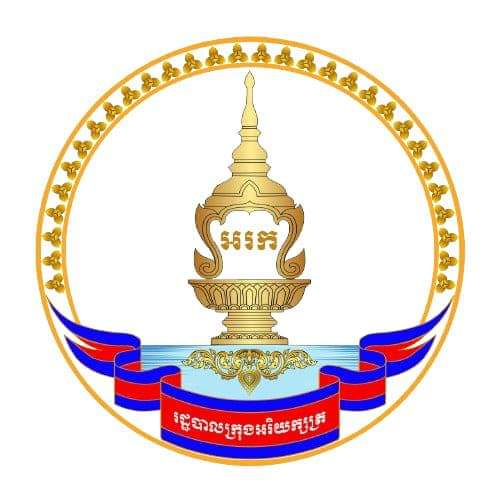
- Seal
- Interactive map of Arey Ksat
- Country: Cambodia
- Province: Kandal
- Municipality: Arey Ksat
- Established: 23 December 2022
- Divided from: Khsach Kandal District and Lvea Aem District

Government
  - Type: City municipality
  - Mayor: Chan Tara (CPP)

Area
  - Total: 199.31 km^{2} (76.95 sq mi)
- Elevation: 15 m (49 ft)

Population (2019)
  - Total: 73,764
- Time zone: UTC+7 (ITC)
- Geocode: 000813

Arey Ksat (Khmer: ក្រុងអរិយក្សត្រ, Krŏng Ărĕy Ksăt, Khmer pronunciation: [krɔŋ ʔaˈrej ksɑːt]) is a city (ក្រុង) in Kandal province, Cambodia. It was established on 23 December 2022 by sub‑decree of the Royal Government of Cambodia. The city consists of communes that were separated from parts of Khsach Kandal District and Lvea Aem District.

== History ==
Arey Ksat was officially created as a municipality on 23 December 2022, along with several other new cities in Kandal and neighboring provinces, through a national government sub‑decree reorganizing parts of existing districts.

== Geography ==
Arey Ksat lies within the central lowland plains of Kandal province near the outskirts of the Phnom Penh metropolitan region. The terrain is predominantly flat and part of the greater Mekong floodplain. The average elevation of the area is low, typical of the surrounding agricultural plains in southern Cambodia.

== Demographic ==
As of the 2019 Cambodian general population census, the total population of the communes that now form Arey Ksat was approximately 73,764.

The population is predominantly ethnic Khmer, and Buddhism is the main religion. Most residents live in rural or semi‑urban villages, with livelihoods centered around agriculture, local markets, and small enterprises.

The population of each commune is as follows:

Population of each division in Arey Ksat City
Communes (Sangkat)	Romanization	Population
សង្កាត់បាក់ដាវ	Sangkat Bak Dao	4,099
សង្កាត់កោះឧកញ៉ាតី	Sangkat Koh Oknha Tey	5,958
សង្កាត់ព្រែកអំពិល	Sangkat Prek Ampil	12,258
សង្កាត់ព្រែកលួង	Sangkat Prek Luong	5,008
សង្កាត់ព្រែកតាកូវ	Sangkat Prek Takov	7,901
សង្កាត់ស្វាយជ្រុំ	Sangkat Svay Chrum	4,372
សង្កាត់អរិយក្សត្រ	Sangkat Arey Ksat	10,077
សង្កាត់សារិកាកែវ	Sangkat Sarika Keo	8,912
សង្កាត់ពាមឧកញ៉ាអុង	Sangkat Peam Oknha Ong	8,189
សង្កាត់ព្រែកក្មេង	Sangkat Prek Kmeng	3,352
សង្កាត់បារុង	Sangkat Barong	3,638

== Administration ==
Arey Ksat City consists of eleven communes:

- សង្កាត់បាក់ដាវ (Sangkat Bak Dao)
- សង្កាត់កោះឧកញ៉ាតី (Sangkat Koh Oknha Tey)
- សង្កាត់ព្រែកអំពិល (Sangkat Prek Ampil)
- សង្កាត់ព្រែកលួង (Sangkat Prek Luong)
- សង្កាត់ព្រែកតាកូវ (Sangkat Prek Takov)
- សង្កាត់ស្វាយជ្រុំ (Sangkat Svay Chrum)
- សង្កាត់អរិយក្សត្រ (Sangkat Arey Ksat)
- សង្កាត់សារិកាកែវ (Sangkat Sarika Keo)
- សង្កាត់ពាមឧកញ៉ាអុង (Sangkat Peam Oknha Ong)
- សង្កាត់ព្រែកក្មេង (Sangkat Prek Kmeng)
- សង្កាត់បារុង (Sangkat Barong)

== Transportation ==
Arey Ksat is connected to the surrounding region by provincial roads and routes that link it to Phnom Penh and neighboring districts.
