= Chbar Mon Municipality =

Chbar Mon Municipality ក្រុងច្បារមន Krong Chbar Mon
- Municipality

- Location in Cambodia
- Coordinates: 11°27′N 104°30′E
- Country: Cambodia
- Province: Kampong Speu
- Capital: Chbar Mon

Government
  - Mayor: Soeur Soknal

Population (2019)
  - Total: 50,359
- Time zone: UTC+07:00 (ICT)
- Geocode: 0502

Chbar Mon Municipality (Khmer: ក្រុងច្បារមន, lit. 'The Mourn Farm') is a municipality (krong) located in Kampong Speu province in central Cambodia. The provincial capital Chbar Mon town is located within the municipality.

== Etymology ==
Chbar Mon (ច្បារមន) means "mulberry garden" in Khmer. It composes of Chbar (ច្បារ) meaning "garden", and mon (មន) meaning "mulberry".

== Administration ==
Chbar Mon Municipality is subdivided into 5 quarters (sangkats).

Sangkat (Quarter)
Chbar Mon
Kandaol Dom
Roka Thum
Sopoar Tep
Svay Kravan
