= Sompov Poun Municipality =

Sompov Poun Municipality ក្រុងសំពៅពូន
- Municipality
- Krong Sompov Poun
- Interactive map of Sompov Poun Municipality
- Coordinates: 10.962943°N 105.066688°E
- Country: Cambodia
- Province: Kandal
- Quarters: 5
- Villages: 53
- Established: 23 December 2022

Government
  - Type: City municipality
  - Mayor: Eng Sovichet (CPP)

Population (2019)
  - Total: 48,151
- Time zone: UTC+7 (ICT)
- Geocode: 000812

Sampov Poun Municipality (Khmer: ក្រុងសំពៅពូន) is a municipality (krong) in Kandal Province, Cambodia. The municipality was established by sub-decree through the reorganization of parts of Koh Thom District.

== Communes and Villages ==
Communes and Villages of Sompov Poun Municipality
#	Geocode	Communes (Sangkats)	Romanization	# of Villages (Phum)
1	081201	សង្កាត់ព្រែកជ្រៃ	Sangkat Prek Chrey	11
2	081202	សង្កាត់ឈើខ្មៅ	Sangkat Chhoeu Khmao	7
3	081203	សង្កាត់ព្រែកស្ពឺ	Sangkat Prek Speu	15
4	081204	សង្កាត់ជ្រោយតាកែវ	Sangkat Chroy Takeo	9
5	081205	សង្កាត់សំពៅពូន	Sangkat Sompov Puon	11
