= Arey Ksat Municipality =

Arey Ksat Municipality ក្រុងអរិយក្សត្រ
- Municipality
- Krong Arey Ksat
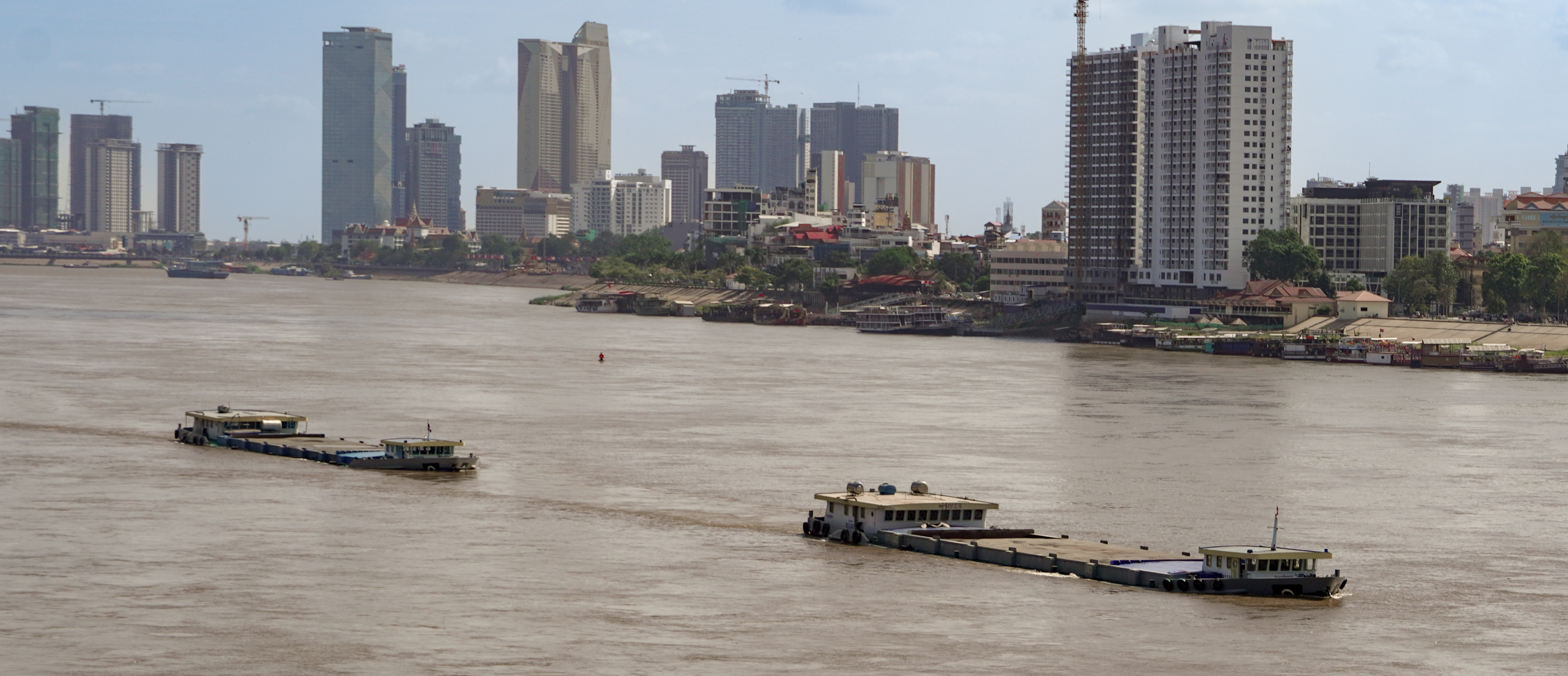

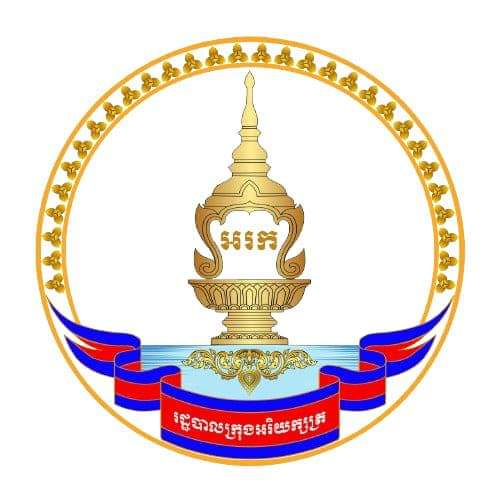
- Seal
- Interactive map of Arey Ksat Municipality
- Coordinates: 11°34′12.7″N 104°57′33.9″E
- Country: Cambodia
- Province: Kandal
- Quarters: 11
- Villages: 42
- Established: 23 December 2022

Government
  - Type: Mayor municipality
  - Mayor: Chan Tara (CPP)

Population (2019)
  - Total: 73,764
- Time zone: UTC+7 (ICT)
- Postal code: 081300
- Geocode: 0813

Arey Ksat Municipality (Khmer: ក្រុងអរិយក្សត្រ) is a municipality in Kandal province, Cambodia. It was established on 23 December 2022 as part of the nationwide administrative reform.

== Communes and Villages ==
Communes and Villages of Arey Ksat Municipality
| # | Postal code | Communes (Sangkats) | Romanization | # of Villages (Phums) |
|---|---|---|---|---|
| 1 | 081301 | សង្កាត់បាក់ដាវ | Sangkat Bak Dao | 4 |
| 2 | 081302 | សង្កាត់កោះឧកញ៉ាតី | Sangkat Koh Oknha Tey | 5 |
| 3 | 081303 | សង្កាត់ព្រែកអំពិល | Sangkat Prek Ampil | 7 |
| 4 | 081304 | សង្កាត់ព្រែកលួង | Sangkat Prek Luong | 4 |
| 5 | 081305 | សង្កាត់ព្រែកតាកូវ | Sangkat Prek Takov | 3 |
| 6 | 081306 | សង្កាត់ស្វាយជ្រុំ | Sangkat Svay Chrum | 3 |
| 7 | 081307 | សង្កាត់អរិយក្សត្រ | Sangkat Arey Ksat | 4 |
| 8 | 081308 | សង្កាត់សារិកាកែវ | Sangkat Sarika Keo | 3 |
| 9 | 081309 | សង្កាត់ពាមឧកញ៉ាអុង | Sangkat Peam Oknha Ong | 3 |
| 10 | 081310 | សង្កាត់ព្រែកក្មេង | Sangkat Prek Kmeng | 5 |
| 11 | 081311 | សង្កាត់បារុង | Sangkat Barong | 2 |
