= Chbar Mon (town) =

Chbar Mon ច្បារមន
- City
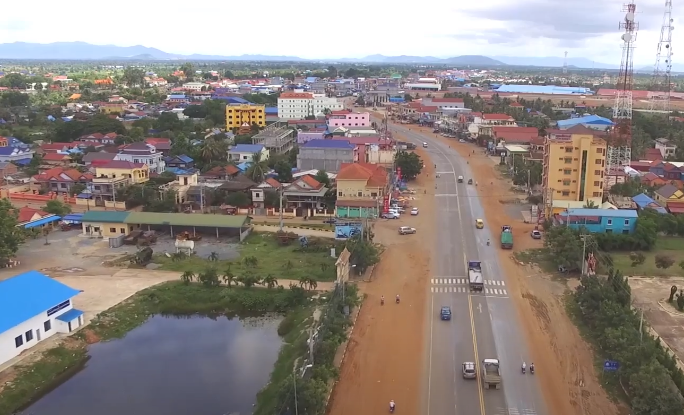

- Location within Cambodia
- Coordinates: 11°27′N 104°30′E
- Country: Cambodia
- Province: Kampong Speu
- Municipality: Chbar Mon
- Elevation: 39 m (128 ft)

Population (2019)
  - Total: 50,359
- Time zone: UTC+7 (ICT)

Chbar Mon (Khmer: ច្បារមន) is the capital of Kampong Speu Province in central Cambodia.

Most of the townspeople speak only Khmer, but some are conversant in Mandarin (They can usually be found employed by the small coffeeshops/restaurants or shops).

The center of the town hosts a market, surrounded by bicycle shops, a dispensary and small restaurants. There is a guesthouse just minutes away for travelers.

Chbar Mon has numerous privately run schools and orphanages run by social and missionary organizations from Singapore, the Philippines and other countries.

== Climate ==
Climate data for Chbar Mon (1982–2024)
Month	Jan	Feb	Mar	Apr	May	Jun	Jul	Aug	Sep	Oct	Nov	Dec	Year
Mean daily maximum °C (°F)	31.9 (89.4)	32.7 (90.9)	33.6 (92.5)	34.8 (94.6)	34.9 (94.8)	34.2 (93.6)	33.6 (92.5)	33.4 (92.1)	32.0 (89.6)	32.4 (90.3)	31.8 (89.2)	31.1 (88.0)	33.0 (91.5)
Mean daily minimum °C (°F)	21.6 (70.9)	22.5 (72.5)	23.3 (73.9)	24.0 (75.2)	23.5 (74.3)	24.0 (75.2)	24.5 (76.1)	23.9 (75.0)	23.7 (74.7)	23.6 (74.5)	23.8 (74.8)	22.4 (72.3)	23.4 (74.1)
Average precipitation mm (inches)	32.3 (1.27)	13.4 (0.53)	53.2 (2.09)	95.0 (3.74)	126.4 (4.98)	122.3 (4.81)	118.0 (4.65)	146.0 (5.75)	235.6 (9.28)	212.1 (8.35)	115.3 (4.54)	23.3 (0.92)	1,292.9 (50.91)
Source: World Meteorological Organization
