= Kaoh Thum District =

Kaoh Thum ស្រុកកោះធំ
- District (srok)
- Location in Cambodia
- Coordinates: 11°7′34″N 105°3′26″E
- Country: Cambodia
- Province: Kandal
- Communes: 11
- Villages: 93

Population (1998)
  - Total: 136,542
- Time zone: +7
- Geocode: 0804

Kaoh Thum District (Khmer: ស្រុកកោះធំ) is a district (srok) of Kandal Province, Cambodia. The district is subdivided into 11 communes (khum) such as Chheu Khmau, Chrouy Ta Kaev, Kampong Kong, Kaoh Thum Ka, Kaoh Thum Kha, Leuk Daek, Preaek Chrey, Preaek Sdei, Preaek Thmei, Sampovpoun, Pouthi Ban and 93 villages (phum).
