= Oudong District =

Odongk ស្រុកឧដុង្គ
- District (srok)
- Location in Cambodia
- Coordinates: 11°41′N 104°42′E
- Country: Cambodia
- Province: Kampong Speu
- Communes: 15
- Villages: 251

Population (2019)
  - Total: 145,311
- Time zone: +7
- Geocode: 0505

Odongk District (Khmer: ស្រុកឧដុង្គ) is a district located in Kampong Speu Province in central Cambodia.

== Administration ==
Odongk District is subdivided into 15 communes (khum)

Khum (Commune)	Phum (Villages)

Geocode	Name
050501	Chant Saen Commune
050502	Cheung Roas Commune
050503	Chumpu Proeks Commune
050504	Khsem Khsan Commune
050505	Krang Chek Commune
050506	Mean Chey Commune
050507	Preah Srae Commune
050508	Prey Krasang Commune
050509	Trach Tong Commune
050510	Veal Pung Commune
050511	Veang Chas Commune
050512	Yutth Sameakki Commune
050513	Damnak Reang Commune
050514	Peang Lvea Commune
050515	Phnum Touch Commune
