= List of cities and towns in Cambodia =

Map of cities and rivers in Cambodia

This is a list of cities and towns in Cambodia.

== List of municipalities in Cambodia by population ==
The figures listed in the table below come from the 2018 Commune Database (CDB) of Cambodia, published by the National Committee for Sub-National Democratic Development (NCDD). These data are recorded differently to Cambodian census data and significant variations are to be expected between the two due to internal and external migration. The national census does not record population by city, rather by province. The only available method of estimating the population of a city is through the CDB, which is updated every two years.

For instance, the 2018 CDB suggests that 1,474,489 people were living in Phnom Penh municipality, whereas the 2019 census (which only preliminary results have been released for) suggests 2,129,371.

The figures listed in the table below are based on the most recently published Commune Database. However, the population in Phnom Penh and other major urban centers, such as Siem Reap, Battambang, and Sihanoukville will be underestimated; while the population in smaller provincial municipalities, particularly those on the border with Thailand, Laos and Vietnam, will be overestimated. The most accurate information is available in the 2019 census, which provides information on the de facto population i.e. the precise population at the time the census was recorded, rather than official data recorded in Commune offices. To date, no information disaggregated by city is available from any census.

The size of municipal populations is based upon the municipal area and there are other smaller urbanized towns in Cambodia with significant populations, which are part of larger districts, such as Poipet in Banteay Meanchey province. It is not really possible to estimate the population of these urban areas using the CDB.

=== Cities ===
Name	Province	Population	Image
Phnom Penh	Phnom Penh	2,281,951	
Siem Reap	Siem Reap	245,494	
Battambang	Battambang	119,251	
Serei Saophoan	Banteay Meanchey	99,019	
Poipet	Banteay Meanchey	98,934	
Ta Khmau	Kandal	75,629	
Sihanoukville	Sihanoukville	73,036	
Samraong	Oddar Meanchey	70,944	
Pursat	Pursat	58,355	
Kampong Thom	Kampong Thom	53,118	
Chbar Mon	Kampong Speu	50,359	
Bavet	Svay Rieng	43,783	
Doun Kaev	Takéo	43,402	
Svay Rieng	Svay Rieng	41,424	
Kampong Chhnang	Kampong Chhnang	41,080	
Kampong Cham	Kampong Cham	38,365	
Pailin	Pailin	37,393	
Prey Veng	Prey Veng	36,254	
Suong	Tboung Khmum	35,054	
Kampot	Kampot	32,053	
Banlung	Ratanakiri	30,399	
Khemarak Phoumin	Koh Kong	28,836	
Kratié	Kratié	28,317	
Preah Vihear	Preah Vihear	24,360	
Sen Monorom	Mondulkiri	13,195	
Kep	Kep	5,470	
Koh Rong	Sihanoukville	4,000	

== See also ==
- Administrative divisions of Cambodia
