= Koh Rong (town) =

Koh Rong ក្រុងកោះរ៉ុង
- City
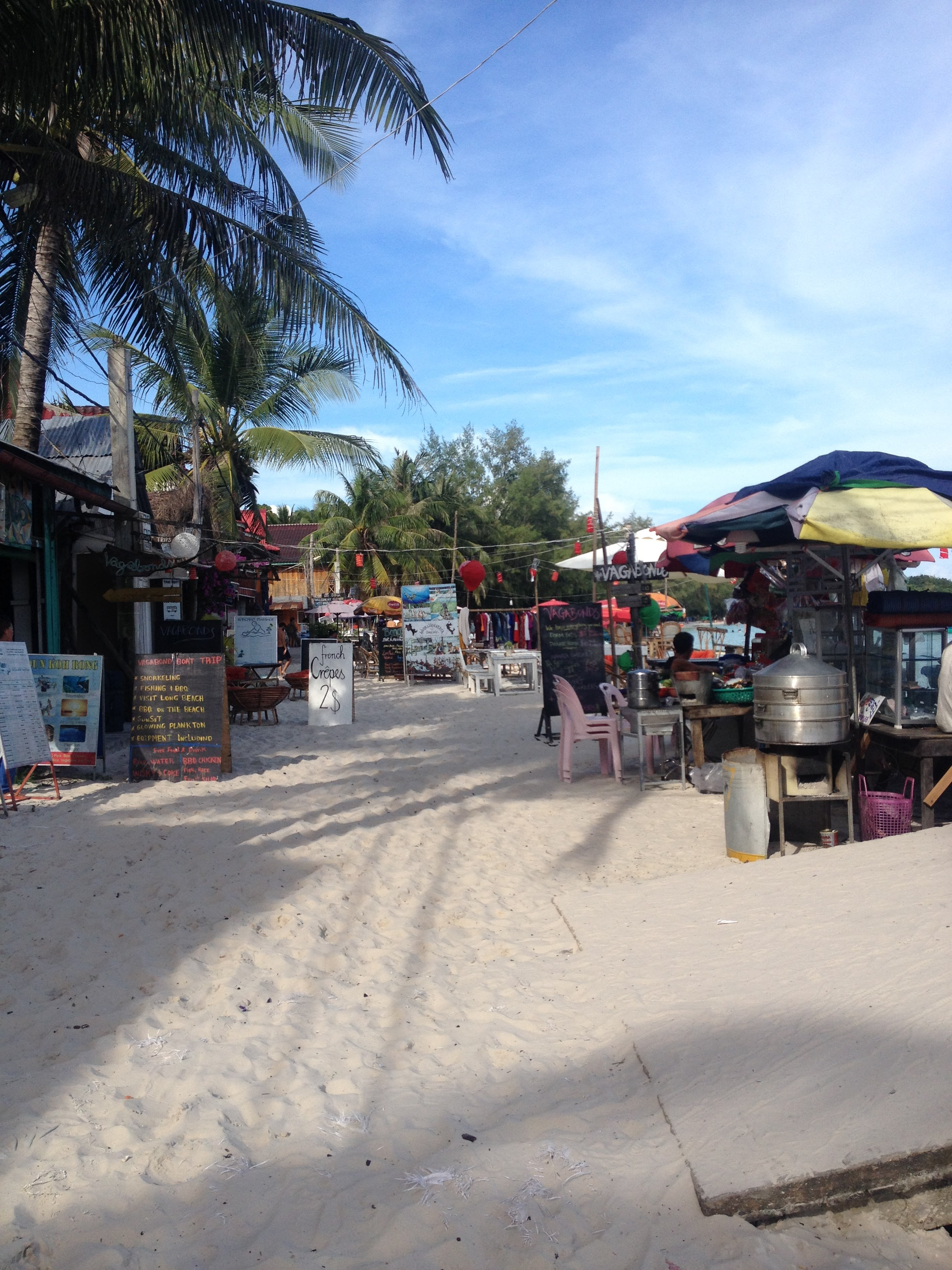

- Location within Cambodia
- Country: Cambodia
- Province: Sihanoukville
- Municipality: Sihanoukville
- City status: 31 January 2019

Government
  - Mayor: Nuon Bunthol (CPP)

Area
  - Total: 102.5 km^{2} (39.6 sq mi)

Population (2019)
  - Total: 4,000
  - Density: 39/km^{2} (100/sq mi)
- Time zone: UTC+07:00 (ICT)

Koh Rong (Khmer: កោះរ៉ុង) is a coastal town in the Sihanoukville province of Cambodia. It was formed from the islands of Koh Rong and Koh Rong Sanloem by a sub-decree issued in January 2019. It has a population of around 4,000.
