= Ta Khmau municipality =

Ta Khmau តាខ្មៅ
- City and municipality
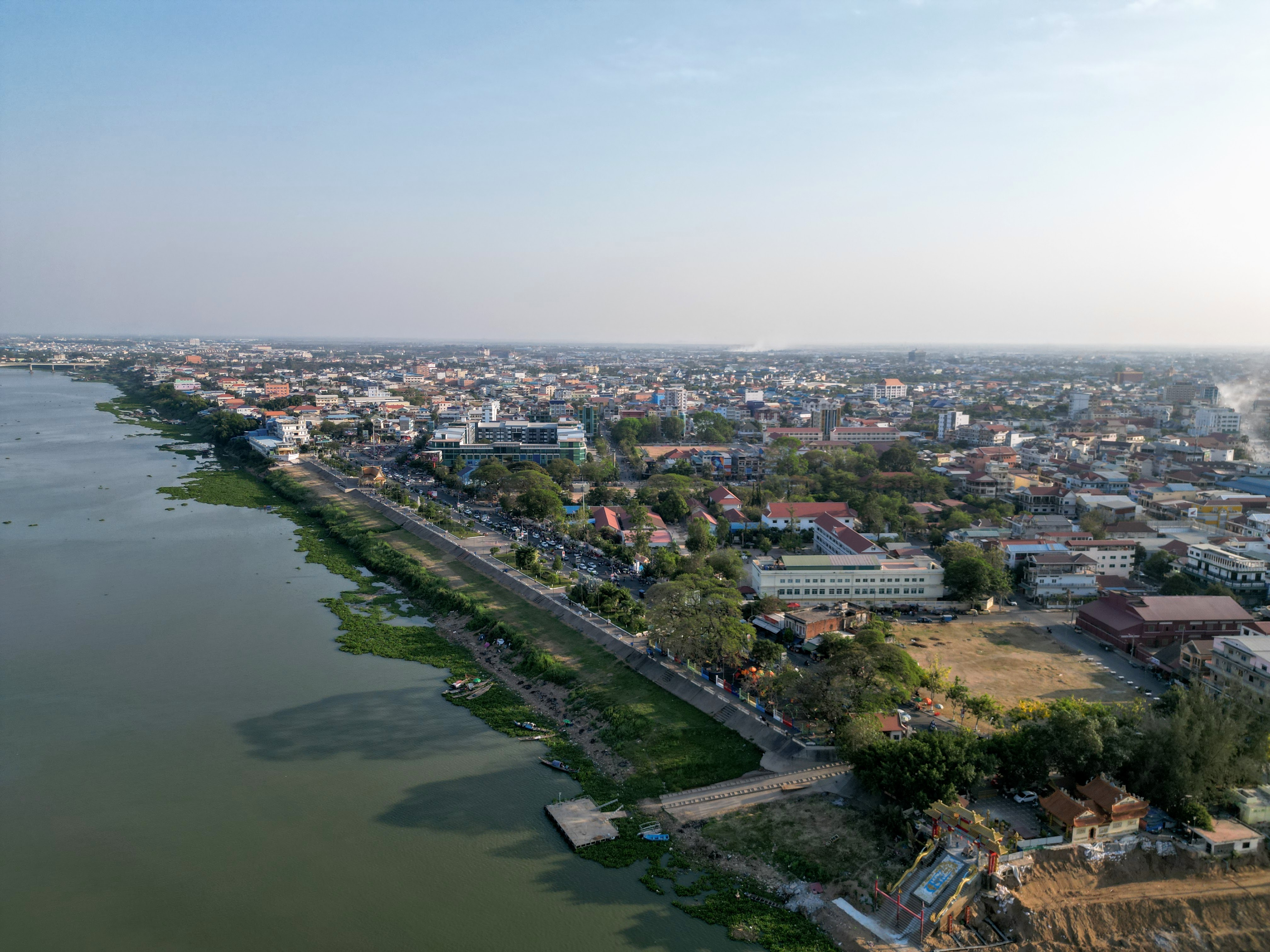
- Aerial View of Ta Khmau municipality

- Location within Cambodia
- Coordinates: 11°29′N 104°57′E
- Country: Cambodia
- Province: Kandal

Area
  - Total: 31 km^{2} (12 sq mi)
- Elevation: 5 m (16 ft)

Population (2019)
  - Total: 75,629
- Time zone: UTC+07:00 (ITC)

Ta Khmau (Khmer: តាខ្មៅ [taː kʰmaw]; lit. 'black grandpa') is the capital and largest city of Kandal province in central Cambodia. The city is about 11 km (7 mi) south of Phnom Penh (directly borders Phnom Penh).

== Administrative divisions ==
Ta Khmau is divided into 10 communes.

- Sangkat Kampong Samnanh (សង្កាត់កំពង់សំណាញ់)
- Sangkat Prek Hor (សង្កាត់ព្រែកហូរ)
- Sangkat Takdol (សង្កាត់តាក្តុល)
- Sangkat Ta Khmau (សង្កាត់តាខ្មៅ)
- Sangkat Daeum Mien (សង្កាត់ដើមមៀន)
- Sangkat Prek Russey (សង្កាត់ព្រែកឫស្សី)
- Sangkat Svay Rolum (សង្កាត់ស្វាយរលំ)
- Sangkat Kaoh Anlong Chen (សង្កាត់កោះអន្លង់ចិន)
- Sangkat Setbou (សង្កាត់សិត្បូ)
- Sangkat Roka Khpos (សង្កាត់រកាខ្ពស់)

== Education ==
Below are list of some institutions in Ta Khmau.

- Setbou High School
- Stueng Chrau Lower Secondary School
- Hun Sen Ta Khmau High School
- Ta Khmau Primary School
- Hun Sen Sereypheap High School
- Bun Rany Hun Sen Kroa Peur Ha Primary School
- Bun Rany Hun Sen Prek Samraong Primary School
- Hun Sen Regional Pedagogy Center, Kandal Province

== Health Centers ==
- Victory Hospital (មន្ទីរពេទ្យជ័យជំនះ)

== Airport ==
- Techo International Airport (Cambodia)

== Religious Temples ==
- Wat Krabao
- Wat Krapeu Ha
- Wat Puth Yetndy
- Wat Prek Samraong
- Wat Prek Ho

== Market ==
- Market corner of the factory
- Dulux Market Takhmao
- Takhmao Market
- New Takhmao market
- Prekhor Market
