= National Road 21 (Cambodia) =

Road in Cambodia

National Highway 21

Location
- Country: Cambodia

Highway system
- Transport in Cambodia

National Road 21 is a national road of Cambodia. It connects Phnom Penh to An Phu District in Vietnam. It runs along the bank of the Bassac River.
