= Kampong Speu province =

Province of Cambodia

Kampong Speu Province ខេត្តកំពង់ស្ពឺ
- Province

Khmer transcription(s)
  - Khmer: ខេត្តកំពង់ស្ពឺ
  - UNGEGN: Khaet Kǎmpǒng Spue
  - ALA-LC: Khett Kaṃbáng Sbȳ
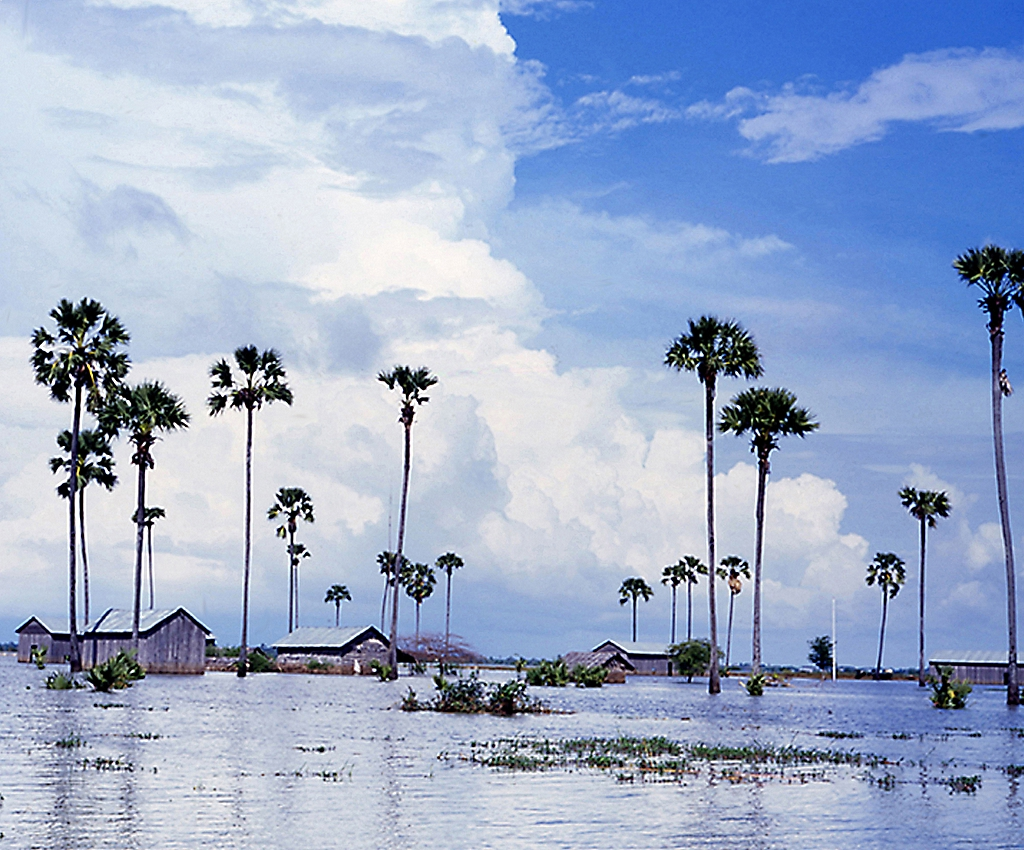
- A flooded field in Kampong Speu

- Seal

- Map of Cambodia highlighting Kampong Speu
- Coordinates: 11°30′N 104°20′E
- Country: Cambodia
- Provincial status: 1907
- Capital: Chbar Mon and Oudong Me Chey
- Subdivisions: 2 municipalities; 7 districts

Government
  - Governor: Cheam Chansophorn (CPP)
  - National Assembly: 6 / 125

Area
  - Total: 7,017 km^{2} (2,709 sq mi)
  - Rank: 11th

Population (2024)
  - Total: ▼924,175
  - Rank: 8th
  - Density: 125/km^{2} (320/sq mi)
  - Rank: 11th
- Time zone: UTC+07:00 (ICT)
- Dialing code: +855
- ISO 3166 code: KH-5

Kampong Speu Province (Khmer: ខេត្តកំពង់ស្ពឺ, Khaet Kǎmpǒng Spue, [kɑm.pɔŋ spɨː]; lit. 'carambola port') is a province of Cambodia. It borders the provinces of Pursat and Kampong Chhnang to the north, Kandal to the east, Takéo to the southeast, Kampot to the south and Koh Kong to the west. Parts of the province were designated as Central Cardamom Mountains National Park in 2016. Its capital is the town of Chbar Mon.

== Administrative divisions ==
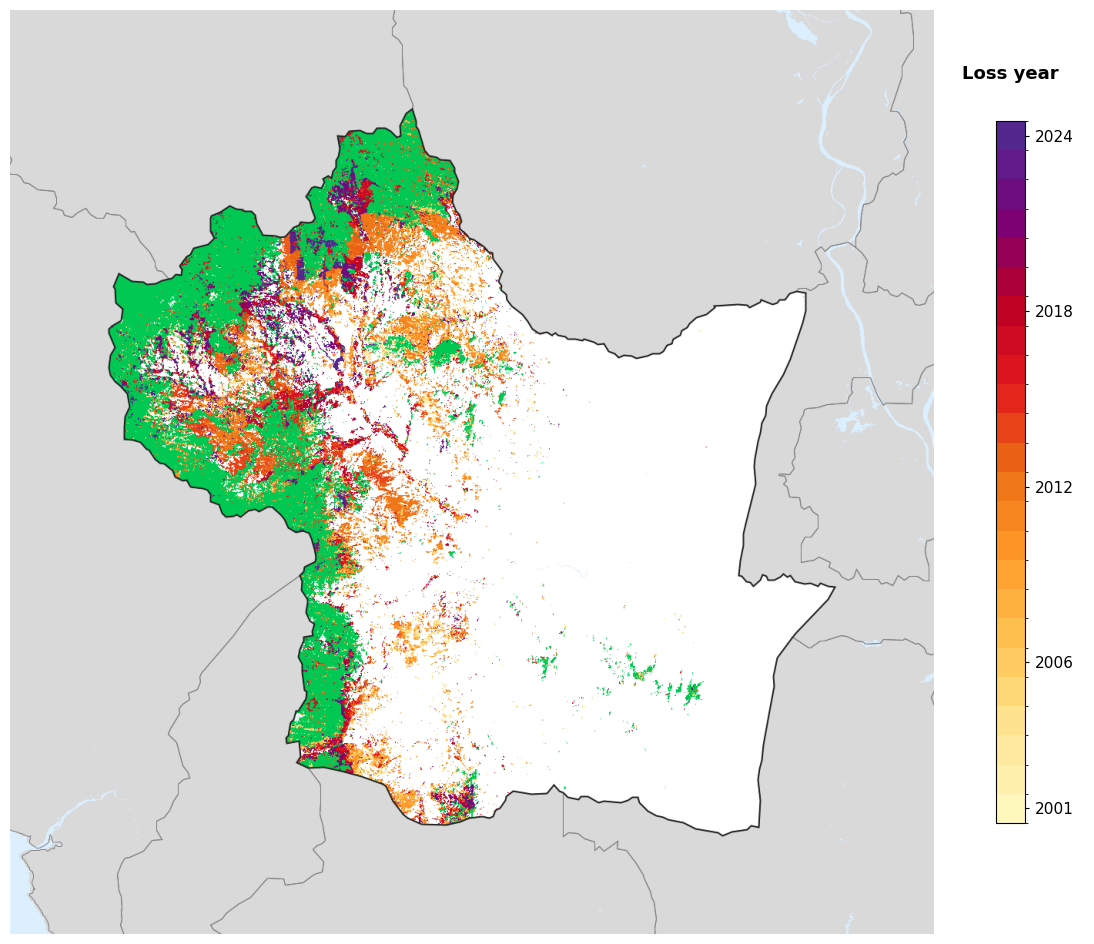
Tree-cover loss year in Kampong Speu, 2001-2024, from the Global Forest Change dataset.

The province is subdivided into 7 districts and 1 municipality, further divided into 87 communes.

ISO code	District	Khmer	Population (2019)
05-01	Basedth	ស្រុកបរសេដ្ឋ	136,971
05-02	Chbar Mon Municipality	ក្រុងច្បារមន	50,359
05-03	Kong Pisei	ស្រុកគងពិសី	145,476
05-04	Aoral	ស្រុកឱរ៉ាល់	39,544
05-05	Oudong	ស្រុកឧដុង្គ	145,311
05-06	Phnom Sruoch	ស្រុកភ្នំស្រួច	104,438
05-07	Samraong Tong	ស្រុកសំរោងទង	182,774
05-08	Thpong	ស្រុកថ្ពង	63,328
05-09	Odongk Meae Chey City	ក្រុងឧដុង្គម៉ែជ័យ	
05-10	Sameakki Muny Chey	ស្រុកសាមគ្គីមុនីជ័យ	

== Economy ==
The Wing Star Shoes factory in Kampong Speu province manufactures Asics sports shoes. It collapsed in 2013. Three people were killed. Workers struck at the Wing Star Shoes Factory in 2014, blocking National Route 3, and demanding a $5 raise in bonuses and enforcement of labor laws. In 2016 and 2018, mass faintings of workers were reported. The cause in 2016, initially attributed to a worker having been possessed by a "spirit," was later revised to "poor health and imagination." 2018, police reported that after a worker had a seizure, her "scream caused a mass panic, prompting workers to run, feel dizzy and faint."

== Attractions ==
=== Phnom Aural ===
Phnom Aural is the tallest peak in Cambodia. It is 1,813 meters tall (other sources give elevations between 1,771 and 1,667 meters). It is in the eastern part of the Cardamom Mountains. To protect the biodiversity of the mountains, Phnom Aural Wildlife Sanctuary was established. This mountain located in Aoral District, Kampong Speu province.

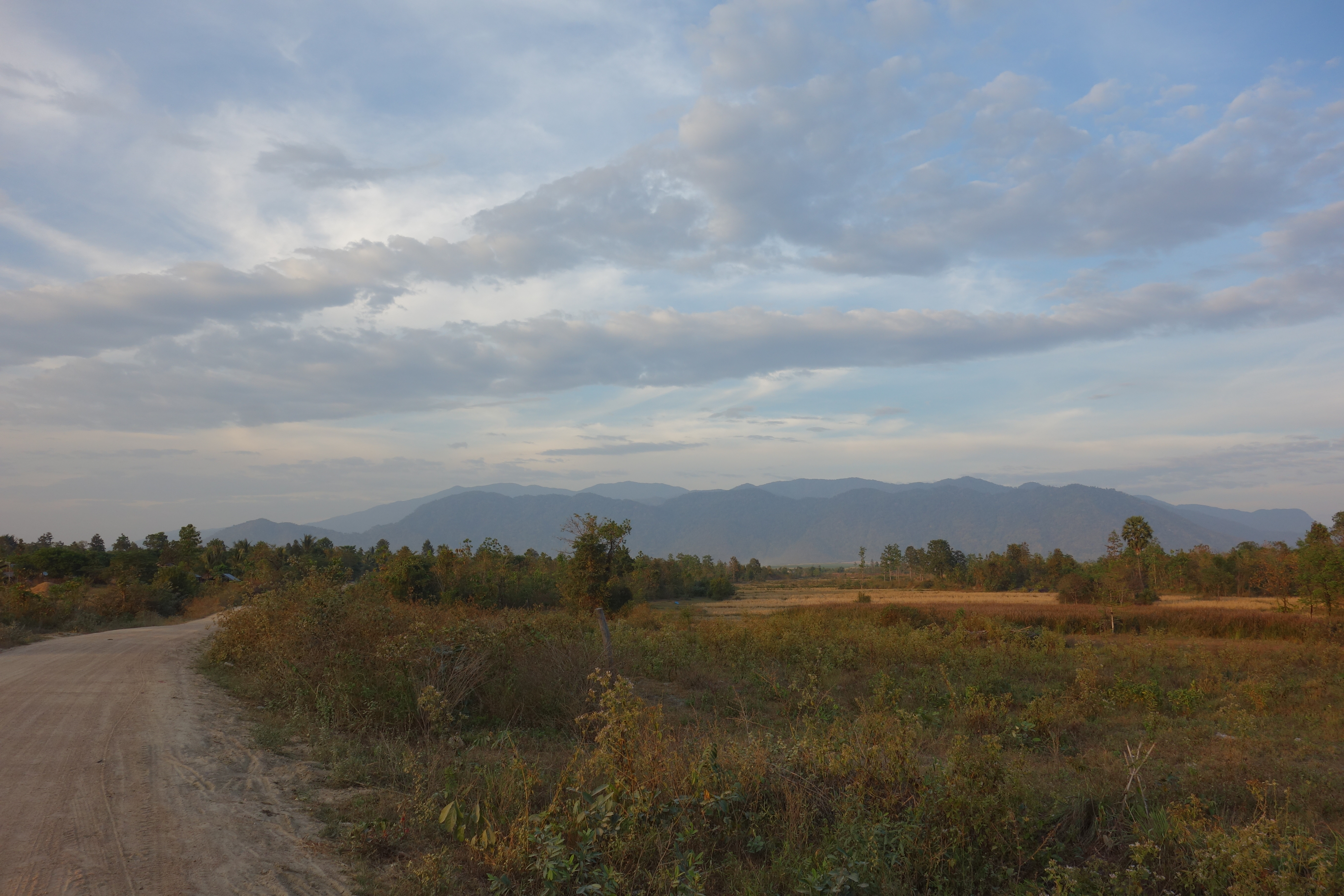
Phnom Aural Peak is the second peak from the left in the mountains behind

=== Oudong ===
Located at the foothill of the mountain Phnom Oudong, about 40 km northwest of the modern capital Phnom Penh, Oudong was royal residence and Cambodia's capital for more than 250 years until 1866. A monumental royal necropolis of sovereigns of several centuries is scattered on top the prominent bisected mountain, which runs from the southeast to the northeast.

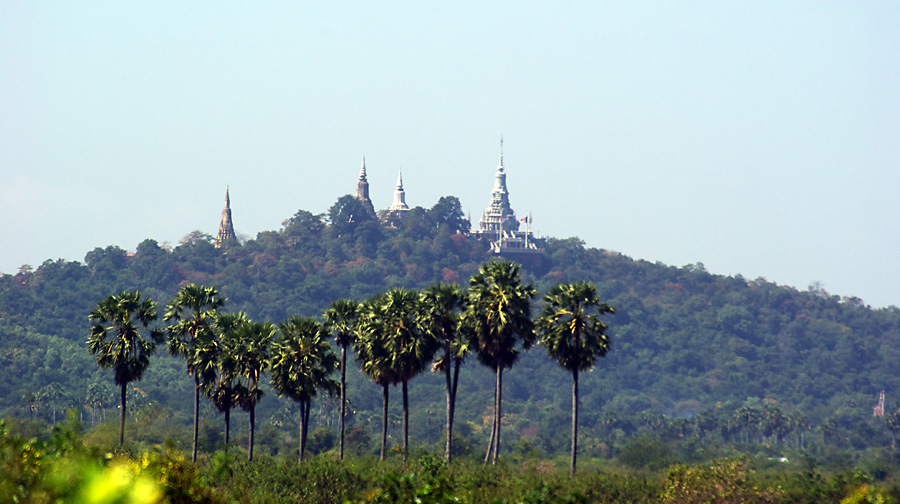
Phnom Oudong

=== Kirirom National Park ===
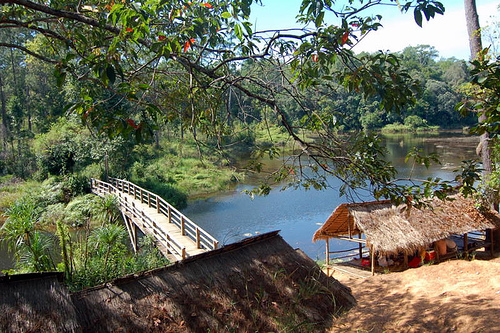
A natural lake in Kirirom

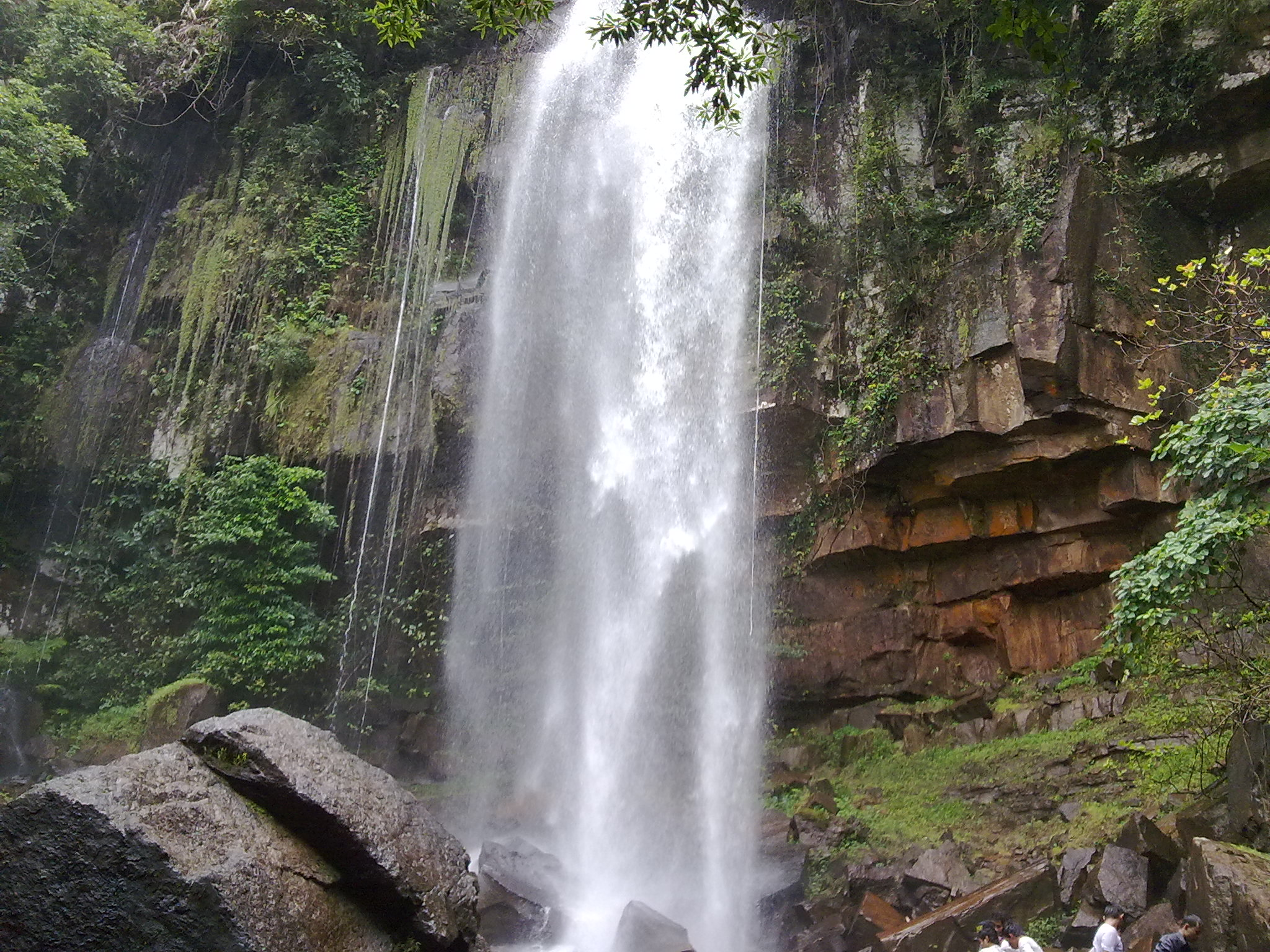
Chambok waterfall
