= Kandal province =

Province of Cambodia

Kandal Province ខេត្តកណ្ដាល
- Province

Khmer transcription(s)
  - Khmer: ខេត្តកណ្ដាល
  - UNGEGN: Khaet Kǎndal
  - ALA-LC: Khett Kanṭāl
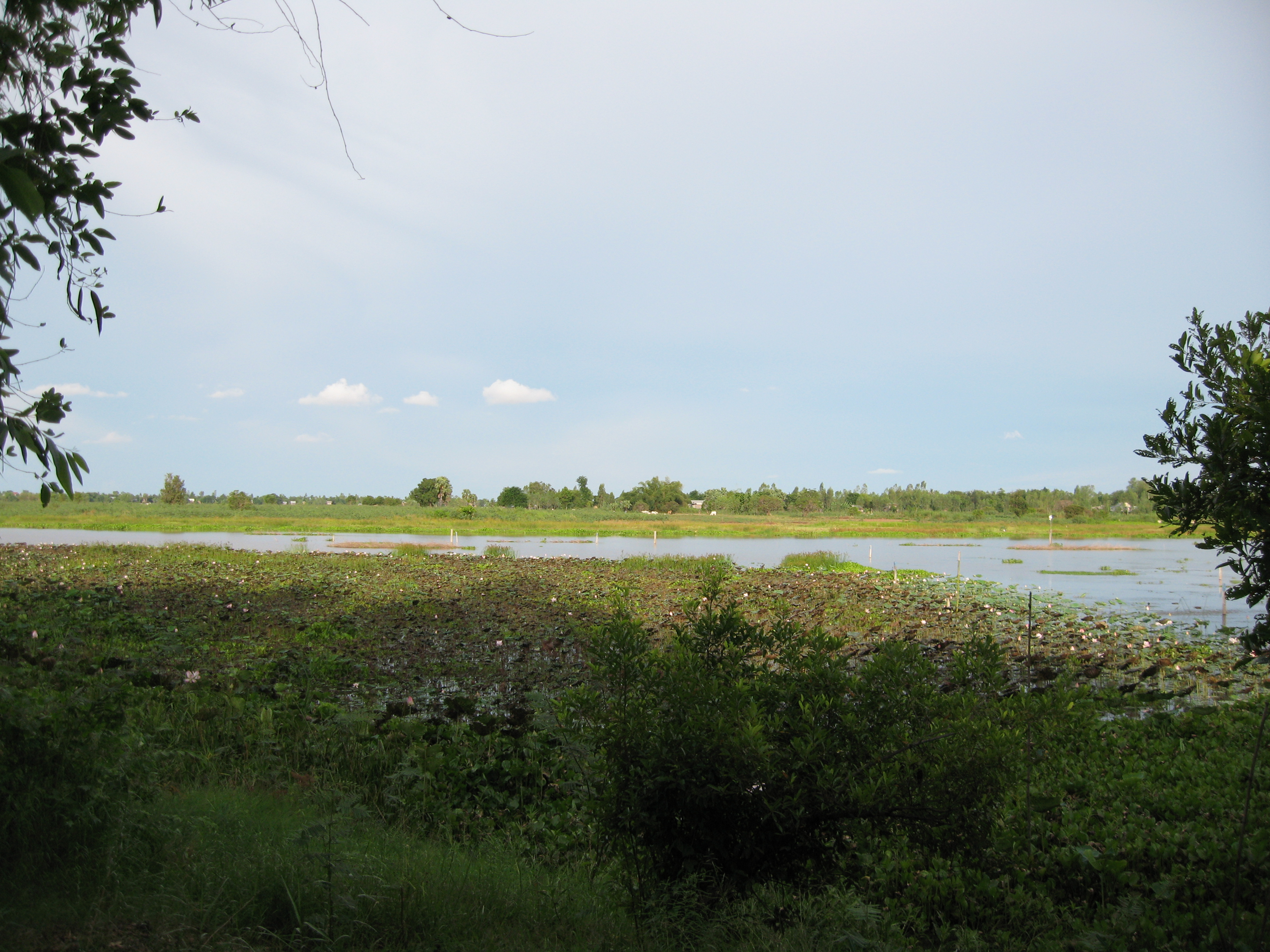
- Kien svay district

- Seal

- Map of Cambodia highlighting Kandal province
- Country: Cambodia
- Provincial status: 1907
- Capital: Ta Khmau
- Subdivisions: 10 districts; 3 municipalities

Government
  - Type: Province
  - Governor: Kuoch Chamroeun (CPP)
  - National Assembly: 11 / 125

Area
  - Total: 3,179 km^{2} (1,227 sq mi)
  - Rank: 19th
- Elevation: 10 m (33 ft)

Population (2024)
  - Total: ▲1,352,198
  - Rank: 2nd
  - Density: 378/km^{2} (980/sq mi)
  - Rank: 2nd
- Time zone: UTC+07:00 (ICT)
- ISO 3166 code: KH-8
- HDI (2017): 0.591 medium

Kandal Province (Khmer: ខេត្តកណ្ដាល, Khaet Kǎndal, [kɑn.ɗaːl]; lit. 'center') is a province of Cambodia which completely surrounds the Cambodian capital of Phnom Penh. Located in the country's southeast, it borders the provinces of Kampong Speu and Takéo to the west, Kampong Chhnang and Kampong Cham to the north, Prey Veng to the east, and shares an international border with Vietnam (An Giang and Đồng Tháp). It is the second most populous province in Cambodia after the capital Phnom Penh.

== Geography ==
The province consists of the plain wet area, covering rice fields and other agricultural plantations. The average altitude of the province is no more than 10 meters above sea level. The province features the Bassac and Mekong Rivers.

The province has a warm and humid tropical climate. The monsoon season normally begins in May and runs through October, while the rest of the year is the dry season. The warmest period of the year occurs between March and May, while the coolest period is from November through March.

== Demography ==
Along National Road #6 to the border with Kampong Cham, there is a Cham Muslims community. Before the Democratic Kampuchea period, the Cham comprised 8–12% of the population of Kandal province, and later mixed with the Khmer and embraced Theravada Buddhism. Other ethnic minorities are Vietnamese Cambodians who mostly live in Kandal, Phnom Penh, and Kampong Cham, and Chinese Cambodians who also live around Kandal and other provinces. The latter two ethnic groups make up about 2% of the population of Kandal.

== Administrative divisions ==
Map of Kandal province.

The province is subdivided into 10 districts and 3 cities. The districts are further subdivided into 146 communes (khum) and 1087 villages.

ISO code	Name	Khmer
08–01	Kandal Stueng	កណ្ដាលស្ទឹង
08–02	Kien Svay	កៀនស្វាយ
08–03	Khsach Kandal	ខ្សាច់កណ្ដាល
08–04	Kaoh Thum	កោះធំ
08–05	Leuk Daek	លើកដែក
08–06	Lvea Aem	ល្វាឯម
08–07	Mukh Kampul	មុខកំពូល
08-08	Angk Snuol	អង្គស្នួល
08–09	Ponhea Lueu	ពញាឮ
08–10	S'ang	ស្អាង
08–11	Ta Khmau	តាខ្មៅ
08-12	Sampov Poun	សំពៅពូន
08-13	Arey Ksat	អរិយក្សត្រ

== Religion ==
Religion in Kandal (2019 census)
1. Buddhism (98.3%)
2. Islam (1.20%)
3. Christianity (0.40%)
4. Animism and Other religions (0.10%)

== Landmarks ==
Oyoshi Green tea, a popular ready-to-drink Cambodian green tea brand by FN Beverages Cambodia has it's brewing, bottling and distribution done in Kandal province.
