= Administrative divisions of Cambodia =

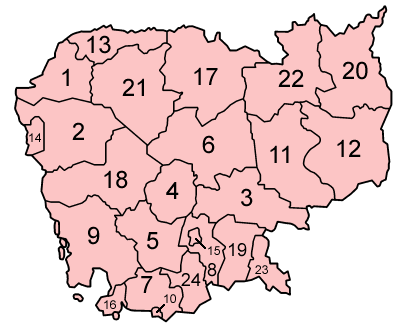
Cambodia provinces on a map

Administrative divisions of the Kingdom of Cambodia have several levels. Cambodia is divided into 24 provinces (khaet; Khmer: ខេត្ត) and the special administrative unit and capital of Phnom Penh. Though a different administrative unit, Phnom Penh is at provincial level, so de facto Cambodia has 25 provinces and municipalities.

Each province is divided into districts. As of 2023, there are 162 districts throughout the country's provinces, including Phnom Penh. Each province has one capital district (known as either a city or town, krong; ក្រុង), e.g. for Siem Reap, it is Krong Siem Reap. The exceptions are the provinces of Banteay Meanchey, Kampong Speu, Kandal, Koh Kong, Mondulkiri, Oddar Meanchey, Ratanakiri, Takéo and Tboung Khmum, where the name of the province and the capital district does not match.

A provincial district (srok, ស្រុក) is divided into communes (khum, ឃុំ). Communes are further divided into villages (phum, ភូមិ).

Phnom Penh's 14 districts are called khan (ខណ្ឌ) and their subdivisions sangkat (សង្កាត់), which are smaller in the other provinces. Sangkat are further subdivided into phum, which are usually translated as villages, though they do not necessarily cover one single settlement.

== Administrative units ==
Officially, Cambodia is divided into five administrative tiers, with different types of administrative unit on each tier:

Level	1st	2nd	3rd	4th	5th
Type	Autonomous municipality (រាជធានី reachtheani; lit. 'capital')	Section (ខណ្ឌ khan)	Quarter (សង្កាត់ sangkat)	Village (ភូមិ phum)	Block (ក្រុម krom)
Type	Province (ខេត្ត khaet)	Municipality (ក្រុង krong)	Quarter (សង្កាត់ sangkat)	Village (ភូមិ phum)	Block (ក្រុម krom)
Type	Province (ខេត្ត khaet)	District (ស្រុក srok)	Commune (ឃុំ khum)	Village (ភូមិ phum)	Block (ក្រុម krom)

== Local administration ==
In addition to these subdivisions, there are also cities and towns, which take over some of the responsibilities of the districts and communes on the area covered by the municipality. These all have an elected board and an elected mayor.

There are three different levels of municipalities (Khmer: ក្រុង):

- krong (city): More than 50,000 citizens
- krong (town): More than 10,000 citizens - or a provincial capital

In addition to the population numbers, the municipalities need to have enough tax revenues for the administration to be able to execute the offices of administrations.

Towns and cities are divided into sangkat (communes), which are equivalent to khum of rural areas.

For areas which do not reach the mandatory conditions, they exist another lower level of local administration. These usually cover a complete subdistrict (Khum), but may also cover more than one subdistrict or share a subdistrict with a municipality.

== Informal subdivisions ==
Kandal Province is informally included as part of Phnom Penh, as the urban sprawl of the capital has already spread into these areas.

There are several definitions of regions in Cambodia.

Cambodia Town, Long Beach, California, is sometimes jokingly referred to as the "25th province" of Cambodia, because of the high population of Cambodian Americans that live there.

== Changes in recent years ==
As of the end of 2013, Cambodia comprised 25 provinces and the capital Phnom Penh, divided into 185 districts, which were subdivided into 1,621 communes and 13,694 villages.

In the 2019 general population census, Cambodia had 24 provinces plus the capital district, P27 cities (krongs), 14 khans, 163 districts, 237 sangkats, 1409 communtes, and 14,545 villages.

== See also ==
- List of districts in Cambodia
- Communes of Cambodia
- Provinces of Cambodia
- List of cities in Cambodia
- ISO 3166-2:KH
