= Provinces of Cambodia =

First-level administrative division of Cambodia

Province ខេត្ត Khaet
- Category: First-level administrative subdivision of a unitary state
- Location: Cambodia
- Number: 25 (as of 2026)
- Populations: 42,665 Kep– 2,281,951 (Phnom Penh)
- Areas: 336 km^{2} (130 sq mi) (Kep) – 14,288 km^{2} (5,517 sq mi) (Mondulkiri)
- Government: Provincial government
- Subdivisions: District, municipality, section

Cambodia is divided into 25 provinces (Khmer: ខេត្ត, khaet, [kʰaet]). The capital Phnom Penh is classified as an autonomous municipality (Note: Khmer: រាជធានី, riacheăthiani; [riə.ceaʔ.tʰiə.niː], lit. 'capital city') and is governmentally and administratively at the same level as the other 24 provinces.

Phnom Penh has both the highest population and the highest population density of all provinces, but is the second smallest in land area. The largest province by area is Mondulkiri and the smallest is Kep which is also the least populated province. Mondulkiri has the lowest population density.

Each province is administered by a governor, who is nominated by the Ministry of Interior, subject to approval by the Prime Minister.

Provinces are divided into districts (ស្រុក, srŏk). The districts in Phnom Penh are called khan (ខណ្ឌ, khăn), normally written as for addresses in English followed by the districts' names (Ex: Khan Chamkar Mon; lit. 'Chamkar Mon District'). The number of districts in each province varies, from two in the smallest provinces to 14 in Battambang, Prey Veng, and Siem Reap. Provinces are subdivided into communes (ឃុំ, khŭm), which are further subdivided into villages (ភូមិ, phum). In Phnom Penh, sangkat (សង្កាត់, sǎngkăt) is used in the place of khum and, similar to khan, normally preferred for writing addresses in English (Ex: Sangkat Mittapheap; lit. 'Mittapheap Commune').

== List of provinces ==

Name	Khmer	UNGEGN	Capital (seat)	Population (2024)	Area (km^{2})	Density	ISO
Banteay Meanchey	បន្ទាយមានជ័យ	Bǎntiay Mian Chĕi	Serei Saophoan Municipality, Poipet Municipality	898,484	6,679	135	KH-1
Battambang	បាត់ដំបង	Băt Dǎmbâng	Battambang Municipality	1,132,017	11,702	97	KH-2
Kampong Cham	កំពង់ចាម	Kǎmpǒng Cham	Kampong Cham Municipality	1,062,914	4,549	234	KH-3
Kampong Chhnang	កំពង់ឆ្នាំង	Kǎmpǒng Chhnăng	Kampong Chhnang Municipality	604,895	5,521	110	KH-4
Kampong Speu	កំពង់ស្ពឺ	Kǎmpǒng Spue	Chbar Mon Municipality, Oudong Me Chey Municipality	924,175	7,017	132	KH-5
Kampong Thom	កំពង់ធំ	Kǎmpǒng Thǒm	Steung Saen Municipality	807,254	13,814	58	KH-6
Kampot	កំពត	Kǎmpôt	Kampot Municipality, Bokor Municipality	682,987	4,873	140	KH-7
Kandal	កណ្ដាល	Kǎndal	Ta Khmau Municipality, Sampov Poun Municipality, Arey Ksat Municipality	1,352,198	3,179	425	KH-8
Kep	កែប	Kaep	Kep Municipality	48,772	336	145	KH-23
Koh Kong	កោះកុង	Kǎh Kŏng	Khemarak Phoumin Municipality	140,962	10,090	14	KH-9
Kratié	ក្រចេះ	Krâcheh	Kratié Municipality	441,078	11,094	40	KH-10
Mondulkiri	មណ្ឌលគិរី	Mǒndǒl Kĭri	Senmonorom Municipality	93,657	14,288	7	KH-11
Oddar Meanchey	ឧត្តរមានជ័យ	Ŭdâ Mian Chĕi	Samraong Municipality	267,703	6,158	43	KH-22
Pailin	ប៉ៃលិន	Pailĭn	Pailin Municipality	79,445	803	99	KH-24
Phnom Penh	ភ្នំពេញ	Phnǒm Penh	Khan Doun Penh	2,352,851	679	3,465	KH-12
Preah Sihanouk	ព្រះសីហនុ	Preăh Seihănŭ	Sihanoukville Municipality, Kampong Soam Municipality, Koh Rong Municipality	234,702	1,938	121	KH-18
Preah Vihear	ព្រះវិហារ	Preăh Vihia	Preah Vihear Municipality	249,973	13,788	18	KH-13
Prey Veng	ព្រៃវែង	Prĕi Vêng	Prey Veng Municipality	1,277,867	4,883	273	KH-14
Pursat	ពោធិ៍សាត់	Po Săt	Pursat Municipality	516,072	12,692	41	KH-15
Ratanakiri	រតនគិរី	Roătănă Kĭri	Banlung Municipality	235,852	10,782	22	KH-16
Siem Reap	សៀមរាប	Siam Riap	Siem Reap Municipality, Run Ta Aek Municipality	1,099,825	10,299	107	KH-17
Stung Treng	ស្ទឹងត្រែង	Stuĕng Traeng	Stung Treng Municipality	176,488	11,092	16	KH-19
Svay Rieng	ស្វាយរៀង	Svay Riang	Svay Rieng Municipality, Bavet Municipality	613,159	2,966	207	KH-20
Takéo	តាកែវ	Ta Kaew	Doun Kaev Municipality	1,097,243	3,563	308	KH-21
Tboung Khmum	ត្បូងឃ្មុំ	Tbong Khmŭm	Suong Municipality	889,970	5,250	170	KH-25

== History ==
- 1974: The Khmer Rouge government did away with the former Cambodian traditional administrative divisions. Instead of provinces, Democratic Kampuchea was divided into seven geographic zones (Khmer: តំបន់, tǎmbǎn): the Northwest, the North, the Northeast, the East, the Southwest, the West, and the Centre. These zones were derived from divisions established by the Khmer Rouge when they fought against the Khmer Republic during the Cambodian Civil War.
- 2008: On 22 December 2008, King Norodom Sihamoni signed a decree that changed the municipalities of Kep, Pailin and Sihanoukville into provincial municipalities, as well as adjusting several provincial borders.
- 2013: On 31 December 2013, King Norodom Sihamoni signed a decree that split Kampong Cham into two provinces: Kampong Cham (west of the Mekong River) and Tboung Khmum (east of the Mekong River).
- 2018: In September 2018, Interior Minister Sar Kheng proposed establishing two more provinces, with areas taken from Kandal, Mondulkiri, and Ratanakiri. Prime Minister Hun Sen rejected the plan.

== See also ==
- List of Cambodian provinces by Human Development Index
- Administrative divisions of Cambodia
- List of districts, municipalities and sections in Cambodia
- List of communes in Cambodia
- ISO 3166-2:KH
