= Malai district =

Malai ម៉ាឡៃ
- District
- Malai District ស្រុកម៉ាឡៃ
- Map showing the location of the district within Banteay Meanchey Province.

- Location in Cambodia
- Coordinates: 13°25′N 102°36′E
- Country: Cambodia
- Province: Banteay Meanchey
- Communes: 6
- Villages: 37

Government
  - Governor: Tep Khunnal

Population (2008)
  - Total: 42,284
- Time zone: UTC+07:00 (ICT)
- Geocode: 0109

Malai (Khmer: ម៉ាឡៃ [maːlaj], lit. 'The Garland of Flower') is a district (srok) in the southwest of Banteay Meanchey Province, in north-western Cambodia. The district capital is the town of Malai located around 75 kilometres west of the provincial capital of Serei Saophoan by road.

The long narrow district shares a border with Thailand to the north and west and with Battambang province to the south. No national highway or national roads run through the district and road access from within Cambodia is difficult. The district was a Khmer Rouge stronghold and battleground through the 1980s and 1990s. Today it is a remote and sparsely populated border area with scattered settlements mostly made up of former rebels.

Only one sizeable road in poor condition enters the district from nearby Ou Chrov district. It is 35 kilometres on this road from Malai town to the National Highway 5 near Poipet. From here, it is a further 40 kilometres to Sisophon. Malai district is one of the smallest districts in Banteay Meanchey province by land area and also has the smallest population.

Like many former Khmer Rouge held areas of the country of Democratic Kampuchea (1975-1979), infrastructure is in poor condition or is non-existent. Most of the interior of the district is uninhabited and nearly all the 37 villages in the district are located close to the border. One provincial road begins at the border and runs east through the district to an intersection near Souriya in Ou Chrov district. Numerous smaller roads also run to the Thai border along the length of the district.

== Location ==
Malai District lies in the far west of the province and shares a border with Sa Kaeo province of Thailand. Reading from the north clockwise, Malai borders with Amphoe Aranyaprathet of Thailand to the north west and Ou Chrov district to the north east. The eastern border of the district is shared with Ou Chrov and Mongkol Borei districts. To the south, the district shares a border with Bavel and Sampov Lun districts of Battambang province. The western border of the district also joins with Aranyaprathet district of Sa Kaeo province in Thailand.

== Administration ==
The Malai district governor is Mr. Tep Khunnal. He was promoted to the position in May, 2005, previously he served as deputy district Governor. Khunnal is a former Khmer Rouge diplomat and was part of the rebel group's delegation to the United Nations during the 1980s. He was a close associate of Pol Pot and on one occasion translated for the KR leader during a rare interview with a western journalist in 1997.

After Pot's death in 1998, Khunnal married the deceased leader's wife and moved to Malai district in Banteay Meanchey. He reports to Oung Ouen, the Governor of Banteay Meanchey. The following table shows the villages (phums) of Malai district by communes.

Name	Khmer	Subdivisions
Boeng Beng	បឹងបេង	5 phums: Chambak, Chrey, Lvea, Phnum Rung, Sangkae
Malai	ម៉ាឡៃ	8 phums: Dom Bouk Vil, Doung, Kandal, Kbal Spean, Thmey, Trasek Chrum, Veal Hat, Wat Chas
Ou Sampoar	អូរសំព័រ	4 phums: Banteay Tipi, Kbal Tomnob, Ou Sampoar I, Ou Sampoar II
Ou Sralau	អូរស្រឡៅ	8 phums: Boeng Reang, Chankiri, Chheuteal, Kandaol, Ou Sralau, Phnum Kaubei, Svay Prey, Thmei
Ta Kong	តាគង់	6 phums: Ballang, Chaeng Maeng, Kcheay, Paoy Angkor, Srah Phluoh, Ta Kong
Tuol Pongro	ទួលពង្រ	12 phums: Aphivoat, Banteay Timuoy, Boeng Chhuk, Khla Ngeab, Koh Snuol, Ou Ampil, Ou Kes, Reaksmey Meanchey, Santepheap, Sralau Chrum, Tuol Pongro, Tuol Prasat

== Demographics ==
The district is subdivided into 6 communes (khum) and 37 villages (phum). According to the 1998 Census, the population of the district was 22,724 persons in 4,383 households in 1998. This population consisted of 11,697 males (51.5%) and 11,027 females (48.5%). With a population of around 20,000 people, Malai has the smallest district population in Banteay Meanchey province. The average household size in Malai is 5.2 persons per household, which is exactly the same as the rural average for Cambodia. The sex ratio in the district is 106.1%, with significantly more males than females.
