= Lao Nyo language =

Southwestern Tai language

Lao Nyo
- ឡាវញ៉ ลาวญ้อ
- Native to: Cambodia, Thailand
- Native speakers: 15,000 (2014)
- Language family: Kra–Dai: Tai; Southwestern (Thai); Lao–Phutai; Lao Nyo

Language codes
- ISO 639-3: None (mis)
- Glottolog: None
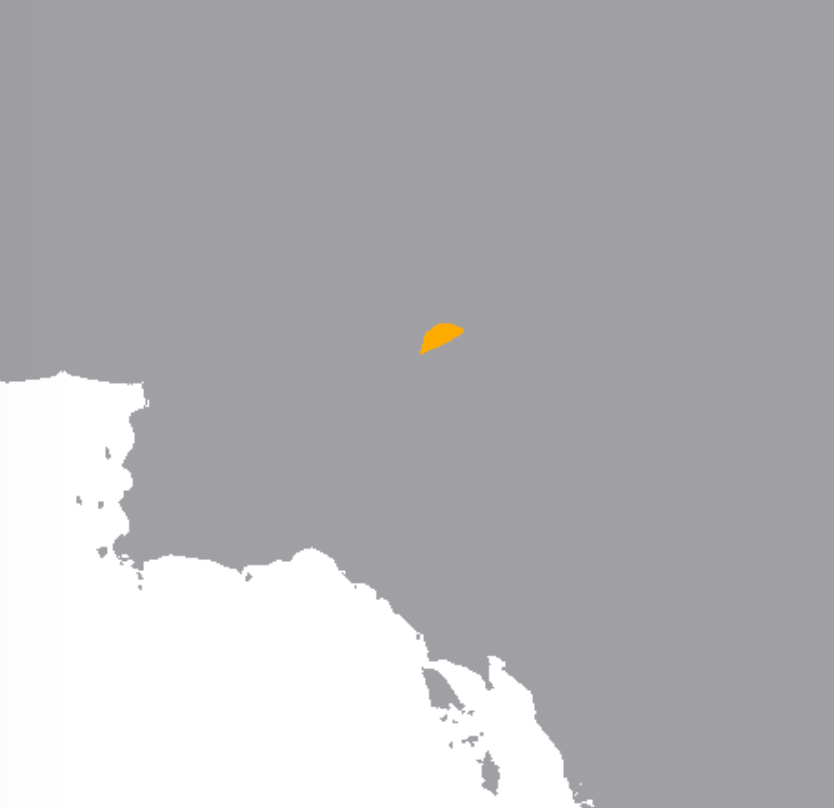

Lao Nyo or Nyo (autonym: laːw˧ɲɔːʔ˦) is a Southwestern Tai language spoken mostly in Banteay Meanchey Province, Cambodia, as well as in Aranyaprathet District, Sa Kaew Province, Thailand. There are between 10,000 and 15,000 speakers of Lao Nyo in Cambodia. Lao Nyo is classified as a dialect of Lao rather than Nyo (Nyaw), based on linguistic data from Aun Loung Svay Chas village in Cambodia.

== Name ==
The name Nyo likely came about as an exonym that was later adopted as an endonym; the Lao Nyo did not actually originate from the ethnic Nyo of Isan and Laos. This exonym may have been used due to the Lao Nyo's geographical origins or their language.

== Classification ==
Nyo is a Southwestern Tai language spoken in Tha Uthen District, Nakhon Phanom Province and Kantharawichai District, Maha Sarakham Province of Thailand, as well as Khamkeut District, Bolikhamxay Province of Laos. However, Trongdee (2014) shows that Lao Nyo of Banteay Meanchey is not Nyo or Yo, although some Lao Nyo tones are more similar to Nyo tones than to Lao tones.

== Locations ==
The following Lao Nyo villages have been documented in Cambodia.

- Ou Chrov District, Banteay Meanchey Province
  - Koub Thom (កូបធំ)
  - Dong Aranh (ដុងអារញ្ញ)
  - Aunloung Svay Chas (អន្លង់ស្វាយចាស់)
  - Aun Loung Svay Thmey (អន្លង់ស្វាយថ្មី)
  - Kou Touch (កូបតូច)
  - Koub Cherng (កូបជេីង)
  - Koub Thboung (កូបត្បូង)
  - Khai Dorn (ខៃដន)
  - Sery Pheap (សេរីភាព)
- Srei Sophone District, Banteay Meanchey Province
  - Phnum Bak village, Tuek Thla commune (ភ្នំបាក់)
  - Ou Ambel village, Ou Ambel commune (អូរអំបិល)
- Bor Vil District, Battambang Province (5 villages)
  - Makreu (មក្លឿ)
  - Salor Klaen (ស្លខ្លាញ់)
  - Phum Leau (ភូមិលេី)
  - Prey Kapos (ព្រៃខ្ពស់)
  - Phum Koub (ភូមិកូប)

In Sa Kaew Province, Thailand, the Lao Nyo are found in the following subdistricts (tambon) of Aranyaprathet District.

- Klong Nam Sai (คลองน้ำใส)
- Mueang Phai (เมืองไผ่)
- Phan Suek (ผ่านศึก)
- Tha Kham (ท่าข้าม)
- Aranyaprathet (อรัญประเทศ)
