= Srah Reang =

Srah Reang ឃុំស្រះរាំង
- Commune
- Location within Cambodia
- Coordinates: 13°30′N 103°4′E
- Country: Cambodia
- Province: Banteay Meanchey
- District: Mongkol Borei District
- Villages: 9
- Time zone: UTC+7 (ICT)
- Geocode: 010212

Srah Reang (Khmer: ឃុំស្រះរាំង) is a khum (commune) of Mongkol Borei District in Banteay Meanchey Province in western Cambodia.

== History ==
Nine houses in three villages in the commune were damaged by Typhoon Fate on the night of July 29, 2012, though the district police chief confirmed that the typhoon caused no loss of life. In 2016, an 11-kilometer road spanning the communes of Srah Reang and Banteay Neang was damaged by heavy rain. The road was reopened in September 2016.

== Geography ==
Srah Reang lies approximately 16 kilometres (9.9 mi) by road southeast of Sisophon, to the east of Banteay Neang.

== Villages ==
- Ta In Muoy
- Ta In Pir
- Krouch
- Chamkar Chek
- Srah Reang
- Ta Chan
- Kouk Srok
- Kouk Chrab
- Kouk Krasang

== Landmarks ==
The commune contains a small health centre, the Wat Sal Rangsiyaram monastery (វត្តសាលរង្សិយារាម), and the Dongroun Pagoda.
