= Mongkol Borei =

Mongkol Borei can refer to:

- Mongkol Borei District, a district of Banteay Meanchey Province in north eastern Cambodia
- Mongkol Borei River, a river that flows through the district to the Tonle Sap
- Mongkol Borei (town), the capital of Mongkol Borei District
