= Sambuor =

Sambuor ឃុំសំបួរ (ស្រុកមង្គលបុរី)
- Commune
- Location within Cambodia
- Coordinates: 13°26′05″N 103°12′37″E
- Country: Cambodia
- Province: Banteay Meanchey
- District: Mongkol Borey district
- Villages: 11

Population (2019)
  - Total: 5,954
- Time zone: UTC+7 (ICT)
- Geocode: 010210

Sambuor is a commune (khum) of teh Mongkol Borey district, in the Banteay Meanchey province located in western Cambodia. Spanning 18.99 square kilometres across 11 villages (phum), it is located about 365 km northwest of Phnom Penh, near the edge of Tonle Sap Lake, and is prone to annual flooding up to two metres deep.

== Geography and location ==
Sambuor is a commune (khum) of the Mongkol Borey district, located in the Banteay Meanchey province in western Cambodia. It is about 365 km north west of the capital Phnom Penh. The commune is found near the edge of Tonle Sap Lake, about 32 kilometres from Mongkol Borey, the centre of Mongkol Borey district. Sambuor is subject to annual flooding, and floodwaters can reach depths of up to two metres in some villages.

== Infrastructure ==
Sambuor was included in Cambodia's Third Rural Water Supply and Sanitation Services Sector Development Program in 2019, supported by the Asian Development Bank. The proposed programme included rehabilitation of five community ponds, construction of eleven drilled wells, distribution of 528 rainwater jars, and subsidised latrine installations for 243 households and nine schools and health centres.

== Demographics ==
Sambuor contains 11 villages (phum): Chhnaeum Meas, Sranal, La, Ta Meaeng Pok, Sambuor, Doun Loek, Kbal Krabei, Srah Chhuk, Srae Prey, Chaek Angkar, and Thma Dab.

According to the 2019 Cambodian census, published by the National Institute of Statistics of Cambodia, the population of Sambuor was 5,954 inhabitants, divided into 3,166 (53.2%) females and 2,788 (46.8%) males. In an area of 18.99 square kilometres, the population density is 313.5 inhabitants per square kilometre. The commune had an annual growth rate of 0.87%, compared to the 2008 Cambodian census figure of 5,414. However, the population has not recovered to the figure of 6,157, as recorded in the 1998 Cambodian census.
