= Serei Saophoan Municipality =

Serei Saophoan សិរីសោភ័ណ Sisophon
- Municipality
- Serei Saophoan Municipality ក្រុងសិរីសោភ័ណ
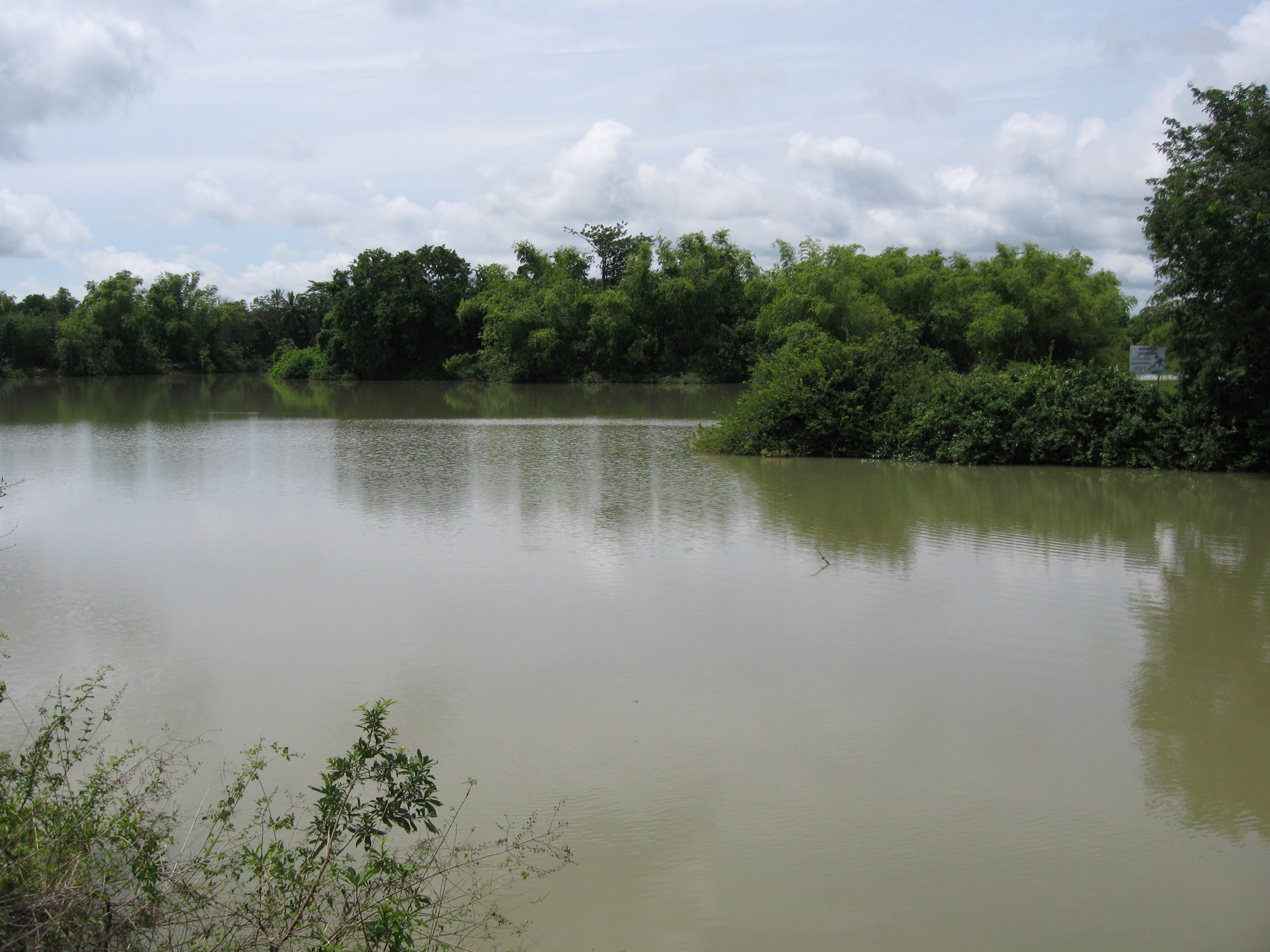
- Small lake in Serei Saophoan Municipality

- Map showing the location of the district within Banteay Meanchey Province.

- Location in Cambodia
- Coordinates: 13°35′N 102°59′E
- Country: Cambodia
- Province: Banteay Meanchey
- Communes: 7
- Villages: 42

Population (2008)
  - Total: 90,279
- Time zone: UTC+07:00 (ICT)
- Geocode: 0106

Serei Saophoan (Khmer: សិរីសោភ័ណ [serəj saopʰɔən]; lit. 'The Glorious and Auspicious') is a municipality (krong) in the centre of Banteay Meanchey province, in north-western Cambodia. Serei Saophoan is the urban district of Banteay Meanchey province and the district capital is also the provincial capital Sisophon town. The town is located 359 kilometres north of Phnom Penh and 48 kilometres from the border with Thailand at Poipet. Serei Saophoan municipality is the central municipality of Banteay Meanchey and is surrounded by other Banteay Meanchey districts. Cambodia's main railway line from Phnom Penh to Poipet enters the municipality from the south and exits to the west.

The municipality is easily accessed by road from Phnom Penh (359 km) Battambang (68 km) and Siem Reap (city) (102 km). Serei Saophoan municipality is the smallest municipality in Banteay Meanchey province by land area. However, it has one of the largest municipality populations in the province due to its central location and access to transport infrastructure. National Highway 5 which begins in Phnom Penh and ends at Poipet and the National railway both bisect the municipality in parallel. National Highway 6 which begins in Phnom Penh also has its terminus at Sisophon town in Serei Saophoan. National road 56 begins at Sisophon town in the centre of the municipality and runs north east to Samraong in Oddar Meanchey province.

== Etymology ==
Serei Saophoan means "glorious and auspicious" in Khmer. Serei (Khmer: សិរិ) is derived from the Sanskrit word śrī (श्री) meaning "glorious", and Saophoan (Khmer: សោភ័ណ) is derived from the Sanskrit word śubhana meaning "auspicious".

== Rehabilitation centre ==
A boot camp-style rehabilitation centre, chiefly for those addicted to drugs, is located within Serei Saophoan district, in Sisophon town. The camp is run by the military police, a division of the Royal Cambodian Armed Forces. Young men are sent to the centre by their parents because they take drugs, drink too much or are out of control. At the centre residents receive compulsory military training, massive amounts of exercise and self-criticism sessions 7 days per week for a minimum of five months.

The centre submits its young inmates to a gruelling regime of military-style physical training. Residents are signed into the centre by their parents, regardless of their age, and attendance is voluntary. However, if the young men try to escape, the staff chase them, catch them and bring them back to the camp. There the other residents administer a beating.

== Location ==
Serei Saophoan district lies in the centre of the province. Reading from the north clockwise, Serei Saophoan borders with Svay Chek district to the north. The eastern border of the district is shared with Preah Netr Preah district. The Sisophon River runs through the district flowing from west to east. To the south the district shares a border with Mongkol Borei district. The western border of the district joins with Ou Chrov district of Banteay Meanchey.

== Administration ==
The Serei Saophoan district governor reports to Oung Ouen, the Governor of Banteay Meanchey. The following table shows the villages of Serei Saophoan district by commune.

Khum (Commune)	Phum (Villages)
Kampong Svay	Kampong Svay, Kang Va, Phum Pir, Pongro, Souphi
Koh Pongsat	Koh Pongsat, Ta Sokh, Preah Ang, Snay Dangkot, Angkea Bos
Mkak	Mkak, Kbal Spean, Ta Ma, Kon Leab, Chhouk, Doun Lei, Baek Chan
Ou Ambel	Saesen, Kourothan, Roung Masin, Prohut, Ou Ambel
Phniet	Kantuot, Kampring, Phniet, Neak Ta, Thmei, Bangruh, Sala Krav
Preah Ponlea	Chak, Phum Muoy, Phum Bei, Phum Buon, Prey Ruessei, Preah Ponlea, Kbal Spean
Tuek Thla	Keab, Tomnob Chrey, Tuek Thla, Banay, Phnom Bak, Dei Lo

== Demographics ==
The district is subdivided into 7 communes (khum) and 42 villages (phum). According to the 1998 Census, the population of the district was 98,848 persons in 18,374 households in 1998. This population consisted of 48,056 males (48.6%) and 50,792 females (51.4%). With a population of almost 100,000 people, Serei Saophoan has one of the largest district populations in Banteay Meanchey province. The average household size in Serei Saophoan is 5.4 persons per household, which is slightly larger than the rural average for Cambodia (5.2 persons). The sex ratio in the district is 94.6%, with more females than males.
