= Malai (commune) =

Commune in Malai District, Banteay Meanchey, Cambodia

Coordinates: 13°34′N 102°22′E

Malai ម៉ាឡៃ
- Commune
- Malai Commune ឃុំម៉ាឡៃ
- Interactive map of Malai
- Country: Cambodia
- Province: Banteay Meanchey
- District: Malai
- Subdivision: 8 villages
- Time zone: UTC+07:00 (ICT)

Malai (Khmer: ម៉ាឡៃ [maːlaj]) is a commune (khum) of Malai District in Banteay Meanchey Province in north-western Cambodia.

== Villages ==
| Name | Khmer | IPA |
|---|---|---|
| Dambouk Vil | ដំបូកវិល | [ɗɑmɓoːk ʋɨl] |
| Duong | ដួង | [ɗuəŋ] |
| Kandal | កណ្ដាល | [kɑnɗaːl] |
| Kbal Spean | ក្បាលស្ពាន | [kɓaːl spiən] |
| Trasek Chrum | ត្រសេកជ្រំ | [trɑseːk crum] |
| Thmey | ថ្មី | [tʰməj] |
| Veal Hat | វាលហាត់ | [ʋiəl hat] |
| Wat Chas | វត្តចាស់ | [ʋoət cah] |
