= Kôy Mêng =

Commune in Mongkol Borei District, Banteay Meanchey Province, Cambodia

Koy Maeng គយម៉ែង
- Commune
- Koy Maeng Commune ឃុំគយម៉ែង
- Location within Cambodia
- Coordinates: 13°33′01″N 103°06′10″E
- Country: Cambodia
- Province: Banteay Meanchey
- District: Mongkol Borei
- Time zone: UTC+07:00 (ICT)
- Geocode: 010205

Koy Maeng (Khmer: គយម៉ែង [kɔːj maeŋ]) is a commune (khum) of Mongkol Borei District in Banteay Meanchey Province in northwestern Cambodia.

== Villages ==
- Koy Maeng
- Sdei Leu
- Phlov Siem
- Ta Nong
- Angkar Khmau
- Kasang Thmei
- Stueng Chas
- Sdei Kraom
