= Bos Sbov =

Commune in Preah Netr Preah District, Banteay Meanchey, Cambodia

Bos Sbov ឃុំបុស្បូវ
- Commune
- Location within Cambodia
- Coordinates: 13°41′43″N 103°04′42″E
- Country: Cambodia
- Province: Banteay Meanchey
- District: Preah Netr Preah
- Villages: 17
- Time zone: UTC+7 (ICT)
- Geocode: 010409

Bos Sbov (Khmer: ឃុំបុស្បូវ) is a khum (commune) of Preah Netr Preah District in Banteay Meanchey Province in north-western Cambodia. Prior to 2008–2009 it belonged to the Serei Saophoan District.

== Villages ==
- Trabaek
- Kandal
- Kouk Thum
- Bos Sbov
- Soutr Mont
- Srah Khtum
- Kabau
- Kbal Khting
- Smach
- Boeng Veaeng
- Bantoat Baoh
- Pring Kaong
- Khchas
- Khnhaer
- Khu Svay
- Khvav
- Tbaeng
