= Boeng Beng =

Commune in Malai District, Banteay Meanchey Province, Cambodia

Boeng Beng បឹងបេង
- Commune
- Boeng Beng Commune ឃុំបឹងបេង
- Location within Cambodia
- Coordinates: 13°31′21″N 102°21′59″E
- Country: Cambodia
- Province: Banteay Meanchey
- District: Malai
- Subdivisions: 5 villages
- Time zone: UTC+07:00 (ICT)
- Geocode: 010901

Boeng Beng (Khmer: បឹងបេង [ɓəŋ ɓeːŋ]) is a commune (khum) of Malai District in Banteay Meanchey Province in north-western Cambodia.

== Villages ==
Name	Khmer	IPA
Chambak	ចំបក់	[cɑmɓɑk]
Chrey	ជ្រៃ	[crəj]
Lvea	ល្វា	[lʋiə]
Phnom Rung	ភ្នំរូង	[pʰnom ruːŋ]
Sangkae	សង្កែ	[sɑŋkae]
