= Ruessei Kraok =

Coordinates: 13°33′N 103°02′E

Ruessei Kraok ឃុំប្ញស្សីក្រោក
- Commune
- Interactive map of Ruessei Kraok
- Country: Cambodia
- Province: Banteay Meanchey
- District: Mongkol Borei District
- Villages: 16
- Time zone: UTC+7 (ICT)
- Geocode: 010209

Ruessei Kraok is a khum (commune) of Mongkol Borei District in Banteay Meanchey Province in western Cambodia.

== Villages ==
- Anhchanh
- Neang Ket
- Praek Ropou
- Sala Daeng
- Samraong
- Anlong Mean Trop
- Chamkar Ta Daok
- Pralay Luong Kraom
- Luong
- Ou Ta Kol
- Pralay Luong Leu
- Kouk Svay
- Ou Ta Ma
- Kaoh Kaev
- Phasi Sra
- Ruessei Kraom
- Chumteav
