= Châmnaôm =

Commune Mongkol Borei District, Banteay Meanchey Province, Cambodia

Chamnaom ចំណោម
- Commune
- Chamnaom Commune ឃុំចំណោម
- Location within Cambodia
- Coordinates: 13°27′N 102°56′E
- Country: Cambodia
- Province: Banteay Meanchey
- District: Mongkol Borei
- Time zone: UTC+07:00 (ICT)
- Geocode: 010203

Chamnaom (Khmer: ចំណោម, romanized: Châmnaôm [cɑmnaom]) is a commune (khum) of Mongkol Borei District in Banteay Meanchey Province in northwestern Cambodia.

== Villages ==
- Pralay Char
- Rongvean Lech
- Rongvean Kaeut
- Chamnaom Lech
- Chamnaom Kaeut
- Roung Kou Daeum
- Roung Kou Kandal
- Roung Kou Chong
- Peam Roung kou
- Ta Sal
- Chuor Khchas
- Boeng Tras
- Dang Trang
- Srae Prey
- Bos Tonloab
- Ta Bun
- Kouk Ponley
- Say Samon
- Damnak Preas Ang
