= Phnum Toch =

Phnum Toch ភ្នំតូច
- Commune
- Phnum Toch Commune ឃុំភ្នំតូច
- Location within Cambodia
- Coordinates: 13°24′N 103°1′E
- Country: Cambodia
- Province: Banteay Meanchey
- District: Mongkol Borei
- Time zone: UTC+07:00 (ICT)
- Geocode: 010207

Phnum Toch (Khmer: ភ្នំតូច [pʰnum toːc]; lit. 'Small Mountain') is a commune (khum) of Mongkol Borei District in Banteay Meanchey Province in western Cambodia.

== Villages ==
- Phnum Touch Tboung
- Phnum Touch Cheung
- Thnal Bat
- Ou Nhor
- Boeng Tras
- Monourom
- Paoy Ta Sek
- Prey Totueng
- Boeng Reang
- Voat Thmei
