= Nimit =

Commune in Poipet Municipality, Banteay Meanchey, Cambodia

Nimit សង្កាត់និមិត្ត
- Commune
- Location within Cambodia
- Coordinates: 13°37′47″N 102°41′24″E
- Country: Cambodia
- Province: Banteay Meanchey
- Municipality: Poipet
- Villages: 15

Population (2008)
  - Total: 18,440
- Time zone: UTC+7 (ICT)
- Geocode: 011001

Nimit (Khmer: និមិត្ត) is a sangkat of Poipet Municipality in Banteay Meanchey Province in north-western Cambodia. Before the establishment of Poipet Municipality, it was a khum of Ou Chrov District.

== Villages ==
Nimit contains 15 villages.

- Nimit I
- Nimit II
- Nimit III
- Nimit IV
- Ou Chrov
- Dong Aranh
- Soriya
- Nimit Thmei
- Thma Sen
- Anlong Svay
- Kon Damrei
- Kap Thom
- Raksmei Samaki
- Raksmei Serey Pheap
- Sok San
