= Preah Netr Preah district =

Preah Netr Preah ស្រុកព្រះនេត្រព្រះ
- District (srok)
- Map showing the location of the district within Banteay Meanchey Province.

- Location in Cambodia
- Coordinates: 13°37′N 103°15′E
- Country: Cambodia
- Province: Banteay Meanchey
- Communes: 8
- Villages: 102

Population (2008)
  - Total: 87,089
- Time zone: +7
- Geocode: 0104

Preah Netr Preah (Khmer: ស្រុកព្រះនេត្រព្រះ, lit. 'The Eyes of God') is a district (srok) in the east of Banteay Meanchey province, in north-western Cambodia. The district capital is Preah Netr Preah town located around 24 kilometres (15 mi) due east of the provincial capital of Sisophon by road. Preah Netr Preah district is one of the easternmost districts of Banteay Meanchey. The district shares a border with both Siem Reap province and Battambang province to the east and the south respectively. Two major watercourses, the Sangke River and the Mongkol Borei River run through the district.

The district is easily accessed by road from Sisophon (24 km [15 mi]) and Siem Reap (78 km [48 mi]). Preah Netr Preah is one of the largest districts in Banteay Meanchey province by land area and only Thma Puok district is larger. National Highway 6 which begins in Skun town Kampong Cham province and ends at Sisophon bisects the district running from east to west. Various smaller roads connect the district with Phnom Srok district and Mongkol Borei district.

== The Dam of Widows ==
A 10 km (6.2 mi)-long, incomplete Khmer Rouge dam in Preah Netr Preah district is known as the "Dam of Widows". The dam gained wider attention as the title of a book La Digue Des Veuves or, in English, The Dam of Widows: Survivors of the Khmer Rouge Hell by the Frenchwoman Denise Affonço.

== Location ==
Preah Netr Preah district lies in the east of the province and borders on Siem Reap and Battambang provinces. Reading from the north clockwise, Preah Netr Preah borders with Phnom Srok district to the north. The eastern border of the district is shared with Kralanh district of Siem Reap. To the south the district shares a border with Aek Phnum District of Battambang Province and Mongkol Borei district of Banteay Meanchey. The western border of the district is shared with Serei Saophoan and Svay Chek districts of Banteay Meanchey.

== Administration ==
The Preah Netr Preah district governor reports to Oung Ouen, the Governor of Banteay Meanchey. The following table shows the villages of Preah Netr Preah district by commune.

Khum (commune)	Phum (villages)
Chnuor Mean Chey	Samraong Touch, Pongro, Thma Koul, Proput, Bantoat Baoh, Kouk Treas, Chhnuor, Samraong Thum, Ruessei Khang, Ruessei Kandal, Rumpeak, Kouk Trach
Chob Vari	Chob, Roul Chruk, Prasat, Krasang Thmei, Pradak, Chroab Thmei, Chroab Chas, Kak, Kouk Lun, Phnum Chonhcheang, Chakkrei
Phnum Lieb	Phnum Lieb Kaeut, Phnum Lieb Lech, Troyoung, Tro Louk Cheung, Tro Louk Lech, Tro Louk Tboung, Laote, Rumduol, Pring Chu, Kantrab, Tnaot, Anlong Sar, Kandaol, Kambaor, Kabau, Kampong Krasang
Prasat	Char, Bat Trang, Sampov Lun, Phlov Leav, Ta Am, Ampil, Kandal, Thmei, Ovmal, Tonloab, Kien Banteay, Prasat, Anlong Sar, Kampream
Preah Netr Preah	Paoy Kdoeang, Cheung Voat, Kandal, Post Chas, Paoy Samraong, Paoy Pring, Ta Paen, Sreh Kaeut, Sreh Lech, Kouk Srok, Sramaoch, Peam Sreh, Doun Chaeng, Kon Damrey
Rohal	Rohal, Sala Chheh, Chak, Tep Kaosa, Snay, Anlong Thmei, Popel, Paoy Svay, Ruessei, Prey Moan, Stueng Kambot
Tean Kam	Bantoat Baoh, Tean Kam Lech, Tean Kam Cheung, Tean Kam Tboung, Ou, Ta Un
Tuek Chour	Smach, Paoy Char, Ta Khaek, Kouk kei, Tonloab, Kouk Time, Char Leu, Kantuot, Thmei, Kandal, Tuek Chour, Ta Siev, Kampong Thkov, Ta Pon, Svay L'a, Ta Daek, Samraong, Anlong Vil
Bos Sbov	Trabaek, Kandal, Kouk Thum, Bos Sbov, Soutr Mont, Srah Khtum, Kabau, Kbal Khting, Smach, Boeng Veaeng, Bantoat Baoh, Pring Kaong, Khchas, Khnhaer, Khu Svay, Khvav, Tbaeng

== Demographics ==
The district is subdivided into 9 communes (khum) and 119 villages (phum). According to the 1998 Census, the population of the district was 70,673 persons in 13,232 households in 1998. This population consisted of 33,944 males (48.0%) and 36,729 females (52.0%). With a population of over 70,000 people, Preah Netr Preah has an average population for districts in Banteay Meanchey province. The average household size in Preah Netr Preah is 5.3 persons per household, which is slightly larger than the rural average for Cambodia (5.2 persons). The sex ratio in the district is 92.4%, with significantly more females than males.
