= Kouk Ballangk =

Commune in Mongkol Borei District, Banteay Meanchey Province, Cambodia

Coordinates: 13°28′N 103°06′E

Kouk Ballangk គោកបល្ល័ង្ក
- Commune
- Kouk Ballangk Commune ឃុំគោកបល្ល័ង្ក
- Interactive map of Kouk Ballangk
- Country: Cambodia
- Province: Banteay Meanchey
- District: Mongkol Borei
- Time zone: UTC+07:00 (ICT)
- Geocode: 010204

Kouk Ballangk (Khmer: គោកបល្ល័ង្ក [koːk pallaŋ]) is a commune (khum) of Mongkol Borei District in Banteay Meanchey Province in northwestern Cambodia.

== Villages ==
- Kouk Ballangk
- Ta An
- Pralay Chrey
- Cheung Chab
- Phat Sanday
- Char Thmei
- Ph'av Thmei
- Ta Sal
