= Tuol Pongro =

Tuol Pongro ទួលពង្រ
- Commune
- Tuol Pongro Commune ឃុំទួលពង្រ
- Location within Cambodia
- Coordinates: 13°33′06″N 102°35′38″E
- Country: Cambodia
- Province: Banteay Meanchey
- District: Malai
- Subdivision: 12 villages
- Time zone: UTC+07:00 (ICT)
- Geocode: 010905

Tuol Pongro (Khmer: ទូលពង្រ [tuəl pɔŋrɔː]) is a commune (khum) of Malai District in Banteay Meanchey Province in north-western Cambodia.

== Villages ==
As of 2020, the commune includes 12 villages (phums) as follows.

Geocode	Name	Khmer	IPA
01090501	Tuol Pongro	ទួលពង្រ	[tuəl pɔŋrɔː]
01090502	Kaoh Snuol	កោះស្នួល	[kɑh snuəl]
01090503	Khla Ngoab	ខ្លាងាប់	[kʰlaː ŋoəp]
01090504	Banteay Ti Muoy	បន្ទាយទីមួយ	[ɓɑntiəj tiː muəj]
01090505	Santepheap	សន្តិភាព	[sɑntepʰiəp]
01090506	Ou Ampil	អូរអំពិល	[ʔoː ʔɑmpɨl]
01090507	Reaksmey Meanchey	រស្មីមានជ័យ	[reaʔsməj miəncəj]
	Aphivoat	អភិវឌ្ឍ	[ʔapʰiʋoət]
	Tuol Prasat	ទួលប្រាសាទ	[tuəl praːsaːt]
	Sralau Chrum	ស្រឡៅជ្រំ	[srɑlaw crum]
	Boeng Chhuk	បឹងឈូក	[ɓəŋ cʰuːk]
	Ou Kes	អូរកេស	[ʔoː keːh]
