= Khtum Reay Lech =

Khtum Reay Lech is a village located in the Bat Trang khum (commune), within the Mongkol Borei District of the Banteay Meanchey Province, Cambodia.
