= Or Prasat =

Coordinates: 13°28′N 103°00′E

Or Prasat អូរប្រាសាទ
- Commune
- Or Prasat Commune ឃុំអូរប្រាសាទ
- Interactive map of Or Prasat
- Country: Cambodia
- Province: Banteay Meanchey
- District: Mongkol Borei
- Time zone: UTC+07:00 (ICT)
- Geocode: 010206

Or Prasat (Khmer: អូរប្រាសាទ [ʔoː praːsaːt]) is a commune (khum) of Mongkol Borei District in Banteay Meanchey Province in western Cambodia.

== Villages ==
- Phnum Thum Tboung
- Phnum Prasat
- Phnum Thum Cheung
- Chamkar Louk
- Phnum Thum Thmei
- Anlong Sdei
- Kouk Thnong Kaeut
- Kouk Thnong Kandal
- Ou Snguot
- Ou Prasat
- Kouk Ampil
- Ra Chamkar Chek
- Pou Rieng
- Rung Krabau
