= Mongkol Borey district =

Mongkol Borey មង្គលបូរី
- District
- Mongkol Borey District ស្រុកមង្គលបូរី
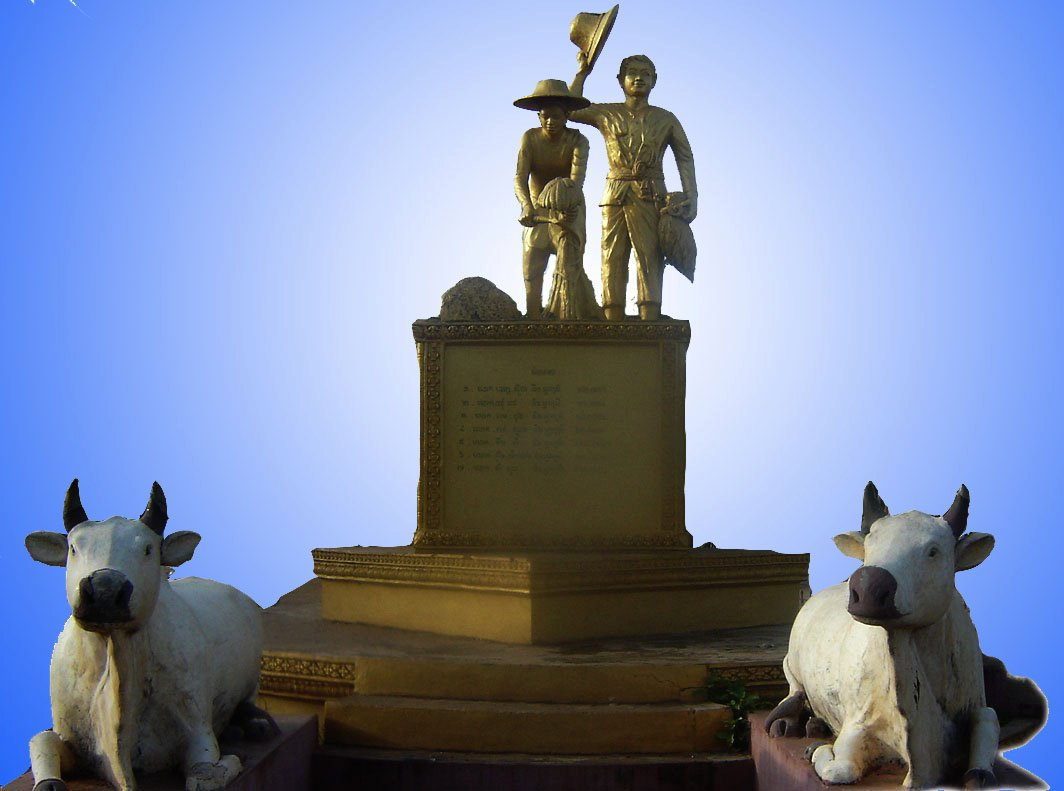
- Statue as a symbol of Mongkol Borey District

- Map showing the location of the district within Banteay Meanchey Province.

- Location in Cambodia
- Coordinates: 13°32′30″N 103°1′30″E
- Country: Cambodia
- Province: Banteay Meanchey
- Capital: Mongkol Borey
- Subdivisions: 13 khums

Government
  - Governor: Try Narin

Population (2019)
  - Total: 187,286
- Time zone: UTC+07:00 (ICT)
- Area code: 54
- Geocode: 0102

Mongkol Borey (Khmer: មង្គលបូរី [mɔŋkɔl ɓoːrəj], lit. 'The City of Happiness') is a district (srok) in the south of Banteay Meanchey Province, in northwestern Cambodia. The district capital is the town of Mongkol Borey, around nine kilometres south of the provincial capital of Serei Saophoan by road. The district shares a border with Battambang Province to the south. The main railway line from Phnom Penh to Poipet on the border with Thailand runs through the district from north to south.

The district is easily accessed by road from Serei Saophoan (9 km) Battambang (60 km), and Siem Reap (110 km). Mongkol Borey district is one of the smallest districts in Banteay Meanchey Province by area and only Serei Saophoan Municipality is smaller. However, it has the largest district population in the province due to its central location and transport infrastructure. National Highway 5 which begins in Phnom Penh and ends at Poipet and the National railway bisect the district in parallel running from north to south. National road 160 begins near the centre of the district and runs southwest into Pailin.

== History ==
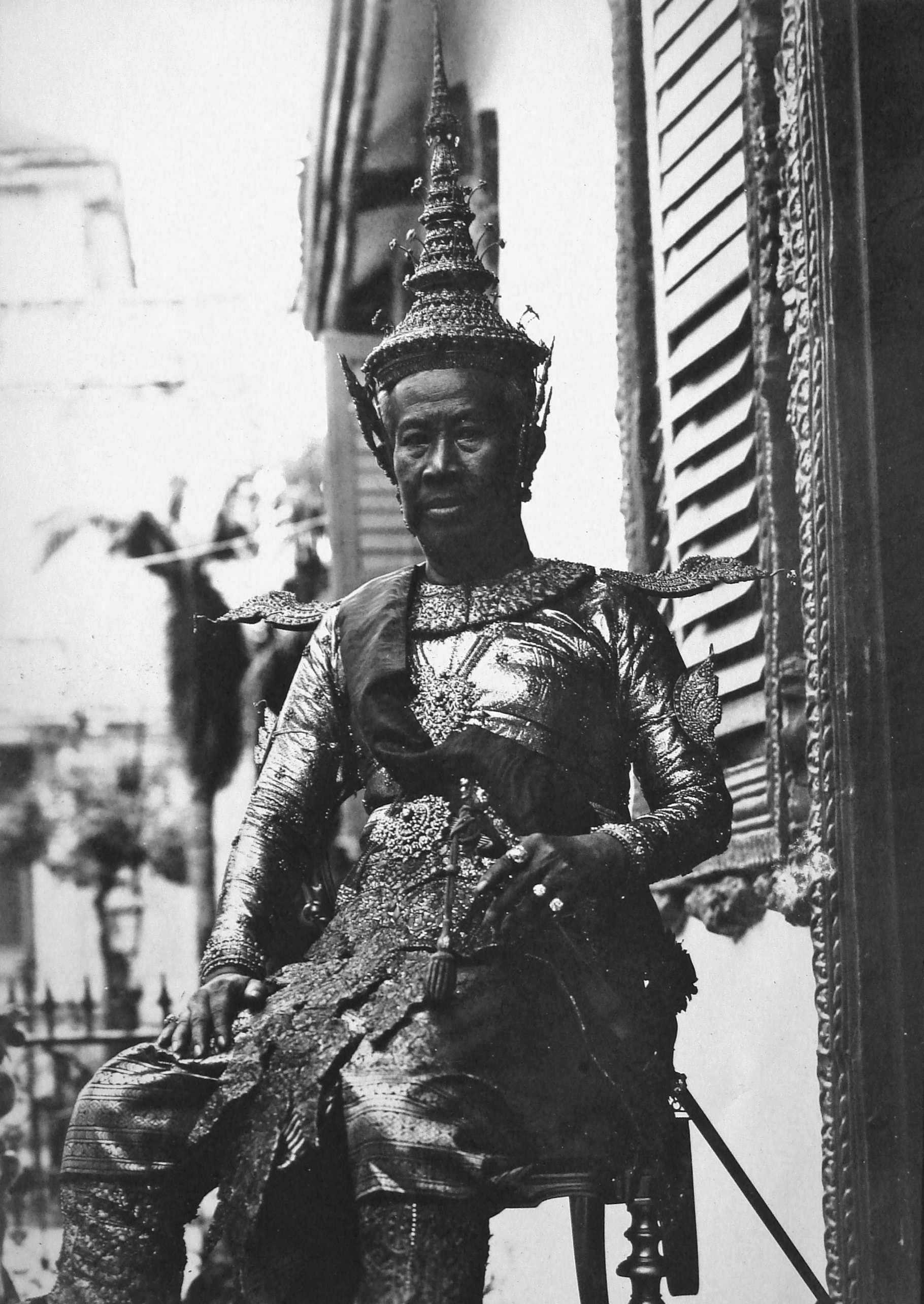
King Sisowath of Cambodia was born in Mongkol Borey (then under Siamese rule) on 7 September 1840.

The history of Mongkol Borey District before the 18th century is unclear, although it is likely that it was part of Battambang province. However, the first record of the city was first mentioned in the chronicle of Rama III of Siam that the city was established in 1833 and was first assigned to Ang Duang. From the 18th century until 1907, it was part of Phra Tabong province of Thailand. At that time the Siamese controlled the area that is modern Banteay Meanchey, Oddar Meanchey, Siem Reap, Pailin and Battambang Provinces. Under the French-Siamese treaty of 23 March 1907, these parts of Cambodia were returned. At this time the area around Serei Sophorn was part of Serei Sophorn District of Battambang. Between 1925 and 1940 a number of new Battambang districts were created, including Mongkol Borey. In 1988 the five northern districts of Battambang were separated to form the new province of Banteay Meanchey.

It is the birthplace of King Sisowath (then part of Battambang province) who was King of Cambodia from 1904 to 1927.

== Location ==
Mongkol Borey district lies in the south of the province and shares a border with Battambang Province. From the north clockwise, Mongkol Borey borders Serei Saophoan District to the north. The eastern border of the district is shared with Preah Netr Preah district. The Mongkol Borey River forms part of the eastern district boundary towards Preah Netr Preah. To the south the district shares a border with Thmor Koal and Bavel Districts of Battambang Province. The western border of the district joins with Malai and Ou Chrov Districts of Banteay Meanchey.

== Administration ==
The Mongkol Borey district governor is Roth Dasinong (Khmer: រ័ត្ន ដាសុីណង់), who works under the administration of Oum Reatrey (Khmer: អ៊ុំ រាត្រី), the Governor of Banteay Meanchey Province. The following table shows the villages of Mongkol Borey District by commune.

Khum (communes)	Phum (villages)	Geocode
Banteay Neang	Ou Thum, Phnum, Banteay Neang, Kouk Pnov, Trang, Pongro, Kouk Tonloab, Trabaek, Khile, Samraong Pen, Dang Run Lech, Dang Run Kaeut, Ou Snguot, Prey Changha Lech, Prey Changha Kaeut, Ou Andoung Lech, Ou Andoung Kandal, Ou Andoung Kaeut, Kouk Kduoch	010201
Bat Trang	Khtum Reay Lech, Khtum Reay Kaeut, Anlong Thngan Kaeut, Anlong Thngan Lech, Bang Bat Lech, Bang Bat Kaeut, Bat Trang, Bat Trang Thum Lech, Bat Trang Thum Kaeut, Bang Bat Touch, Preaek Chik	010202
Chamnaom	Pralay Char, Rongvean Lech, Rongvean Kaeut, Chamnaom Lech, Chamnaom Kaeut, Roung Kou Daeum, Roung Kou Kandal, Roung Kou Chong, Peam Roung kou, Ta Sal, Chuor Khchas, Boeng Tras, Dang Trang, Srae Prey, Bos Tonloab, Ta Bun, Kouk Ponley, Say Samon, Damnak Preas Ang	010203
Kouk Ballangk	Kouk Ballangk, Ta An, Pralay Chrey, Cheung Chab, Phat Sanday, Char Thmei, Ph'av Thmei, Ta Sal	010204
Koy Maeng	Koy Maeng, Sdei Leu, Phlov Siem, Ta Nong, Angkar Khmau, Kasang Thmei, Stueng Chas, Sdei Kraom	010205
Ou Prasat	Phnum Thum Tboung, Phnum Prasat, Phnum Thum Cheung, Chamkar Louk, Phnum Thum Thmei, Anlong Sdei, Kouk Thnong Kaeut, Kouk Thnong Kandal, Ou Snguot, Ou Prasat, Kouk Ampil, Ra Chamkar Chek, Pou Rieng, Rung Krabau	010206
Phnum Touch	Phnum Touch Tboung, Phnum Touch Cheung, Thnal Bat, Ou Nhor, Boeng Tras, Monourom, Paoy Ta Sek, Prey Totueng, Boeng Reang, Voat Thmei	010207
Rohat Tuek	Pou Pir Daeum, Rohat Tuek, Thnal Bat, Kramol, Khtum Chrum, Chak Lech, Doun Mul, Preaek Samraong, Ou Dangkao, Chamkar Chek, Ou Chuob, Ka Svay, Chak Kaeut	010208
Ruessei Kraok	Anhchanh, Neang Ket, Praek Ropou, Sala Daeng, Samraong, Anlong Mean Trop, Chamkar Ta Daok, Pralay Luong Kraom, Luong, Ou Ta Kol, Pralay Luong Leu, Kouk Svay, Ou Ta Ma, Kaoh Kaev, Phasi Sra, Ruessei Kraom, Chumteav	010209
Sambuor	Chhnaeum Meas, Sranal, La, Ta Meaeng Pok, Sambuor, Doun Loek, Kbal Krabei, Srah Chhuk, Srae Prey, Chaek Angkar, Thma Dab	010210
Soea	Ta Mau, Ansam Chek, Tnaot, Buor, Bos Laok, Soea, Boeng Touch, Phlov Damrei Leu, Phlov Damrei Kraom, Ou Soea, Kouk Samraong, Balang Chrey, Ou Choub Thmey	010211
Srah Reang	Ta In Muoy, Ta In Pir, Krouch, Chamkar Chek, Srah Reang, Ta Chan, Kouk Srok, Kouk Chrab, Kouk Krasang	010212
Ta Lam	Preah Srae, Ta Lam Kandal, Ta Lam Chong, Boeng Khleang Lech, Chong Kouk, Boeng Khleang Kaeut, Khla Kham Chhkae, Boeng Veaeng	010213

== Economy ==
Mongkol Borey is one of the largest agricultural districts in Banteay Meanchey Province. The majority of the population work as farmers and the remainder run small businesses, work for the government and other private institutions. Due to its geographical advantage, trading with the neighboring country, Thailand, also plays an important role in the district. Most larger businesses in the district are controlled by Chinese Cambodians including jewelry stores, rice mills, and other trading stores in the markets. Some people also do business with the Thais at Rong Kluea Market, which is the border trade market between Cambodia and Thailand. Due to the instability of farming, job seeking and aiming to improve the living condition have forced some of the population to flee hometown to the larger cities like Phnom Penh and Siem Reap for employment and schooling.

== Demographics ==
The district is subdivided into 13 communes (khum) and 159 villages (phum). According to the 1998 Census, the population of the district was 138,190 persons in 25,754 households in 1998. This population consisted of 67,821 males (49.1%) and 70,369 females (50.9%). With a population of over 130,000 people, Mongkol Borey has by far the largest district populations in Banteay Meanchey Province. The average household size in Mongkol Borey is 5.4 persons per household, which is slightly larger than the rural average for Cambodia (5.2 persons). The sex ratio in the district is 96.4%, with slightly more females than males.
