= Ta Lam =

Coordinates: 13°31′N 103°03′E

Ta Lam ឃុំតាឡំ
- Commune
- Location within Cambodia
- Country: Cambodia
- Province: Banteay Meanchey
- District: Mongkol Borei District
- Villages: 8
- Time zone: UTC+7 (ICT)
- Geocode: 010213

Ta Lam is a khum (commune) of Mongkol Borei District in Banteay Meanchey Province in western Cambodia.

== Villages ==
- Preah Srae
- Ta Lam Kandal
- Ta Lam Chong
- Boeng Khleang Lech
- Chong Kouk
- Boeng Khleang Kaeut
- Khla Kham Chhkae
- Boeng Veaeng
