= Ta Kong =

Coordinates: 13°29′N 102°44′E

Ta Kong តាគង់
- Commune
- Ta Kong Commune ឃុំតាគង់
- Interactive map of Ta Kong
- Country: Cambodia
- Province: Banteay Meanchey
- District: Malai
- Subdivision: 7 villages
- Time zone: UTC+07:00 (ICT)

Ta Kong (Khmer: តាគង់ [taː kɔŋ]) is a commune (khum) of Malai District in Banteay Meanchey Province in north-western Cambodia.

== Villages ==
Name	Khmer	IPA
Ballang	បល្ល័ង្ក	[ɓallaŋ]
Chaeng Maeng	ចែងម៉ែង	[caeŋ maeŋ]
Chrey	ជ្រៃ	[crəj]
Khcheay	ខ្ជាយ	[kʰciəj]
Paoy Angkor	ប៉ោយអង្គរ	[paoj ʔɑŋkɔː]
Srah Phluoh	ស្រះភ្លោះ	[srah pʰluəh]
Ta Kong	តាគង់	[taː kɔŋ]
