= Rohat Tuek =

Rohat Tuek រហាត់ទឹក
- Commune
- Rohat Tuek Commune ឃុំរហាត់ទឹក
- Location within Cambodia
- Coordinates: 13°29′N 102°59′E
- Country: Cambodia
- Province: Banteay Meanchey
- District: Mongkol Borei
- Time zone: UTC+07:00 (ICT)
- Geocode: 010208

Rohat Tuek (Khmer: រហាត់ទឹក [rɔːhat tɨk]) is a commune (khum) and village of Mongkol Borei District in Banteay Meanchey Province in western Cambodia.

== Villages ==
- Pou Pir Daeum (ពោធិ៍ពីរដើម)
- Rohat Tuek (រហាត់ទឹក)
- Thnal Bat (ថ្នល់បត់)
- Kramol
- Khtum Chrum
- Chak Lech
- Doun Mul
- Preaek Samraong (ព្រែកសំរោង)
- Ou Dangkao (អូរដង្កោ)
- Chamkar Chek (ចំការចេក)
- Ou Chuob
- Ka Svay
- Chak Kaeut
