= Soea =

Coordinates: 13°24′N 102°56′E

Soea សឿ
- Commune
- Soea Commune ឃុំសឿ
- Country: Cambodia
- Province: Banteay Meanchey
- District: Mongkol Borei District
- Villages: 13
- Time zone: UTC+07:00 (ICT)
- Geocode: 010211

Soea (Khmer: សឿ [sɨə]) is a commune (khum) of Mongkol Borei District in Banteay Meanchey Province in western Cambodia.

== Villages ==
- Ta Mau
- Ansam Chek
- Tnaot
- Buor
- Bos Laok
- Soea
- Boeng Touch
- Phlov Damrei Leu
- Phlov Damrei Kraom
- Ou Soea
- Kouk Samraong
- Balang Chrey
- Ou Choub Thmey
