= Prasat, Preah Netr Preah =

Prasat ឃុំប្រាសាទ
- Commune
- Location within Cambodia
- Coordinates: 13°26′55″N 103°21′50″E
- Country: Cambodia
- Province: Banteay Meanchey
- District: Preah Netr Preah
- Villages: 14
- Time zone: UTC+7 (ICT)
- Geocode: 010404

Prasat is a khum (commune) of Preah Netr Preah District in Banteay Meanchey Province in north-western Cambodia.

== Villages ==
- Char
- Bat Trang
- Sampov Lun
- Phlov Leav
- Ta Am
- Ampil
- Kandal
- Thmei
- Ovmal
- Tonloab
- Kien Banteay
- Prasat
- Anlong Sar
- Kampream
