= Souphi =

Souphi ឃុំសូភី
- Commune
- Location within Cambodia
- Coordinates: 13°38′45″N 102°49′28″E
- Country: Cambodia
- Province: Banteay Meanchey
- District: Ou Chrov District
- Villages: 5
- Time zone: UTC+07
- Geocode: 010506

Souphi is a khum (commune) of Ou Chrov District in Banteay Meanchey Province in north-western Cambodia.

== Villages ==
- Souphi Cheung(សុភីជើង)
- Souphi Kandal(សុភីកណ្ដាល)
- Souphi Tboung(សុភីត្បូង)
- Kouk Chak
- Kouk Prich Chak Thmey
