= Soengh =

Soengh ឃុំសឹង្ហ
- Commune
- Location within Cambodia
- Coordinates: 13°42′49″N 102°50′19″E
- Country: Cambodia
- Province: Banteay Meanchey
- District: Ou Chrov District
- Villages: 8
- Time zone: UTC+07
- Geocode: 010507

Soengh is a khum (commune) of Ou Chrov District in Banteay Meanchey Province in north-western Cambodia.

== Villages ==
- Soeng Lech(សឹង្ឃលិច)
- Roka(រកា)
- Anlong Svay(អន្លង់ស្វាយ)
- Soeng Tboung(សឹង្ឃត្បូង)
- Phkoam(ផ្គាំ)
- Pongro(ពង្រ)
- Tnaot Kandal(ត្នោតកណ្ដាល)
- Run(រុន)
