= Mongkol Borey (town) =

Mongkol Borey មង្គលបូរី
- Town
- Location within Cambodia
- Coordinates: 13°28′N 103°10′E
- Country: Cambodia
- Province: Banteay Meanchey
- District: Mongkol Borey
- Time zone: UTC+07:00 (ICT)

Mongkol Borey (Khmer: មង្គលបូរី [mɔŋkɔl ɓoːrəj]) is a town and seat of Mongkol Borey District in Banteay Meanchey Province in north-western Cambodia. It is located 9 kilometres south of Serei Saophoan, the province's capital.

== Name ==
The name Mongkol Borey is a derivation from Sanskrit Maṅgalapurī, meaning "the blessed city". A 1036 inscription from Vat Baset (near Battambang) mentions a sruk (village or district) called Manggalapura (Old Khmer: Maṅgalapura), which Saveros Pou and O. W. Wolters tentatively suggested may be the same place as modern Mongkol Borey.
