= Samraong =

Samraong may refer to various places in Cambodia:

- Samraong, Banteay Meanchey (commune)
- Samraong, Banteay Meanchey (village)
- Samraong, Kampong Cham (commune), a commune of Prey Chhor District, Kampong Cham, Cambodia
- Samraong District, a district of Oddar Meanchey Province, Cambodia
- Samraong (town), the capital of Oddar Meanchey Province, Cambodia
- Samraŏng District, a district of Takeo Province, Cambodia
