= Changha =

Commune in Banteay Meanchey, Cambodia

Coordinates: 13.6481°N 102.8886°E

Changha ឃុំចង្ហា
- Commune
- Interactive map of Changha
- Country: Cambodia
- Province: Banteay Meanchey
- District: Ou Chrov District
- Villages: 6
- Time zone: UTC+07

Changha (Khmer: ឃុំចង្ហា) is a khum (commune) of Ou Chrov District in Banteay Meanchey Province in north-western Cambodia.

== Villages ==
- Boeng Seila(បឹង សីលា)
- Ta Chrueng(តាច្រឹង)
- Ta Phaok(តាភក)
- Paoy Voat(ប៉ូយវត្ដ)
- Chhuk
- Chrey(ជ្រៃ)
