= Poipet casino hotel fire =

Disaster in Cambodia

- Date: 28 December 2022
- Time: 11:30 pm (ICT, UTC+07:00)
- Location: Poipet, Cambodia; 13.66°N 102.55°E
- Cause: (preliminary) Overheated wires caused by New Year's Day decorations
- Deaths: 27
- Injuries: 112

On 28 December 2022, a fire at a casino hotel in Poipet, Cambodia, killed at least 27 people.

== Background ==
Poipet is a border town in Banteay Meanchey Province, Cambodia which is about 200 m (660 ft) from the Thai border, just opposite of the Thai city of Aranyaprathet. Under Cambodian law gambling is prohibited for citizens, but is allowed for foreigners. Because most types of gambling are also illegal in Thailand, Poipet is popular with Thai gamblers. The Grand Diamond City is a casino hotel which backs onto the Thai border. The business employs 400 staff. The casino was owned by fugitive Thai politician Vatana Asavahame, aged 86 at the time of the fire, who was sentenced in absentia to three years in jail for land-procurement fraud.

== Fire ==
At 23:30 on 28 December 2022, a fire broke out in the Grand Diamond City when hundreds of people were in the building. At least 27 people were killed and 112 others were injured. Most of the dead died of smoke inhalation or were killed after jumping from high floors to escape the fire. Seventeen of the dead were Thai nationals, and one each were Nepalese, Malaysian, and Chinese. At least 27 of the injured were treated in hospitals.
