= Bát Tráng (Cambodia) =

Commune in Mongkol Borei District, Banteay Meanchey Province, Cambodia

Bat Trang បត់ត្រង់
- Commune
- Bat Trang Commune ឃុំបត់ត្រង់
- Location within Cambodia
- Coordinates: 13°33′N 102°49′E
- Country: Cambodia
- Province: Banteay Meanchey
- District: Mongkol Borei
- Time zone: UTC+07:00 (ICT)
- Geocode: 010202

Bat Trang (Khmer: បត់ត្រង់, romanized: Bát Tráng [ɓɑt trɑŋ]) is a commune (khum) of Mongkol Borei District in Banteay Meanchey Province in western Cambodia.

== Villages ==
- Khtum Reay Lech
- Khtum Reay Kaeut
- Anlong Thngan Kaeut
- Anlong Thngan Lech
- Bang Bat Lech
- Bang Bat Kaeut
- Bat Trang
- Bat Trang Thum Lech
- Bat Trang Thum Kaeut
- Bang Bat Touch
- Preaek Chik
