= Bat Trang =

Bat Trang may refer to:

- Bat Trang (Cambodia), a commune in Cambodia
- Bát Tràng, an old village of Hanoi, Vietnam
- Bát Tràng porcelain, a type of ceramics made in the village of the same name
