= Tuek Chour =

Coordinates: 13°39′N 103°21′E

Tuek Chour ឃុំទឹកជោរ
- Commune
- Interactive map of Tuek Chour
- Country: Cambodia
- Province: Banteay Meanchey
- District: Preah Netr Preah
- Villages: 18
- Time zone: UTC+7 (ICT)
- Geocode: 010408

Tuek Chour is a khum (commune) of Preah Netr Preah District in Banteay Meanchey Province in north-western Cambodia.

== Villages ==
- Smach
- Paoy Char
- Ta Khaek
- Kouk kei
- Tonloab
- Kouk Tiem
- Char Leu
- Kantuot
- Thmei
- Kandal
- Tuek Chour
- Ta Siev
- Kampong Thkov
- Ta Pon
- Svay L'a
- Ta Daek
- Samraong
- Anlong Vil
