= Rohal =

Coordinates: 13°37′N 103°14′E

Rohal ឃុំរហាល
- Commune
- Interactive map of Rohal
- Country: Cambodia
- Province: Banteay Meanchey
- District: Preah Netr Preah
- Villages: 11
- Time zone: UTC+7 (ICT)
- Geocode: 010406

Rohal is a khum (commune) of Preah Netr Preah District in Banteay Meanchey Province in north-western Cambodia.

== Villages ==
- Rohal
- Sala Chheh
- Chak
- Tep Kaosa
- Snay
- Anlong Thmei
- Popel
- Paoy Svay
- Roessei
- Prey Moan
- Stoeng Kambot
