= Preah Ponlea =

Preah Ponlea ឃុំព្រះពន្លា
- Commune
- Interactive map of Preah Ponlea
- Coordinates: 13°35′15″N 102°59′09″E
- Country: Cambodia
- Province: Banteay Meanchey
- District: Serei Saophoan District
- Villages: 7
- Time zone: UTC+07

Preah Ponlea is a sangkat (commune) of Serei Saophoan District in Banteay Meanchey Province in north-western Cambodia.

== Villages ==
- Chak(ឆក)
- Phum Muoy(ភូមិមួយ)
- Phum Bey(ភូមិបី)
- Phum Buon(ភូមិបួន)
- Prey Ruessei(ព្រៃឬស្សី)
- Preah Ponlea(ព្រះពន្លា)
- Kbal Spean(ក្បាលស្ពាន)
