= Chob Vari =

Commune in Preah Netr Preah District, Banteay Meanchey, Cambodia

Chob Vari ឃុំជប់វារី
- Commune
- Location within Cambodia
- Coordinates: 13°39′47″N 103°10′07″E
- Country: Cambodia
- Province: Banteay Meanchey
- District: Preah Netr Preah
- Villages: 11
- Time zone: UTC+7 (ICT)
- Geocode: 010402

Chob Vari (Khmer: ឃុំជប់វារី) is a khum (commune) of the Preah Netr Preah District in Banteay Meanchey Province in north-western Cambodia.

== Villages ==
- Chob
- Roul Chruk
- Prasat
- Krasang Thmei
- Pradak
- Chroab Thmei
- Chroab Chas
- Kak
- Kouk Lun
- Phnum Chonhcheang
- Chakkrei
