= Phniet =

Phniet ឃុំភ្នៀត
- Commune
- Interactive map of Phniet
- Country: Cambodia
- Province: Banteay Meanchey
- District: Serei Saophoan District
- Villages: 7
- Time zone: UTC+07

Phniet is a khum (commune) of Serei Saophoan District in Banteay Meanchey Province in north-western Cambodia.

== Villages ==
- Kantuot(កន្ទួត)
- Kampring(កំព្រីង)
- Phniet
- Neak Ta(អ្នកថា)
- Thmei(ថ្មី)
- Bangruh(បង្រះ)
- Sala Krau(សាលាក្រៅ)
