= Tuek Thla =

Tuek Thla may refer to several places in Cambodia:

- Tuek Thla, Banteay Meanchey
- Tuek Thla, Battambang
- Tuek Thla, Kampong Speu
- Tuek Thla, Phnom Penh
- Tuek Thla, Prey Veng
- Tuek Thla, Siem Reap
- Tuek Thla, Sihanouk
- Tuek Thla, Takeo
