= Ou Sampoar =

Ou Sampoar ឃុំអូរសំព័រ
- Commune
- Location within Cambodia
- Coordinates: 13°33′26″N 102°29′56″E
- Country: Cambodia
- Province: Banteay Meanchey
- District: Malai District
- Villages: 4
- Time zone: UTC+07
- Geocode: 010903

Ou Sampoar is a khum (commune) of Malai District in Banteay Meanchey Province in north-western Cambodia.

== Villages ==
- Ou Sampoar Moy
- Ou Sampoar Pi
- Kbal Tomnob
- Bantey Tipi
