= Preah Netr Preah (town) =

- Town
- Location within Cambodia
- Coordinates: 13°33′N 103°8′E
- Country: Cambodia
- Province: Banteay Meanchey
- District: Preah Netr Preah District

Preah Netr Preah is a town and seat of Preah Netr Preah District in Banteay Meanchey Province in north-western Cambodia.
