= Koub =

Commune in Ou Chrov District, Banteay Meanchey, Cambodia

Koub ឃុំកូប
- Commune
- Location within Cambodia
- Coordinates: 13°36′34″N 102°46′49″E
- Country: Cambodia
- Province: Banteay Meanchey
- District: Ou Chrov District
- Villages: 11
- Time zone: UTC+07
- Postal code: 01401
- Geocode: 010502

Koub (Khmer: ឃុំកូប) is a khum (commune) of Ou Chrov District in Banteay Meanchey Province in north-western Cambodia.

== Villages ==
- Yeang thmei(យាងថ្មី)
- Mak Heun(ម៉ក់ហឺន)
- Veang Muong(វាំងមួង)
- Koub Kaeut(កូបកើត)
- Khai Dan(ខៃដន)
- Naka Chhay(ណាកាឆាយ)
- Koub Lech(កូបលិច)
- Koub Cheung(កូបជើង)
- Ou Chrov(អូរជ្រៅ)
- Souriya(សុរិយា)
- Koun Trei(កូនត្រី)
