= Ou Beichoan Commune =

Ou Beichoan ឃុំអូរបីជាន់
- Commune
- Location within Cambodia
- Coordinates: 13°44′16″N 102°44′27″E
- Country: Cambodia
- Province: Banteay Meanchey
- District: Ou Chrov District
- Villages: 11
- Time zone: UTC+07
- Geocode: 010509

Ou Beichoan is a khum (commune) of Ou Chrov District in Banteay Meanchey Province in north-western Cambodia.

== Villages ==
- Choan Banteay Thmei(ជាន់បន្ទាយថ្មី)
- Chouk Chey(ជោគជ័យ)
- Ou Bei Choan(អូរបីជាន់)
- Prasat(ប្រាសាទ)
- Prey Chan (ព្រៃចាន់)
- Preav(ព្រាវ)
- Seila Khmaer(សីលាខ្មែរ)
- Snuol Tret(ស្នូលទ្រេត)
- Thnal Bat(ថ្នល់បត់)
- Tumnob Dach(ទំនប់ដាច់)
- Yeang Dangkum(យាងដង្គុំ)
