= Tean =

Tean may refer to:

In Staffordshire, England

- Tean, Staffordshire, comprising the villages of Lower Tean and Upper Tean
- Tean railway station, a disused station
- The River Tean
- Tean Road Sports Ground, a cricket ground in Cheadle

Other

- Teän, one of the Isles of Scilly off the south-west coast of England
- Tean Kam, a khum in Cambodia
