= Phnum Lieb =

Coordinates: 13°36′N 103°21′E

Phnum Lieb ឃុំភ្នំលៀប
- Commune
- Interactive map of Phnum Lieb
- Country: Cambodia
- Province: Banteay Meanchey
- District: Preah Netr Preah
- Villages: 16
- Time zone: UTC+7 (ICT)
- Geocode: 010403

Phnum Lieb is a khum (commune) of Preah Netr Preah District in Banteay Meanchey Province in north-western Cambodia.

== Villages ==
Phnum Lieb is composed of 16 villages:

- Phnum Lieb Kaeut
- Phnum Lieb Lech
- Troyoung
- Tro Louk Cheung
- Tro Louk Lech
- Tro Louk Tboung
- Laote
- Rumduol
- Pring Chu
- Kantrab
- Tnaot
- Anlong Sar
- Kandaol
- Kambaor
- Kabau
- Kampong Krasang
