= Ou Sralau =

Ou Sralau ឃុំអូរស្រឡៅ
- Commune
- Location within Cambodia
- Coordinates: 13°33′24″N 102°25′29″E
- Country: Cambodia
- Province: Banteay Meanchey
- District: Malai District
- Villages: 8
- Time zone: UTC+07
- Geocode: 010904

Ou Sralau is a khum (commune) of Malai District in Banteay Meanchey Province in north-western Cambodia.

== Villages ==
- Ou Sralau
- Phnum Kaubei
- Kandaol
- Chheu Teal
- Bueng Reang
- Svay Prey
- Chan Kiri
- Thmei
