= Kuttasat =

Commune in Ou Chrov District, Banteay Meanchey, Cambodia

Coordinates: 13°35′N 102°46′E

Kuttasat ឃុំគុត្តសត
- Commune
- Interactive map of Kuttasat
- Country: Cambodia
- Province: Banteay Meanchey
- District: Ou Chrov District
- Villages: 4
- Time zone: UTC+07

Kuttasat (Khmer: ឃុំគុត្ដសត) is a khum (commune) of Ou Chrov District in Banteay Meanchey Province in north-western Cambodia.

== Villages ==
- Koub Touch(គប់តូច)
- Kaoh Char(កោះចារ)
- Kuttaksat(គុត្តសត)
- Yeay Ort(យាយអត)
