= Kaoh Pong Satv =

Commune in Serei Saophoan District, Banteay Meanchey, Cambodia

Coordinates: 13°35′N 103°01′E

Kaoh Pong Satv ឃុំកោះពងសត្វ
- Commune
- Interactive map of Kaoh Pong Satv
- Country: Cambodia
- Province: Banteay Meanchey
- District: Serei Saophoan District
- Villages: 5
- Time zone: UTC+07

Kaoh Pong Satv (Khmer: កោះពងសត្វ) is a khum (commune) of Serei Saophoan District in Banteay Meanchey Province in north-western Cambodia.

== Villages ==
- Kaoh Pong Satv(កោះពងសត្វ)
- Ta Sokh(តាសុក)
- Preah Angk(ព្រះអង្គ)
- Snay Dangkot(ស្នាយដង្គត់)
- Angkea Bos(អង្គារបុស្ស)
