= Chnuor Mean Chey =

Commune of Preah Netr Preah District, Banteay Meanchey, Cambodia

Chnuor Mean Chey ឃុំឈ្នួរមានជ័យ
- Commune
- Location within Cambodia
- Coordinates: 13°38′00″N 103°06′08″E
- Country: Cambodia
- Province: Banteay Meanchey
- District: Preah Netr Preah
- Villages: 12
- Time zone: UTC+7 (ICT)
- Geocode: 010401

Chnuor Mean Chey (Khmer: ឃុំឈ្នួរមានជ័យ) is a khum (communes) of Preah Netr Preah District in Banteay Meanchey Province in north-western Cambodia.

== Villages ==
- Samraong Touch
- Pongro
- Thma Koul
- Proput
- Bantoat Baoh
- Kouk Treas
- Chhnuor
- Samraong Thum
- Ruessei Khang
- Ruessei Kandal
- Rumpeak
- Kouk Trach
