= Poipet Municipality =

Coordinates: 13°39′26″N 102°33′54″E

Poipet Municipality ក្រុងប៉ោយប៉ែត Krong Poipet
- Municipality
- Interactive map of Poipet Municipality
- Country: Cambodia
- Province: Banteay Meanchey
- Seat: Poipet

Government
  - Mayor: Keat Hul (CPP)

Population (2019)
  - Total: 98,934
  - Density: 396.7/km^{2} (1,027/sq mi)
- Time zone: UTC+07:00 (ICT)
- Postal code: 011000
- Area code: 054

Poipet Municipality

Khmer name
- Khmer: ក្រុងប៉ោយប៉ែត UNGEGN: Krŏng Paôypêt; GD: Krong Paoypaet; ALA-LC: Krung P″oip″aet; IPA: [kroŋ paojpaet]

Poipet Municipality (Khmer: ក្រុងប៉ោយប៉ែត [kroŋ paojpaet]) is a municipality in the west of Banteay Meanchey province in north-western Cambodia.

== Administration ==
Poipet Municipality is subdivided into three communes (sangkat), and further subdivided into 26 villages.

Name	Khmer	Subdivisions
Nimit	និមិត្ត	15 villages: Nimit 1, Nimit 2, Nimit 3, Nimit 4, Ou Chrov, Dong Aranh, Soriya, Nimit Thmey, Thma Sen, Kon Damrei, Kop Thum, Anlong Svay, Raksmey Sereypheap, Raksmey Samaki, Soksan
Poipet	ប៉ោយប៉ែត	6 villages: Kbal Spean, Palilai, Tuol Pongro, Prey Kob, Tuol Prasat, Pracheathoam
Phsar Kandal	ផ្សារកណ្ដាល	5 villages: Kilo Lekh Buon, Andoung Thma Meas, Stueng Bat, Ou Neang, Oruessei
