= Mkak =

Sangkat in Krong Serei Saophoan, Banteay Meanchey, Cambodia

Coordinates: 13°40′N 102°58′E

Mkak សង្កាត់ម្កាក់
- Commune
- Interactive map of Mkak
- Country: Cambodia
- Province: Banteay Meanchey
- Municipality: Serei Saophoan Municipality
- Villages: 7
- Time zone: UTC+07

Mkak (Khmer: សង្កាត់ម្កាក់) is a sangkat of Krong Serei Saophoan (previously, a khum/commune of Serei Saophoan District) in Banteay Meanchey Province in north-western Cambodia.

== Villages ==
- Mkak(ម្កាក់)
- Kbal Spean(ក្បាលស្ពាន)
- Ta Ma(តាម៉ា)
- Kouk Lieb(កូកលាប)
- Chhuk(ឈុក)
- Doun Lei(ដូនឡី)
- Baek Chan(បែកចាន)
