= Preah Netr Preah =

Preah Netr Preah ឃុំព្រះនេត្រព្រះ
- Commune
- Location within Cambodia
- Coordinates: 13°35′03″N 103°09′53″E
- Country: Cambodia
- Province: Banteay Meanchey
- District: Preah Netr Preah
- Villages: 14
- Time zone: UTC+7 (ICT)
- Geocode: 010405

Preah Netr Preah is a khum (commune) of Preah Netr Preah District in Banteay Meanchey Province in north-western Cambodia.

== Villages ==
- Preah Paoy Kdoeang
- Cheung Voat
- Kandal
- Post Chas
- Paoy Samraong
- Paoy Pring
- Ta Paen
- Sreh Kaeut
- Sreh Lech
- Kouk Srok
- Sramaoch
- Peam Sreh
- Doun Chaeng
- Kon Damrey
