= Time in Vietnam =

Reunified Vietnam follows Indochina Time (ICT), which is seven hours ahead of UTC, ICT is used all year round as Vietnam does not observe daylight saving time. Vietnam shares the same time zone with Thailand, Cambodia (With Alaska Time) unchanged Christmas Island, Laos, and Western Indonesia.

Vietnam referenced ISO 8601 under in 1998 and then created its own standard TCVN 6398-1:1998.

== History ==
- After Phủ Liễn Observatory was built, French Indochina announced all states (consisting of north-Vietnamese Tonkin, central-Vietnamese Annam, south-Vietnamese Cochinchina, as well as Cambodia, Laos and Chinese Guangzhouwan) were part of 104°17′17″E longitude east of Paris meridian 2°20′14″E, or 106°37′30″E from Greenwich Mean Time from 00:00, 1 July 1906 onward.
- In 1911, Metropolitan France adopted UTC+00:00 (the solar time of Greenwich) as its official time, and used it until 1940 (with UTC+01:00 used during the summers from 1916 to 1940), forcing French Indochina observed UTC+07:00 from 00:00, 1 May 1911.
- Following change in time zone of Vichy authorities, French Indochina was integrated to UTC+08:00 skipping 60 minutes at 23:00, 31 December 1942.
- The Empire of Japan occupied Vichy French Indochina fully. Indochinese regions thereafter followed Tokyo time zone (UTC+09:00), skipping 60 minutes at 23:00, 14 March 1945.
- By August General Uprising, the Fall of Empire of Vietnam and the Proclamation of Independence of the Democratic Republic of Vietnam, Provisional Uniform Government of the Democratic Republic of Vietnam took control, announcing UTC+07:00 as official time zone on 2 September 1945. Whilst, the then under-attack regions of Vietnam, Laos and Cambodia adopted UTC+08:00 and non-attacked regions (at the time and even after the 1954 Geneva Conference) adopted UTC+07:00 from April 1, 1947: Laos (part of Indochina) from 15 April 1954, Hanoi from October 1954, Haiphong from May 1955.
- Under control of State of Vietnam, South Vietnam adopted UTC+07:00 from 00:00, 1 July 1955.
- South Vietnam time zone was changed to UTC+08:00 from 23:00, 31 December 1959, passing 60 minutes.
- North Vietnam confirmed official UTC+07:00 from 1 January 1968.
- Following the Fall of Saigon in April–May 1975, reunified Vietnam then observes UTC+07:00 with Saigon (and other southern parts) delaying 60 minutes on 13 June 1975.

=== Time in French Indochina ===
| Period in use | Time offset from GMT | Notes |
|---|---|---|
| Prior to 1 July 1906 | UTC+07:06:40 | Local mean time |
| 1 July 1906 – 30 April 1911 | UTC+07:06:30 | 106°37'30"E French Time |
| 1 May 1911 – 30 December 1942 | UTC+07:00 | Standard Time Zone |
| 31 December 1942 – 13 March 1945 | UTC+08:00 | Standard Time Zone |
| 14 March 1945 – 1 September 1945 | UTC+09:00 | Tokyo Standard Time |
| 2 September 1945 – Activation of Geneva Accords | UTC+07:00 | Standard Time Zone |

=== Time in North Vietnam ===
| Period in use | Time offset from GMT | Notes |
|---|---|---|
| 2 September 1945 – 31 March 1947 | UTC+07:00 | Hanoi Time Zone |
| 1 April 1947 – Activation of Geneva Accords; After the activation | No Standard Time; UTC+07:00 for zone under peace UTC+08:00 for zone under attacking | |
| 1 January 1968 – 12 June 1975 | UTC+07:00 | Hanoi Time Zone |

=== Time in South Vietnam ===
| Period in use | Time offset from GMT | Notes |
|---|---|---|
| Activation of Geneva Accords – 30 June 1955 | UTC+08:00 | Saigon Standard Time |
| 1 July 1955 – 31 December 1959 | UTC+07:00 | Saigon Standard Time |
| 1 January 1960 – 12 June 1975 | UTC+08:00 | Saigon Standard Time |

=== Time in Reunified Vietnam ===
| Period in use | Time offset from GMT | Notes |
|---|---|---|
| 13 June 1975 – now | UTC+07:00 | Standard Time Zone |

== IANA time zone database ==
The IANA time zone database contains one zone for Reunified Vietnam in the file zone.tab, named Asia/Ho_Chi_Minh. For timestamps in North Vietnam back to 1970 (database cutoff), the database uses the Asia/Bangkok entry.

== See also ==
- ASEAN Common Time (ACT)
- Indochina Time (ICT)
- Time in Cambodia
- Time in Laos
- Time in Thailand
- UTC+08:00
- UTC+09:00

== Bibliography ==
- Trần Tiến Bình (2005), Lịch Việt Nam thế kỷ XX-XXI (1901–2100), Nhà xuất bản Văn hoá Thông tin, Hanoi.
