= Kampong Svay =

Kampong Svay may refer to several places or districts in Cambodia:

- Kampong Svay District in Kampong Thom Province
- Kampong Svay, Banteay Meanchey
