= Tean Kam =

Coordinates: 13°42′N 103°14′E

Tean Kam ឃុំទានកាំ
- Commune
- Interactive map of Tean Kam
- Country: Cambodia
- Province: Banteay Meanchey
- District: Preah Netr Preah
- Villages: 6
- Time zone: UTC+7 (ICT)
- Geocode: 010407

Tean Kam is a khum (commune) of Preah Netr Preah District in Banteay Meanchey Province in north-western Cambodia.

== Villages ==
- Bantoat Baoh
- Tean Kam Lech
- Tean Kam Cheung
- Tean Kam Tboung
- Ou
- Ta Un
