= Samraong, Banteay Meanchey (commune) =

Samraong ឃុំសំរោង
- Commune
- Location within Cambodia
- Coordinates: 13°31′53″N 102°49′42″E
- Country: Cambodia
- Province: Banteay Meanchey
- District: Ou Chrov District
- Villages: 10
- Time zone: UTC+07
- Geocode: 010505

Samraong is a khum (commune) of Ou Chrov District in Banteay Meanchey Province in north-western Cambodia.

== Villages ==
- Banlech(បន្លិច)
- Neak Ta Chhor(អ្នកតាឈរ)
- Samraong(សំរោង)
- Kampong Reab(កំពង់រាប)
- Thmei(ថ្មី)
- Thmenh Trei(ធ្មេញត្រី)
- Bat Trang(បត់ត្រង់)
- Anhchanh(អញ្ចាញ)
- Voat(វត្ដ)
- Kandal(កណ្ដាល)
