= ASEAN Common Time =

Proposed time zone for southeast Asia

Map showing the member states of ASEAN.

The ASEAN Common Time (ACT) is a proposed standard time for all Association of Southeast Asian Nations member states. It was proposed in 1995 by Singapore, and in 2004 and 2015 by Malaysia to make business across countries easier. The proposal failed because of opposition in Thailand and Cambodia, who felt that replacing their countries' current time zones (UTC+07:00) in favour of UTC+08:00 was unfavourable.

Currently, there are four different time zones used by ASEAN countries. UTC+06:30 (Myanmar); UTC+07:00 (Cambodia, Laos, Thailand, Vietnam, and Western Indonesia); UTC+08:00 (Brunei, Central Indonesia, Malaysia, Philippines, and Singapore); and UTC+09:00 (Eastern Indonesia and Timor-Leste).

The proposal would institute UTC+08:00 as the ASEAN Central Time, putting Myanmar at UTC+07:00, and leaving the less populous eastern Indonesia at UTC+09:00. This would result in the vast majority of the region's people and territory lining up at UTC+08:00—in sync with China, Hong Kong, Macau, Taiwan, and Western Australia, while the eastern islands of Indonesia would remain at UTC+09:00—in sync with Japan, South Korea, North Korea, East Timor and Palau.

Some regional businesses have already begun adopting the phrase "ASEAN Common Time", also using the abbreviation ACT, in their press releases, communications, and legal documents. The idea has continued to be under discussion by ASEAN, with Singapore supporting it strongly.

== List ==
ASEAN relation	Country	UTC offset	Time Zone Abbreviation	Notes	Ref
ASEAN members	Myanmar	+06:30	MMT	Some experts suggest that moving to UTC+07:00, rather than UTC+08:00, would be a more natural change.	Myanmar Standard Time
ASEAN members	Thailand	+07:00	ICT	Tried unsuccessfully to switch to UTC+08:00 in 2001 under then-Prime Minister Thaksin Shinawatra. The issue remains under discussion.	Time in Thailand
ASEAN members	Laos	+07:00	ICT		Time in Laos
ASEAN members	Vietnam	+07:00	ICT	From 13 June 1975 after reunification.	Time in Vietnam
ASEAN members	Cambodia	+07:00	ICT		Time in Cambodia
ASEAN members	Indonesia	+07:00	WIB	A single national time zone of UTC+08:00 was once proposed, before being eventually cancelled.	Time in Indonesia
ASEAN members	Indonesia	+08:00	WITA	A single national time zone of UTC+08:00 was once proposed, before being eventually cancelled.	Time in Indonesia
ASEAN members	Indonesia	+09:00	WIT	A single national time zone of UTC+08:00 was once proposed, before being eventually cancelled.	Time in Indonesia
ASEAN members	Singapore	+08:00	SGT/SST	Followed Malaysia to switch to UTC+08:00 on 1 January 1982, except under Japanese occupation of Singapore during World War II.	Singapore Time
ASEAN members	Malaysia	+08:00	MYT/MST	Peninsular Malaysia switched from UTC+07:30 on 1 January 1982, and East Malaysia has used it since 1933, except under Japanese occupation during World War II.	Time in Malaysia
ASEAN members	Brunei	+08:00	BNT/BDT		Time in Brunei
ASEAN members	Philippines	+08:00	PHT/PST	First implemented on 1 January 1845 by redrawing the International Date Line. (Note: The Philippines was one day behind neighbouring countries in Asia since Ferdinand Magellan's arrival on 16 March 1521, then later claimed part of the Viceroyalty of New Spain (Virreinato de Nueva España) known as Spanish Empire on 27 April 1565 until Mexico's independence on 27 September 1821. More than two decades later, on 16 August 1844, then Governor-General Narciso Claveria reformed the Philippines calendar by removing Tuesday, 31 December 1844, to align with the rest of Asia. Monday, 30 December 1844 was immediately followed by Wednesday, 1 January 1845. The change also applied to Caroline Islands, Guam, Marianas Islands, Marshall Islands and Palau for being part of the Captaincy General of the Philippines during those times.) It became permanent on 29 July 1990 when the country ended the use of daylight saving time, then set at UTC+09:00.	Philippine Standard Time
ASEAN members	Timor-Leste	+09:00	TLT		Time in Timor-Leste
ASEAN observer states	Papua New Guinea	+10:00	PGT		Time in Papua New Guinea
ASEAN observer states	Papua New Guinea	+11:00	BST		Time in Papua New Guinea
ASEAN Plus Three	Japan	+09:00	JST		Japan Standard Time
ASEAN Plus Three	South Korea	+09:00	KST		Time in South Korea
ASEAN Plus Three	China	+08:00	CST		Time in China

== See also ==
- Time in Southeast Asia
  - Myanmar Standard Time
  - Philippine Standard Time
  - Singapore Time
  - Time in Brunei
  - Time in Cambodia
  - Time in Indonesia
  - Time in Laos
  - Time in Malaysia
  - Time in Thailand
  - Time in Vietnam
