= Kampong Svay, Banteay Meanchey =

Commune in Serei Saophoan Municipality, Banteay Meanchey, Cambodia

Coordinates: 13°36′N 102°58′E

Kampong Svay ឃុំកំពង់ស្វាយ
- Commune
- Interactive map of Kampong Svay
- Country: Cambodia
- Province: Banteay Meanchey
- Municipality: Serei Saophoan
- Villages: 5
- Time zone: UTC+7 (ICT)

Kampong Svay (Khmer: កំពង់ស្វាយ) is a khum (commune) of Serei Saophoan Municipality in Banteay Meanchey Province in north-western Cambodia.

== Villages ==
- Kampong Svay (កំពង់ស្វាយ)
- Kang Va (កាងវ៉ា)
- Phum Pir (ភូមិពីរ)
- Pongro (ពង្រ)
- Souphi (សុភី)
- Tarang Bal (តារាងបាល់)
