= Banteay Neang =

Commune and village in Mongkol Borei District, Banteay Meanchey, Cambodia

Banteay Neang បន្ទាយនាង
- Commune
- Location within Cambodia
- Coordinates: 13°31′N 103°1′E
- Country: Cambodia
- Province: Banteay Meanchey
- District: Mongkol Borey
- Villages: 18
- Time zone: UTC+7 (ICT)
- Geocode: 010201

Banteay Neang (Khmer: បន្ទាយនាង) is a commune (khum) of Mongkol Borey District in Banteay Meanchey Province in northwestern Cambodia.

National Highway 5 runs north–south through the commune.

== Villages ==
- Banteay Neang
- Ou Thum
- Phnum
- Kouk Pnov
- Trang
- Pongro
- Kouk Tonloab
- Trabaek
- Khile
- Samraong Pen
- Dang Run Lech
- Dang Run Kaeut
- Ou Snguot
- Prey Changha Lech
- Prey Changha Kaeut
- Ou Andoung Lech
- Ou Andoung Kandal
- Ou Andoung Kaeut
- Kouk Kduoch
- Banteay Neang Market
