= Ou Ambel =

Ou Ambel ឃុំអូរអំបិល
- Commune
- Interactive map of Ou Ambel
- Country: Cambodia
- Province: Banteay Meanchey
- District: Serei Saophoan District
- Villages: 5
- Time zone: UTC+07

Ou Ambel is a khum (commune) of Serei Saophoan District in Banteay Meanchey Province in north-western Cambodia.

== Villages ==
- Saesen
- Kourothan
- Roung Masin(រោងម៉ាស៊ីន)
- Prohut
- Ou Ambel(អូរអំបិល)
