= Mongkol Borey River =

River in Cambodia

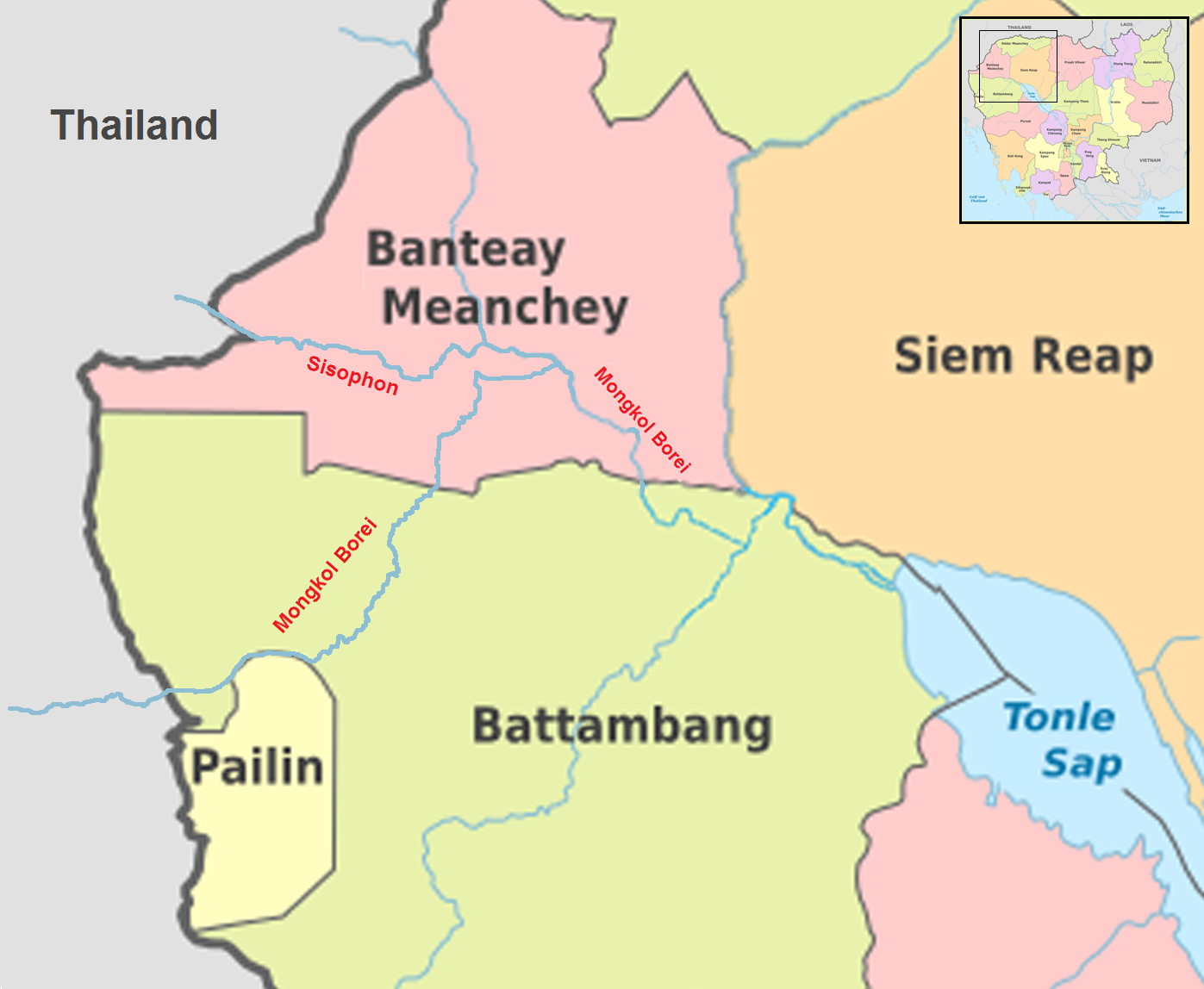
Map showing Mongkol Borey River

The Mongkol Borey River (Khmer: ស្ទឹងមង្គលបុរី [Mang Kul Buo Rei], lit. 'City of Happiness') is a river in Mongkol Borey District in Banteay Meanchey Province in northwestern Cambodia. It flows from the border of Chanthaburi Province of Thailand and runs through Mongkol Borey and neighboring districts. It is a major tributary of the Tonlé Sap.
