= Tuek Thla, Banteay Meanchey =

Tuek Thla ឃុំទឹកថ្លា
- Commune
- Interactive map of Tuek Thla
- Country: Cambodia
- Province: Banteay Meanchey
- District: Serei Saophoan District
- Villages: 6
- Time zone: UTC+07

Tuek Thla is a khum (commune) of Serei Saophoan District in Banteay Meanchey Province in north-western Cambodia.

== Villages ==
- Ba Nay(បាណយ)
- Dei Lou(ដីឡូ)
- Keab(កៀប)
- Phnum Bak(ភ្នំបាក់)
- Tuek Thla(ទឹកថ្លា)
- Tumnob Chrey(ទំនប់ជ្រៃ)
