= Ou Chrov district =

Ou Chrov ស្រុកអូរជ្រៅ
- District (srok)
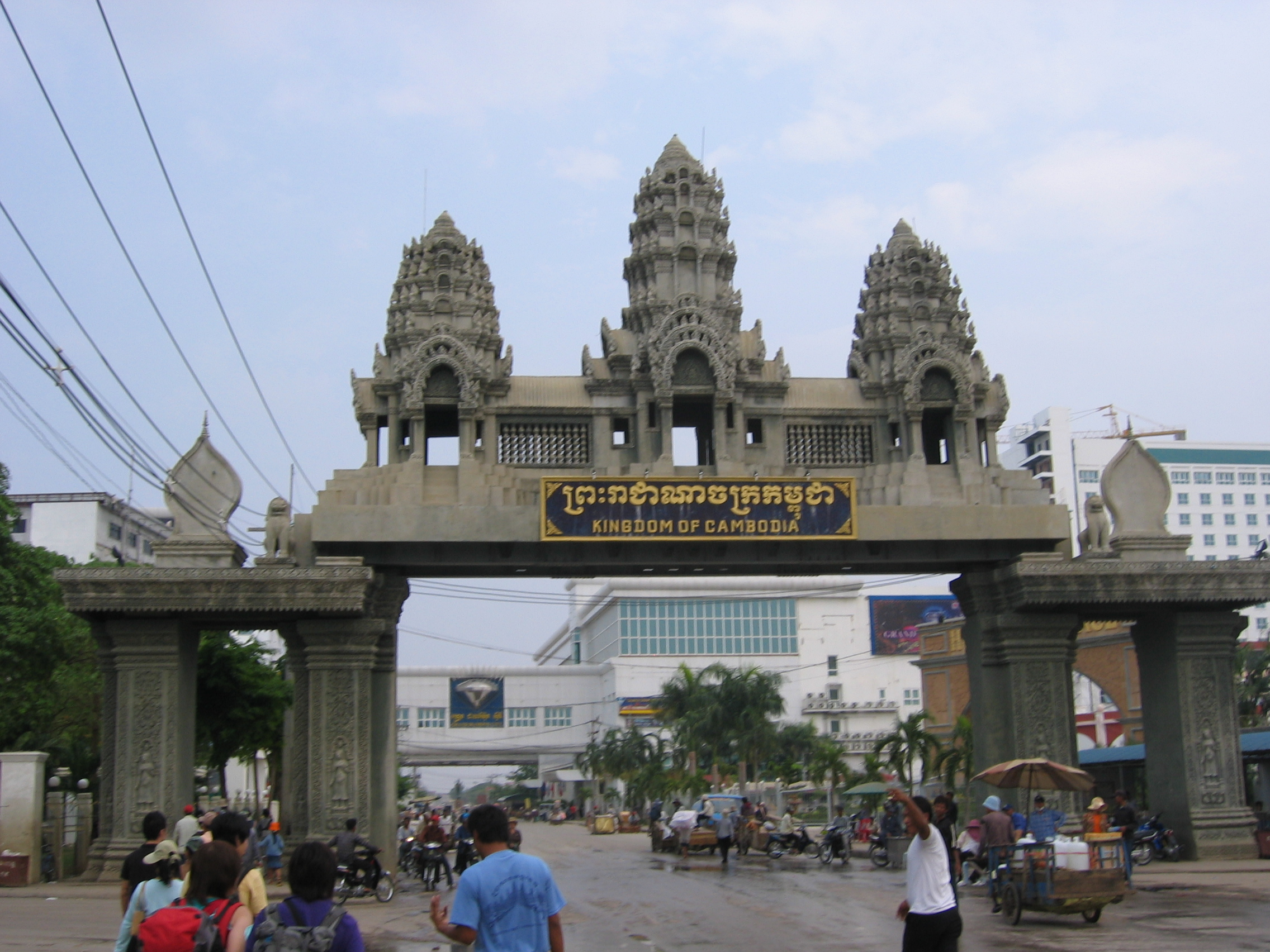
- The Thai Cambodian border crossing at Poipet

- Map showing the location of the district within Banteay Meanchey Province.

- Location in Cambodia
- Coordinates: 13°39′N 102°34′E
- Country: Cambodia
- Province: Banteay Meanchey
- Communes: 7
- Villages: 49

Population (2008 census)
  - Total: 47,196
- Time zone: +7
- Geocode: 0105

Ou Chrov (Khmer: ស្រុកអូរជ្រៅ, lit. 'The Deep Ditch') is a district (srok) in the west of Banteay Meanchey province in north-western Cambodia. The border town of Poipet is located within the district. Poipet is the district capital and is located around 48.5 kilometres due west of the provincial capital of Sisophon by road. Ou Chrov district is one of the westernmost districts of Banteay Meanchey. The district borders on Thailand and Poipet contains a popular international border crossing which is home to numerous casinos.

The district can be accessed by road from Sisophon (48 km) and Bangkok (230 km). Ou Chrov district is similar in size to other Banteay Meanchey districts however it has a larger population due to its border crossing and related industry.

National Highway 5 runs east to west across the district and ends in Phnom Penh. Although there is only one official border crossing in the district, numerous smaller roads in the district also run to various locations on the border.

== Administration ==
The Ou Chrov District governor reports to Oung Ouen, the Governor of Banteay Meanchey. The following table shows the villages of Ou Chrov district by commune.

Khum (communes)	Phum (villages)
Changha	Boeng Seila, Ta Chrueng, Ta Phaok, Paoy Voat, Chhuk, Chrey
Koub	Yeang thmei, Mak Heun, Veang Muong, Koub Kaeut, Khai Dan, Naka Chhay, Koub Lech, Koub Cheung, Ou Chrov, Souriya, Koun Trei
Kuttasat	Koub Touch, Kaoh Char, Kuttaksat, Yeay Ort
Samraong	Banlech, Neak Ta Chhor, Samraong, Kampong Reab, Thmei, Thmenh Trei, Bat Trang, Anhchanh, Voat, Kandal
Souphi	Souphi Cheung, Souphi Kandal, Souphi Tboung, Kouk Chak, Kouk Prich Chak Thmey
Soengh	Soeng Lech, Roka, Anlong Svay, Soeng Tboung, Phkoam, Pongro, Tnaot Kandal, Run
Ou Beichaon	Banteay Thmei, Chouk Chey, Ou Bei Choan, Prasat, Prey Chan, Preav, Seila Khmaer, Snuol Tret, Thnal Bat, Tumnob Dach, Yeang Dangkum

== Demography ==
The district is subdivided into 7 communes (khum) and 49 villages (phum).
