= Poipet =

City in Banteay Meanchey, Cambodia

Poipet ប៉ោយប៉ែត
- City
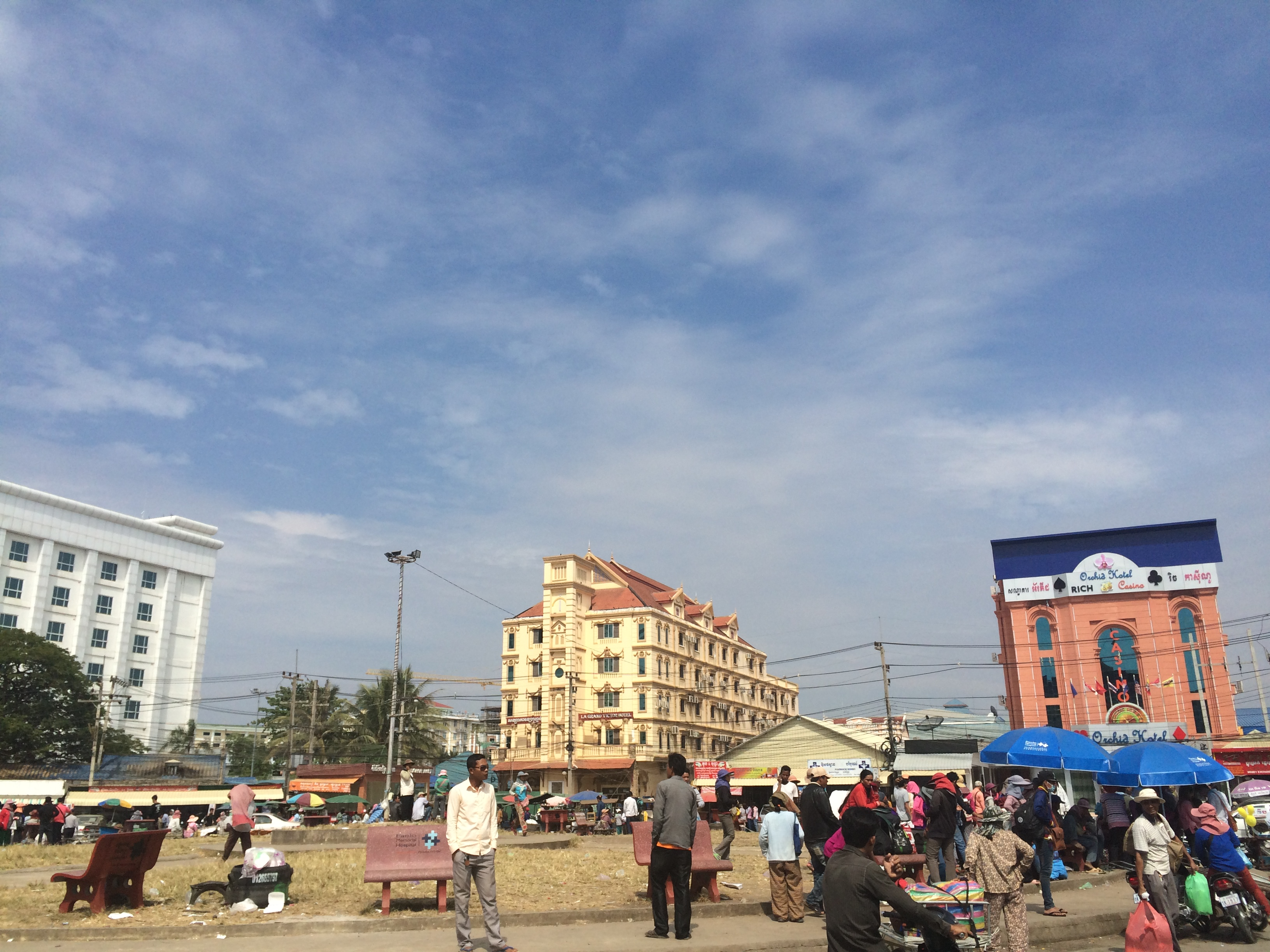
- Poipet in 2015

- Location within Cambodia
- Coordinates: 13°39′N 102°34′E
- Country: Cambodia
- Province: Banteay Meanchey
- Municipality: Poipet

Population (2019)
  - Total: 98,934
  - Density: 3,614/km^{2} (9,360/sq mi)
- Time zone: UTC+07:00 (ICT)

Poipet

Khmer name
- Khmer: ប៉ោយប៉ែត UNGEGN: Paôypêt; GD: Paoypaet; ALA-LC: P″oip″aet; IPA: [paojpaet]

Poipet (Khmer: ប៉ោយប៉ែត [paojpaet]) is a city in Poipet Municipality, Banteay Meanchey province, Cambodia near the border with Thailand, serving as a key crossing point between the two countries.

Poipet is adjacent to the town of Aranyaprathet on the Thai side of the border. The city came into existence only quite recently for the express purpose of border trade; Sisophon had always been the primary urban center in what had been an agricultural area. Poipet's population has increased from 43,366 in the 1998 census to 89,549 in the 2008 census, making it the fourth most populous settlement in Cambodia just ahead of Sihanoukville and larger than its provincial capital Sisophon. During the Khmer Rouge regime, Poipet was the first place in Cambodia for International Relief Organisations to support the nearby Thai Border Camps. The United Nations staff were able to freely cross the border. In the years since 2008, Poipet has continued to boom both as a large town but also as a key gateway from and to Thailand. In addition to its border-casino economy, Poipet has been cited in reporting on guarded compounds linked to online scam operations and trafficking; see Scam centers in Cambodia.

== Transport ==
The Poipet border is a terminus of the Cambodia railway system, though in 2006 restoring a link from Poipet to the present Cambodian Railways railhead at Sisophon was proposed. In the fall of 2008, an agreement was prepared to have an Australian company carry out this work. In 2009, Thailand passed legislation to extend the railway from Aranyaprathet to Poipet, and in 2018 the railway line was reactivated.

On 22 December 2022, Prime Minister Hun Sen said that the government has been conducting studies on high-speed railways connecting domestically and to neighbouring countries. "We are conducting studies on high-speed railways connecting Phnom Penh to Preah Sihanouk province and to the border with Thailand."

== Demography ==
Poipet is a city famous for its gambling and casino center in Cambodia. This attracts many foreigners. The largest number of foreigners are Indonesians, most of whom work in casinos and as online gambling admins. Indonesian restaurants and food stalls are easy to find. Chinese (8,000 people) and Thai citizens can also be found here.

== Casinos in the city ==
There is a strip of casinos and hotels between the Cambodian and Thai passport control counters, enabling Thais and other foreigners to gamble in Cambodia without needing to go through Cambodian immigration. In Cambodia, gambling is illegal for Cambodian citizens but not for holders of foreign passports. There is another border on the Cambodian side of this strip area that one needs to pass before being free to travel within the rest of the country.

On 28 December 2022, a fire at the Grand Diamond City Hotel and Casino killed 27 people and injured dozens of others.

== Gallery ==
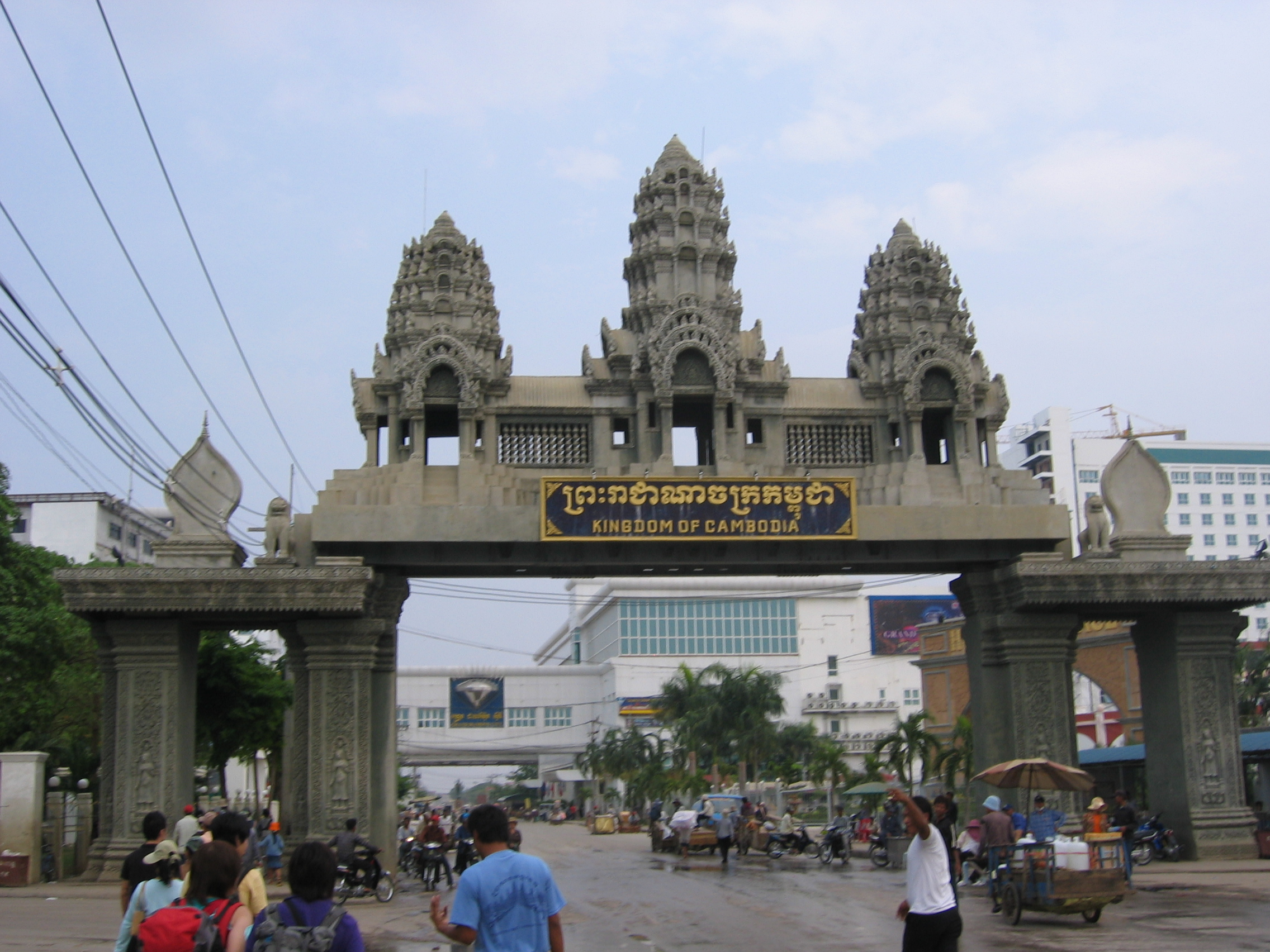
Poipet border crossing into Cambodia

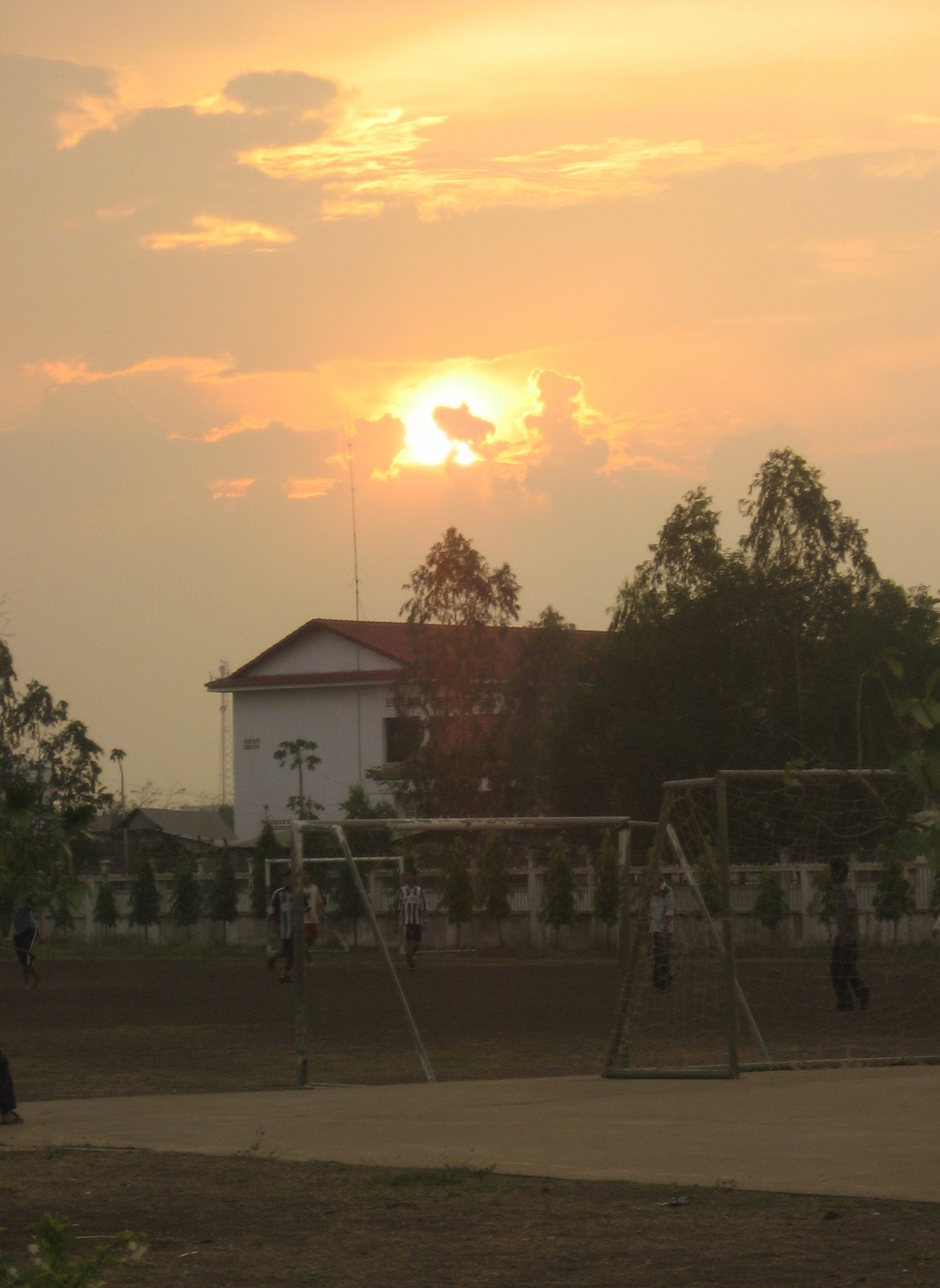
Poipet during sunset

Casino and street scape
