= Oung Ouen =

Cambodian politician

Governor of Banteay Meanchey

Oung Ouen is a Cambodian politician and former governor of Banteay Meanchey province, Cambodia.

In 2008 he expressed concerns about Thai deployments along 150 kilometers of his border, west of Preah Vihear, the initial site of a military standoff that began on July 15.
