= Serei Saophoan (city) =

City in Banteay Meanchey, Cambodia

Serei Saophoan សិរីសោភ័ណ Sisophon
- City
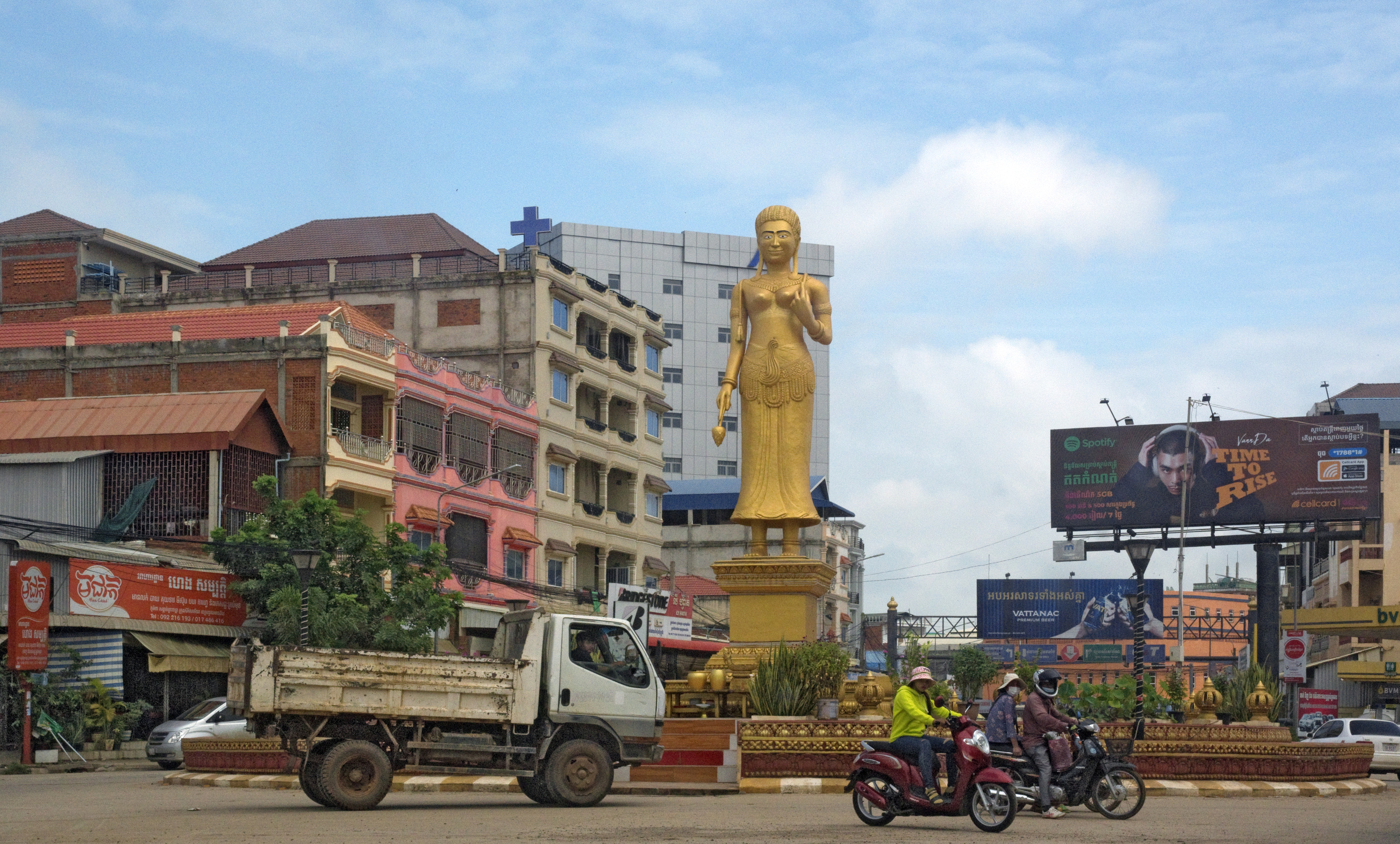
- Roundabout in the centre of Serei Saophoan (September 2022)

- Location within Cambodia
- Coordinates: 13°35′02″N 102°58′25″E
- Country: Cambodia
- Province: Banteay Meanchey
- Municipality: Serei Saophoan

Government
  - Mayor: Hil Raya
- Elevation: 15 m (49 ft)

Population (2019)
  - Total: 99,019
  - Rank: 4th
- Time zone: UTC+07:00 (ICT)

Serei Saophoan (Khmer: សិរីសោភ័ណ [serəj saopʰɔən]) is the capital and largest city of the Banteay Meanchey Province and the fourth most populous city in Cambodia. The city separates Cambodia's National Highway 5 and National Highway 6. Its administrative name is "Serei Sophon" as used by the government. The more commonly used name Sisophon is derived from the Thai pronunciation Si Sophon when it was under Thai rule. Another nickname, "Svay", is used mainly by truck drivers, train drivers and workers transporting goods. The origin of the word "Svay" is unknown.

Its population was 61,482 in the 1998 census, changing little to 61,631 in the 2008 census having been overtaken by Poipet in size.

About forty minutes from Sisophon there is a Khmer Angkor temple ruin called Banteay Chmar which was built during the reign of Jayavarman VII in the late 12th to early 13th century.

== Name ==
The name "Sisophon" is of Thai origin, derived from Sanskrit "Śrī Śobhana", with "śobhana" literally meaning "beautiful", "bright", or "glorious". Before the Thais renamed it, it was a village known as "Phum Svay", meaning "village of mango trees", or "Phum Ta Svay", meaning "village of Grandfather Svay" (since "Svāy", meaning "mango tree", is a common given name in the countryside). The old name still survives in a hybrid form "Svay-Sisophon" used locally, as well as in the name of a nearby hill called Phnom Svay.

== Climate ==
Climate data for Serei Saophoan (1982–2024)
Month	Jan	Feb	Mar	Apr	May	Jun	Jul	Aug	Sep	Oct	Nov	Dec	Year
Mean daily maximum °C (°F)	31.5 (88.7)	33.0 (91.4)	35.7 (96.3)	35.9 (96.6)	36.0 (96.8)	33.3 (91.9)	33.8 (92.8)	32.1 (89.8)	32.5 (90.5)	32.9 (91.2)	31.5 (88.7)	30.2 (86.4)	33.2 (91.8)
Mean daily minimum °C (°F)	21.0 (69.8)	21.5 (70.7)	22.7 (72.9)	25.4 (77.7)	25.8 (78.4)	24.2 (75.6)	23.4 (74.1)	24.0 (75.2)	23.7 (74.7)	23.1 (73.6)	22.4 (72.3)	20.0 (68.0)	23.1 (73.6)
Average precipitation mm (inches)	6.4 (0.25)	13.2 (0.52)	56.4 (2.22)	79.3 (3.12)	249.4 (9.82)	264.3 (10.41)	270.0 (10.63)	304.9 (12.00)	426.7 (16.80)	327.5 (12.89)	103.6 (4.08)	10.2 (0.40)	2,111.9 (83.14)
Source: World Meteorological Organization

== Notable people ==
- Ted Ngoy, the "Donut King"

== See also ==
- Sisophon Province
- Banteay Chhmar
