= Time in Cambodia =

Cambodia follows UTC+07:00, which is 7 hours ahead of UTC. The local mean time in Phnom Penh was originally UTC+6:54. Cambodia used this local mean time until 1920, when it changed to Indochina Time, UTC+07:00; ICT is used all year round as Cambodia does not observe daylight saving time. Cambodia shares the same time zone with Russia (Krasnoyarsk Time), Western Indonesia, Thailand, Laos, Vietnam, and Christmas Island.

== See also ==
- List of time zones
- ASEAN Common Time
- Six-hour clock
- Buddhist Era
