= Banteay Meanchey province =

Province of Cambodia

Banteay Meanchey Province ខេត្តបន្ទាយមានជ័យ
- Province

Khmer transcription(s)
  - Khmer: ខេត្តបន្ទាយមានជ័យ
  - UNGEGN: Khaet Bǎntiay Mian Chĕi
  - ALA-LC: Khett Pantāy Mān Jăy
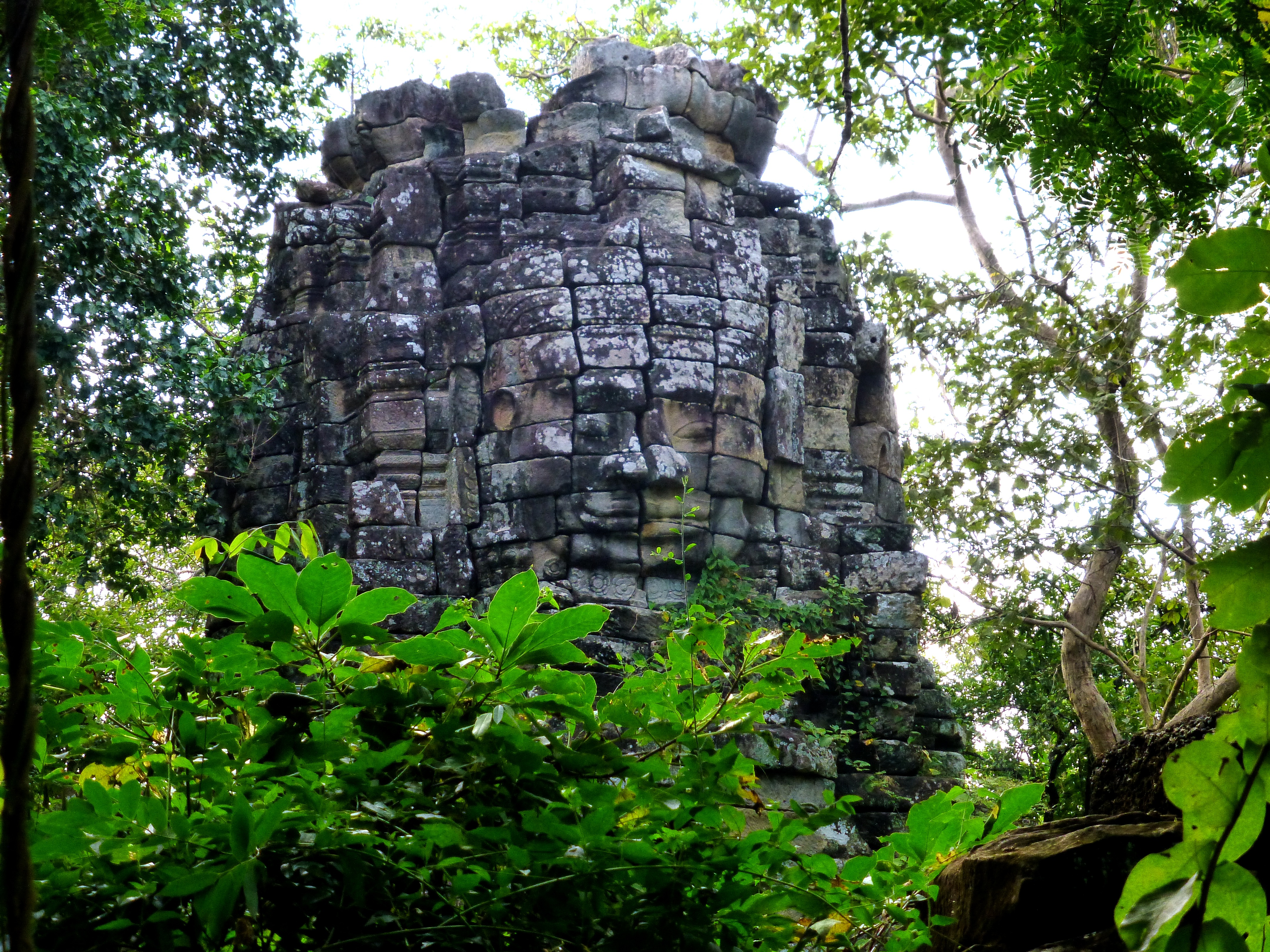
- Banteay Chhmar Temple

- Seal

- Map of Cambodia highlighting Banteay Meanchey
- Coordinates: 13°45′N 103°00′E
- Country: Cambodia
- Provincial status: 1993
- Capital: Serei Saophoan and Poi Pet
- Subdivisions: 2 municipalities; 7 districts

Government
  - Governor: Oum Reatrey (CPP)
  - Deputy Governor: Ly Sari
  - National Assembly: 6 / 125

Area
  - Total: 6,679 km^{2} (2,579 sq mi)
  - Rank: 12th

Population (2024 census)
  - Total: ▼898,484
  - Rank: 9th
  - Density: 129/km^{2} (330/sq mi)
  - Rank: 9th
- Time zone: UTC+07:00 (ICT)
- Dialing code: +855
- ISO 3166 code: KH-1

Banteay Meanchey Province (Khmer: ខេត្តបន្ទាយមានជ័យ, Khaet Bǎntiay Mian Chĕi, [ɓɑn.tiəj miən cej]; lit. 'victorious fortress') is a province of Cambodia located in the far northwest. It borders Oddar Meanchey Province to the north, Siem Reap Province to the east, Battambang Province to the south, and shares an international border with Thailand to the west. Its capital and largest city is Serei Saophoan.

Banteay Meanchey is the 13th largest province in Cambodia. With a population of 861,883, it ranks as the ninth most populous in the nation. The city of Poipet in the western part of the province is an international border crossing into Thailand. Banteay Meanchey is one of the nine provinces that are part of the Tonlé Sap Biosphere Reserve.

== Etymology ==
Banteay Meanchey means lit. 'victorious fortress' in Khmer. The word chey (ជ័យ, chei) is derived from the Sanskrit word jaya (जय) meaning "victory" or “power while mean (មាន, miən) means ''to have'', so the combination of both literally means ''to have victory'' and banteay (បន្ទាយ, bǎntiəi) is a Khmer word meaning "fortress" or "castle".

== History ==
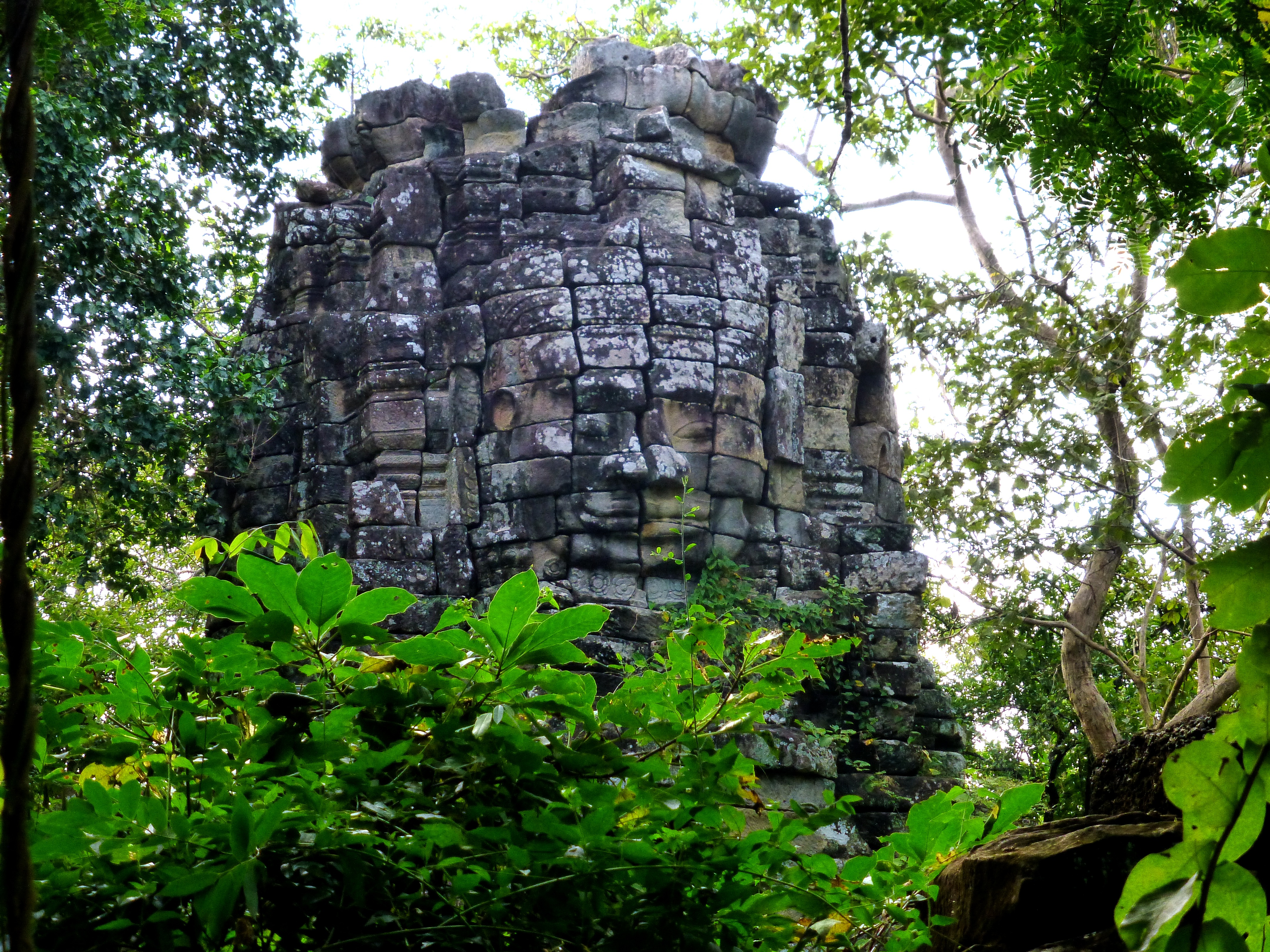
Ruins of Banteay Chhmar Temple

In 1988 the province Banteay Meanchey was split off from Battambang, originally consisting of the five districts Mongkol Borei, Thmar Puok, Serei Saophoan, Preah Net Preah and Phnom Srok.

During the Cambodian Civil Wars of the 1970s and 1980s Banteay Meanchey province was on the frontlines of much of fighting and as a result it is one of the three most heavily mined provinces in Cambodia along with Pailin and Battambang.

== Economy ==
=== Poipet International Border Checkpoint ===
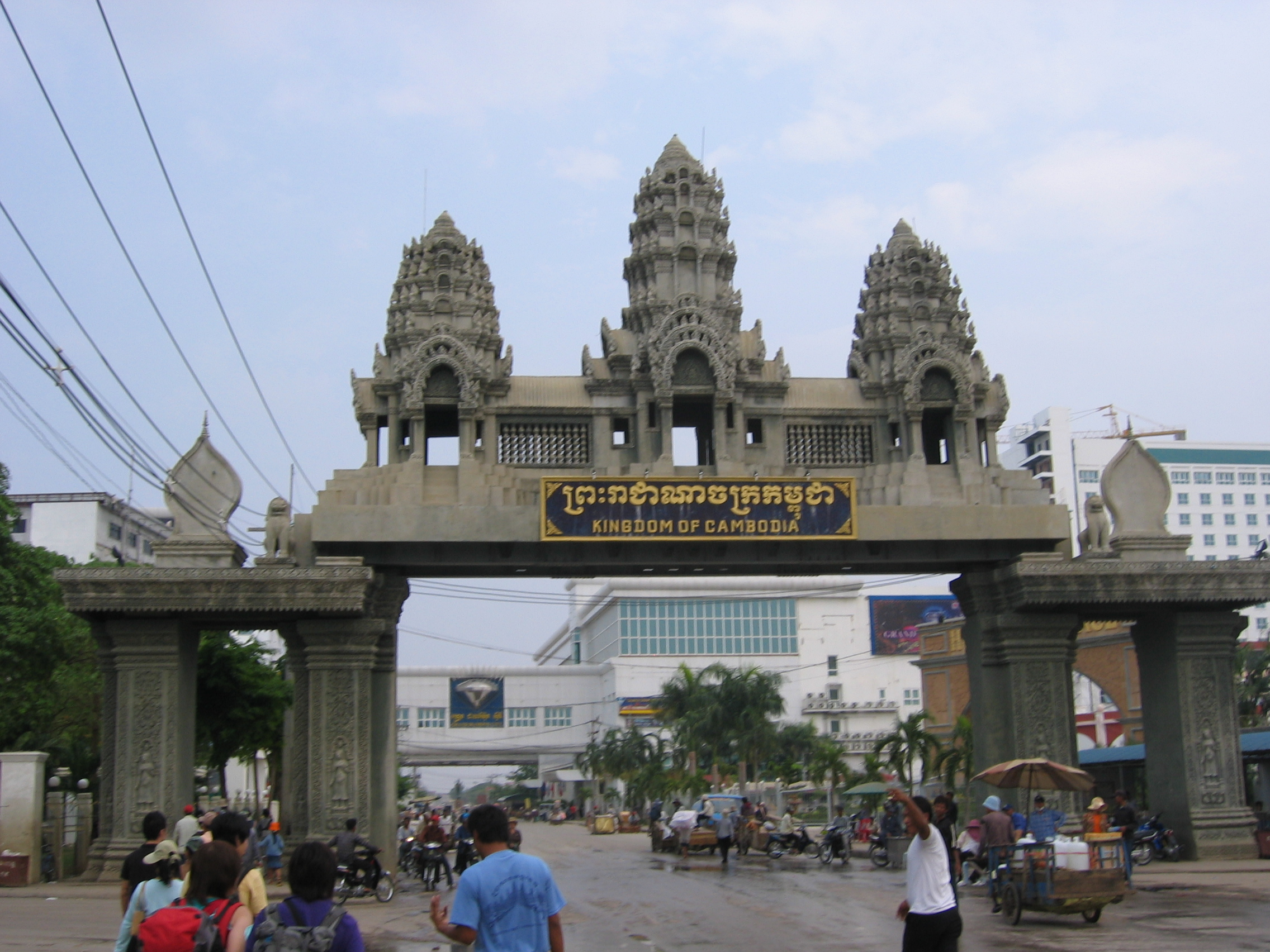
Poipet International Border Checkpoint

Banteay Meanchey has one of Cambodia's busiest checkpoints, Poipet International Border Checkpoint, for both people and goods. The checkpoint oversees approximately 2,000 tourists (50,000 tourists or 14% of nation's tourists annually in 2015) and 300 trucks carrying goods every day. In response to the increase of trade between Cambodia and Thailand, a new border checkpoint, Stueng Bot which is only 7 km from Poipet Checkpoint, is being constructed and slated to be completed by 2018. The new checkpoint will focus on trade while leaving Poipet Checkpoint for tourists.

=== Special Economic Zone (SEZ) and Industry ===
O'Neang Special Economic Zone was officially approved in 2006. In 2014, the zone hosted 5 factories includings CAMPAC Co. Ltd, a Thai company which produces package for jewellery, Hi-Tech Apparel (Cambodia) Co., Ltd., ML Intermate Apparel (Cambodia) Co., Ltd., SIMMER Inter Co., Ltd., and Wireform Precision Parts Co., Ltd. O'Neang employed 1,200 workers. In recent years, Japanese and Cambodian investors jointly established a new Special Economic Zone, Sanco. The 66.5 hectare zone has already attracted NHK Spring, a Japanese car-seat manufacturer and Toyota supplier. In March 2015, Toyota Tsusho Corporation (Toyota Tsusho) announced that it will establish Techno Park Poipet Pvt. Co., Ltd. to optimize its regional supply chains. The park will provide subcontracted auto part service and plans to service 10 or more companies by 2020. Thanks to its cheap labour cost, cheaper and stable electricity supply from Thailand ($0.16 per kilowatt), its proximity to Bangkok and favorable investment policy, Poipet is seen as a future industrial city of the Northwestern part of Cambodia.

=== Transportation ===
Banteay Meanchey sits on a strategic cross point that directs to Thailand, Siem Reap (Angkor Wat) and Battambang (gateway to Phnom Penh and Vietnam). As of 2018, infrastructure such as national roads, provincial roads and railway have been improved significantly. The historical re-operation of Royal Railway that links Thailand to Phnom Penh and Cambodia's seaport city started in April 2018. In this first phase, people can travel by train from Poi Pet to Sereisophorn and Battambang. Links from Battambang to Pursat, Kampong Chhnang and Phnom Penh will soon be completed. The national road number 5 is being upgraded to meet international standard. The project is funded by Japanese government in a broader plan to connect Thailand, Cambodia, and Vietnam.

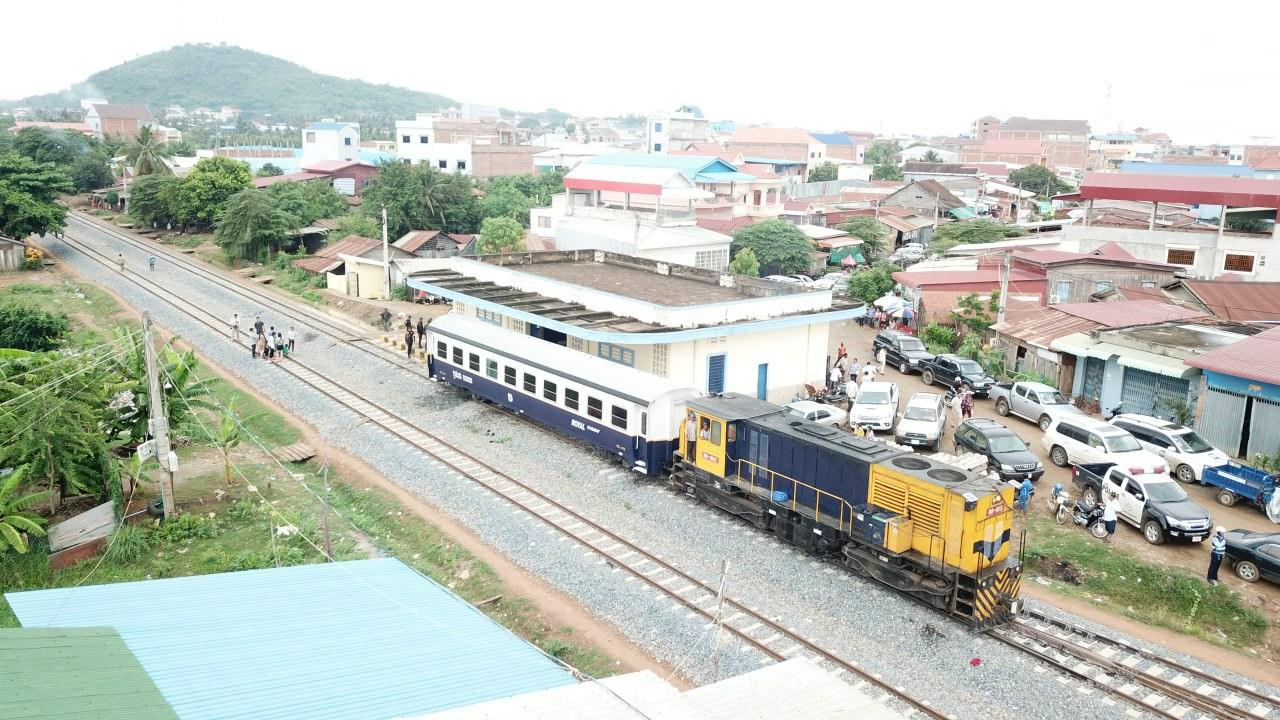
A train station, Serei Saophoan (CC: MTPW)

== Administration ==
The province is subdivided into 7 districts (srok) and 2 municipalities (krong), which are further subdivided into 55 communes (khum) and 10 quarters (sangkat), and 654 villages (phum).

ISO code	Name	Khmer	Population (2019)	Subdivisions
— Municipality —
01-06	Serei Saophoan	សិរីសោភ័ណ	99,019	7 sangkat
01-10	Poipet	ប៉ោយប៉ែត	98,934	3 sangkat
— District —
01-02	Mongkol Borey	មង្គលបូរី	187,286	13 khum
01-03	Phnom Srok	ភ្នំស្រុក	65,945	6 khum
01-04	Preah Netr Preah	ព្រះនេត្រព្រះ	124,902	9 khum
01-05	Ou Chrov	អូរជ្រៅ	63,413	7 khum
01-07	Thma Puok	ថ្មពួក	76,926	6 khum
01-08	Svay Chek	ស្វាយចេក	81,106	8 khum
01-09	Malai	ម៉ាឡៃ	55,721	6 khum

== People ==
- Khim Bora, Cambodian boxer
- Khim Dima, Cambodian boxer
- Sok Thy, Cambodian boxer
