= Kampong Tralach district =

Kampong Tralach ស្រុកកំពង់ត្រឡាច
- District (srok)
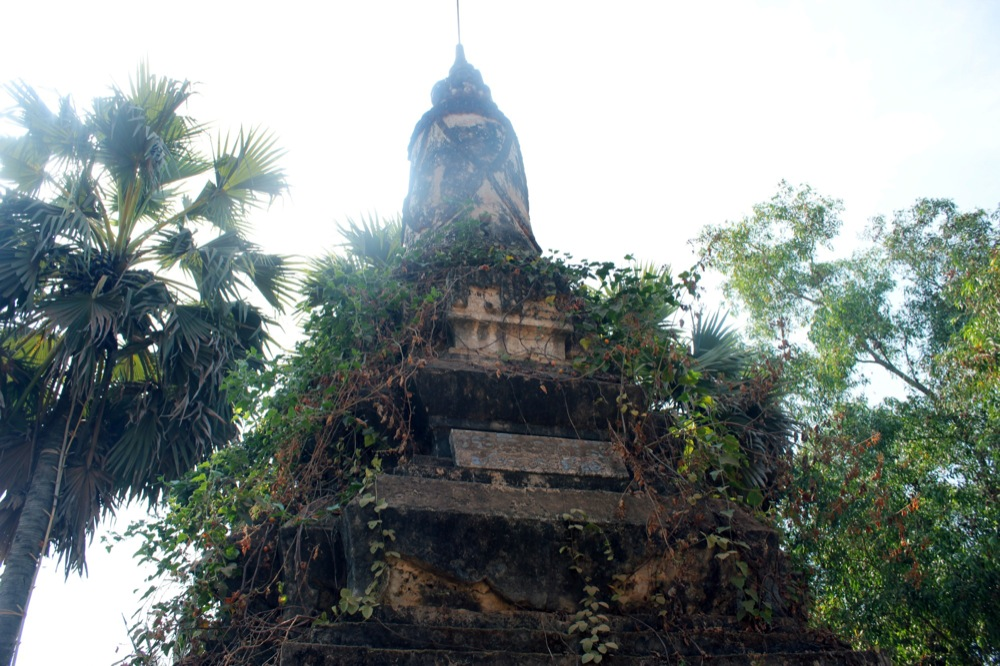

- Location in Cambodia
- Coordinates: 11°56′N 104°43′E
- Country: Cambodia
- Province: Kampong Chhnang
- Communes: 10
- Villages: 103

Population (1998)
  - Total: 74,541
- Time zone: +7
- Geocode: 0405

Kampong Tralach (Khmer: ស្រុកកំពង់ត្រឡាច "Port of the Winter Melon") is a district (srok) in the south east of Kampong Chhnang province, in central Cambodia. The district capital is Kampong Tralach town located 37 kilometres south of the provincial capital of Kampong Chhnang by road. The district shares a border with Kandal province to the south and Kampong Cham province to the east. The Tonlé Sap River runs through the district crossing roughly from north to south.

The district has significant road infrastructure and National Highway 5 which runs from Phnom Penh to Poipet crosses the district from north to south. Kampong Tralach district is one of the smaller districts in Kampong Chhnang province by land area but has one of the largest district populations in the province due to well irrigated land and good transport infrastructure. National Road 138 starts at Kampong Tralach and runs across the district to its terminus at Chleb in Tuek Phos district. Numerous smaller tertiary roads run either to the nearby national railway line or to the Tonle Sap.

Kampong Tralech hosts the main center of the Kan Imam San religious community, a type of Islam practiced exclusively by some Chams in isolated communities in Cambodia.

It is also the location of two historical Buddhist pagodas, Wat Kampong Tralach Krom and Wat Kampong Tralach Leu.

== Ancient capital ==
Kampong Tralach is the site of the former capital of Cambodia at Longvek. Longvek was Cambodia's main city after the Siamese King Borommaracha II sacked Angkor in 1431. The new capital was located on the banks of the Tonle Sap river, halfway between Phnom Penh and the lower end of the Tonle Sap lake. This new site was chosen to be more defensible than Angkor. The city became a wealthy trading centre and attracted various Europeans traders and missionaries through the 16th and 17th centuries.

== Location ==
Kampong Tralach district lies in the south east of the province and shares a border with Kandal and Kampong Cham provinces. Reading from the north clockwise, Kampong Tralach borders with Rolea B'ier district to the north and Chol Kiri district to the north west. The eastern border of the district is shared with Batheay district of Kampong Cham province. To the south the district shares a border with Ponhea Leu district of Kandal province. The western border of the district joins with Sameakki Mean Chey and Tuek Phos districts of Kampong Chhnang.

== Administration ==
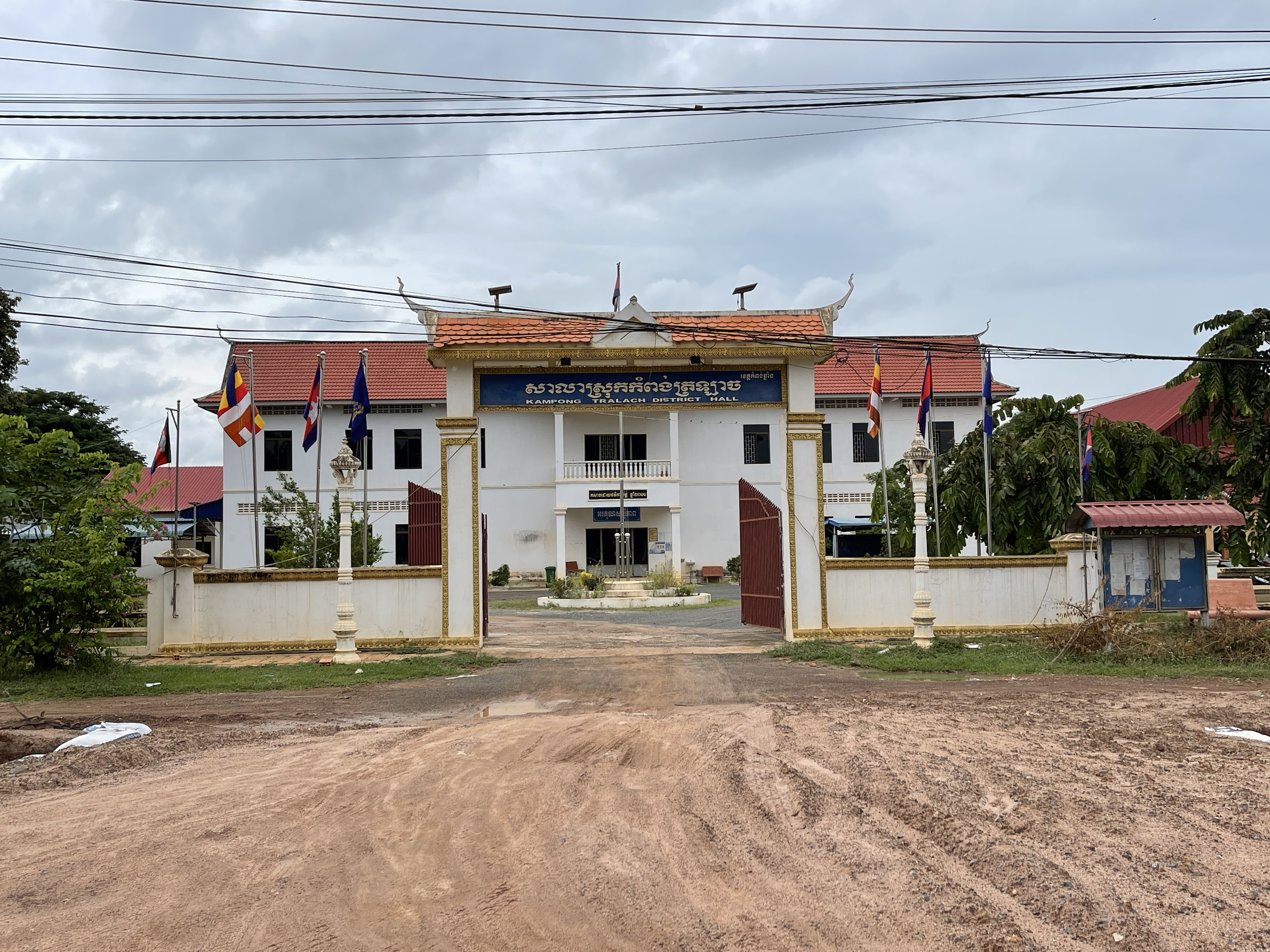
Kampong Tralach District Hall

The district is subdivided into 10 communes (khum) and 103 villages (phum). The Kampong Tralach district governor reports to Touch Marim, the Governor of Kampong Chhnang. The following table shows the villages of Kampong Tralach district by commune.

Khum (communes)	Phum (villages)
Ampil Tuek	Stueng Snguot, Kien Khleang, Veal Sbov, K'aek Pong, Ampil Tuek, Baek Chan, Ou Mal, Bak Phnum, Kbal Kaoh, Khla Krohuem, Sdei Banlich
Chhuk Sa	Andoung Tramung, Chrak Romiet, Prey Pis, Prey Pear, Sna Pech, Chhuk Kranhas, Krasah Thmei, Trapeang Chrov, Trapeang Khtum, Tuol, Ou Rung, Sdok Lech, Srae Sar, Chrolong Kaisna
Chres	Trapeang Pnov, Serei Chhaom, Veal Lvieng, Ou, Chumteav Sokh, Saray Andaet, Kanhchroung, Prey Pis, Kbal Damrei, Prab Phcheah, Chramoh Chruk, Chak, Dak Snet, Chumteav
Kampong Tralach	Kampong Tralach Leu, Kampong Tralach Kraom, Neak Ta Hang, Samretthi Chey, Preaek Kanlang, Kampong Kdar, Kien Roka
Longveaek	Oknha Pang, Trapeang Chambak, Phsar Trach, Anlong Tnaot, Srah Chak, Voat, Trapeang Samraong, Boeng Kak
Ou Ruessei	Chrak Romiet, Sala Lekh Pram, Ou Ruessei, Srae Prei, Chan Kiek, Kralanh, Thnong, Leach
Peani	Ta At, Soben, Ta Kol, Stueng, Prey Sak, Peani, Kok, Tuol Serei, Krang Ta Aek
Saeb	Khnay Kakaoh, Tuek L'ak, Kbal Thnal, Ta Sokh, Ta Sou, Doun Toy, Ta Nob, Chambak Ph'aem, Kralanh, Kampong Prasat, Pravoek Pong, Khnay Kakaoh Thmei
Ta Ches	Boeng Kak, La Peang, Ou Rung, Samraong, Svay Krom, Souvong, Snay, Svay Bakav, Voat Thmei, Thlok Yol, Ta Kaoh, Trapeang Preal, Banteay Meas, sampoar, Kampong Ta Ches
Thma Edth	Daeum Popel, Snang Mum, Thma Edth, Ko, Trapeang Kdar

== Demographics ==
According to the 1998 Census, the population of the district was 74,541 persons in 14,422 households in 1998. This population consisted of 35,460 males (47.6%) and 39,081 females (52.4%). With a population of over 70,000 people, Kampong Tralach has one of the largest district populations in Kampong Chhnang province, only Rolea B'ier is larger. The average household size in Kampong Tralach is 5.2 persons per household, which is exactly the rural average for Cambodia. The sex ratio in the district is 90.7%, with significantly more females than males.
