= Kampong Chhnang Municipality =

Kampong Chhnang municipality ស្រុកកំពង់ឆ្នាំង
- Municipality
- Location in Cambodia
- Coordinates: 12°15′N 104°40′E
- Country: Cambodia
- Province: Kampong Chhnang
- Communes: 4
- Villages: 26
- Capital: Kampong Chhnang

Government
  - Mayor: Hay Monorom

Population (2008)
  - Total: 43,130
- Time zone: +7
- Geocode: 0403

Kampong Chhnang municipality (Khmer: ស្រុកកំពង់ឆ្នាំង) is a municipality in the centre of Kampong Chhnang province in central Cambodia. This is classed as an urban district and the provincial capital Kampong Chhnang City lies within the municipality. The district is quite small and encompasses the provincial town and nearby communes. Kampong Chhnang is the smallest district in Kampong Chhnang province and is surrounded by other Kampong Chhnang districts. The Tonle Sap river lies on the north and eastern borders of the district.

The district is a significant transportation hub for both road and water transport. Kampong Chhnang is the smallest district in Kampong Chhnang province by land area but is densely populated. National Highway 5 which runs from Phnom Penh to Poipet in Banteay Meanchey enters the district in the south and exits to the north west. National Road 53 begins here and runs south west to meet the National Railway line at Romeas in Tuek Phos district. Numerous smaller provincial roads begin in the centre of the district. One of these runs north east for 2 kilometres to Kampong Chhnang Port in Phsar Chhnang commune.

== Location ==
Kampong Chhnang district lies in the centre of the province and is surrounded by other Kampong Chhnang districts. Reading from the north clockwise, Kampong Chhnang borders with Kampong Leang district to the north and north east. The south eastern border of the district is shared with Chol Kiri district. At this point the Tonle Sap river has three arms. The southern arm is located within the district and the middle arm is part of the district to midstream. To the south and the west the district shares a border with Rola B'ier District.

== Administration ==
The district is subdivided into 4 communes (khum) and 26 villages (phum). The Kampong Chhnang district governor reports to Touch Marim, the Governor of Kampong Chhnang. The following table shows the villages of Kampong Chhnang district by commune.

Khum (Communes)	Phum (Villages)
Phsar Chhnang	Phsar Leu, Phsar Chhnang, Chong Kaoh, Samraong, Kaoh Krabei, Trapeang Bei, Kampong Ous, Kandal
Kampong Chhnang	Srae Pring, Damnak Popul, La Tuek Trei, Kandal, Trapeang Choek Sa, Tuol Kralanh
Ph'er	B'er, Thommeak Yutt, Mong Barang, Khleang Prak
Khsam	Ti Muoy, Ti Pir, Ti Bei, Ti Buon, Ti Pram, Ti Prammuoy, Ti Prampir, Ti Prambei

== Demographics ==
According to the 1998 Census, the population of the district was 41,703 persons in 7,692 households in 1998. This population consisted of 20,133 males (48.3%) and 21,570 females (51.7%). With a population of over 40,000 people, Kampong Chhnang has an average district population for Kampong Chhnang province. The average household size in Kampong Chhnang is 5.4 persons per household, which is slightly smaller than the urban average for Cambodia (5.5 persons). The sex ratio in the district is 93.3%, with significantly more females than males.
