= Kampong Chhnang =

Kampong Chhnang can refer to these places in Cambodia:

- Kampong Chhnang (city)
- Kampong Chhnang province
- Kampong Chhnang municipality
- Kampong Chhnang commune
- Kampong Chhnang Airport
