= Ampil Tuk =

- Village
- Location within Cambodia
- Coordinates: 11°59′N 104°49′E
- Country: Cambodia
- Province: Kampong Chhnang Province
- District: Kampong Chhnang District

Ampil Tuk is a village on the Tonle Sap River in Kampong Chhnang Province, Cambodia. It lies to the southeast of Kampong Chhnang City and northeast of Oudoum. The village shape is narrow and largely confined to the banks of the river. Ampil Tuk was bombed 8 times in 1973, twice by B-52s, four times by jets and twice by Lon Nol's T-28s. Ampil Tuk is probably best known for its eight-armed Maitreya bronze statue from Wat Ampil Tuk.
