= Tuek =

Tuek may refer to:

== Locations ==
- Tuek Chhou district, a district located in Kampot province, in southern Cambodia
- Tuek Chhu Falls, a waterfall in Kampot Province, Cambodia
- Tuek Chour, a commune of Preah Netr Preah District in Banteay Meanchey Province in north-western Cambodia
- Tuek Phos district, a district located in the west of Kampong Chhnang province, in central Cambodia
  - Tuek Phos (town), a small town and capital of Tuek Phos district in Kampong Chhnang Province, Cambodia
- Tuek Thla, Banteay Meanchey, a commune of Serei Saophoan District in Banteay Meanchey Province in north-western Cambodia
- Tuek Thla, Phnom Penh, a quarter of Khan Sen Sok in Phnom Penh, Cambodia

== Fictional characters ==
- Esmar Tuek, a character in the 1965 Frank Herbert novel Dune
- Staban Tuek, Esmar's son in Dune
- Hedley Tuek, Esmar's descendant in the 1984 Frank Herbert novel Heretics of Dune
