= Rolea B'ier district =

Rolea B'ier ស្រុករលាប្អៀរ
- District (srok)
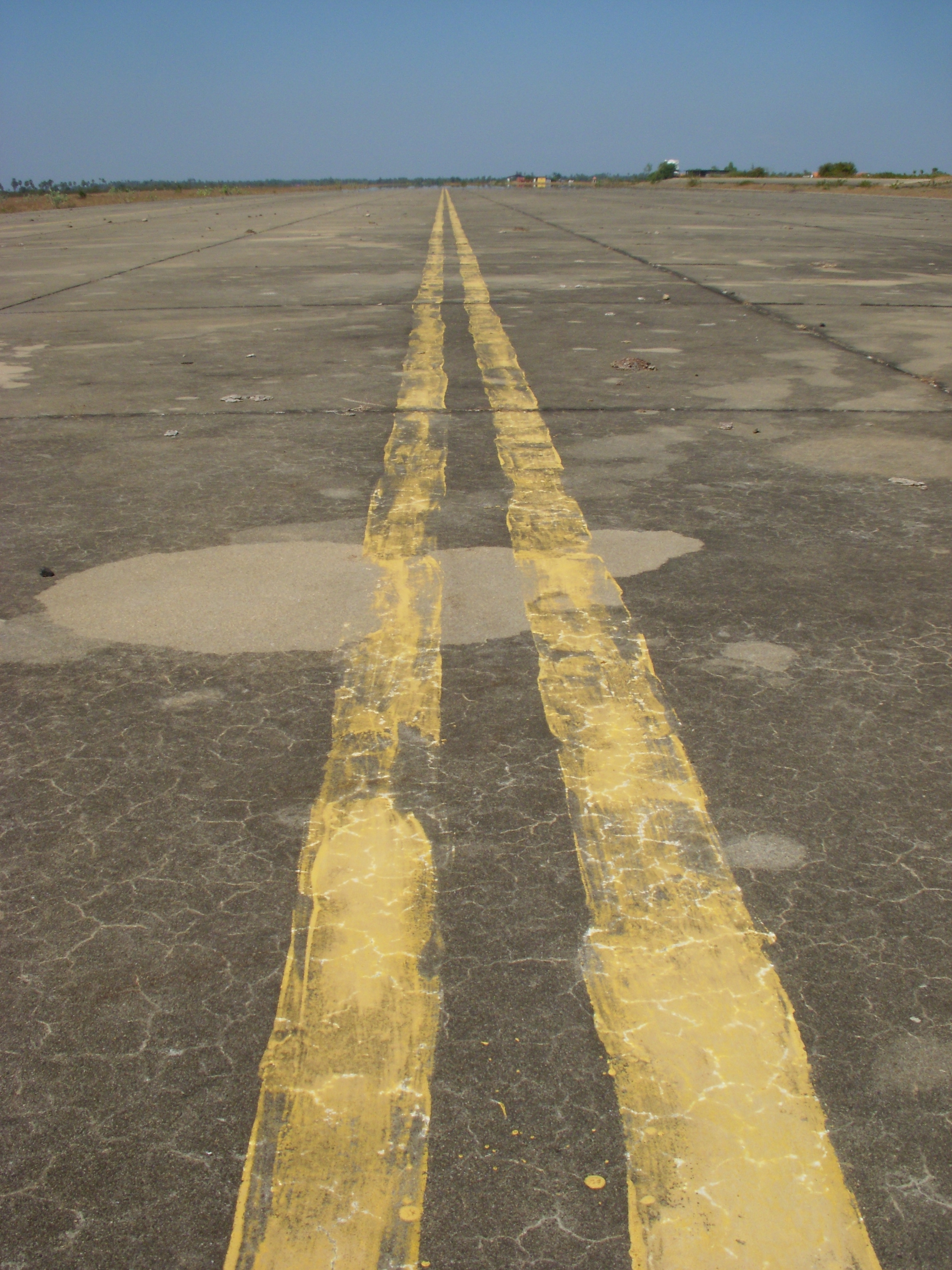
- Kampong Chhnang Airport, constructed by the Khmer Rouge in Rolea B'ier

- Location in Cambodia
- Coordinates: 12°12′N 104°39′E
- Country: Cambodia
- Province: Kampong Chhnang
- Communes: 13
- Villages: 131

Population (1998)
  - Total: 81,134
- Time zone: +7
- Geocode: 0406

Rolea B'ier (Khmer: ស្រុករលាប្អៀរ) is a district (srok) in the center of Kampong Chhnang province, in central Cambodia. The district capital is Rolea B'ier, a town located 5 kilometres south of the provincial capital of Kampong Chhnang. The district is surrounded by other Kampong Chhnang districts and in turn surrounds Kampong Chhnang district which includes the provincial capital. The Tonle Sap serves as the border of the district in the north east. The Kampong Chhnang Airport, built during the period of Democratic Kampuchea (the regime of the Khmer Rouge) lies in Krang Leav commune.

The district has significant road infrastructure and National Highway 5, which runs from Phnom Penh to Poipet, crosses the district running roughly from north to south. Rolea B'ier district is one of the largest districts in Kampong Chhnang province by land area and has by far the largest district population due to well irrigated land and good transport infrastructure. National Road 53, which runs from the provincial capital to Romeas in Tuek Phos district, crosses the district diagonally running from north east to south west. National Road 145 starts at Phlov Veay within the district and runs to a terminus at the rail head at Phnum Ta Sam in Tuek Phos district. Numerous smaller tertiary roads run either from the highway or to the nearby national railway line.

== Location ==
Rolea B'ier district lies in the center of the province and does not share a border with any other provinces. Reading from the north clockwise, Rolea B'ier borders with Baribour district to the north and Kampong Leaeng district to the north east. The eastern border of the district is shared with Kampong Chhnang and Chol Kiri districts. To the south the district shares a border with Kampong Tralach district. The western border of the district joins with Tuek Phos district of Kampong Chhnang.

== Administration ==
The district is subdivided into 13 communes (khum) and 131 villages (phum). The Rolea B'ier district governor reports to Touch Marim, the Governor of Kampong Chhnang. The following table shows the villages of Rolea B'ier district by commune.

Khum (communes)	Phum (villages)
Andoung Snay	Spok Reach, Andoung Snay, Andoung Chrey, Cha, Tbaeng, Pahi, Banpong Phchoek
Banteay Preal	Preal, Thma Reab, Phlov Kou, Toap Srov, Toap Tbaeng, Chheu Neak, Sdok Kabbas, Trapeang Phkoam, Ou Leach, Ruessei Duoch
Cheung Kreav	Ta Lou, Trapeang Popel, Pring Kaong, Luong, Andoung Chek, Tuek Chenh, Souphi, Tang Bampong, Damnak Kei, Knach Kokoh, Ou Loy
Chrey Bak	Tuol Khsach, Prey Kaoh, Prey Puoch, Thmei, Thnal Thmei, Chrey Bak, Ou Kamnab, Ou Kandaol, Prey Leak Neang, Banh Chhkoul, Trapeang An, Khley, a Laeng, Trapeang Kor, Preah Ream Reangsei, Ou Roung
Kouk Banteay	Kouk Banteay, Popel Pok, Mean Chey, Troneam Pech, Ou Ta Sek, Chheu Trach, Kang Meas, Kanlaeng Phe
Krang Leav	Krang Leav, Thmei, Tuek L'ak, Pat Lang, Boeng Veaeng, Srae Veal, Chrolong Kak, Andoung Preng
Pongro	Trapeang Pou, Khvet, Srang Khpos, Phnum Touch, Santey, Dak Krong, Andoung Pour, Thmei, Prambei Chhaom, Trapeang Thum, Thma Reab, Toap Tbaeng
Prasneb	Prey Sampov, Chonleav, S'ang, Srangam Ter, Trapeang Ampil, Prasneb, Chor
Prey Mul	Prey Kraol, Prey Mul, Prachak, Trapeang Kravan, Trapeang Ta Sokh, Ta Vak, Kleng Por
Rolea B'ier	Kruos, Prey Khmaer, Andoung Chroh, Chea Rov, Trapeang Trach, Ou Ta Nes
Srae Thmei	Kdei Tnaot, Chamkar Ta Mau, Santuch, Traok Kaeut, Traok Kandal, Traok Lech, Kol Kob, Trapeang Sbov, Prey Moan, Andoung Ruessei, Trea Tboung, Trea Cheung
Svay Chrum	Thma Kaev, Knong, Krang Prasvay, Utumpor, Sat Lang, Svay Chrum Thmei, Chamkar Khley, Chen, Phlov Veay, Ou Totueng, Tuol Trea, Svay Chrum Chas, Smaet, Thnong Kambot, Chanlaoh Ren, Dambouk Kakaoh, Trapeang Anhchanh, Thnal Ta Saeng, Krapeu Pul, Kaoh Kaev, Svay Chek, Kampong Riang
Tuek Hout	Ou Sandan, Tuek Hout, Preaek Sala, Noneam Totueng, Preaek Reang, Kouk Sdau, Trapeang Krapeu, Tuek L'ak, Ou Sandan Thmei

== Demographics ==
According to the 1998 Census, the population of the district was 81,134 persons in 17,157 households in 1998. This population consisted of 37,190 males (45.8%) and 43,944 females (54.2%). With a population of over 80,000 people, Rolea B'ier has the largest district population in Kampong Chhnang province. The average household size in Rolea B'ier is 4,7 persons per household, which lower than the rural average for Cambodia (5.2 persons). The sex ratio in the district is 84.6%, with significantly more females than males.
