= Sameakki Mean Chey district =

Sameakki Mean Chey ស្រុកសាមគ្គីមានជ័យ
- District (srok)
- Location in Cambodia
- Coordinates: 11°40′N 104°40′E
- Country: Cambodia
- Province: Kampong Chhnang
- Communes: 9
- Villages: 85

Population (1998)
  - Total: 57,170
- Time zone: +7
- Geocode: 0407

Sameakki Mean Chey (Khmer: ស្រុកសាមគ្គីមានជ័យ) is a district (srok) in the south of Kampong Chhnang province, in central Cambodia. The district capital is Sameakki Mean Chey town located on the rail line some 52 kilometres south of the provincial capital of Kampong Chhnang by road. The district shares a border with Kandal and Kampong Speu provinces to the south. The National Railway line from Phnom Penh to Sisophon runs through the district crossing roughly from north to south.

The district has access to significant transport infrastructure and National Highway 5 which runs from Phnom Penh to Poipet forms the south eastern border of the district. Three smaller provincial roads cross the district from the National highway to the rail line running roughly east to west. National Road 138 starts at Kampong Tralach town and runs across the district to its terminus at Chleb in Tuek Phos district. Numerous smaller tertiary roads run either to the nearby national railway line or to the National highway.

== Social land concessions ==
Sameakki Mean Chey is one of two sites chosen for a 1.5 million dollar project funded by the Japan Social Development Fund through the World Bank to give state owned land to the poorest families in the district. Under the project, 732 families in Sameakki Meanchey and 561 families in Phnom Srouch district in Kampong Speu province will receive grants of state land for housing and agriculture. In total, the social land concessions cover 2,800 hectares with 1,513 ha in Sameakki Meanchey and 1,300 ha in Phnom Srouch.

== Location ==
Sameakki Mean Chey district lies in the south of the province and shares a border with Kandal and Kampong Speu provinces. Reading from the north clockwise, Sameakki Mean Chey borders with Tuek Phos district to the north and Rolea B'ier district to the north east. The eastern border of the district is shared with Kampong Tralach district. To the south the district shares a border with Odongk and Thpong districts of Kampong Speu province. The western border of the district joins with Tuek Phos district of Kampong Chhnang.

== Administration ==
The district is subdivided into 9 communes (khum) and 85 villages (phum). The Sameakki Mean Chey district governor reports to Touch Marim, the Governor of Kampong Chhnang. The following table shows the villages of Sameakki Mean Chey district by commune.

Khum (communes)	Phum (villages)
Chhean Laeung	Chrak Tnaot, Traeng, Royeas, Trapeang thma, Srae Ruessei, Krang Samraong, Anlong Pring, Chuonh Chit
Khnar Chhmar	Voat, Trapeang Srangae, Chrey Kaong Lech, Chrey Kaong Kaeut, Thma Sa, Khnar Kandal, Tradak Pong
Krang Lvea	Thnal, Krang Lvea, Ou Kakhob, Chres, KhnaTey Mouk, Ta Krong, Thlok Roleung, Chumteav Chreaeng, Tang Kruos Lech, Tang Kruos Kaeut
Peam	Tang Poun, Krang Doung, Chanva riel, Srae Andoung, Ta Kaev, Krang Beng, Svay Kambet, Chrab Kantuot, Krang Kantoul, Chrak Sdach, Chrak Kov, Serei Vong
Sedthei	Chamkar Svay, Spean Pou, Thlok Ruessei, Boeng Leach, Khnach, Krang Siem, Angkrong, Voat Sedthei, Peareach, Doun Kaev
Svay	Trapeang Buon, Chamkar, Hangs Chhuk, Trapeang Thma, Tuol Pongro, Svay Pok, Kyang Tboung, Khyang Cheung, Krasang Pul, Pou Ritthi Krai, Thmei, Chonloat Dai, Svay Ph'aem
Svay Chuk	Kngaok pong, Trapeang Pring, Damnak Pring, Trapeang Mtes, Tang Krang, Krang Srama, Trapeang Tumloab, Prey Nheam, Tang Khley, Chrak Sangkae
Tbaeng Khpos	Roleang, Neang Mealea, Veal Ta King, Thmei, Tbaeng Khpos, Srae Mkak, Meanok Lech, Meanok Kaeut, Ra
Thlok Vien	Thlok Vien, Srae Krau, Tang Tbaeng, Chhuk, Spean Daek, Toap Baoh, Praklout

== Demographics ==
According to the 1998 Census, the population of the district was 57,170 persons in 11,660 households in 1998. This population consisted of 27,014 males (47.3%) and 30,156 females (52.7%). With a population of over 50,000 people, Sameakki Mean Chey has an average district population for Kampong Chhnang province. The average household size in Sameakki Mean Chey is 4.9 persons per household, which is lower than the rural average for Cambodia (5.2 persons). The sex ratio in the district is 89.6%, with significantly more females than males.
