= National Road 53 (Cambodia) =

National Road 53 is a national road of Cambodia. It connects the city of Kampong Chhnang with the town of Romeas in Kampong Chhnang Province. The road is connected to National Highway 5 via National Road 141 which links it to Prey Khmer town.

At Romeas the highway becomes National Road 142 which links it to National Road 138.
