= Kaoh Thkov =

Commune in Chol Kiri District, Kampong Chhnang Province, Cambodia

Kaoh Thkov (Khmer: កោះថ្កូវ) is a commune located in Chol Kiri District, Kampong Chhnang Province, Cambodia, containing ten villages. Situated beside the Tonle Sap River, the commune is largely sustained by rice-growing and fishing.
