= Baribour district =

Baribour ស្រុកបរិបូណ៌
- District (srok)
- Location in Cambodia
- Coordinates: 12°26′N 104°27′E
- Country: Cambodia
- Province: Kampong Chhnang
- Communes: 11
- Villages: 64

Population (1998)
  - Total: 51,516
- Time zone: +7
- Geocode: 0401

Baribour (Khmer: ស្រុកបរិបូណ៌ "Abundance") is a district (srok) in the north of Kampong Chhnang province, in central Cambodia. The district capital is Baribour town located around 38 kilometres north west of the provincial capital of Kampong Chhnang by road. The district shares a border with Pursat province to the west and with Kampong Thom province to the north. The district borders on the Tonlé Sap and the Tonlé Sap River forms the northern and eastern borders of the district.

The district is easily accessed by road from Kampong Chhnang (38 km) Pursat (55 km) and Phnom Penh (129 km). Baribour district is one of the smallest districts in Kampong Chhnang province by land area and only Chol Kiri district is smaller. However, it has an average district population for the province due to the Tonle Sap and the National Highway. National Highway 5 which begins in Phnom Penh and ends at Poipet bisects the district running from north west to south east. National road 52 begins at the highway at Ponley and runs north to the port of Kampong Preah.

== Location ==
Baribour district lies in the north of the province and shares a border with Pursat and Kampong Thom provinces. Reading from the north clockwise, Baribour borders with Stoung district of Kampong Thom to the north. The eastern border of the district is shared with Kampong Leaeng district.

== Administration ==
The district is subdivided into 11 communes (khum) and 64 villages (phum).

Khum (commune)	Phum (villages)
Anhchanh Rung	Anhchanh Rung, Andoung Rovieng, Damrei Koun, Prey Preal, Stueng Thmei, Thlok Chrov
Chhnok Tru	Chhnok Tru, Kampong Preah, Seh Slab
Chak	Ta Pang, Pou Mreah, Ou Rumchek, Chak, Dangkhau Mau
Khon Rang	Snao, Daeum Chreae, Serei, Lbaeuk, Kansaeng, Dak Por, Kok, Popel, Trapeang Pou, Kampong Uor
Kampong Preah Kokir	Preaek Spean, Kaoh Ta Mov, Stueng Chrov, Damnak Reach
Melum	Srah Kaev, Tuol Thlok, Melum, Kan Yuor, Tuol Roka
Phsar	Kbal Thnal, Kamprong, Phsar, Thmei, Chumteav Botrei, Prey Ta Mung, Phniet
Pech Changvar	Tang Thnuem, Tang Trapeang, Lvea, Krang Kakaoh, Tuek Chroab, Thnal
Popel	Cheang Luong, Ou, Tuol Pou, Kraol Chi, Bos Meas, Sala Khum, Krang Khmaer, Angk
Ponley	Ponley, Cheung Khnar, Kaev Lat, Svay Koy, Ou, Cheang Luong
Trapeang Chan	Trapeang Chan, Kandal, Sanlang, Kbal Damrei
