= Kampong Leaeng district =

Kampong Leaeng ស្រុកកំពងលែង
- District (srok)
- Location in Cambodia
- Coordinates: 12°16′N 104°43′E
- Country: Cambodia
- Province: Kampong Chhnang
- Communes: 9

Population (1998)
  - Total: 37,379
- Time zone: +7
- Geocode: 0404

Kampong Leaeng (Khmer: ស្រុកកំពង់លែង) is a district (srok) in the north east of Kampong Chhnang province, in central Cambodia. The district capital is Kampong Leaeng town located around 4 kilometres east of the provincial capital of Kampong Chhnang in a direct line. Kampong Leaeng district is the northernmost district of Kampong Chhnang. The district shares a border with Kampong Thom province to north and east. Much of the district is low-lying floodplain and the Tonle Sap river runs through the district roughly from north to south. In the south of the district are two significant mountains. Phnom Chrak Tunling and Phnom Neang Kangrei both over 1000 metres in elevation.

The district has very little road infrastructure. There is one provincial ring road that circles the small mountains in the district's south. This road is accessible from National Highway 6 in Stueng Saen district of Kampong Thom. Settlements are located along this road or along the Tonlé Sap River and various smaller tributaries. Kampong Leaeng district is the second largest district in Kampong Chhnang province by land area and only Tuek Phos is larger. However, it has the smallest district population in the province after Chol Kiri due to its flooded landscape and lack of road transport infrastructure.

== Diarrhoea epidemic ==
In 2008, Kampong Leaeng was the site of a diarrhea epidemic that struck down over 100 people in Samraong Saen commune. As safe potable water sources are rare in the district people had been taking drinking water from stagnant ponds. This contaminated water was believed to have caused the epidemic. Forty six people were affected by the water in the first 24 hours and three days later the toll had risen to 113 people. Medical staff from Kampong Chhnang hospital were dispatched by boat to stay in the commune to provide treatment and monitor those affected. Five people became seriously ill and were hospitalized.

== Location ==
Kampong Leaeng district lies in the north of the province and shares a border with Kampong Thom province. Reading from the north clockwise, Kampong Leaeng borders with Kampong Svay, Stueng Saen, Santuk and Baray districts of Kampong Thom from the north to the east. To the south the district shares a border with Chol Kiri and Kampong Chhnang districts of Kampong Chhnang. The western border of the district joins with Baribour and Rola B'ier districts.

== Administration ==
The district is subdivided into 9 communes (khum) and 44 villages (phum). The Kampong Leaeng district governor reports to Touch Marim, the Governor of Kampong Chhnang. The following table shows the villages of Kampong Leaeng district by commune.

Khum (communes)	Phum (villages)
Chranouk	Kangkaeb, Thlok, Lech, Kandal
Dar	Dar, Thnal, Chrolong, Prasat, Kuy
Kampong Hau	Kampong Boeng, Kaeng Ta Sok, T'uor Rolum, Stueng Sandaek, Kaoh K'aek, Doun Veat
Phlov Tuk	Thnal Chheu Teal, Peam Knong, Slat
Pou	Pou, Samraong, Peam Tonlea, Thmei, Damnak Kakaoh, Kampong Ba Chen
Pralay Meas	Pralay Meas, Krang Phtel, Kramal, Anlong Kanhchoh, Ta Daok, Kaoh Ruessei
Samraong Saen	Samraong Saen, Paprak
Svay Rumpear	Chambak Khpos, Knong, Cheung Kraoh, Lvea, Ta Lat
Trangel	Trangel, Trabaek, Chres, Tumnob, Trapeang Meas, Andoung Ronuk, Khlaeng Poar

== Demographics ==
According to the 1998 Census, the population of the district was 37,379 persons in 6,955 households in 1998. This population consisted of 18,010 males (48.2%) and 19,369 females (51.8%). With a population of under 40,000 people, Kampong Leaeng has one of the smallest district populations in Kampong Chhnang province. The average household size in Kampong Leaeng is 5.4 persons per household, which is slightly larger than the rural average for Cambodia (5.2 persons). The sex ratio in the district is 93.0%, with significantly more females than males.
