= Tramung Chrum =

Village in Cambodia

Tramung Chrum is a village in Cambodia in Kampong Chhnang Province. It has a population of about 500, located about 60 km. from the capital of Phnom Penh. The population consists of Muslim Chams, one of Cambodia's ethnic minorities, and has therefore been largely ignored by the central government. The economy is based on subsistence agriculture and menial labor. There is no electricity or running water. A school was established in the village in 2005.

== Sources ==
- Lightman, Alan, "Red, White and Bamboo," in The New York Times, 5 July 2005, p. A17.
