= Kampong Chhnang Airport =

Airport in Kampong Chhnang, Cambodia

Kampong Chhnang Airport អាកាសយានដ្ឋានកំពង់ឆ្នាំង
- IATA: KZC; ICAO: VDKH

Summary
- Airport type: Defunct
- Operator: Government
- Serves: Kompong Chhnang, Cambodia
- Elevation AMSL: 17 m (56 ft)
- Coordinates: 12°15′18″N 104°33′49″E

Map
- Location of airport in Cambodia

Runways
Direction	Length		Surface
Direction	m	ft	Surface
18/36	2,400	7,874	Concrete

Statistics (?)
- Passenger movements: ?
- Airfreight movements in tonnes: ?
- Aircraft movements: ?
- Source: DAFIF

Kampong Chhnang Airport (IATA: KZC, ICAO: VDKH) is an abandoned airport near Kampong Chhnang, the capital of the Kampong Chhnang Province in Cambodia. It is located near Pratlang village in Rolea B'ier district, roughly 60 kilometers northwest of Phnom Penh. The airfield was built by the Khmer Rouge and abandoned during the Cambodian genocide in the late 1970s.

== History ==
Plans to construct the airport began in 1975, organized by the Khmer Rouge with considerable assistance from Chinese advisors. Construction began in early 1976 with forced labor, similar to other infrastructure projects initiated by the Khmer Rouge. The total number of laborers initially was in the hundreds, and by 1977 was estimated to be more than 10,000. Workers died in significant numbers due to malnutrition, exposure, disease, and execution, and were buried in mass graves at the site. It is unknown how many died in total during the construction, however, local villagers have stated that the stench of decomposing corpses remained for years after the site was abandoned. There is no placard or memorial at the site.

== Facilities ==
The airport resides at an elevation of 60 feet (18 m) above mean sea level. It has one runway designed 18/36 with a concrete surface measuring 2,400 by 50 metres (7,874 ft × 164 ft). The airfield has been abandoned since the late 1970s.
