= National Highway 5 (Cambodia) =

Road in Cambodia

National Highway 5

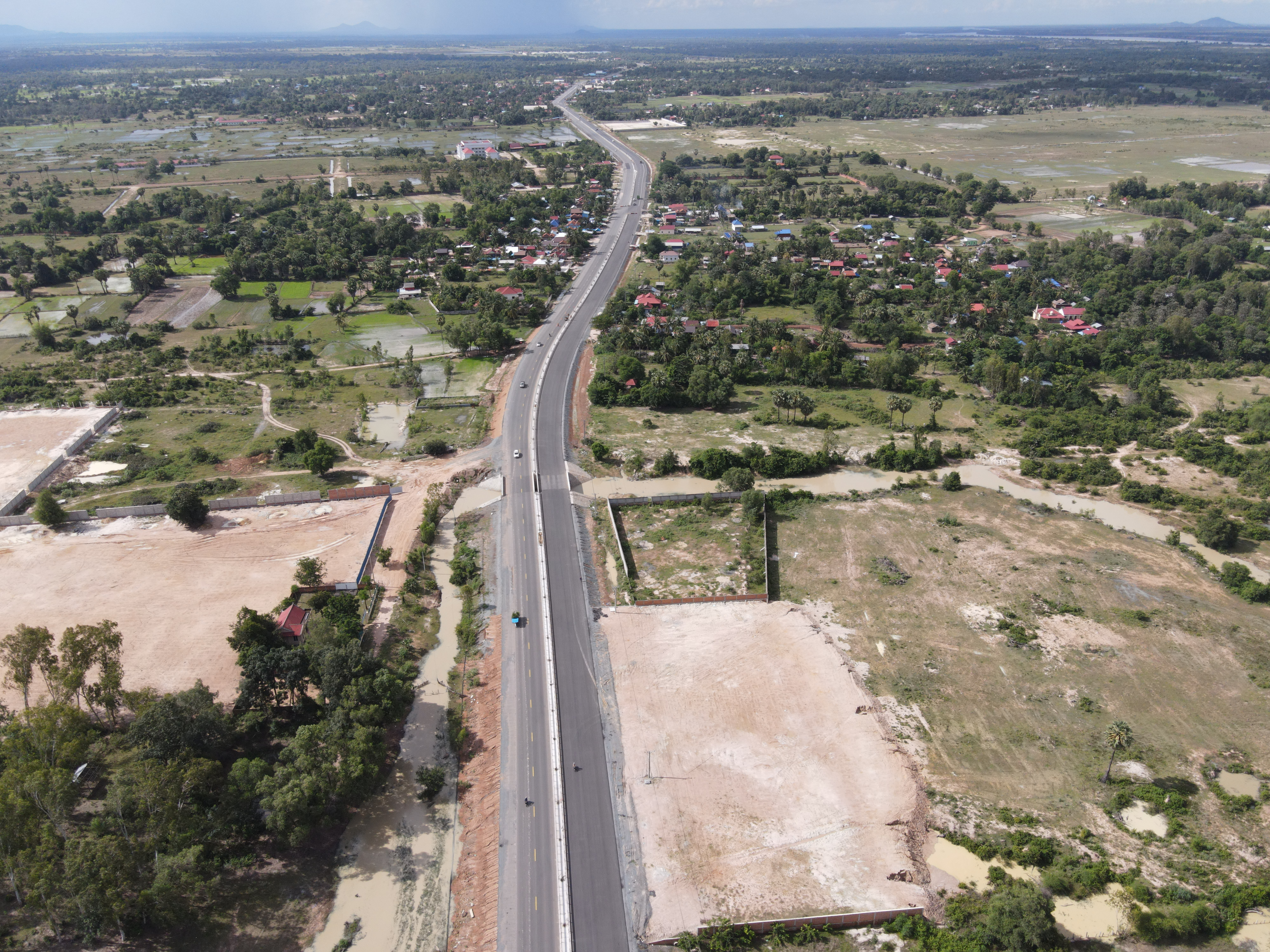
- National highway 5 (AH1) at Kilometric Point 58 to Kampong Chhnang

Route information
- Part of AH1

Location
- Country: Cambodia

Highway system
- Transport in Cambodia

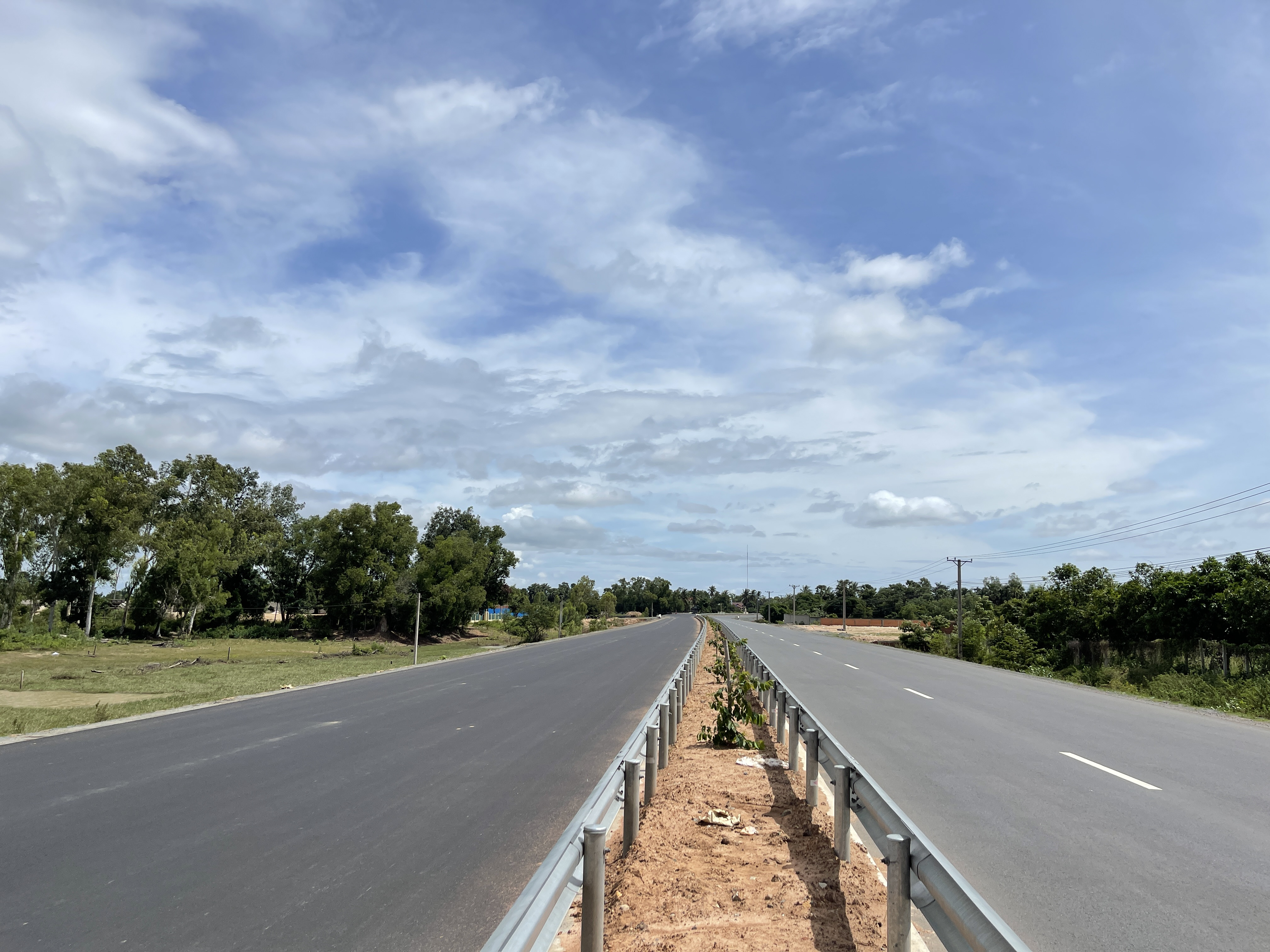
National Highway 5, Kampong Tralach, Kampong Chhnang

National Highway 5 or National Road No.5 (10005) is one of the national highways of Cambodia. With a length of 407.45 km (253.18 mi), it connects the capital of Phnom Penh with Thailand. NH5 leaves Phnom Penh in a north to northwest direction, it first borders the Tonle Sap, three bridges the Chroy Changvar, the Prek Kdam and the Prek Pnov link the East of the country. Then it moves away from the river/lake because the land there is flooded part of the year and it exits Kandal Province and traverses Kampong Chhnang Province from the junction with Road 51, north to Kampong Chhnang City, then northwest to Baribour District where it crosses into Pursat Province. From there, it skirts the Tonle Sap lake and continues west to Pursat town, the provincial capital. Leaving Pursat, NH5 again turns northwest and leads to Battambang Province, passing through another provincial capital at Battambang city and continuing on to Serei Saophoan District in Banteay Meanchey Province where it meets the terminus of NH6 and bends westward towards its own terminus at Poipet on the Thai border.
