= Chroy Changvar Bridge =

Bridge in Cambodia

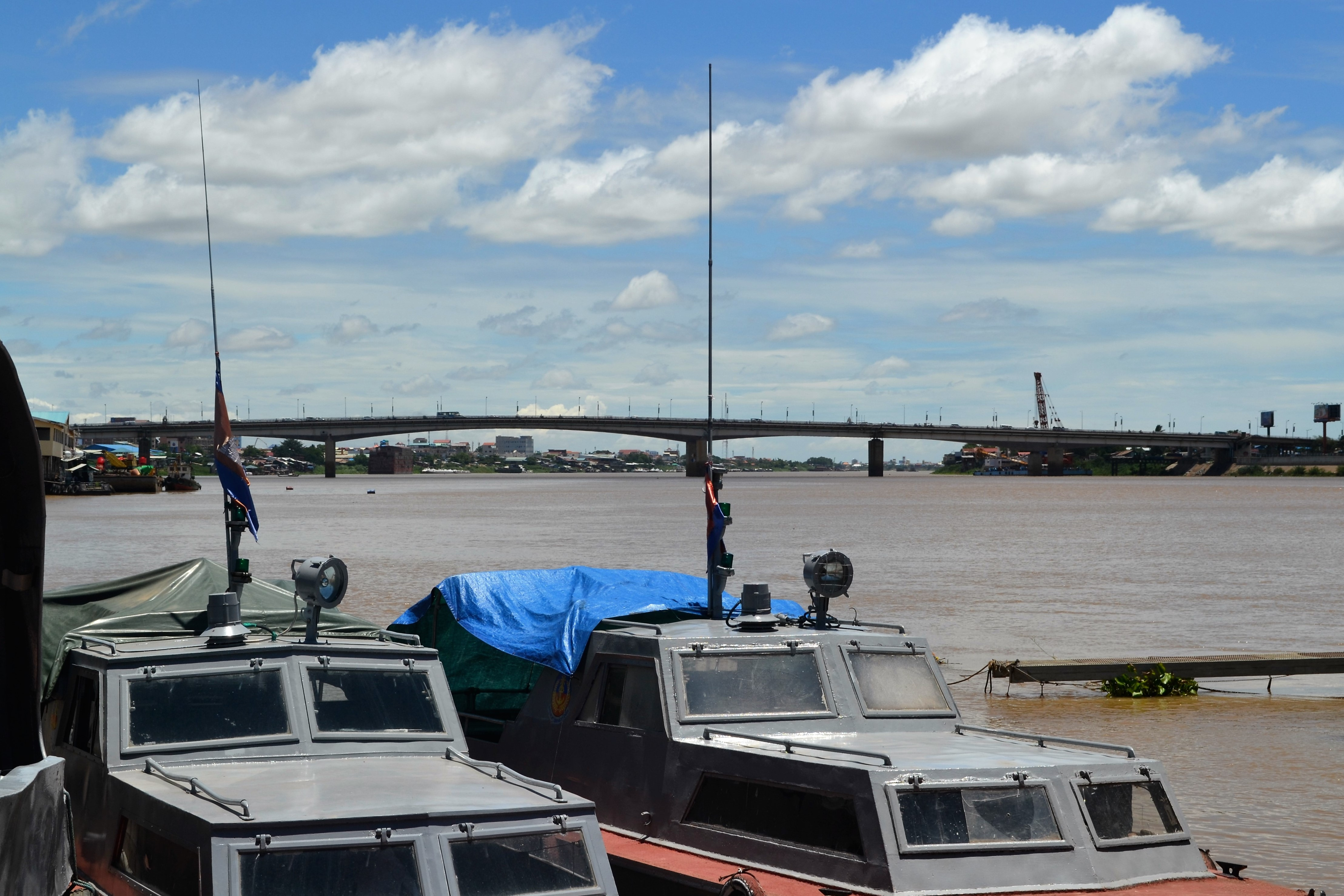
Chroy Changvar 2016 1.jpg

The Chroy Changva Bridge (also known as the Cambodian-Japanese Kizuna Friendship Bridge) is a 709-meter bridge that crosses the Tonlé Sap River in Phnom Penh, originally built in 1963, with Japanese aid. Severely damaged during the civil war in 1972 and 1973, it remained closed until it reopened on 26 February 1994 About 10 km (6.2 mi) north of it there is another bridge the Prek Kdam Bridge, then the Prek Pnov Bridge and no more bridges on the Tonle Sap, a temporary bridge should open in April 2018, the construction of a concrete bridge should start just after that.

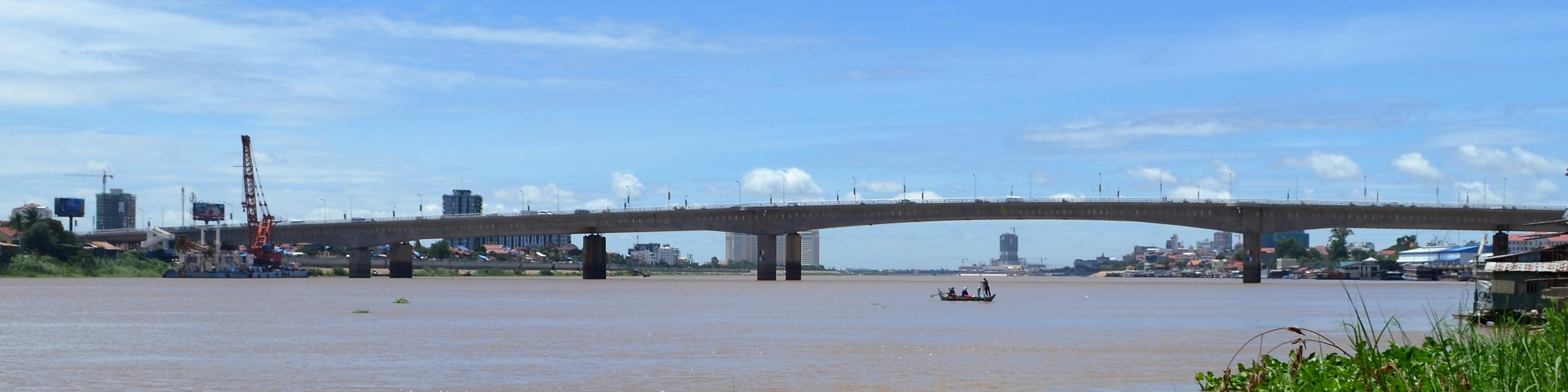
Chroy Changva Bridge from the North

== 1972 attack ==
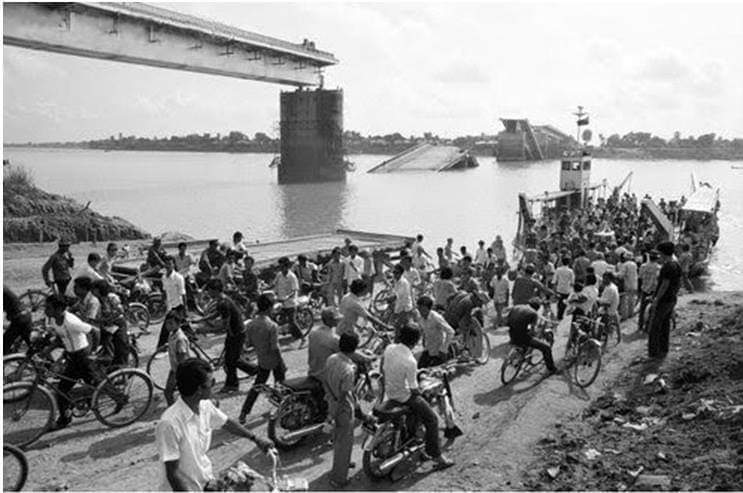
Chroy Changva Bridge collapse

On 24 March 1972 People's Army of Vietnam/Khmer Rouge Sappers blew up an explosive-packed vehicle on the bridge, collapsing several spans into the Mekong River and killing three civilians.
