= Stung Sen Dam =

Dam in Cambodia

- Location within Cambodia
- Official name: Stung Sen Hydropower Dam
- Country: Cambodia
- Location: Preah Vihéar
- Coordinates: 13°18′13.4″N 105°15′11.5″E
- Status: Proposed
- Construction cost: +US$300 million

Dam and spillways
- Type of dam: Seasonal storage
- Impounds: Stung Sen River
- Height: 38 m (125 ft)

Reservoir
- Creates: Stung Sen Dam Reservoir

Power Station
- Installed capacity: 40 MW (54,000 hp)
- Annual generation: 20 GWh (72 TJ)

Stung Sen Dam is a proposed multipurpose dam to be located on the Stung Sen River. The river originates in Preah Vihear and flows to the Tonlé Sap Lake in Kompong Thom, southeast of Phnom Rovieng, Cambodia. Under MoU study project and Feasibility Study by Korean company. The large reservoir would submerge Kompong Putrea. Exact data for reservoir size and number of displaced people is not available, nor is any information on the importance of the Stung Sen's flow to the Tonle Sap Lake or fisheries.

The Cambodian government planned to have many dams on the Tonle Sap and the Mekong tributary. Tonle Sap Lake is the largest fresh water body in Cambodia and serves as a buffer in the Mekong River system for flood mitigation and is the source of beneficial dry season flows. The Tonle Sap River drains the Tonle Sap Lake from the northwest before it continues further southeastward to its lower delta in Vietnam.

Status: The project is listed as "second phase" priority by the CNMC.: The Stung Sen Dam is to be constructed after the Prek Thnot, Stung Battambang, and Stung Chinit dams.

== See also ==
- Mekong
- Mekong River Commission
