= Cambodian Midget Fighting League =

2005 internet hoax

The Cambodian Midget Fighting League (or CMFL) is the premise of an Internet hoax that was widely circulated around the Internet beginning in May, 2005. The hoax was particularly significant as the article was taken on face value by a good deal of British newspapers and magazines. Some newspapers referred to the incident as a tragedy, but some magazines, notably 'lad's mag' FHM, reported it as news, but did so from a humorous angle.

The article was also commented on in The Ricky Gervais Show episode "Knob at Night", where the discussion also regarded the incident as a real event. Other notable appearances of the article include:

- The 20 May 2005 episode of The Howard Stern Show
- The 20 May 2005 issue of the New York Post
- The November 2005 issue of Maxim Magazine
- On the 29 January 2011 edition of BBC Radio 5 Live's Fighting Talk, Gail Emms fell foul of the hoax when giving it as an answer
- As a background article in the Hitman: Blood Money video game after the 'A House of Cards' Las Vegas Casino level
- Many other US radio stations

== Premise ==
The article was reported as a tragedy at a midget-versus-lion fight in Cambodia. A fan of the Cambodian Midget Fighting League challenged the league's president in response to a recent league advertising campaign that the midgets will "take on anything; man, beast, or machine". The fan claimed that one lion could defeat the entire league of forty-two midget fighters. Accepting the challenge, an African lion was flown to Kampong Chhnang, specially for the event.

"The fight was called off after only 12 minutes and 28 of the fighters were declared dead, while the other 14 suffered severe injuries including broken bones and lost limbs, rendering them unable to fight back."
