= National Road 142 (Cambodia) =

Road in Cambodia

National Road 142 is a national road of Cambodia. The National Road 53 joins the NR 142 at the town of Romeas in Kampong Chhnang Province. The road connects the town to National Highway 138.
