= Tuek Phos (town) =

- Town
- Location within Cambodia
- Coordinates: 11°18′N 104°38′E
- Country: Cambodia
- Province: Kampong Chhnang Province
- District: Tuek Phos District

Tuek Phos is a small town and capital of Tuek Phos District in Kampong Chhnang Province, Cambodia.
