= Rôméas =

Rôméas Phumĭ Phsa Rôméas
- Town
- Location within Cambodia
- Coordinates: 12°3′N 104°31′E
- Country: Cambodia
- Province: Kampong Chhnang Province
- District: Tuek Phos District

Phumĭ Phsa Rôméas is a small town in Tuek Phos District in Kampong Chhnang Province, Cambodia. The town is connected to Kampong Chhnang in the north by National Road 53. The National Road 142 begins to the south-west of the town and connects it to National Road 138.

The town is also connected by the railway.
