= Tuek Phos district =

Tuek Phos ស្រុកទឹកផុស
- District (srok)
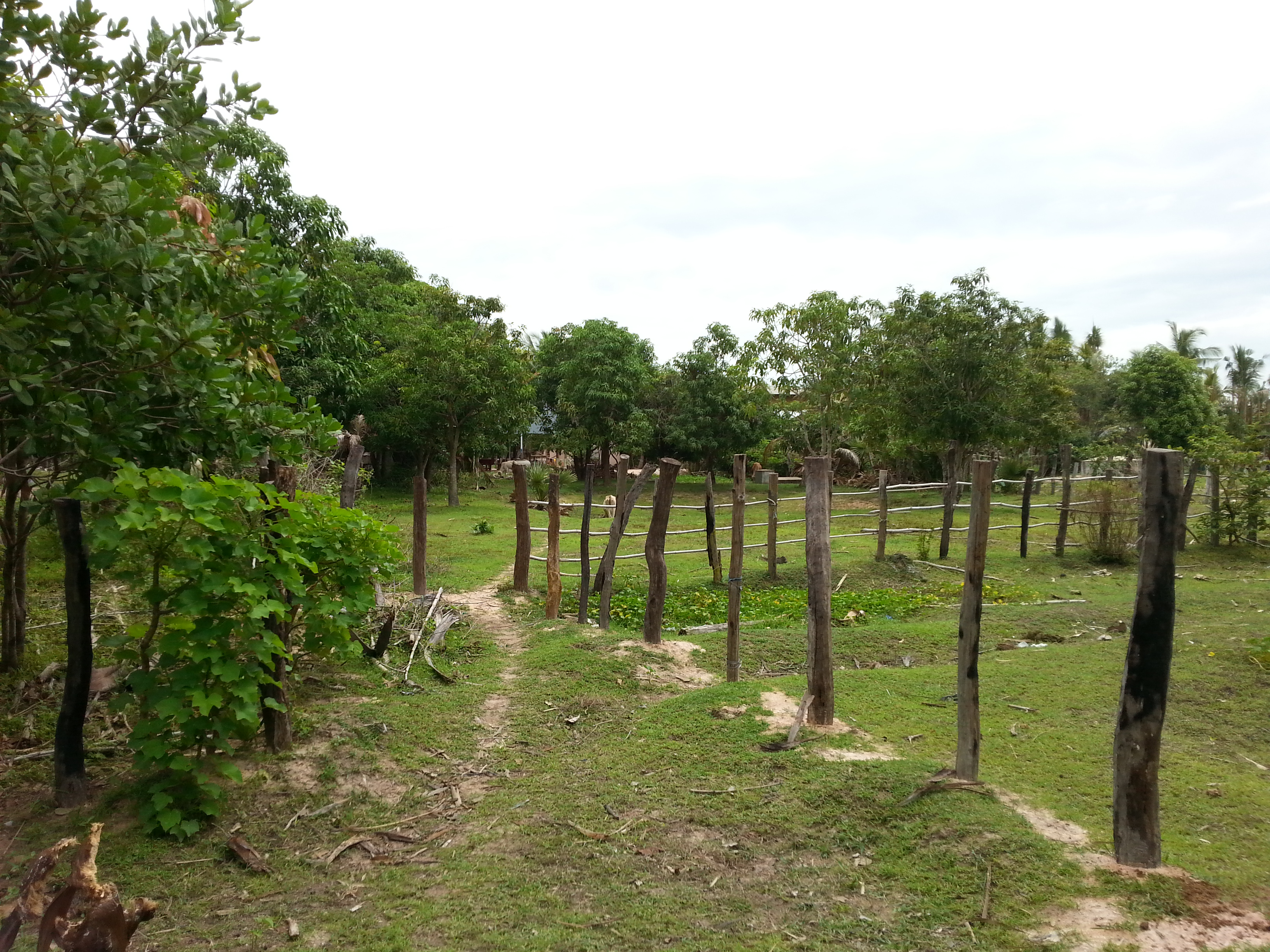
- A field in Khum Khlong Popok

- Location in Cambodia
- Coordinates: 12°00′N 104°30′E
- Country: Cambodia
- Province: Kampong Chhnang
- Communes: 9
- Villages: 78

Population (1998)
  - Total: 45,950
- Time zone: +7
- Geocode: 0408

Tuek Phos (Khmer: ស្រុកទឹកផុស; literally "Emerging Water") is a district (srok) in the west of Kampong Chhnang province, in central Cambodia. The district capital is Tuek Phos town located on the rail line some 28 kilometres south west of the provincial capital of Kampong Chhnang by road. The district shares a border with Pursat and Kampong Speu provinces to the west. The National Railway line from Phnom Penh to Sisophon runs through the district entering in the south and exiting in the north west.

The eastern side of the railway line crossing the district has access to significant road infrastructure and is quite well populated. To the west of the railway there are few settlements and the foothills of Phnom Aural rise in the north west, although the peak itself is just over the border in Pursat Province. The northwestern edge of the district forms part of the Phnom Aural Wildlife Sanctuary. National Road 53 from Kampong Chhnang town to Romeas terminates in the district as does National Road 138 from Kampong Tralach to Cheab. National Road 142 begins at Tuek Phos town and runs south west to Spean Dach in Kampong Speu province. Numerous smaller tertiary roads run from the national railway line to the National highway.

== Location ==
Tuek Phos district lies in the west of the province and shares a border with Pursat and Kampong Speu provinces. Reading from the north clockwise, Tuek Phos borders with Krakor district of Pursat to the north. The eastern border of the district is shared with Baribour and Rolea B'ier districts. To the south the district shares a border with Sameakki Mean Chey district. The western border of the district joins with Thpong and Aoral districts of Kampong Speu and Phnum Kravanh district of Pursat.

== Land conflict ==
On 8 January 2000 Pheapimex Co. Ltd was granted two large land concessions covering a total of 315,028 hectares to grow eucalyptus in Pursat and Kampong Chhnang provinces. The massive concession includes most of the land area of Tuek Phos district. The company is now trying to sell the entire 176,000 hectare Kampong Chhnang land concession through an internet real estate listing by a Singapore-based holding company as a potential bio-diesel plantation.

== Administration ==
As of 2020, the district is subdivided into 9 communes (khum) and 78 villages (phum). The Tuek Phos district governor reports to Touch Marim, the Governor of Kampong Chhnang. The following table shows the villages of Tuek Phos district by commune.

Khum (commune)	Phum (villages)
Akphivoadth	Srae Ta Chey, Trapeang Reang, Srae Prich, Srae Khtum, Tuek Chum, Ropeak, Damreb, Trapeang Pring, Baek Chak, Srae Ta Chey Khang Lech
Chieb	Chi Prang, Tumnob Thmei, Boeng Steng, Prey Tang Thnong, Kaoh Kandal, Chhak Kandaol, Kouk Penh, Toap Ta Lat, Sae Robang, Ta Ney, Kaoh Khtum
Chaong Maong	Chaong Maong, Doun Mau, Khsaet, Thmei, Peareang, Svay Chek, Akleangkaer, Trapeang Chum
Kbal Tuek	Krasang Doh Laeung, Doung Sla, Tang Khsach, Tang Sya, Ngoy, Chipuk, Moung, Prey Chrov, Thnal Kaeng, Khvit Toul Khleang
Khlong Popok	Trapeang Krabau, Yout, Khlong Popok, Ta Kab, Kraoy Voat, Trapeang Chrey, Boeng Steng
Krang Skear	Krang Skear, Tuol Samraong, Phnum Ta Sam, Chan Trak, Trapeang Mlu, Chambak Prasat, Krang Skear Khang Tboung
Tang Krasang	Chambak Kantreanh, Tbaeng Khpos, Chas, Kouk Nang, Krang Ta Mom, Srae Uk, Romeas, Kouk Puoch, Veal Sbov, Thmei, Tang Krasang, Krang Ma
Toul Khpos	Roka Tong, La, Voat, Trapeang Smach, Srae Chan, Slaeng, Rolung
Kdol Saen Chey	Anhchanh, Damnak Ampil, Damnak Khlong, Kdol, Ou Lpov, Phnum Ta Os

== Demographics ==
According to the 1998 Census, the population of the district was 45,950 persons in 9,416 households in 1998. This population consisted of 21,789 males (47.4%) and 24,161 females (52.6%). With a population of over 45,000 people, Tuek Phos has an average district population for Kampong Chhnang province. The average household size in Tuek Phos is 4.9 persons per household, which is lower than the rural average for Cambodia (5.2 persons). The sex ratio in the district is 90.2%, with significantly more females than males.
