= Steung Saen River =

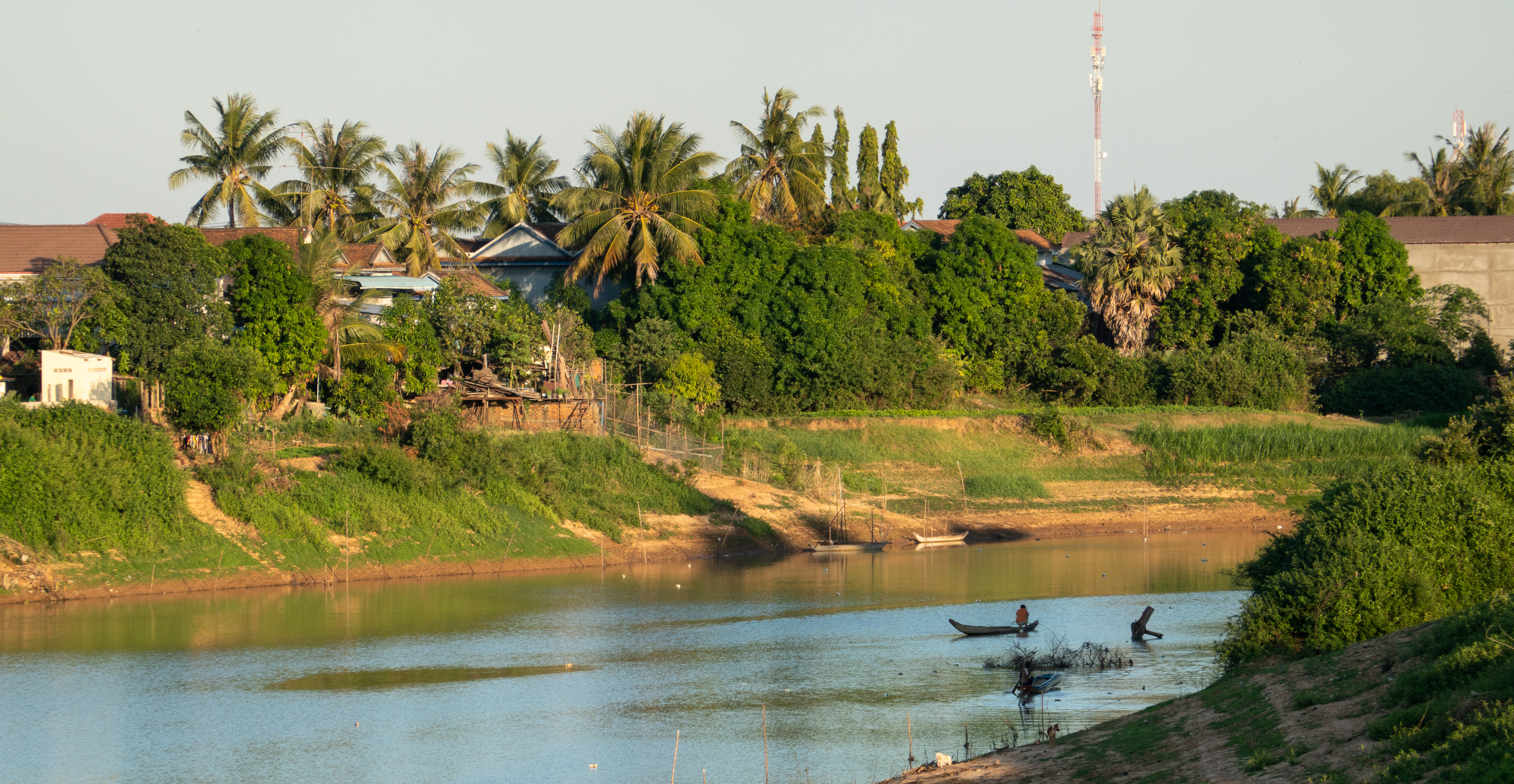
- Stung Saen at Kampong Thom
- Native name: ស្ទឹងសែន (Khmer)

Location
- Country: Cambodia
- Provinces: Preah Vihear Province and Kampong Thom Province

Physical characteristics
- Mouth: Tonlé Sap River
  - coordinates: 12°31′59″N 104°26′15″E
- Length: 520 km (320 mi)
- Basin size: 16,344 km^{2} (6,310 sq mi)

Basin features
- Average runoff: 11,685 m^{3} per second

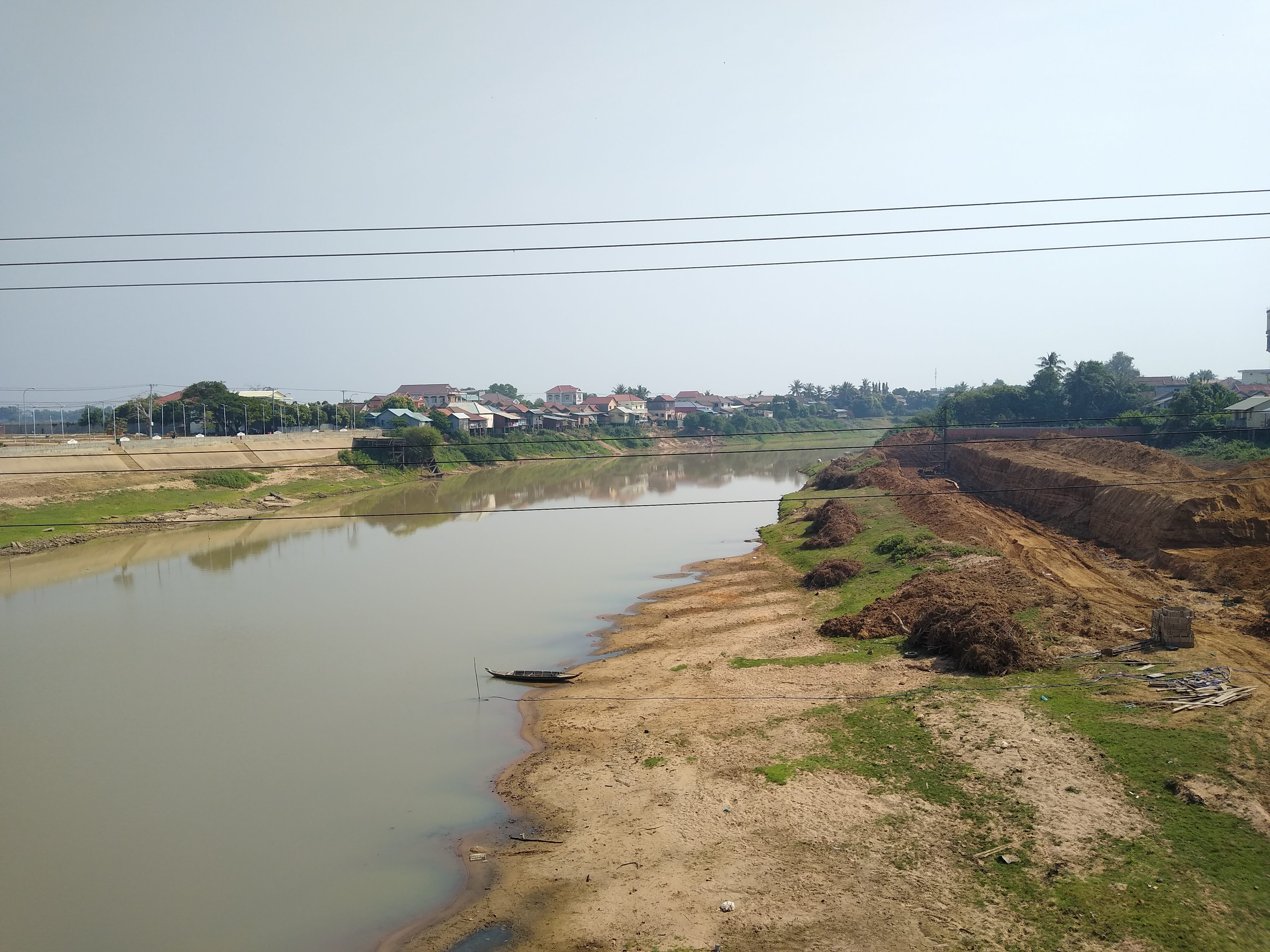
Steung Saen River in Kampong Thom

Steung Saen River (ស្ទឹងសែន), sometimes spelt Steung Sen, is a river in Cambodia. It is a major tributary of the Tonlé Sap River. The Stung Sen River Basin is the largest among the 11 main tributaries around Tonlé Sap with a catchment surface of 16,344 km^{2} (1,634,400 ha). The basin receives about 1,500 mm (59 in) of rain per year.

The river passes through Preah Vihear Province and Kampong Thom Province. The northern extent of the river basin corresponds to the border with Thailand as in 1904, Siam and the French colonial authorities ruling Cambodia formed a joint commission to demarcate their mutual border to largely follow the watershed line of the Dângrêk mountain range.

== Etymology ==
Steung Saen (ស្ទឹងសែន) means "river of soldiers" in Khmer. Steung (ស្ទឹង) means river in Khmer, while Saen (សែន) is derived from the Sanskrit word Sena (सेना), meaning "soldier".
