= Chol Kiri district =

Chol Kiri ស្រុកជលគិរី
- District (srok)
- Location in Cambodia
- Coordinates: 12°10′N 104°52′E
- Country: Cambodia
- Province: Kampong Chhnang
- Communes: 5
- Villages: 26

Population (1998)
  - Total: 28,300
- Time zone: +7
- Geocode: 0402

Chol Kiri (Khmer: ស្រុកជលគិរី) is a district (srok) in the east of Kampong Chhnang province, in central Cambodia. The district capital is Chol Kiri town located around eight km (5.0 mi) south of the provincial capital of Kampong Chhnang by road. Chol Kiri district is the easternmost district of Kampong Chhnang. The district shares a border with Kampong Thom and Kampong Cham provinces to the east. Most of the district is low lying floodplain and the Tonlé Sap River runs through the district roughly from north to south. This proximity to the river and the lack of high land make Chol Kiri one of the most flood prone districts in the country. The Kampong Chhnang Department of Development has estimated that both Chol Kiri and Kampong Leaeng districts are flooded for six months of the year and that after the floodwaters have receded drinking water sources are left contaminated.

The district has virtually no significant road infrastructure and all settlements are located along the Tonle Sap river and various smaller tributaries. Chol Kiri district is one of the smallest districts in Kampong Chhnang province by land area and only Kampong Chhnang district is smaller. It also has the smallest district population in the province due to its small size, flooded landscape and lack of road transport infrastructure. Two small tertiary roads run to Chol Kiri town from National Highway 6 in Batheay district in Kampong Cham province.

== Location ==
Chol Kiri district lies in the east of the province and shares a border with Kampong Thom and Kampong Cham provinces. Reading from the north clockwise, Chol Kiri borders with Kampong Leang district to the north and north west and Baray district of Kampong Thom to the north east. The eastern border of the district is shared with Batheay district of Kampong Cham province. To the south the district shares a border with Kampong Tralach district. The western border of the district joins with Rola B'ier district and Kampong Chhnang district which surrounds the provincial capital.

== Administration ==
The district is subdivided into five communes (khum) and 26 villages (phum). The Chol Kiri district governor reports to Touch Marim, the Governor of Kampong Chhnang. The following table shows the villages of Chol Kiri district by commune.

Khum (commune)	Phum (villages)
Chol Sar	Kampong Khlanh, Tonle Krau, Ruessei Dangkuoch, Preaek Trab, Kampong Ba Srov
Kaoh Thkov	Bat Trang, Kaoh Lot, Kaoh Slaeng, Peam Popech, Ta Mol Leu, Kaoh Thkov, Ta Mol Kraom, Kor Chrum, Dang Tong, Peam Chrey
Kampong Os	Kampong Ous, Kien Ta Ma, Thmei, Preaek Chhdaor, Trasek Chrum, Along Ak
Peam Chhkaok	Peam Chhkaok, Anlong Metrei, Phlong, Kbal Kanlang
Prey Kri	Prey Kri Tboung, Kaoh Thum, Prey Kri Cheung, Chum Pea, Ta Kan, Tomnob

== Demographics ==
According to the 1998 Census, the population of the district was 28,300 persons in 4,918 households in 1998. This population consisted of 13,883 males (49.1%) and 14,417 females (50.9%). With a population of under 30,000 people, Chol Kiri has by far the smallest district populations in Kampong Chhnang province. The average household size in Chol Kiri is 5.8 persons per household, which is significantly larger than the rural average for Cambodia (5.2 persons). The sex ratio in the district is 96.3%, with slightly more females than males.

== Murder over burials ==
On July 6, 2008, a farmer named Lon Chak died from axe wounds to the head in Prey Kiri village, Chol Kiri district. His uncle An Lonh confessed responsibility for the crime to local police. Lonh reported that the crime stemmed from a long-standing dispute with his nephew. The dispute between the two relatives was over burying bodies on farmland belong to Lonh. Lonh reported to police that Chak had already buried two of his relatives on the land against Lonh's wishes. After Chak buried a third body, Lonh attacked his nephew with an axe.
