= Saeb =

Saeb or SAEB may refer to:

== Saeb ==
Saeb is a masculine given name of Arabic origin. Notable people with the name include:

- Saeb Erekat (1955–2020), Palestinian official
- Saeb N. Jaroudi (1929–2014), Lebanese official
- Saeb Jendeya (born 1975), Palestinian footballer
- Saeb Salam (1905–2000), former Lebanese Prime Minister
- Saeb Shawkat (1898–1984), Iraqi surgeon
- Saeb Tabrizi or Saib Tabrizi (1592–1676), Medieval Persian poet

== SAEB ==
- BCS Professional Certification, formerly known as the Systems Analysis Examination Board
