= Tuek Chhu Falls =

Waterfall in Cambodia

Tuek Chhu Falls is a waterfall in Kampot Province, Cambodia. It is located about 5 miles (8.0 km) north-west of Kampot. It is noted for its bamboo platforms in which families sit to view the Kampot River. Tek Chhouu Zoo lies in the vicinity.
