= Kan Imam San =

Muslim sect recognized by the Cambodian government

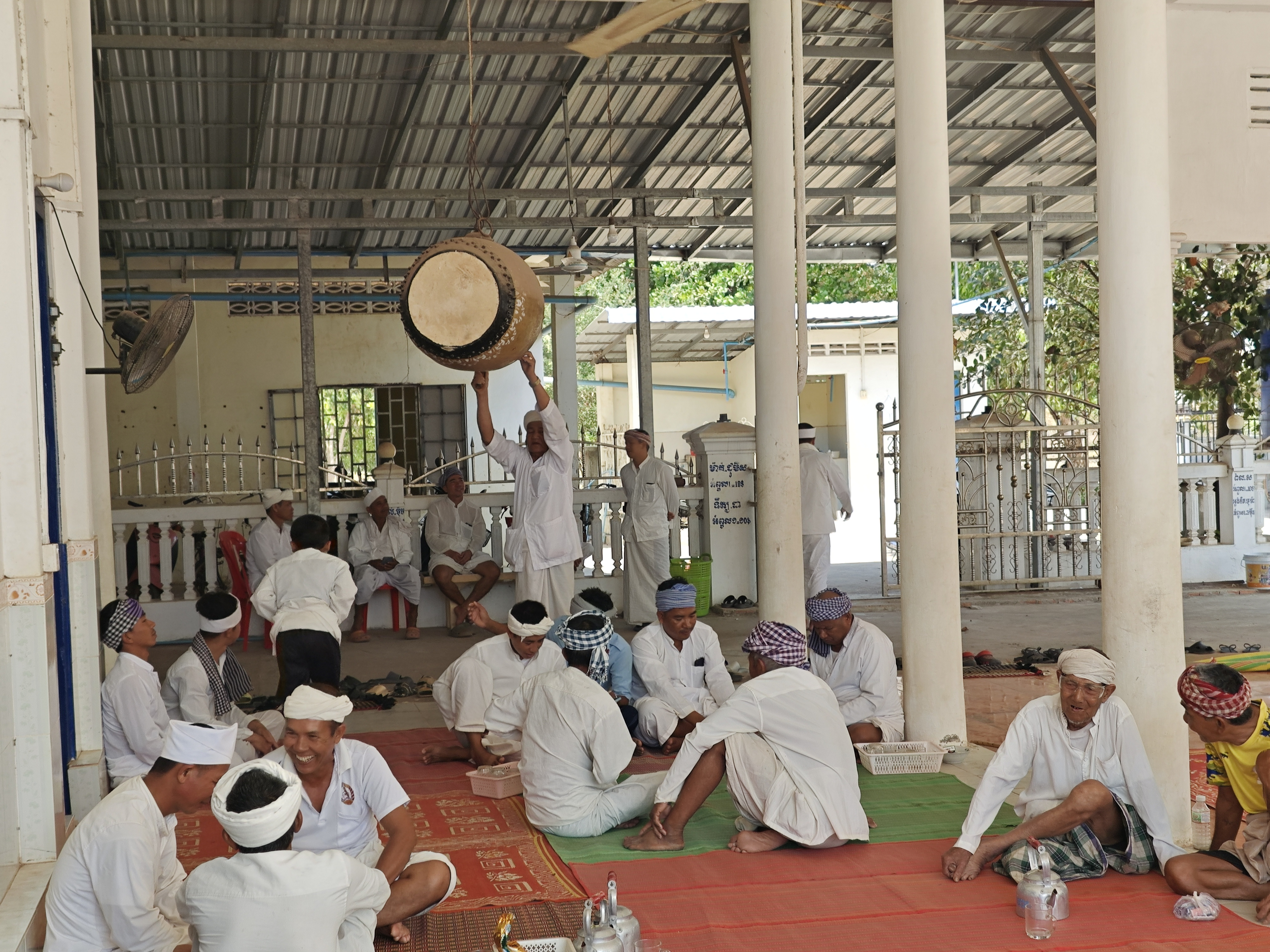
A group of Khan Imam San practitioners at the central mosque in Au Russey. A drum is beaten to signal the call to prayer.

The Kan Imam San ("San" often romanized as Sann), sometimes called the Cham Bani of Cambodia, are an Islamic sect that make up about 10% of the population of ethnic Chams in Cambodia. Their spiritual and officially recognized administrative center is the Tralach District of Kampong Chhnang Province, particularly the Au Russey (or Orussey) Mosque, but their historic mosque atop Phnom Oudong is the home to many of their most important rituals and festivals. They are also notably represented in Pursat and Battambang provinces — a geographic trace of villages following the southern side of the Tonlé Sap lake, extending northwest from the Tralach District in Kampong Chhnang — with small numbers in Kandal, Kampot, and Kratie Provinces. They are the last users of Western Cham script, which is used for their holy books as well as some signs and other text within their villages.

Internally, they often refer to themselves as the "sevens" due to only praying and visiting their mosque once a week, while referring to Sunni Muslims as "fives," referencing the five pillars of Islam. This distinction is also one of their most noteworthy characteristics, compared to the 90% of Cambodian Muslims who pray five times per day, in line with most Islamic practices around the globe.

== History ==
The Kan Imam San follow the teachings of Imam San, who lived in the mid-19th century. They were first recognized by the Cambodian government in the 19th century, when they received special privileges from King Ang Duong. He allowed them to build a mosque on Oudong Mountain, where the royal residence was located, and granted Imam San the noble title of "Oknha Khnour," combining the Khmer honorific Okhnha with the Cham word for "venerable." Imam San was reportedly buried at the mosque in Oudong, and pilgrimages are made to the site every year.

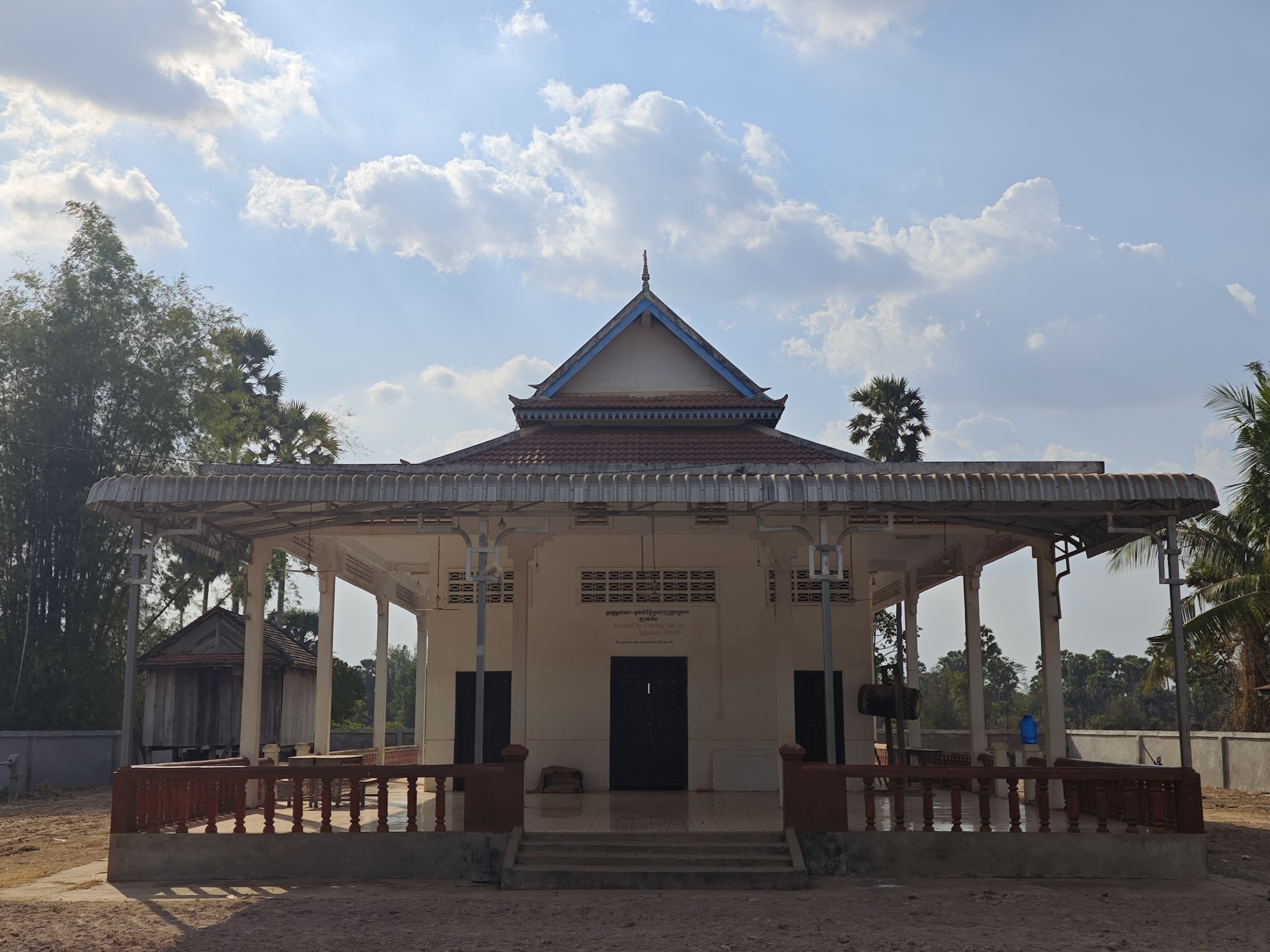
A mosque in Kan Imam San style. Note the drum hanging on the right side.

Following the death of the Imam San, the title of "Oknha Khnour" has been handed down to leaders of the Kan Imam San community. When an Oknha Khnour dies or is otherwise incapacitated, the Kan Imam San community uses thumpprints to select a successor. The chosen successor is then signed into office as Ohnha Khnour by the reigning monarch of Cambodia.

After their founding, Kan Imam San was the dominant form of Islam in Cambodia. In the second half of the 20th century, the international Muslim community began opening up Islamic schools which taught Sunni Islam. Over time, most Cambodian Muslims have moved away from Kan Imam San and became practitioners of Sunni Islam. Many families and whole villages choose to convert to Sunni Islam in order to get material benefits, such as financial aid, infrastructure projects, and educational scholarships from majority Muslim countries like Malaysia, Indonesia, and Kuwait. The conversions have threatened their community with extinction. However, many still practice Kan Imam San traditions even after officially converting.

In 1998, they were officially recognized by the Ministry of Cults and Religions as one of two Muslim groups in Cambodia.

The current Oknha Khnour, Math Sa, was signed into office by King Norodom Sihamoni succeeding the 8th Oknha Khnour, Kay Toam.

From 2011 to 2016, the US embassy provided aid to the Kan Imam San community by helping them print learning materials for their script to encourage literacy in the Western Cham script, as well as granted scholarships to select students to study English.

== Beliefs/Traditions ==
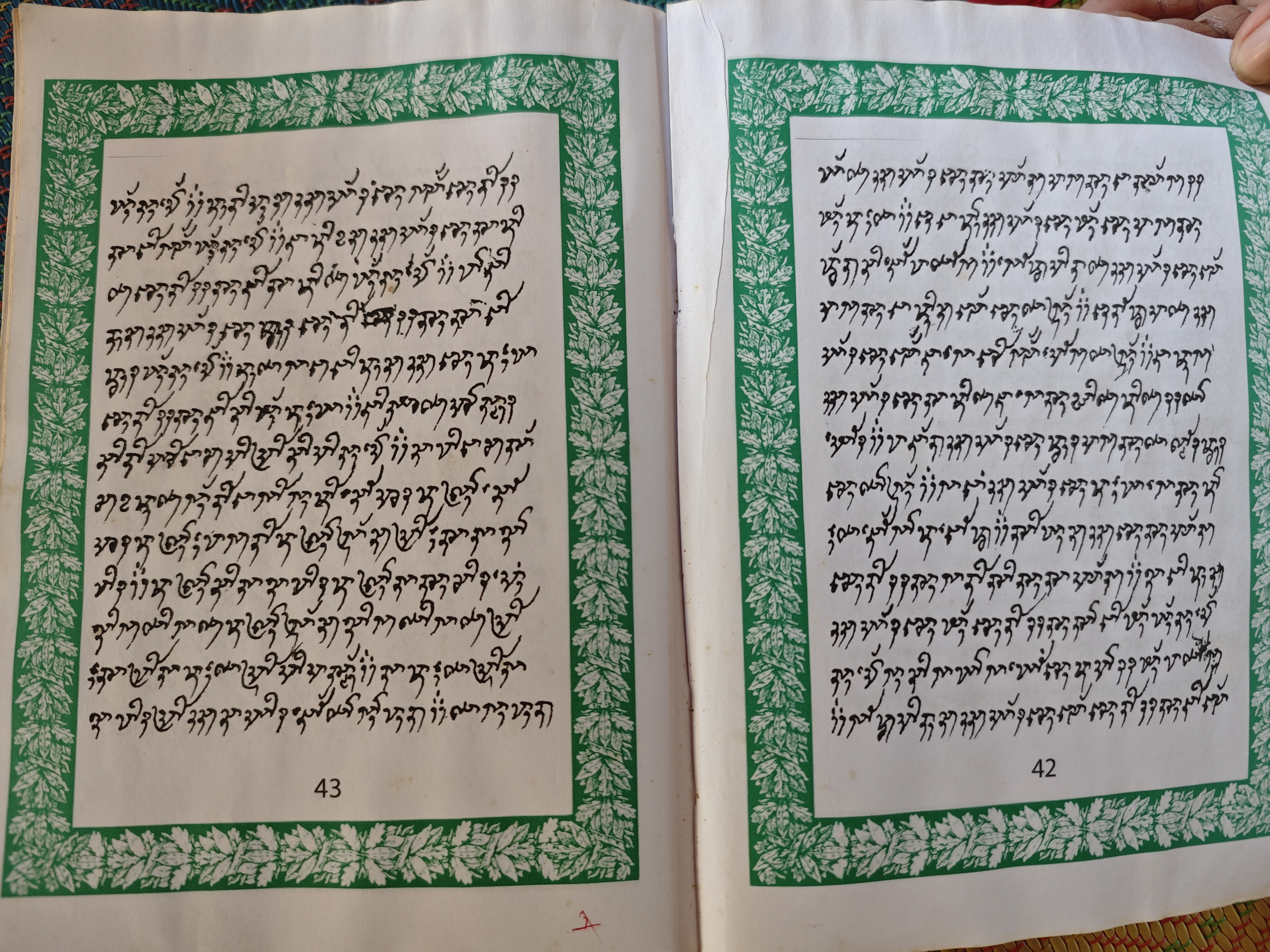
Pages from the Gheet, Kan Imam San's main holy book, written in Western Cham Script.

The Kan Imam San follow the teachings of Imam San, who is credited with having converted the Cambodian Chams to Islam in the mid-19th century. These teachings differ greatly from other Islamic sects. The Kan Imam San do not use the Quran, Hadith, or other mainstream Islamic texts. Rather, their holy book is the Gheet, which is a collection of Imam San's teachings, explanations for certain rituals, and summaries of some passages from the Quran. It is written in Cham script. They also have around 40 kitabs, or treatises, written by various scholars and handed down. They also have the Ka Buon, a set of rules for gender roles in their culture, written as two longform poems. It is a modified and translated form of the Cambodian Chbab Srey and Chbab Bros.

While the Kan Imam San avoid pork and alcohol, they do not strictly follow the rules of Halal. Most prominently, they do not observe the rituals of Dhabihah. Women are not required to cover their heads, although some choose to when going outside of the village.

Kan Imam San mosques feature a drum hanging from the ceiling, which is beaten as a call to prayer, instead of an Adhan as in most other forms of Islam.

== See also ==
- Islam in Southeast Asia
