= Ponley =

Ponley ឃុំពន្លៃ
- Commune
- Location within Cambodia
- Coordinates: 13°47′28″N 103°12′51″E
- Country: Cambodia
- Province: Banteay Meanchey
- District: Phnom Srok District
- Villages: 6
- Time zone: UTC+07
- Geocode: 010303

Ponley is a khum (commune) of Phnom Srok District in Banteay Meanchey Province in western Cambodia.

== Villages ==
- Ta Vong
- Ponley
- Svay Sa
- Svay Khmau
- Kouk Ta Sokh
- Pou Roam Bon
