= Prek Kdam Bridge =

Bridge in Cambodia

Coordinates: 11.8149°N 104.8076°E

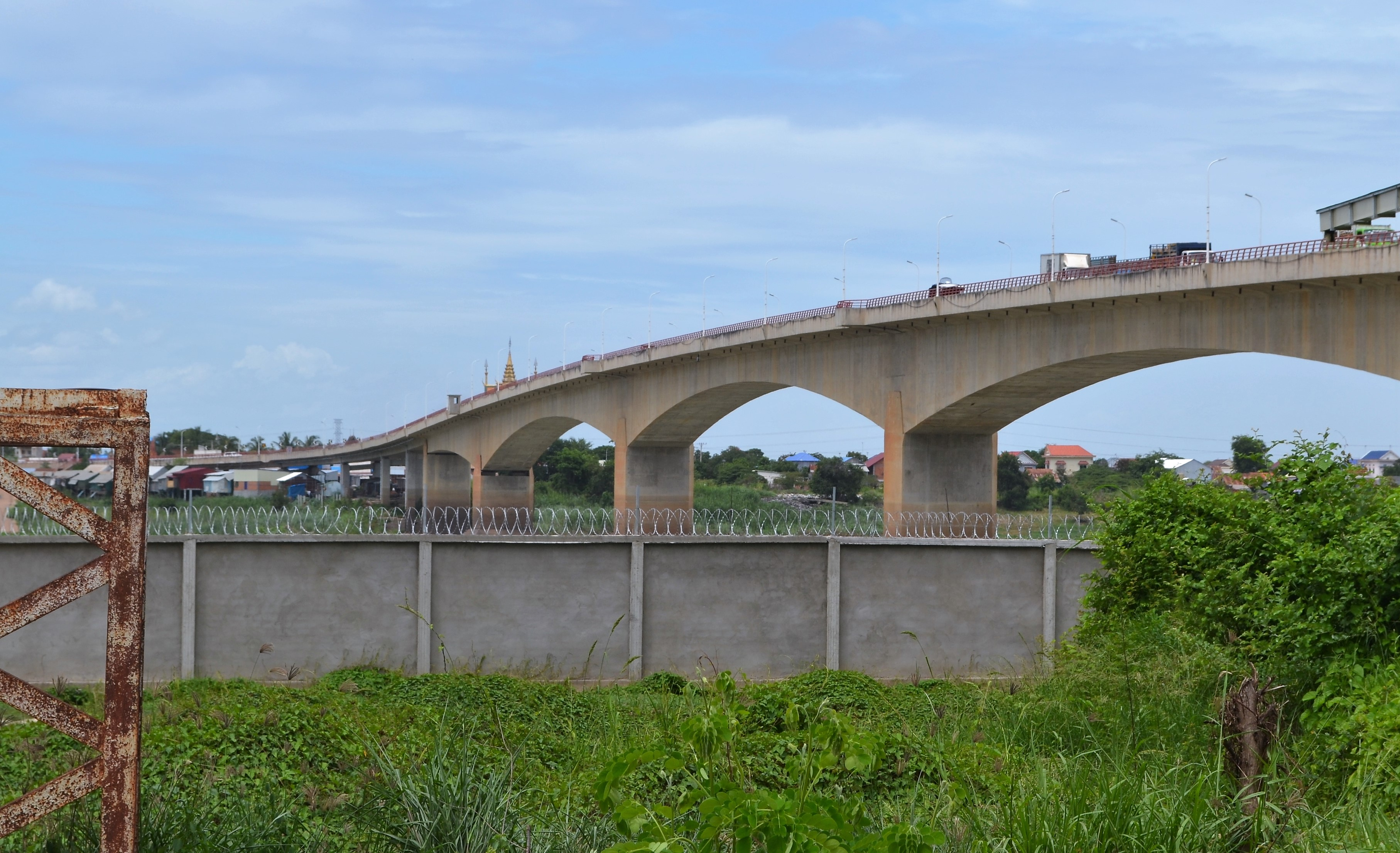
Prek Kdam Bridge

The Prek Kdam Bridge is a 981-meter bridge that crosses the Tonlé Sap River at Ponhea Lueu in Kandal Province, Cambodia.
