= Prek Pnov Bridge =

Bridge in Cambodia

Coordinates: 11.8148°N 104.8076°E

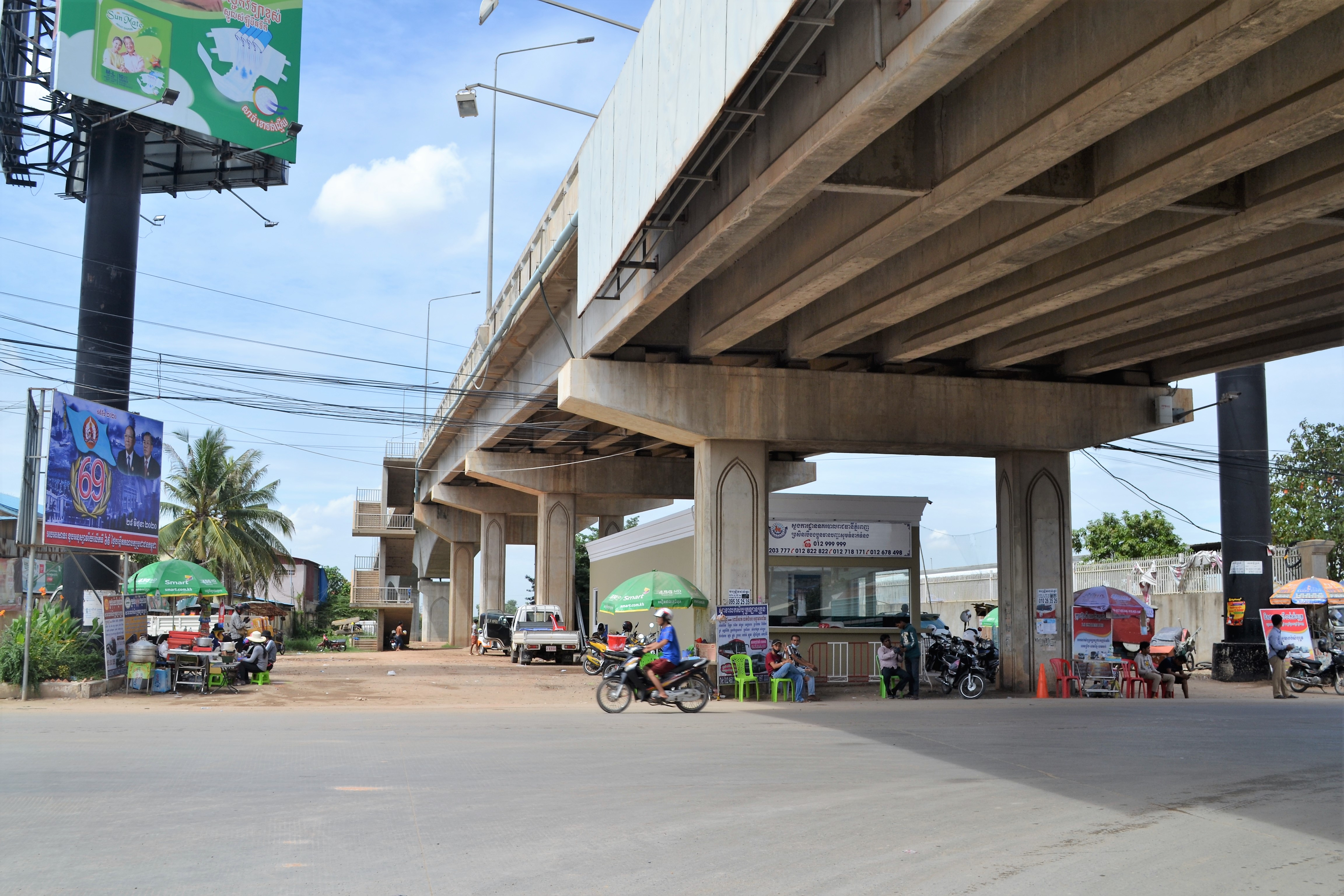
PrekPnovBrige-2020-2.jpg

The Prek Pnov Bridge is a 996 m bridge that crosses the Tonlé Sap River in the Phnom Penh province at Prek Pnov.
