= Tonle Sap River =

River in Cambodia

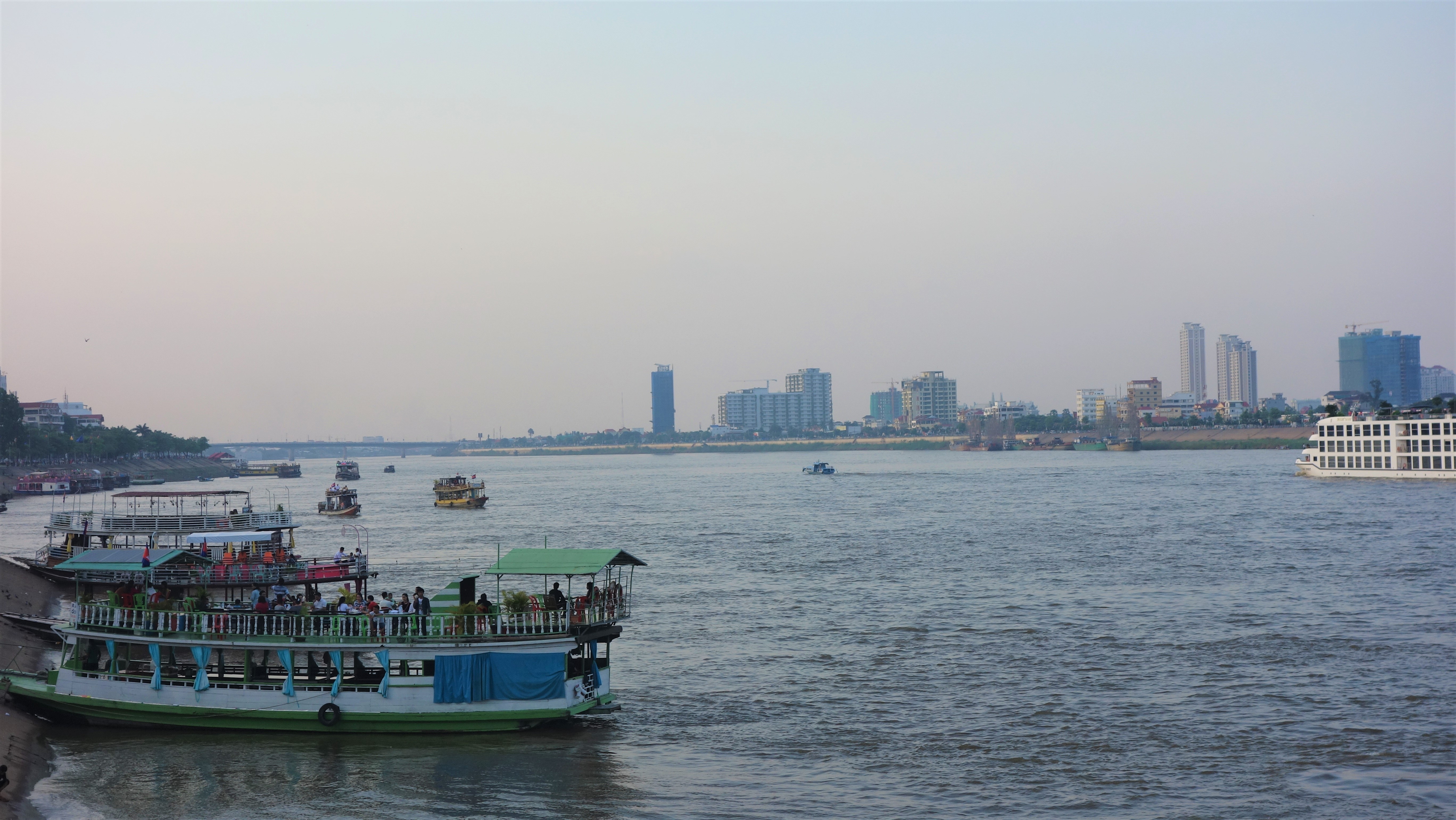
- Tonle Sap River in Phnom Penh

- Location within Cambodia
- Etymology: Fresh water river
- Native name: ទន្លេសាប (Khmer)

Location
- Country: Cambodia
- Provinces: Kampong Thom province, Kampong Chhnang province, Kampong Cham province, Kandal province, Phnom Penh

Physical characteristics
- Source: Tonle Sap
- Mouth: Mekong
  - location: Phnom Penh
  - coordinates: 11°33′48″N 104°56′20″E
- Length: 147 kilometres (91 mi)

Basin features
- Tributaries
  - left: Steung Saen River, Chinit River
- Bridges: Prek Kdam Bridge, Prek Pnov Bridge, Chroy Changvar Bridge
- Inland ports: Phnom Penh Autonomous Port

Tonle Sap (Khmer: ទន្លេសាប [tŭən.ˈlei saːp]) is a river in Cambodia that connects the Tonle Sap lake with the Mekong river. The river is known for its unusual seasonal reversal, which plays a crucial role in supporting biodiversity, sustaining local livelihoods, enhancing agricultural productivity, and contributing to the ecological, economic, and cultural vitality of the region.

== Etymology ==
In Khmer, Tonle/ទន្លេ means "river" and Sap/សាប means "fresh water". Therefore, Tonle Sap (ទន្លេសាប) is the name of the river while the lake is called "Boeng Tonle Sap" (បឹងទន្លេសាប, where Boeng/បឹង means "lake").

== Geography ==
From the lake, the Tonle Sap flows 147 kilometres (91 mi) southeast to its confluence with the Mekong river near Phnom Penh, Cambodia. During the dry season, the Mekong and Tonle Sap rivers merge, but in the monsoon season (May to October), the Mekong's floods cause the Tonle Sap river to reverse its flow. The reversal carries water, along with fish eggs and larvae, into Tonle Sap Lake, where they find a nutrient-rich environment that supports their feeding and growth.

The confluence of the Mekong, Tonle Sap, and Bassac rivers, known as Chaktomuk, holds significant ecological and economic importance for Cambodia. It is a crucial source of drinking water for around 1.5 million residents of Phnom Penh, as well as supplying water for various industrial and commercial activities. Chaktomuk also receives both treated and untreated wastewater. As a key transportation hub in the region, it accommodates a wide range of vessels, including large sea-going cargo ships, high-speed passenger boats, and small fishing boats, all of which can dock and unload goods, materials, people, and food at the Phnom Penh Autonomous Port. This port, located along the Tonle Sap river approximately 3-4 km upstream from the confluence, is an international facility managed by the Cambodian Ministry of Public Works and Transport and the Ministry of Economy and Finance.

== Culture ==
The Bon Om Touk, or Water Festival, is one of Cambodia's most prominent cultural events, celebrated annually on the Tonle Sap river. This festival marks the end of the rainy season and the reversal of the river's flow, symbolizing the start of the fishing season. The highlight of the festival is the boat races, which attract thousands of participants and spectators to Phnom Penh, particularly around the Royal Palace area. The festival celebrates the unique hydrological phenomenon of the Tonle Sap and underscores the river's importance to Cambodian culture and livelihoods.

== Impact of upstream Mekong dams ==
Concerns over the impact of upstream Mekong dams on the natural reversal of the Tonle Sap river are growing. These dams, particularly those in China and Laos, disrupt critical seasonal flooding patterns, leading to delays or failures in the river's annual reversal. This disruption causes the Tonle Sap lake to expand and contract less predictably, reducing fish stocks and agricultural productivity. Consequently, the livelihoods and food security of millions of Cambodians who depend on the lake and river are threatened. Studies indicate that this disruption diminishes floodplain fertility and alters flood dynamics, emphasizing the urgent need for sustainable water management.
