= Kampong Chhnang province =

Province of Cambodia

Kampong Chhnang Province ខេត្តកំពង់ឆ្នាំង
- Province

Khmer transcription(s)
  - Khmer: ខេត្តកំពង់ឆ្នាំង
  - UNGEGN: Khaet Kǎmpǒng Chhnăng
  - ALA-LC: Khett Kaṃbáng Chnāṃng
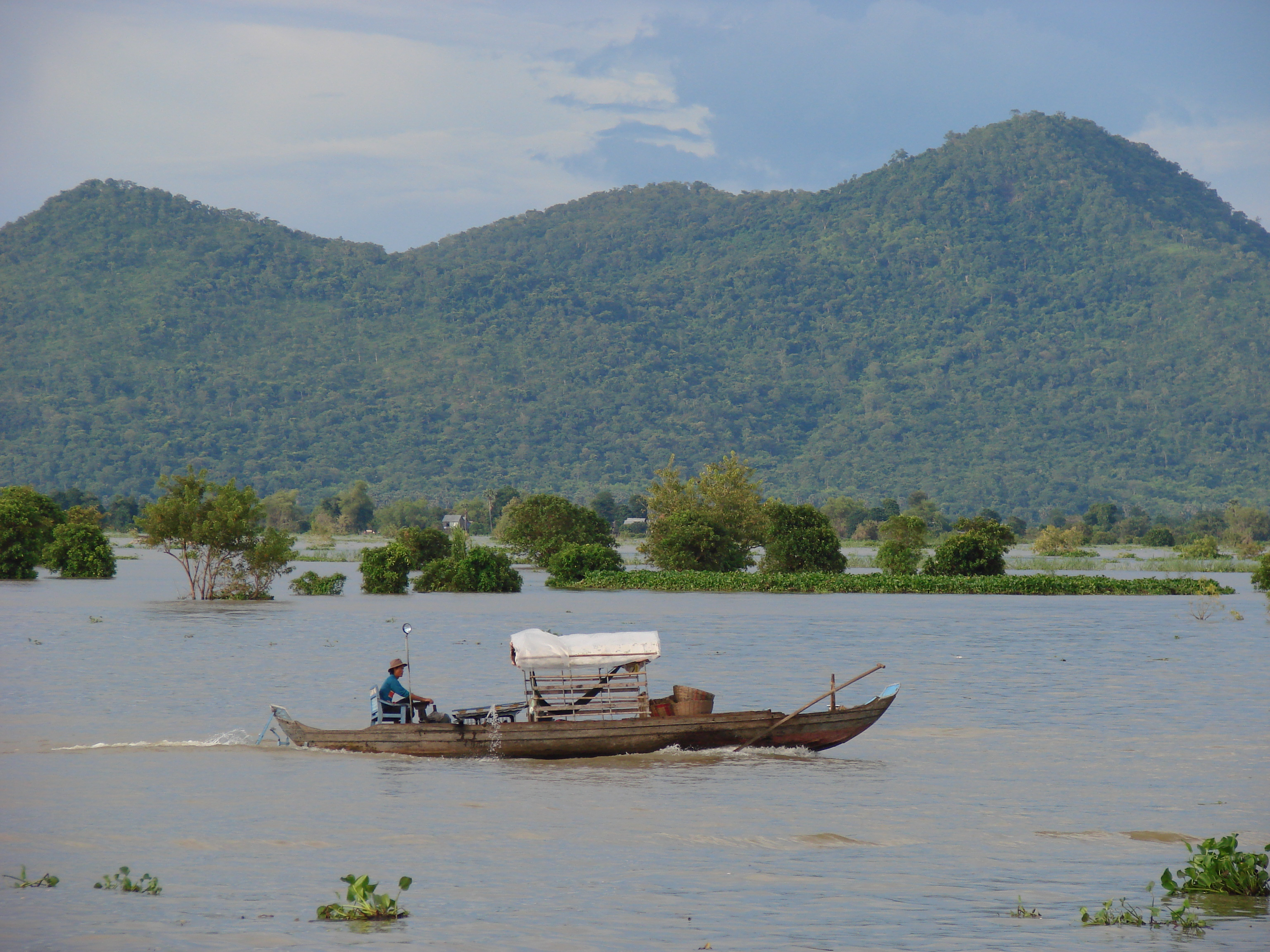
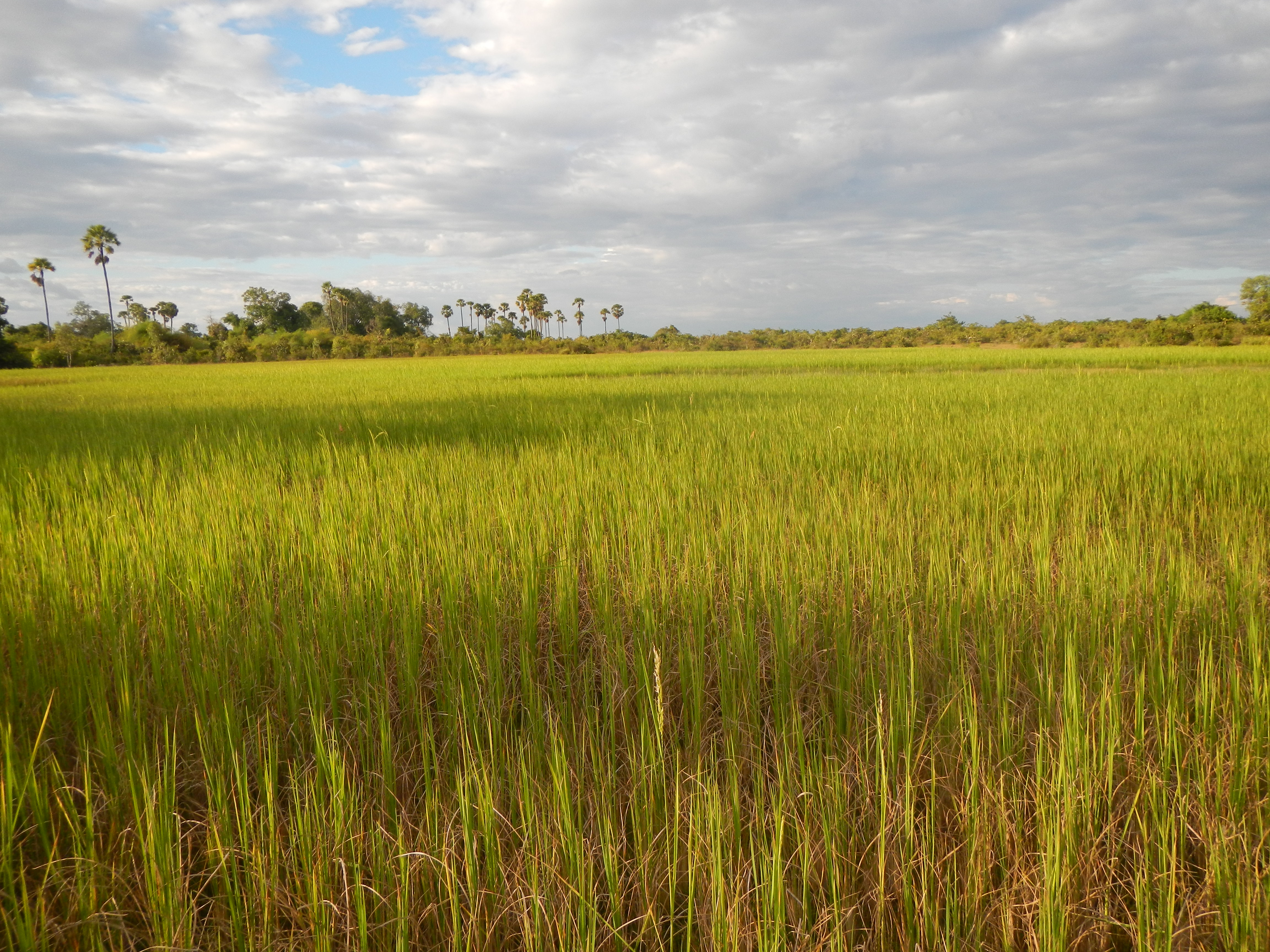
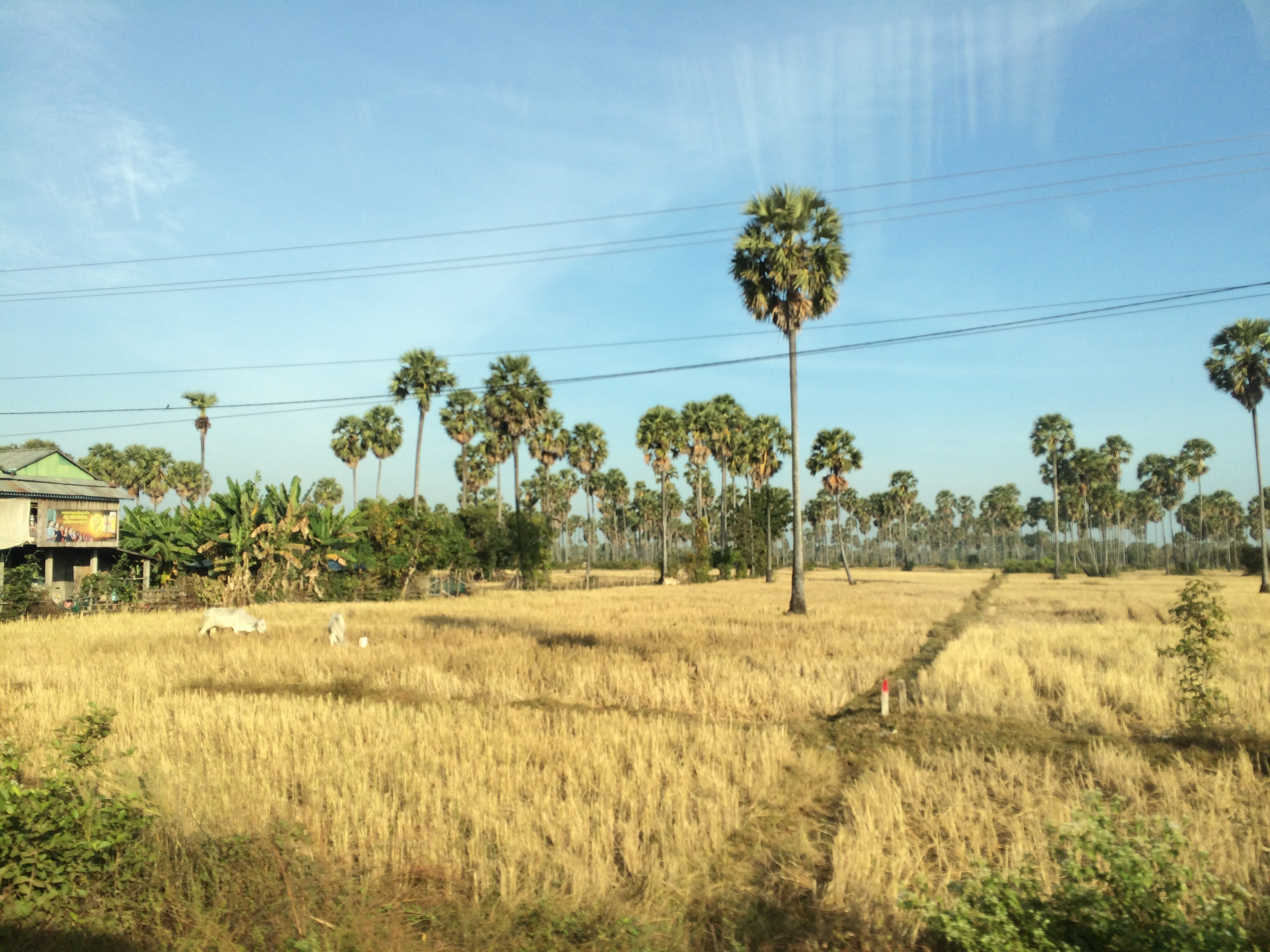
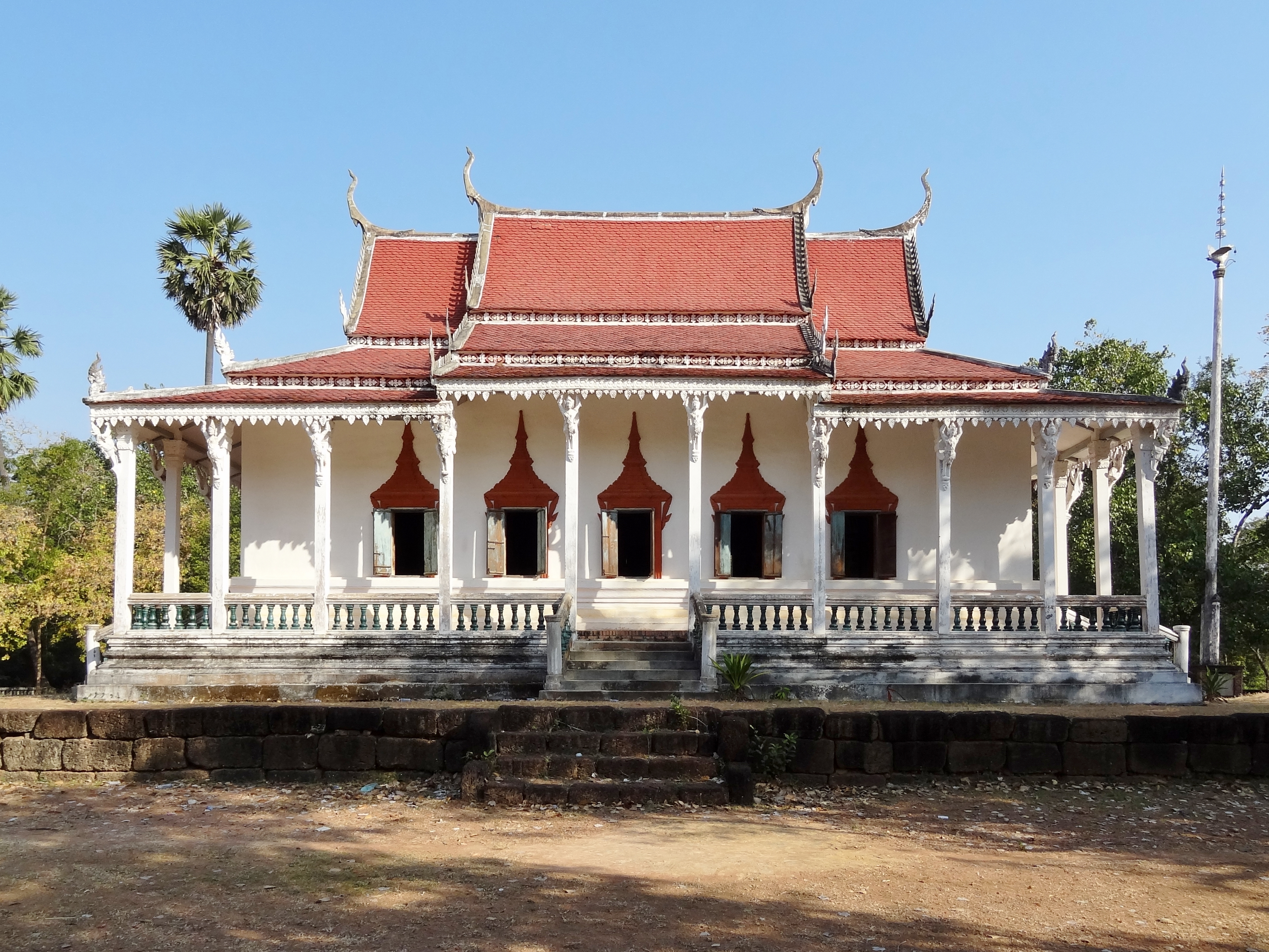
- From top, clockwise: Kangrei Mountain, rural countryside, Wat Kampong Tralach Leu, paddy field

- Seal

- Coordinates: 11°N 106°E
- Country: Cambodia
- Provincial status: 1907
- Capital: Kampong Chhnang
- Subdivisions: 7 districts; 1 municipality

Government
  - Type: Province
  - Governor: Sun Sovannarith (CPP)
  - Deputy Governor: Srun Samit
  - National Assembly: 4 / 125

Area
  - Total: 5,521 km^{2} (2,132 sq mi)
  - Rank: 14th

Population (2024)
  - Total: ▲604,895
  - Rank: 14th
  - Density: 95/km^{2} (250/sq mi)
  - Rank: 14th
- Time zone: UTC+7 (ICT)
- ISO 3166 code: KH-4
- Website: www.kampongchhnang.gov.kh

Kampong Chhnang Province (Khmer: ខេត្តកំពង់ឆ្នាំង, Khaet Kǎmpǒng Chhnăng, [lkɑm.pɔŋ cʰnaŋ]; lit. 'pottery port') is one of the central provinces of Cambodia. Neighboring provinces are (from north clockwise) Kampong Thom, Kampong Cham, Kandal, Kampong Speu, and Pursat. The provincial capital is the city of Kampong Chhnang.

== Etymology ==
The name translates from Khmer literally to Port of Pottery. Archaeological remains from the area have revealed among many other findings artifacts from Dvaravati, a former kingdom in what later is Thailand, dating to the 6th through 11th centuries.

== Geography ==
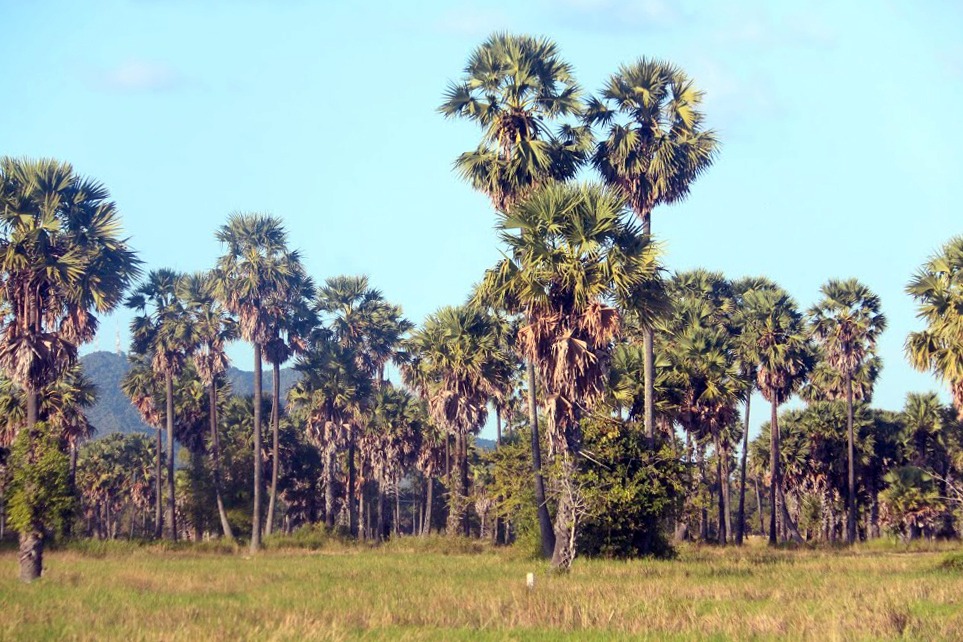
Group of palm trees in Kampong Chhnang province

Kampong Chhnang is a small province 91 kilometres (57 mi) from Phnom Penh. It is in the alluvial plain of central Cambodia and is drained by the Tonle Sap, a tributary of the Mekong river. The capital city of Phnom Penh has grown until it actually encompasses the provincial border of Kampong Chhnang.

== Religion ==
Religion in Kampong Chhnang province (2019 census)
1. Buddhism (93.1%)
2. Islam (5.80%)
3. Christianity (0.30%)
4. Animism and Other religions (0.90%)

The state religion is Theravada Buddhism. More than 93.1% of the people in Kampong Chhnang province are Buddhists. About 5.8% population of Kampong Chhnang province follow Islam followed by Chams. Christianity is followed by 0.3% in the province, then animism or other religions followed by 0.9%.

Kampong Chhnang is the main center for the Kan Imam San religious community, a type of Islam practiced exclusively by some Chams in isolated communities in Cambodia. There are 16 Kan Imam San villages in Kampong Chhnang province. The leaders of the community live and pray near Kampong Tralech.

== Administrative divisions ==
The province is subdivided into 7 districts and 1 municipality. The districts are further subdivided into 65 communes (khum) and 478 villages (phum). There is one city and 14 townships. There are also 102 khum administrative organizations (KAO).

ISO code	District	Khmer	Population (2019)
04-01	Baribo	ស្រុកបរិបូណ៌	55,371
04-02	Chol Kiri	ស្រុកជលគីរី	31,322
04-03	Kampong Chhnang Municipality	ក្រុងកំពង់ឆ្នាំង	41,080
04-04	Kampong Leng	ស្រុកកំពង់លែង	44,066
04-05	Kampong Tralach	ស្រុកកំពង់ត្រឡាច	99,356
04-06	Rolea Bier	ស្រុករលាប្អៀរ	103,219
04-07	Samakki Meanchey	ស្រុកសាមគ្គីមានជ័យ	81,197
04-08	Teuk Phos	ស្រុកទឹកផុស	62,287
