= Kampong Chhnang (city) =

Kampong Chhnang កំពង់ឆ្នាំង
- City
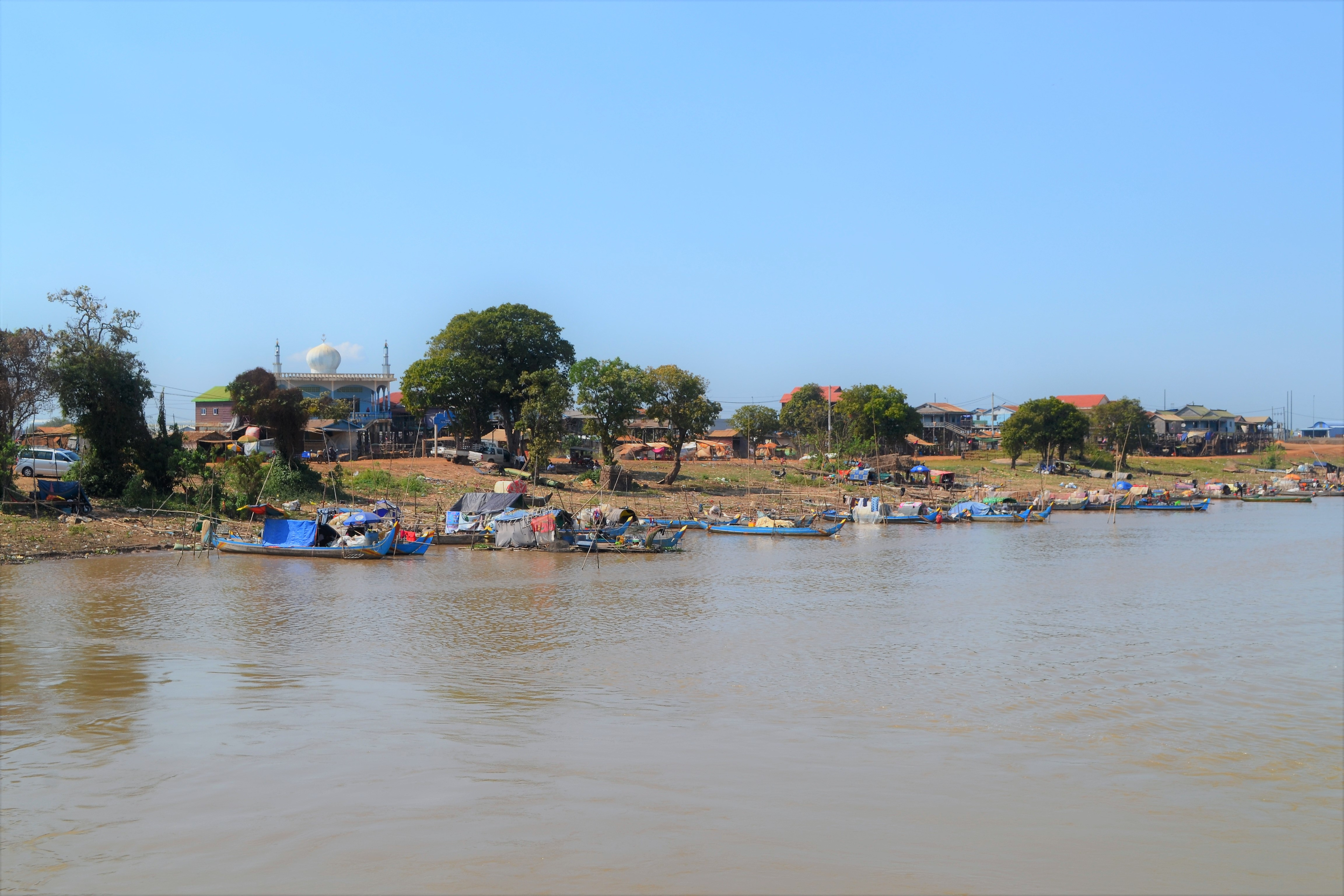
- Tonlé Sap River bank in the city of Kampong Chhnang

- Location within Cambodia
- Coordinates: 12°15′N 104°40′E
- Country: Cambodia
- Province: Kampong Chhnang
- Municipality: Kampong Chhnang

Population (2019)
  - Total: 41,080
- Time zone: UTC+7 (ICT)

Kampong Chhnang (Khmer: កំពង់ឆ្នាំង [kɑmpɔŋ cʰnaŋ]) is the capital city of Kampong Chhnang Province, in central Cambodia.

It is located just west of the Tonlé Sap River and is a noted port. The small city is connected to Phnom Penh by a national highway route and railway. Phnom Kong Rei is a landmark located north of the city across the Tonle Sap River.

The economy of the area is dominated by rice production. Until recently, many locals lived in floating fishing villages during the high-water monsoon season. The last of these floating villages was dismantled at the end of 2022.

== Climate ==
Climate data for Kampong Chhnang (1982–2024)
Month	Jan	Feb	Mar	Apr	May	Jun	Jul	Aug	Sep	Oct	Nov	Dec	Year
Mean daily maximum °C (°F)	31.6 (88.9)	31.9 (89.4)	32.8 (91.0)	34.0 (93.2)	34.3 (93.7)	33.9 (93.0)	33.7 (92.7)	32.4 (90.3)	31.3 (88.3)	30.9 (87.6)	31.1 (88.0)	30.0 (86.0)	32.3 (90.2)
Mean daily minimum °C (°F)	20.0 (68.0)	20.8 (69.4)	21.4 (70.5)	21.7 (71.1)	22.0 (71.6)	22.3 (72.1)	21.9 (71.4)	22.3 (72.1)	22.4 (72.3)	22.3 (72.1)	22.0 (71.6)	21.1 (70.0)	21.7 (71.0)
Average precipitation mm (inches)	20.2 (0.80)	28.3 (1.11)	50.2 (1.98)	98.1 (3.86)	156.4 (6.16)	219.2 (8.63)	227.8 (8.97)	281.8 (11.09)	303.6 (11.95)	282.5 (11.12)	125.7 (4.95)	0.4 (0.02)	1,794.2 (70.64)
Source: World Meteorological Organization
