= Ang Trapeang Thma =

Protected area in Cambodia

- IUCN category III (natural monument or feature)
- Location within Cambodia
- Location: Banteay Meanchey Province, Cambodia
- Nearest city: Serei Saophoan
- Coordinates: 13.86876567°N 103.30130525°E
- Area: 126.50 km^{2} (48.84 sq mi)
- Established: First protected January 1999, became Protected Landscape in May 2016
- Governing body: Ministry of Agriculture, Forestry and Fisheries / Forest Administration

Ang Trapeang Thma Protected Landscape (Khmer: អាងត្រពាំងថ្ម [ʔaːŋ trɑːpeaŋ tʰmɑː]) is a 126.50 km^{2} (48.84 sq mi) protected area in northwestern Cambodia that was first established in 1999 and converted to a protected landscape in 2016. The reserve was set aside to protect the rare eastern sarus crane (Grus antigone sharpii). Prior to the discovery of the crane at Trapeang Thma, there were thought to be fewer than 1,000 of the birds left alive in the world.

== Location and access ==
The crane sanctuary is located in north western Cambodia, not far from the border with Thailand. The entire 10,000 hectares of the protected area is contained within Phnom Srok District of Banteay Meanchey Province. Phnom Srok district shares a border with Siem Reap and Oddar Meanchey Provinces. Reading from the north clockwise, Phnom Srok borders with Banteay Ampil and Chong Kal districts of Oddar Meanchey province to the north. The eastern border of the district is shared with Srei Snam and Kralanh districts of Siem Reap province. To the south the district shares a border with Preah Net Preah District of Banteay Meanchey. The western border of the district joins with Svay Chek and Thma Puok districts also of Banteay Meanchey. The sanctuary can be accessed by road from Sisophon (70 km) or Siem Reap (city) (90 km) via National Highway 6 initially then via smaller unsealed district roads to Ang Trapeang Thma.

== History ==
The site of Ang Trapeang Thma reservoir is also the site of an ancient Angkorian causeway.

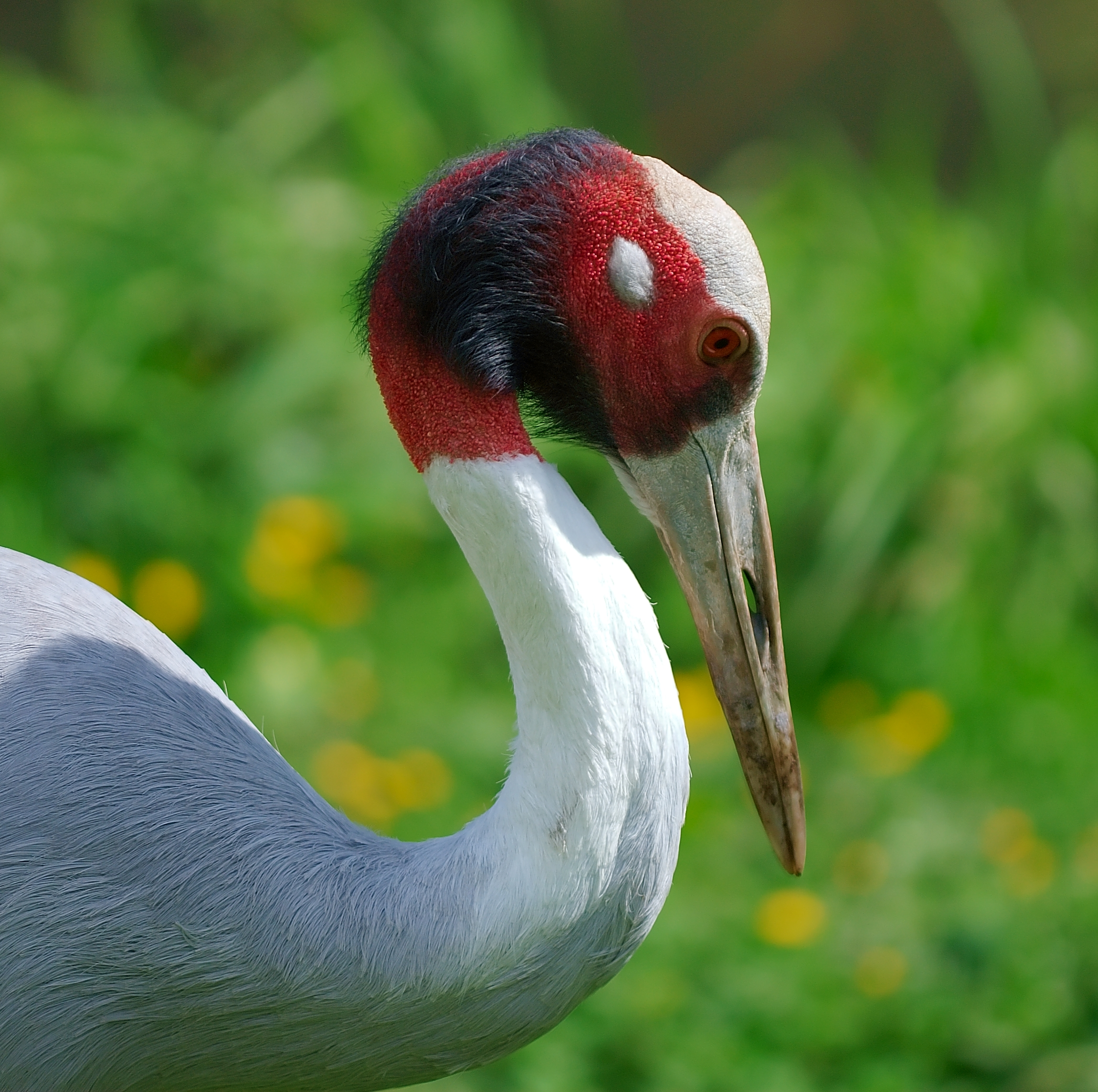
The sarus crane

== Sarus crane ==
The sarus crane, Grus antigone is an all-year resident breeding bird in northern Pakistan and India (especially Central India and the Gangetic plains), Nepal, Southeast Asia and Queensland, Australia. It is a very large crane, averaging 156 cm (5 ft) in length, which is found in freshwater marshes and plains.

== Other fauna ==
Ang Trapeang Thma sanctuary is also an important conservation area for a number of other globally threatened species. The long tailed macaque (Macaca fascicularis), Eld's deer (Rucervus eldii), Amboina box turtle (Cuora amboinensis), Malayan snail-eating turtle (Malayemys macrocephala), and the elongated tortoise (Indotestudo elongata) can be found within Ang Trapeang Thma.
