= Phnom Srok district =

Phnom Srok ស្រុកភ្នំស្រុក
- District (srok)
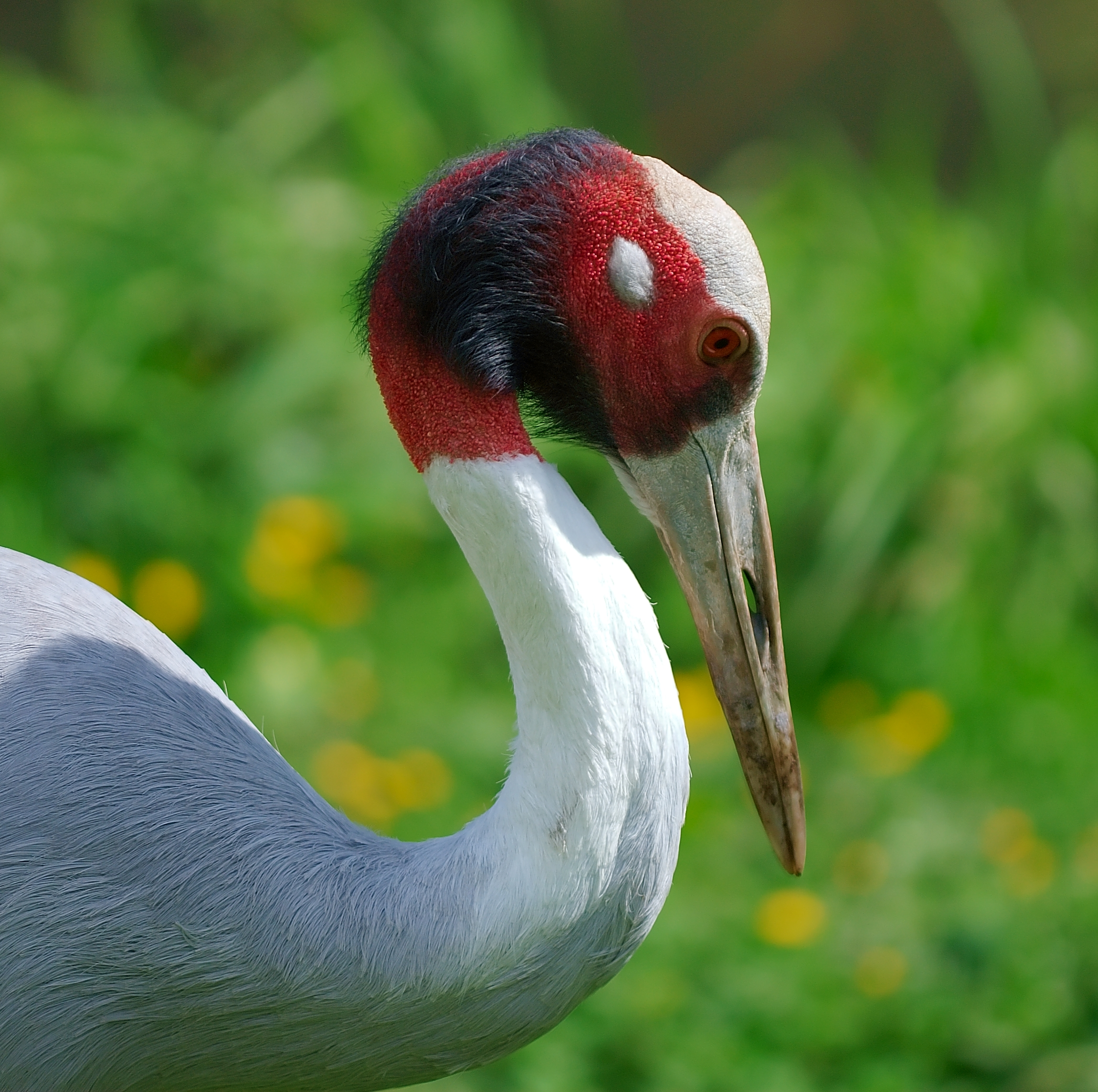
- The sarus crane

- Map showing the location of the district within Banteay Meanchey Province.

- Location in Cambodia
- Coordinates: 13°47′N 103°10′E
- Country: Cambodia
- Province: Banteay Meanchey
- Communes: 6
- Villages: 55

Government
  - Governor: Mr. Kim Chhoung

Population (2008)
  - Total: 46,395
- Time zone: +7
- Geocode: 0103

Phnom Srok (Khmer: ស្រុកភ្នំស្រុក, lit. 'The Hillside District') is a district (srok) in the east of Banteay Meanchey province, in north-western Cambodia. The district capital is Phnom Srok town located around 52 kilometres north east of the provincial capital of Sisophon by road. Phnom Srok district is the easternmost district of Banteay Meanchey. The district shares a border with both Siem Reap province and Oddar Meanchey province to the east. There are no major roads within the district and it is quite isolated.

The district can be accessed by road from Sisophon (52 km) or Siem Reap (city) (70 km). Though there are no major roads, numerous tertiary roads run through from the district centre to the nearby districts of Kralanh, Chong Kal, Svay Chek and Preah Net Preah. The district encompasses significant wetlands and the large Democratic Kampuchea era reservoir of Ang Trapaing Thmor. Due to its relative isolation, these wetlands are home to numerous rare and endangered bird species and 10,000 hectares within the district has been declared a nature reserve for the preservation of these species.

== Ang Trapeang Thma ==
Located in the centre of the district, the Ang Trapaing Thmor Crane Sanctuary is a protected area which was gazetted on 1 January 1999. The sanctuary covers an area of 10,250 hectares and is found at 13° 52' 7"N, 103° 18' 4"E. The reserve was set aside to protect the rare eastern sarus crane (Grus antigone sharpii). Prior to the discovery of the crane at Trapaing Thmor, there were thought to be fewer than 1,000 of the birds left alive in the world.

== Location ==
Phnom Srok district lies in the east of the province and shares a border with Siem Reap and Oddar Meanchey Provinces. Reading from the north clockwise, Phnom Srok borders with Banteay Ampil and Chong Kal districts of Oddar Meanchey province to the north. The eastern border of the district is shared with Srei Snam and Kralanh districts of Siem Reap province. The Sreng River also forms part of the district boundary towards the east. To the south the district shares a border with Preah Net Preah district of Banteay Meanchey. The western border of the district joins with Svay Chek and Thmor Pouk districts also of Banteay Meanchey.

== Administration ==
Mr. Yim Samnang is the Governor of Phnom Srok district. He reports to Um Reatrey, the Governor of Banteay Meanchey. The following table shows the villages of Phnom Srok district by commune.

Khum (communes)	Phum (villages)
Nam Tau	Rongvean, Thmei Khang Tboung, Thmei Khang Cheung, Kouk Yeang, Kouk Chas, Chrab, Kantuot, Nam Tau, Pongro, Samraong, Khnang, Thnong Khang Tboung, Thnong Khang Cheung, Slaeng, Ta Kong, Yeang Otdam, Ampel Kaong, Kung Seim
Poy Char	Paoy Snuol, Paoy Char, Trapeang Thma Tboung, Trapeang Thma Cheung, Trapeang Thma Kandal, Paoy Ta Ong, Sambuor, Pongro
Phnum Dei	Phnom Dei, Ponley, Kouk Seh, Thnal Dach, Bos Sbov, Trapeang Prei, Kamping Puoy, Spean Kmeng, Trang, Khchay
Ponley	Ta Vong, Ponley, Svay Sa, Svay Khmau, Kouk Ta Sokh, Pou Roam Bon
Spean Sraeng	Rouk, Mukh Chhneang, Spean, Kouk Char, Kandaol, Pongro
Srah Chik	Moat Srah, Srah Chhuk Khang Lech, Srah Chik, Kouk Kraol, Kouk Rumchek, Kouk Ta Reach, Kandal Khang Lech, Kandal Khang Kaeut, Srah Chhuk Khang Kaeut

== Demographics ==
The district is subdivided into 6 communes (khum) and 55 villages (phum). According to the 1998 Census, the population of the district was 45,251 persons in 8,675 households in 1998. This population consisted of 21,768 males (48.1%) and 23,483 females (51.9%). With a population of over 45,000 people, Phnom Srok has one of the smallest district populations in Banteay Meanchey Province. Only Malai district is smaller. The average household size in Phnom Srok is 5.2 persons per household, which is exactly the same as the rural average for Cambodia (5.2 persons). The sex ratio in the district is 92.7%, with slightly more females than males.
