= Thma Puok district =

Thma Puok ស្រុកថ្មពួក
- District (srok)
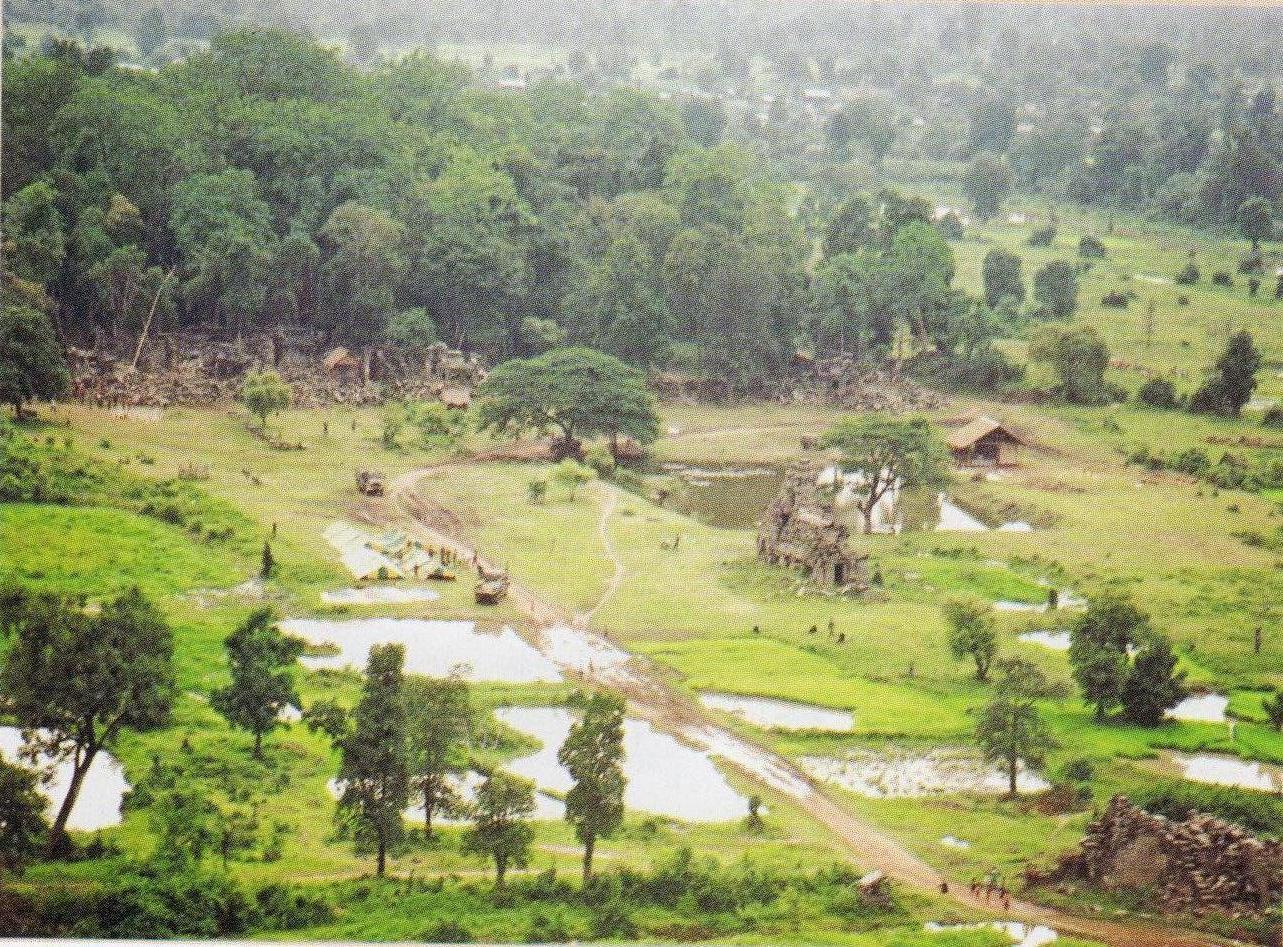
- Part of the Banteay Chhmar site

- Map showing the location of the district within Banteay Meanchey Province.

- Location in Cambodia
- Coordinates: 13°45′N 103°0′E
- Country: Cambodia
- Province: Banteay Meanchey
- Communes: 6
- Villages: 62

Population (2008)
  - Total: 61,189
- Time zone: +7
- Geocode: 0107

Thma Puok (Khmer: ស្រុកថ្មពួក, lit. 'The Crumbled Stone') is a district (Srok) in the north of Banteay Meanchey province, in north-western Cambodia. The district capital is Thma Puok town located around 42 kilometres north of the provincial capital of Sisophon by road. The district shares a border with Thailand to the west and Oddar Meanchey province to the north east. No national highway runs through the district but national road 56 from Sisophon to Samraong in Oddar Meanchey province crosses the district from north to south. The district is home to the large temple complex of Banteay Chhmar. The temple was built in the late 12th or early 13th century by Jayavarman VII and is a modest tourist destination.

The district is easily accessed by road from Sisophon (42 km), Battambang (city) (110 km), Siem Reap (city) (144 km) and Samraong (71 km). Thma Puok district is the largest districts in Banteay Meanchey province by land area but has a relatively small population due to its isolation. Large parts of the district, especially in the north west towards Thailand, are largely unpopulated. There is one official border crossing with Thailand in Kouk Romiet commune. One provincial road begins at the border and runs south east through the district to an intersection at Sarongk in Svay Chek district. Another provincial road runs north from Banteay Chmar commune on National Road 56 to Banteay Ampil district in Oddar Meanchey province. Numerous smaller roads also run to the Thai border in the north western part of the district.

== Banteay Chhmar ==
Thma Puok is home to the gigantic temple complex of Banteay Chhmar. The temple was commissioned in the 12th Century by Jayavarman VII in honour of four army generals and his son, the Crown Prince Indravarman. The temple complex covers over 500,000 feet (46,500 square meters) and due to its remote location near the Thai border has been a target of significant looting since the 1980s. In the past looters have dismantled entire walls of the temple to remove the carvings and bas reliefs. These treasures are then sold in the illegal antiquities black market.

== Location ==
Thma Puok district lies in the far north of the province and shares a border with Sa Kaeo province of Thailand. Reading from the north clockwise, Thma Puok borders with Amphoe Ta Phraya of Thailand to the north west and Banteay Ampil district of Oddar Meanchey to the north east. The eastern border of the district is shared with Phnom Srok district. To the south, the district shares a border with Svay Chek district. The western border of the district also joins with Ta Phraya district of Sa Kaeo province in Thailand.

== Administration ==
The Thma Puok district governor reports to Oung Ouen, the Governor of Banteay Meanchey. The following table shows the villages of Thma Puok district by commune.

Khum (commune)	Phum (villages)
Banteay Chhmar	Kouk Samraong, Kbal Tonsaong, Banteay Chhmar Cheung, Kbal Krabei, Banteay Chhmar Tboung, Banteay Chhmar Lech, Thma Daekkeh, Thlok, Kouk Samraong Kaeut, Kouk Samraong Lech, Srah Chrey, Dang Raek, Prasat Tbaeng, Prey Sangha, Trapeang Thlok
Kouk Romiet	Kouk Prech, Srae L'a, Kouk Romiet, Sdau, Thmei, Ta Lei, Sereika, Ta Song, Trapeang Samraong, Thnal Bambaek, Thma Chhatr, Voa Preng, Pram Minea, Sameakki, Banteay Mean Rit, Spean, Kandaol, Kdeb Thma, Boeng Ta Srei, Boeng Sokram, Ta Mang
Phum Thmei	Kab Chaor, Kouk Svay, Rolum Chrey, Thmei Khang Lech, Thmei Kandal, Thmei Khang Tboung, Totea
Thma Puok	Thma Puok, Neak Ta, Voat Chas, Kasen, Svay, Thnal Dach, Anlong Trach
Kouk Kakthen	Deu, Sdau, Treas, Kouk Kakthen, Ta Siev, Chonleas Dai, Ta Trai, Preah Chhor, Kouk Khpos
Kumru	Andoung Khlong, Kumru, Ta Yueng, Aekakpheap, Phsar Thmei, Svay Chrum, Prey Veng

== Demographics ==
The district is subdivided into 6 communes (khum) and 62 villages (phum). According to the 1998 Census, the population of the district was 53,536 persons in 10,860 households in 1998. This population consisted of 26,591 males (49.7%) and 26,945 females (50.3%). With a population of around 50,000 people, Thma Puok has one of the smaller district populations in Banteay Meanchey province. The average household size in Thma Puok is 4.9 persons per household, which is slightly smaller than the rural average for Cambodia (5.2 persons). The sex ratio in the district is 98.7%, with similar numbers of females and males.
