= Kouk Samraong =

- Village (Phumi)
- Location within Cambodia
- Coordinates: 14°5′N 103°29′E
- Country: Cambodia
- Province: Banteay Meanchey
- District: Thma Puok
- Commune: Banteay Chhmar

Population (1998)
  - Total: 503

Kouk Samraong is a village in the commune of Banteay Chhmar in Thma Puok District in Banteay Meanchey Province in north-western Cambodia.

== Demographics ==
In 1998 it had a population of 503 people; 249 male, 254 female.
