= Svay Chek district =

Svay Chek ស្រុកស្វាយចេក
- District (srok)
- Map showing the location of the district within Banteay Meanchey Province.

- Location in Cambodia
- Coordinates: 13°40′N 103°0′E
- Country: Cambodia
- Province: Banteay Meanchey
- Communes: 8
- Villages: 63

Government
  - អភិបាល: លឿង សុភក្តិ

Population (2008)
  - Total: 55,596
- Time zone: +7
- Geocode: 0108

Svay Chek (Khmer: ស្រុកស្វាយចេក, lit. 'The Purple Banana') is a district (srok) in the north of Banteay Meanchey province, in north-western Cambodia. The district capital is Svay Chek town located around 22 kilometres north of the provincial capital of Sisophon by road. The district shares a border with Thailand to the west. No national highway runs through the district but national road 56 from Sisophon to Samraong in Oddar Meanchey province crosses the district from north to south.

The district is easily accessed by road from Sisophon (22 km) Battambang (city) (90 km) and Siem Reap (city) (124 km). Svay Chek district is one of the smaller districts in Banteay Meanchey province and also has the smallest population after Malai and Phnom Srok. The western half of the district towards Thailand is largely unpopulated. There are no official border crossings in the district but one provincial road begins near Phnom Srok and crosses the district to end at the Thai border. Numerous smaller roads also run to the Thai border in the western half of the district.

== The K5 Plan ==
The western part of Svay Chek district is part of the heavily mined K5 belt which lies just inside the Cambodian border with Thailand. The K5 minefield is 700 kilometres long and 400– 500 metres wide. It runs along the Thai Cambodian border.

== Location ==
Svay Chek district lies in the north of the province and shares a border with Sa Kaeo province of Thailand. Reading from the north clockwise, Svay Chek borders with Thma Pouk district to the north. The eastern border of the district is shared with Phnom Srok district in the north east and Preah Netr Preah in the south east. To the south the district shares a border with Serei Saophoan and Ou Chrov districts. The western border of the district joins with Khok Sung district of Sa Kaeo province in Thailand.

== Administration ==
The Svay Chek district governor reports to Oung Ouen, the Governor of Banteay Meanchey. The following table shows the villages of Svay Chek district by commune.

Khum (commune)	Phum (villages)
Phkoam	Phkoam, Yeang Vien, Yeang, Ampil, Ou, Prasat Vien, Ta Duol, Svay Sa, Mau, Thma Koul, Ta Kul
Roluos	Baek Chan Thmei, Khvav Kaeut, Stueng, Ta Ong Kaeut, Slaeng, Roluos, Ta Sman
Sarongk	Pheas Tboung, Pheas Cheung, Chrung, Phlas Kang, Kouk Phlu, Kantrong
Sla Kram	Sla Kram, Kakaoh, Kamnab, Toap Siem, Khlaeng Poar Akphivoat, Prasat, Kouk Ampil, khlaeng Poar
Svay Chek	Kouk Khvav, Ponsay Cheung, Kloeng, Baek Chan Chas, Ponsay Tboung, Roka Thmei, Ta Ong Lech, Slaeng, Thmei, Khvav Lech, Samraong, Chamkar Kor, Damnak Kokos, Lboek Svay
Ta Baen	Kouk Ta Aek, Ou Veaeng, Ta Baen, Kouk Roka, Ou Veaeng Tboung
Ta Phou	Ta Phou, Pongro, Ta Srei, Prech Kei, Kouk Kei, Khmoas, Thmei, Baray, Phchoek, Prech Tboung, Bantoat Baoh
Treas	Thmei, Chaeng, Doun Nouy, Prei, Ponley Chas, Treas, Ampil Prong, Ou Kakaoh, Ta Voek

== Demographics ==
The district is subdivided into 8 communes (khum) and 63 villages (phum). According to the 1998 Census, the population of the district was 47,960 persons in 10,079 households in 1998. This population consisted of 23,491 males (49.0%) and 24,469 females (51.0%). With a population of under 50,000 people, Svay Chek has one of the smallest district populations in Banteay Meanchey Province. Only Malai and Phnom Srok districts are smaller. The average household size in Svay Chek is 4.8 persons per household, which is slightly smaller than the rural average for Cambodia (5.2 persons). The sex ratio in the district is 96.0%, with slightly more females than males.
