= Kumru =

Kumru may refer to:

- Kumru, Ordu, a town and district of Ordu Province in Turkey
- Kumru, Cambodia
- Kumru (sandwich), a Turkish sandwich
