= Kang Kek Iew =

Cambodian war criminal (1942–2020)

- កាំង ហ្គេកអ៊ាវ
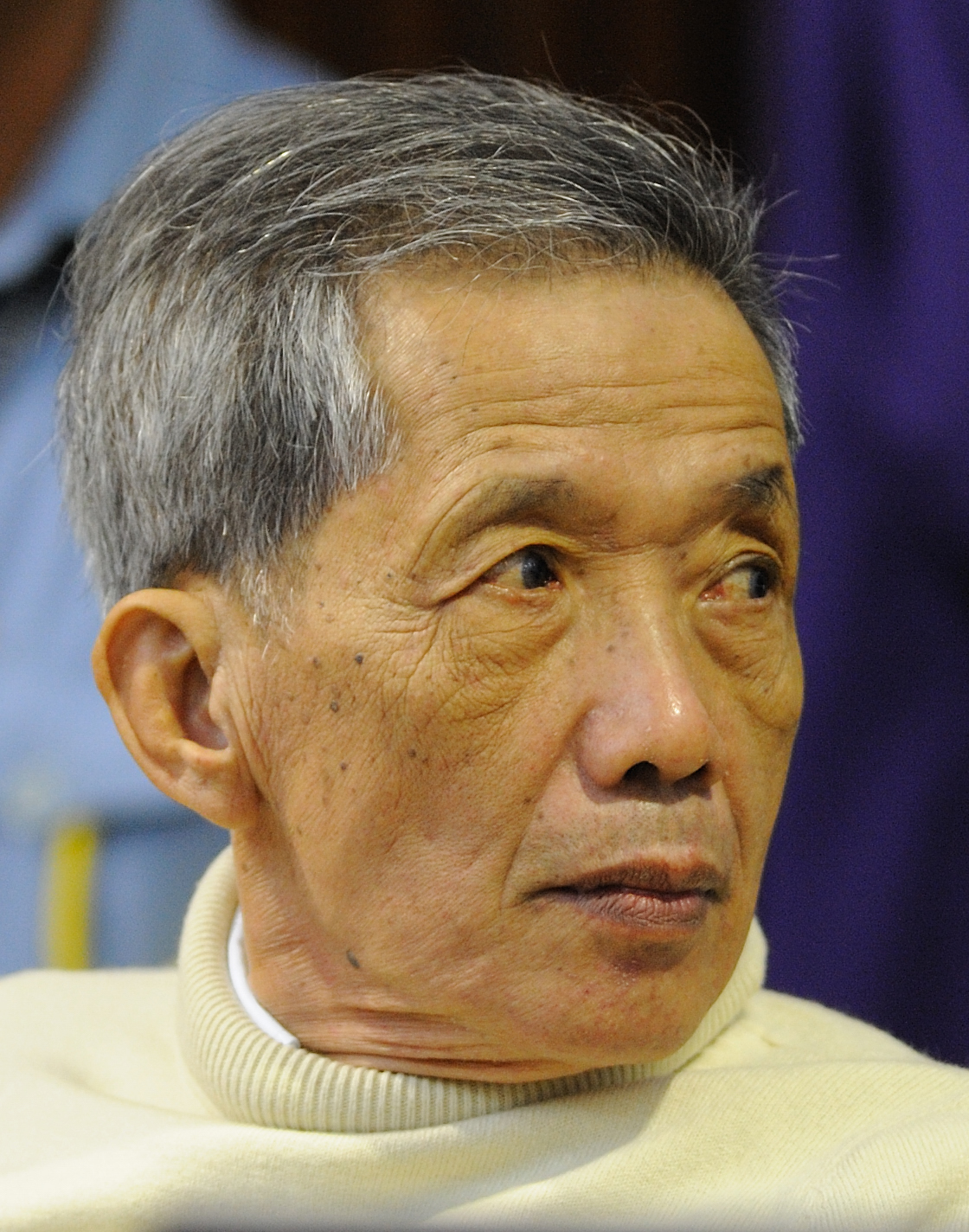
- Kang during his trial (2009)
- Born: 17 November 1942; Choyaot, Kampong Thom Province, Cambodia
- Died: 2 September 2020 (aged 77); Phnom Penh, Cambodia
- Other names: Comrade Duch; Hang Pin
- Known for: Director of the S-21 prison camp, Leader of Santebal
- Spouse: Chhim Sophal (died 1995)
- Conviction: Crimes against humanity
- Penalty: 30 years; increased to life (2 February 2012)

Details
- Date apprehended: May 1999

Kang Kek Iew, also spelled Kaing Guek Eav (Khmer: កាំង ហ្គេកអ៊ាវ [kaŋ geːk.ʔiəw]; 17 November 1942 – 2 September 2020), alias Comrade Duch (Khmer: សមមិត្តឌុច [samamɨt ɗuc]) or Hang Pin, was a Cambodian convicted war criminal and member of the Khmer Rouge movement, which ruled Democratic Kampuchea from 1975 to 1979. As the Chairman of Tuol Sleng (S-21) prison camp, and head of the Santebal, Kang Kek Iew was responsible for the interrogation and torture of thousands of individuals, and was convicted for the execution of at least 12,272 individuals, including women and children, but up to 14,000 in total could have died under his oversight.

Kek Iew was the first Khmer Rouge leader to be tried by the Extraordinary Chambers in the Courts of Cambodia for the crimes of the Khmer Rouge regime, and was convicted of crimes against humanity, murder, and torture for his role during the Khmer Rouge rule of Cambodia and sentenced to 30 years' imprisonment. On 2 February 2012 his sentence was extended to life imprisonment by the Extraordinary Chambers in the Courts of Cambodia.

Kek Iew, unlike many other Khmer Rouge cadres, did not dismiss or justify his crimes. He admitted that he had been wrong and that he had done horrible things; he said that he repented and that he had converted to Christianity. During his trial, he provided detailed accounts of what happened inside S-21 and inside the Khmer Rouge regime, although his testimony at times contained discrepancies and at the conclusion of his trial he asked to be freed.

== Early years ==
Kang Kek Iew was born in 1942 in Choyaot village, Kampong Chen subdistrict, Kampong Thom Province, to an ethnic Chinese family who migrated to Cambodia in his father's generation. A star pupil in his school, he passed his Brevet d'études secondaires de première in 1961 at the age of nineteen. He finished the first half of his Baccalaureate in 1962 at the Lycée Suravarman II in the town of Siem Reap. The same year he was offered a place in the prestigious Lycée Sisowath in Phnom Penh where he completed his Baccalaureate in mathematics, scoring second in the entire country.

From his childhood on, Kek Iew's name was changed many times. One such occasion of name changing took place when he was 15, when his parents changed his name to Yim Cheav.

As the name is important in Chinese culture, Kek Iew therefore gave his name to his grandson, significantly adding the Chinese name "Yun" to this name.

He was described by his former classmates as a bright and quiet boy who rarely smiled during his youth.

== Induction into the Khmer Rouge ==
In 1964, Kek Iew began studying for his teaching certificate in Mathematics, a subject he loved, at the Institut de Pédagogie. The institute was a cradle of activism under the directorship of Son Sen who was later to emerge as the Defence Minister of the Khmer Rouge and Duch's immediate superior.

On 28 August 1966, Kek Iew received his teaching certificate and was posted to a lycée in Skoun, a small town in Kampong Cham Province. He was a good teacher, remembered as earnest and committed by his pupils. He joined the Communist Party of Kampuchea in 1967. Following the arrest of three of his students, he fled to the Khmer Rouge base in Chamkar Leu District where he was accepted as a full member of the Communist Party of Kampuchea.

A few months later, he was arrested and witnessed others being tortured at the Prey Sar prison by Norodom Sihanouk's police for engaging in communist activities. He was held without trial for the next two years. In 1970, when he was released following the amnesty granted to political prisoners by Lon Nol, he joined the Khmer Rouge rebels in the Cardamom Mountains bordering Thailand.

== In the maquis ==
Communist groups in France's former colonies in Indochina borrowed the French World War II expression 'maquis' when referring to their resistance movements in the jungles.

In the zone under the control of the Khmer Rouge, Kek Iew took on his nom de guerre Comrade Duch and became a prison commandant. He was appointed the head of Special Security by his immediate superior Vorn Vet. In the forests of Amleang, Thpong District, Duch set up his first prison, code-named 'M-13'. Two years later, he also established a second prison 'M-99' in the nearby Aoral District.

Assisted by his two deputies, Mam Nai (Comrade Chan) and Tang Sin Hean (Comrade Pon), Duch began perfecting his interrogation techniques and the purging of perceived enemies from the Khmer Rouge ranks. Prisoners at these camps, mostly from the ranks of the Khmer Rouge, were routinely starved and tortured to extract real and made-up confessions.

While in the maquis, Duch married Chhim Sophal, aka Rom, a dressmaker from a nearby village. They had four children while he worked at S-21.

== Leading the Santebal and Tuol Sleng ==
After the Khmer Rouge victory in April 1975, Duch and his men set up prisons throughout the capital, including the infamous Tuol Sleng prison. Duch's request for a transfer in May 1975 to the Industrial Sector of government was denied. The Tuol Sleng prison camp was initially headed by In Lon (aka Comrade Nath) with Duch acting as deputy. Subsequently, In Lon was transferred and Duch was promoted to Director. By May 1976, all the prisons in Phnom Penh were consolidated and relocated to Tuol Sleng.

Prisons like Tuol Sleng were created to cleanse the population of suspected enemies of the revolution. In Tuol Sleng, Duch ordered the execution of prisoners after their interrogation was completed. For example, on a list containing the names of 17 prisoners (eight teenagers and nine children), he wrote the order "Smash them to pieces." On a longer list of detainees, his annotation reads "smash: 115; keep: 44 persons." The text below this annotation reads "Comrade Duch proposed to Angkar; Angkar agreed." On a list of 20 female detainees, Duch wrote annotations for each of them, ordering: "take away for execution," "keep for interrogation" or "medical experiment". At least 100 detainees died after having all of their blood drawn for transfusions for wounded soldiers. Surgical operations were also performed on detainees in order to train medical staff.

Duch impressed his superiors with his work and was appointed the head of Democratic Kampuchea's dreaded "special branch"; the Santebal.

As the party purges increased toward the end of the Democratic Kampuchea period, more people were brought to Duch, including former colleagues, among them his predecessor at Tuol Sleng, In Lon. Throughout this period, Duch built up a large archive of prison records, mug shots, and extracted "confessions".

On 6 January 1979, he was ordered by his superior to kill the remaining prisoners. The next day, Duch was among the last Khmer Rouge cadres to flee Phnom Penh after it fell to the Vietnamese army. Though he was unable to destroy much of the prison's extensive documents, he saw to the execution of several surviving prisoners before he fled the city.

== After the fall ==
Duch reached the border of Thailand in May 1979. Details of his whereabouts at this time remain unclear. It is believed that he went to the forests of Samlaut where he was reunited with his family. Here Duch was demoted by "Brother Number Two", Nuon Chea, for having failed to destroy the documents at Tuol Sleng. At the border, he learned to speak Thai and taught himself English. He later taught English and mathematics at a refugee camp in Borai just inside Thailand.

In June 1986, Duch was sent to China to teach as a Khmer language expert at the Beijing Foreign Language Institute. He returned to the Thai-Cambodian border a year later and changed his name to Hang Pin. He worked as a senior bureaucrat just inside the Cambodian border at Pol Pot's secretariat at Camp 505. Shortly after the Paris agreement in October 1991, he moved with his family to the small isolated village of Phkoam close to the Thai border. Here he purchased some land, and began teaching in the local school. He was known as a good teacher, but one with a fiery temper.

In 1995, Duch's wife was killed under mysterious circumstances in an attack on his home. Duch was the only witness and suspected Pol Pot of instigating it. He sold all his possessions, secured a transfer to Svay Chek College, and moved there with his children. Shortly after his wife's murder, Duch began attending the prayer meetings of the Golden West Cambodian Christian Church held in Battambang by Christopher LaPel, an evangelical Khmer-American. Duch was baptized by LaPel and eventually became a lay pastor. LaPel was later to observe that although he did not know Duch's real identity at the time, there were clues. For example, before his conversion, Duch had said to LaPel that he had done a lot of bad things in his life. Later, Duch was to say, "I don’t know if my brothers and sisters can forgive the sins I've committed against the people".

== Discovery ==
Soon after his identity was discovered, Duch accepted a transfer to Samlaut as Director of Education. When fighting broke out in 1996 following the split of the Khmer Rouge and the coup to oust Prince Rannariddh in 1997, he fled with his family to the Ban Ma Muang camp just inside Thailand. At the camp, he worked for the American Refugee Committee as the Community Health Supervisor. In late 1998, he returned to Cambodia when fighting subsided. He settled in the village of Andao Hep in Rattanak Mondul and worked closely with World Vision International, the Christian relief agency.

The photojournalist Nic Dunlop tracked Duch down in Samlaut. In 1999, Nate Thayer, who had previously interviewed Pol Pot and Ta Mok, and Dunlop interviewed Duch for the Far Eastern Economic Review. Duch surrendered to the authorities in Phnom Penh following the publication of this interview.

== Trial ==
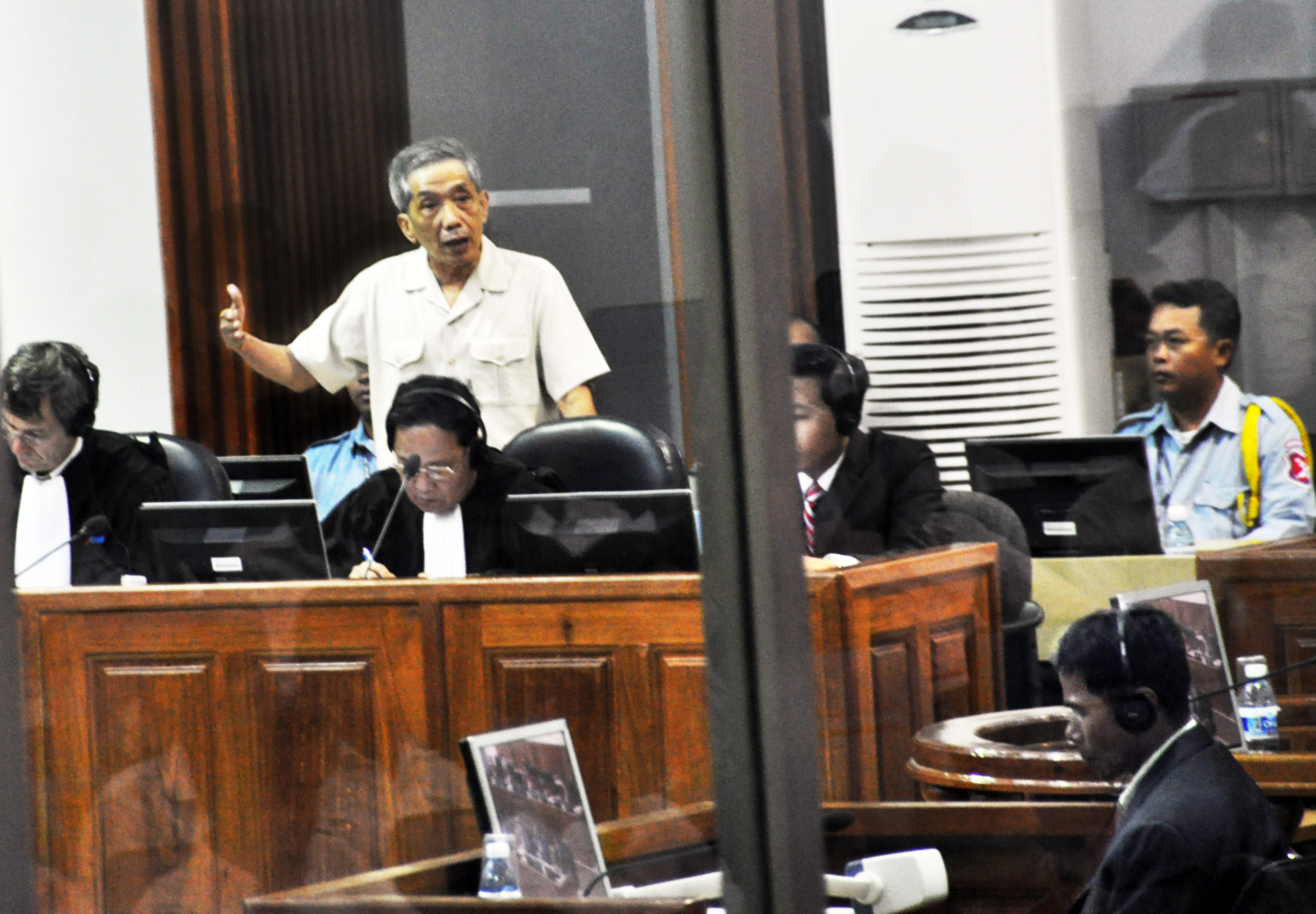
Duch before the Extraordinary Chambers in the Courts of Cambodia on 20 July 2009. He was responding to the testimony given by his former subordinate Him Huy who was a Khmer Rouge prison guard.

On 31 July 2007, Duch was formally charged with war crimes and crimes against humanity and detained by Cambodia's United Nations-backed Extraordinary Chambers in the Courts of Cambodia. Duch, represented by Cambodian lawyer Kar Savuth and French lawyer François Roux, appealed against his provisional detention by the Extraordinary Chambers in the Courts of Cambodia based on the more than eight years he spent without trial in Cambodian military detention. The appeal was unsuccessful and on 14 August 2008, the tribunal issued its indictment after completing their investigation of Duch.

In February 2008, as part of the judicial process, Duch was taken to Tuol Sleng prison, the scene of his crimes. He reportedly collapsed in tears after stating, "I ask for your forgiveness – I know that you cannot forgive me, but I ask you to leave me the hope that you might."

On 16 February 2009, the UN supervised trial of Duch began at a Phnom Penh court. Duch was prosecuted by international co-prosecutors William Smith and Anees Ahmed and was charged with "personally overseeing the systematic torture of more than 15,000 prisoners." The presiding judge of the case was Nil Nonn. Duch was tried by a panel of five judges — three Cambodian, one French, and one New Zealander — according to a 2003 pact between Cambodia and the United Nations establishing the tribunal.

On 31 March 2009, Duch, in a statement in front of the Cambodia tribunal, accepted responsibility for torturing and executing thousands of inmates, expressed "heartfelt sorrow" for his crimes against humanity and vowed to cooperate fully with the tribunal. On 6 April, he told the tribunal that "Mr Richard Nixon and [Henry] Kissinger allowed the Khmer Rouge to grasp golden opportunities" following the American bombing of Cambodia.

Duch surprised the tribunal on 27 November 2009 with a plea to be released. In his final statement before the tribunal he acknowledged his involvement in Khmer Rouge-era crimes, including the execution of more than 12,000 Tuol Sleng prisoners, but said they were committed by a "criminal party". Duch also noted that he had served more than 10 years in detention, and stressed that he had been fully cooperative with the tribunal. There were also conflicting closing arguments from Duch's defense team. His Cambodian lawyer, Kar Savuth, demanded his client's acquittal and release, while his international counterpart, François Roux, pressed judges to hand down a lenient sentence.

At the conclusion of the trial, prosecutors asked that Duch be given 40 years in prison if convicted. On 26 July 2010, Duch was found guilty of crimes against humanity, torture, and murder; he was sentenced to 35 years imprisonment, with a pre-trial detention credit of 11 years being applied to his sentence and an additional controversial five-year deduction because his period of pre-trial detention exceeded the maximum allowed under Cambodian law. On 3 February 2012, an upper court U.N. war crimes tribunal rejected his appeal and extended his sentence to life imprisonment because of his "shocking and heinous" crimes. The ruling was final with no other chance for appeal.

On 20 October 2018, Duch was hospitalized in serious condition.

== Death ==
After serving ten years in prison, on 2 September 2020, Duch died at the age of 77 at the Khmer–Soviet Friendship Hospital of chronic obstructive pulmonary disease. Due to the situation being complicated by the presence of the ongoing COVID-19 pandemic in Cambodia at the time, he was quickly cremated on the same day in Phnom Penh, without a Buddhist funeral.

== See also ==
- Democratic Kampuchea
- Khmer Rouge Killing Fields
- Tuol Sleng
- Chum Mey
- Vann Nath
- Shirō Ishii
- Enemies of the People (film)
