= O Smach =

O Smach អូរស្មាច់
- City
- Location within Cambodia
- Coordinates: 14°24′36″N 103°41′39″E
- Country: Cambodia
- Province: Oddar Meanchey Province
- Municipality: Samraong
- Time zone: UTC+7 (ICT)

O Smach (Khmer: អូរស្មាច់, Or Smăch, pronounced [ʔou.smac]) (also spelled O'Smach or Ou Smach) is a small Cambodian town on the Thai border in Samraong Municipality of Oddar Meanchey Province, situated north of the city of Samraong. Until 1999, there were intermittent battles, and the area was unsafe as the last remaining Khmer Rouge still had control of nearby Anlong Veng. In 2003, an international border crossing was opened between O Smach and the adjacent town of Chong Chom in Thailand's Surin Province. There has since opened a strip of casinos between the Cambodian and Thai passport control counters, enabling Thais to gamble in Cambodia without needing to go through Cambodian immigration. Gambling is illegal in Thailand and gambling in Cambodia is legal only for foreign passport holders. O Smach is at the northern terminus of Road 68 which turns north off National Highway 6 at Kravanh in Siem Reap Province.

== Border crossing ==
Most of Cambodia's northern border with Thailand is formed by the escarpment of the Dângrêk Mountains. A natural pass cuts through the mountains between O Smach and Chong Chom. This pass has been used since ancient times to travel between the plains of lower Cambodia and the Khorat Plateau. Beginning with the Cambodian Civil War and lasting until the surrender of the last remaining Khmer Rouge who had taken refuge in Anlong Veng, the Khmer Rouge controlled the area and generated income by illegally trading Cambodian timber across the border in Thailand. After the final surrender of the Khmer Rouge in 1999, the region surrounding the O Smach pass once again became stable and safe for travelers and, in 2003, the Cambodian and Thai governments opened an international border crossing. The border crossing suffered intermittent closures again between 2008 and 2011 during the 2008–2013 Cambodian–Thai border crisis.

The Thai government agreed to fund the extension of Cambodian National Road 68 from the provincial capital of Samraong to O Smach with an unspecified loan amount. Immediately, two casino hotels and a market were built in a strip between the Cambodian border control checkpoint and the Thai border crossing checkpoint at Chong Chom in Kap Choeng District, Surin Province to cater to Thai nationals coming to Cambodia to gamble. Gambling in Thailand is illegal but in Cambodia it is legal, although only for holders of foreign passports. This arrangement ensures Thai citizens can leave Thailand to gamble in O Smach and then return home without having to pass through Cambodian immigration. Thais living close to Chong Chom are responsible for the bulk of cross border activities. The O Smach border crossing is the least used among the Thai/Cambodian checkpoints. Most tourists en route to Siem Reap and Angkor Wat, cross the border at Poipet which is also the more popular gambling destination due to its relative ease of access from Bangkok.

O Smach benefits more from international trade. As of 2012, O Smach and its Thai counterpart, Chong Chom, had all the necessary customs facilities except for an agricultural quarantine officer. The main product exported from Cambodia through O Smach is cassava. There is also a large market for second-hand bicycles which are imported to Cambodia from Japan, taken to O Smach and sold across the border to Thais at the Chong Chom market. The primary imports at O Smach are used farm equipment, mostly tractors and trucks. Construction materials and petroleum products are also imported to Cambodia through O Smach.

During the 2025 Cambodian–Thai border crisis, Thai forces reportedly bombed the Royal Hill site with mortar and artillery and later occupied the compound. Thailand also accused the Cambodian forces of using the casino buildings for drone and sniper attacks, while Cambodian Information Minister Neth Pheaktra rejected that account, describing the site as civilian infrastructure.

== Future development ==
As of 2015, the only vehicle crossing between Cambodia and Thailand was at Poipet. Vehicles other than those given special permission by their respective central government are not allowed to cross the border at O Smach. However, starting in 2015, a Cambodian company began running a direct bus route from Siem Reap to O Smach. The 2.5 hour 160 km trip costs passengers US$12.50 and caters to "hospital tourists", Cambodians who are heading to the Thai town of Surin, where the Northern Khmer dialect is commonly spoken, for more trustworthy medical treatment. After producing passports or border passes and paying 10,000 riels (US$2.50), they cross the border on foot and board a Thai minivan that shuttles passengers on the final leg of the trip, a 45-minute stretch from O Smach to Surin for an additional 80 baht (US$0.50). Also in 2015, at a trade meeting in Siem Reap, Thai and Cambodian officials and entrepreneurs agreed to invest in an air-conditioned bus service between Thailand and Siem Reap through O Smach. The service was expected to begin before the Surin Elephant Round-up to encourage Cambodian visitors.
