= Nam Tau =

Nam Tau may refer to:

- Nam Tau, Cambodia, a commune and village in Banteay Meanchey province in western Cambodia
- Nantou Subdistrict (南頭), a subdistrict under the administration of Nanshan District, Shenzhen, Guangdong Province, China
