= Sla Kram =

Sla Kram ឃុំស្លក្រាម
- Commune
- Location within Cambodia
- Coordinates: 13°44′25″N 102°57′41″E
- Country: Cambodia
- Province: Banteay Meanchey
- District: Svay Chek District
- Villages: 10
- Time zone: UTC+07
- Geocode: 010803

Sla Kram is a khum (commune) of Svay Chek District in Banteay Meanchey Province in north-western Cambodia.

== Villages ==
- Sla Kram
- Kakaoh
- Kamnab
- Toap Siem
- Khlaeng Poar Cheung
- Prasat
- Kouk Ampil
- Khlaeng Poar Tboung
- Boeng Snao
- Chak Puork
