= Ta Baen =

Coordinates: 13°46′N 102°58′E

Ta Baen ឃុំតាបែន
- Commune
- Interactive map of Ta Baen
- Country: Cambodia
- Province: Banteay Meanchey
- District: Svay Chek District
- Villages: 5
- Time zone: UTC+07

Ta Baen is a khum (commune) of Svay Chek District in Banteay Meanchey Province in north-western Cambodia.

== Villages ==
- Kouk Ta Aek Village
- Ou Veaeng Cheung Village
- Ta Baen Village
- Kouk Roka Village
- Ou Veaeng Tboung Village
