= Treas, Cambodia =

Treas ឃុំទ្រាស
- Commune
- Location within Cambodia
- Coordinates: 13°51′51″N 102°59′27″E
- Country: Cambodia
- Province: Banteay Meanchey
- District: Svay Chek district
- Villages: 9
- Time zone: UTC+07:00 (Indochina Time)
- Geocode: 010807

Treas is a khum (commune) of Svay Chek district in Banteay Meanchey province in north-western Cambodia.

== Villages ==
Treas consists of nine villages:

- Ponley Thmei
- Chaeng
- Doun Nouy
- Prei
- Ponley Chas
- Treas
- Ampil Prong
- Ou Kakaoh
- Ta Voek
