= Trapeang Prasat District =

Trapeang Prasat ត្រពាំងប្រាសាទ
- District (srok)
- Interactive map of Trapeang Prasat
- Country: Cambodia
- Province: Oddar Meanchey
- Time zone: UTC+7 (ICT)
- Geocode: 2205

Trapeang Prasat District is a district in Oddar Meanchey Province in northern Cambodia. According to the 2008 census of Cambodia, it had a population of 25,533.

== Administration ==
The following table shows the villages of Trapeang Prasat District by commune.

Khum (Communes)	Phum (Villages)
Bak Anloung	Mean Chey, Sokh Serei, Sambour, Srae L'a, Tuol Prasaeur, Trapeang Prey
Ph'av	Chraok, Ou Chik, Ph'av, Ruessei, Thkov, Phdeak Chrum, Ou Beng, Thnol Keng, Por Pel, Knong Tuol Mean Chey, Ta Mod Mean Chey, Popel Saenchey
Ou Svay	Chheu Teal Chrum, Ou Lhong, Ou svay, Peam Knong, Ta Sam, Sen Sam, Toumnoub Akphivorth
Preah Pralay	Banteay Chas, Ou Rumduol, Preah Pralay, Tram Paong, Tram Chan, Tram Paong Khang Tboung, Prasat Krohom Saenchey
Tumnob Dach	Saen Sokh, Tumnob Dach, Tuol Pongro, Tuol Char, Tuol Prasat, Chey Nivoat
Trapeang Prasat	Chhuk Sa, Ou Krouch, Prey S'ak, Srah Chrey, Tumnob Thmei, Tuol Ta Sek, Trapeang Prasat, Thnal Kaeng, O Saom, Sre Korndal, Pean Meas, Ou Trach, Sre Krorsang, Ou Romdeng, De Chor Akpiwat
