= Samraong Municipality =

Samraong municipality ក្រុងសំរោង Krong Samraong
- Municipality
- Location in Cambodia
- Coordinates: 14°15′N 103°35′E
- Country: Cambodia
- Province: Oddar Meanchey
- Time zone: UTC+7 (ICT)
- Geocode: 2204

Samraong municipality (Khmer: ក្រុងសំរោង) is a municipality (previously called 'district') in Oddar Meanchey province in northern Cambodia. It is the urban part of the province. The provincial capital Samraong lies in the district. According to the 1998 census of Cambodia, it had a population of 22,361.

== Administration ==
The following table shows the villages of Samraong municipality by commune.

Khum (communes)	Phum (villages)
Bansay Reak	Bansay Reak, Kamnab, Rumduol Veasna, Sambuor Meas, Tnaot, Kakse-Tepporthivong, Khnach Ruessei, Trapeang Maom Saen Chey
Bos Sbov	Bos Sbov, Krasang, Phlong Chas, Ou Preal, Trabaek, Prasat, Pong Tuek, Phlong Thmei
Koun Kriel	Khtum, Ta Man, Thnal Bat, Anlong Veaeng, Trapeang Veaeng, Thmei, Trapeang Slaeng, Kouk Prasat, Kdol, Kirivoant, Champa Sokh, Ph'ong, Koun Kriel, Chheu Kram, Ou Pok, Dorng Tong, Romdoul Cheungphnom, Chhouk meas, Kouk Chhuk, Kouk Phluk, Trapeang Toung, Kouk Ampil, Ou Ruessei, Sras Prich, Chrueng Khang Kaeut, Chrueng Khang Lech, Boss, Kouk Chanry, Samroang Saenchey 1, Samroang Saenchey 2
Samraong	Doun Kaen, Ou Ruessei, Pul, Chhuk, Ou Kravan, Phniet, Samraong, Kandaek, Kouk Chambak, Kouk Chres, Kouk Kor, Kouk Rumduol, Chh'aeub, Ou Kansaeng, Koun Damrei, Bak Nuem, Borei Rothbal, Doun Keosenchey
O Smach	Akphivodth, Chamkar Chek, Derm Chrey, Kiri Mongkol, Ruot Champei, O Smach, Sras Teuk, Ou Khla khmum
