= Phum Thmei =

Phum Thmei ឃុំភូមិថ្មី
- Commune
- Location within Cambodia
- Coordinates: 13°53′28″N 103°04′02″E
- Country: Cambodia
- Province: Banteay Meanchey
- District: Thma Puok District
- Villages: 7
- Time zone: UTC+07
- Geocode: 010703

Phum Thmei is a khum (commune) of Thma Puok District in Banteay Meanchey Province in north-western Cambodia.

== Villages ==
- Kab Chaor(កាប់ចោរ)
- Kouk Svay(គោកស្វាយ)
- Rumlum Chrey(រំលំជ្រៃ)
- Thmei Lech(ថ្មីលិច)
- Thmei Kandal(ថ្មីកណ្ដាល)
- Thmei Khang Tbong(ថ្មីខាងត្បូង)
- Totea(ទទា)
