= Srah Chik =

Srah Chik ឃុំស្រះជីក
- Commune
- Location within Cambodia
- Coordinates: 13°44′N 103°20′E
- Country: Cambodia
- Province: Banteay Meanchey
- District: Phnom Srok District
- Villages: 9
- Time zone: UTC+07
- Geocode: 010305

Srah Chik is a khum (commune) of Phnom Srok District in Banteay Meanchey Province in western Cambodia.

== Villages ==
- Moat Srah
- Srah Chhuk Khang Lech
- Srah Chik
- Kouk Kraol
- Kouk Rumchek
- Kouk Ta Reach
- Kandal Khang Lech
- Kandal Khang Kaeut
- Srah Chhuk Khang Kaeut
