= Spean Sraeng =

Spean Sraeng ឃុំស្ពានស្រែង
- Commune
- Location within Cambodia
- Coordinates: 13°42′43″N 103°23′59″E
- Country: Cambodia
- Province: Banteay Meanchey
- District: Phnum Srok District
- Villages: 6
- Time zone: UTC+07
- Geocode: 010304

Spean Sraeng is a khum (commune) of Phnum Srok District in Banteay Meanchey Province in western Cambodia.

== Villages ==
- Rouk
- Mukh Chhneang
- Spean
- Kouk Char
- Kandaol
- Pongro
