= Thma Puok (commune) =

Coordinates: 13°56′N 103°03′E

Phum Thmei ឃុំថ្មពួក
- Commune
- Interactive map of Phum Thmei
- Country: Cambodia
- Province: Banteay Meanchey
- District: Thma Puok District
- Villages: 7
- Time zone: UTC+07

Thma Puok is a khum (commune) of Thma Puok District in Banteay Meanchey Province in north-western Cambodia.

It is the capital of Thma Puok District.

== Villages ==
- Thma Puok(ថ្មពួក)
- Neak Ta(អ្នកថា)
- Voat Chas(វត្ដចាស់)
- Kasen(ក្សេន្ត)
- Svay(ស្វាយ)
- Thnal Dach(ថ្នល់ដាច់)
- Anlong Trach(អន្លង់ត្រាច)
