= Kouk Kakthen =

Commune in Thma Puok District, Banteay Meanchey, Cambodia

Coordinates: 13°52′N 103°07′E

Kouk Kakthen ឃុំគោកកឋិន
- Commune
- Interactive map of Kouk Kakthen
- Country: Cambodia
- Province: Banteay Meanchey
- District: Thma Puok District
- Villages: 9
- Time zone: UTC+07

Kouk Kakthen (Khmer: ឃុំគោកកឋិន) is a khum (commune) of Thma Puok District in Banteay Meanchey Province in north-western Cambodia.

== Villages ==
- Dei(ដី)
- Sdau(ស្ដៅ)
- Treas
- Kouk Kakthen(គោកកឋិន)
- Ta Siev(តាសៀវ)
- Chonleas Dai(ជន្លាសដៃ)
- Ta Trai(តាត្រៃ)
- Preah Chhor(ព្រះឈរ)
- Kouk Khpos(គោកខ្ពស់)
