= Svay Chek (commune) =

Coordinates: 13°48′N 102°58′E

Svay Chek ឃុំស្វាយចេក
- Commune
- Interactive map of Svay Chek
- Country: Cambodia
- Province: Banteay Meanchey
- District: Svay Chek District
- Villages: 14
- Time zone: UTC+07

Svay Chek is a khum (commune) of Svay Chek District in Banteay Meanchey Province in north-western Cambodia.

It is the district seat.

== Villages ==
- Kouk Khvav
- Ponsay Cheung
- Kloeng
- Baek Chan Chas
- Ponsay Tboung
- Roka Thmei
- Ta Ong Lech
- Slaeng
- Thmei
- Khvav Lech
- Samraong
- Chamkar Kor
- Damnak Kokos
- Lboek Svay
