= Poy Char =

Poy Char ឃុំប៉ោយចារ
- Commune
- Location within Cambodia
- Coordinates: 13°52′00″N 103°17′40″E
- Country: Cambodia
- Province: Banteay Meanchey
- District: Phnum Srok District
- Villages: 8
- Time zone: UTC+07
- Geocode: 010302

Poy Char is a khum (commune) of Phnom Srok District in Banteay Meanchey Province in western Cambodia.

== Villages ==
- Paoy Snuol
- Paoy Char
- Trapeang Thma Tboung
- Trapeang Thma Cheung
- Trapeang Thma Kandal
- Paoy Ta Ong
- Sambuor
- Pongro
