= Ta Phou =

Coordinates: 13°46′N 103°03′E

Ta Phou ឃុំតាផូ
- Commune
- Interactive map of Ta Phou
- Country: Cambodia
- Province: Banteay Meanchey
- District: Svay Chek District
- Villages: 11
- Time zone: UTC+07

Ta Phou is a khum (commune) of Svay Chek District in Banteay Meanchey Province in north-western Cambodia.

== Villages ==
- Ta Phou
- Pongro
- Ta Srei
- Prech Kei
- Kouk Kei
- Khmoas
- Thmei
- Baray
- Phchoek
- Prech Tboung
- Bantoat Baoh
