= Kouk Romiet =

Commune in Thma Puok District, Banteay Meanchey, Cambodia

Kouk Romiet ឃុំគោករមៀត
- Commune
- Location within Cambodia
- Coordinates: 13°59′57″N 102°56′38″E
- Country: Cambodia
- Province: Banteay Meanchey
- District: Thma Puok District
- Villages: 20
- Time zone: UTC+07

Kouk Romiet (Khmer: ឃុំគោករមៀត) is a khum (commune) of Thma Puok District in Banteay Meanchey Province in north-western Cambodia.

== Villages ==
Kouk Romiet contains twenty villages.

=== Kouk Prich ===
In 1998, the village of Kouk Prich had a population of 1,452 (718 men and 734 women) in 268 households.

The village is located at 13°57′20″N 102°56′55″E.

=== Srae L'a ===
In 1998, the village of Srae L'a had a population of 1,660 (803 men and 857 women) in 357 households.

The village is located at 13°59′57″N 102°56′38″E.

=== Kouk Romiet ===
In 1998, the village of Kouk Romiet had a population of 778 (381 men and 397 women) in 148 households.

=== Sdau ===
In 1998, the village of Sdau had a population of 203 (93 men and 110 women) in 39 households.

=== Thmei ===
In 1998, the village of Thmei had a population of 1,127 (559 men and 568 women) in 242 households.

The village is located at 13°59′50″N 102°57′59″E.

=== Ta Lei ===
In 1998, the village of Ta Lei had a population of 399 (186 men and 213 women) in 89 households.

=== Sereika ===
In 1998, the village of Sereika had a population of 143 (77 men and 66 women) in 28 households.

=== Ta Song ===
In 1998, the village of Ta Song had a population of 459 (234 men and 225 women) in 96 households.

=== Trapeang Samraong ===
In 1998, the village of Trapeang Samraong had a population of 112 (55 men and 57 women) in 21 households.

=== Phlov Bambaek ===
In 1998, the village of Phlov Bambaek had a population of 196 (101 men and 95 women) in 41 households.

=== Thma Chhatr ===
In 1998, the village of Thma Chhatr had a population of 218 (113 men and 105 women) in 49 households.

=== Voa Preng ===
In 1998, the village of Voa Preng had a population of 329 (175 men and 154 women) in 66 households.

=== Pram Minea ===
In 1998, the village of Pram Minea had a population of 190 (95 men and 95 women) in 40 households.

=== Sameakki ===
In 1998, the village of Sameakki had a population of 1,039 (536 men and 503 women) in 227 households.

=== Banteay Mean Rit ===
In 1998, the village of Banteay Mean Rit had a population of 3,902 (1,998 men and 1,904 women) in 825 households.

=== Spean ===
In 1998, the village of Spean had a population of 240 (124 men and 116 women) in 51 households.

=== Kandaol ===
The village of Kandaol is located at 13°59′24″N 102°59′20″E.

=== Kdoeb Thmor ===
In 1998, the village of Kdoeb Thmor (also Kdeb Thmar) had a population of 487 (241 men and 246 women) in 101 households.

=== Boeng Ta Srei ===
In 1998, the village of Boeng Ta Srei had a population of 348 (173 men and 175 women) in 73 households.
