= Sarongk =

Coordinates: 13°45′N 103°07′E

Sarongk ឃុំសារង្គ
- Commune
- Interactive map of Sarongk
- Country: Cambodia
- Province: Banteay Meanchey
- District: Svay Chek District
- Villages: 6
- Time zone: UTC+07

Sarongk is a khum (commune) of Svay Chek District in Banteay Meanchey Province in north-western Cambodia.

== Villages ==
- Pheas Tboung (ភូមិភាសត្បូង)
- Pheas Cheung
- Chrung
- Phlas Kang
- Kouk Phlu
- Kantrong
