= Nam Tau, Cambodia =

Coordinates: 13°51′N 103°24′E

Nam Tau ឃុំណាំតៅ
- Commune
- Interactive map of Nam Tau
- Country: Cambodia
- Province: Banteay Meanchey
- District: Phnom Srok District
- Villages: 17
- Time zone: UTC+07
- Geocode: 010301

Nam Tau is a khum (commune) of Phnom Srok District in Banteay Meanchey Province in western Cambodia.

== Villages ==
- Rongvean
- Thmei Khang Tboung
- Thmei Khang Cheung
- Kouk Yeang
- Kouk Chas
- Chrab
- Kantuot
- Nam Tau
- Pongro
- Samraong
- Khnang
- Thnong Khang Tboung
- Thnong Khang Cheung
- Slaeng
- Ta Kong
- Yeang Otdam
- Ampel Kaong
- Kung Seim
