= Kumru, Cambodia =

Commune in Thma Puok District, Banteay Meanchey, Cambodia

Coordinates: 13°57′N 103°03′E

Kumru ឃុំគំរូ
- Commune
- Interactive map of Kumru
- Country: Cambodia
- Province: Banteay Meanchey
- District: Thma Puok District
- Villages: 7
- Time zone: UTC+07

Kumru (Khmer: ឃុំគំរូ) is a khum (commune) of Thma Puok District in Banteay Meanchey Province in north-western Cambodia.

== Villages ==
- Andoung Khlong(អណ្ដូងខ្លុង)
- Kumru គំរូ
- Ta Yueng តាយឹង
- Aekakpheap ឯកភាព
- Phsar Thmei ផ្សារថ្មី
- Svay Chrum ស្វាយជ្រុំ
- Prey Veng ព្រៃវែង
