= Phkoam =

Coordinates: 13°50′N 103°08′E

Phkoam ឃុំផ្គាំ
- Commune
- Interactive map of Phkoam
- Country: Cambodia
- Province: Banteay Meanchey
- District: Svay Chek District
- Villages: 11
- Time zone: UTC+07

Phkoam is a khum (commune) of Svay Chek District in Banteay Meanchey Province in north-western Cambodia.

== Villages ==
- Phkoam
- Yeang Vien
- Yeang
- Ampil
- Ou
- Prasat Vien
- Ta Duol
- Svay Sa
- Mau
- Thma Koul
- Ta Kul
