= Banteay Chhmar =

Angkorian urban centre in Banteay Meanchey, Cambodia

Banteay Chhmar បន្ទាយឆ្មារ
- Angkorian Urban Centre
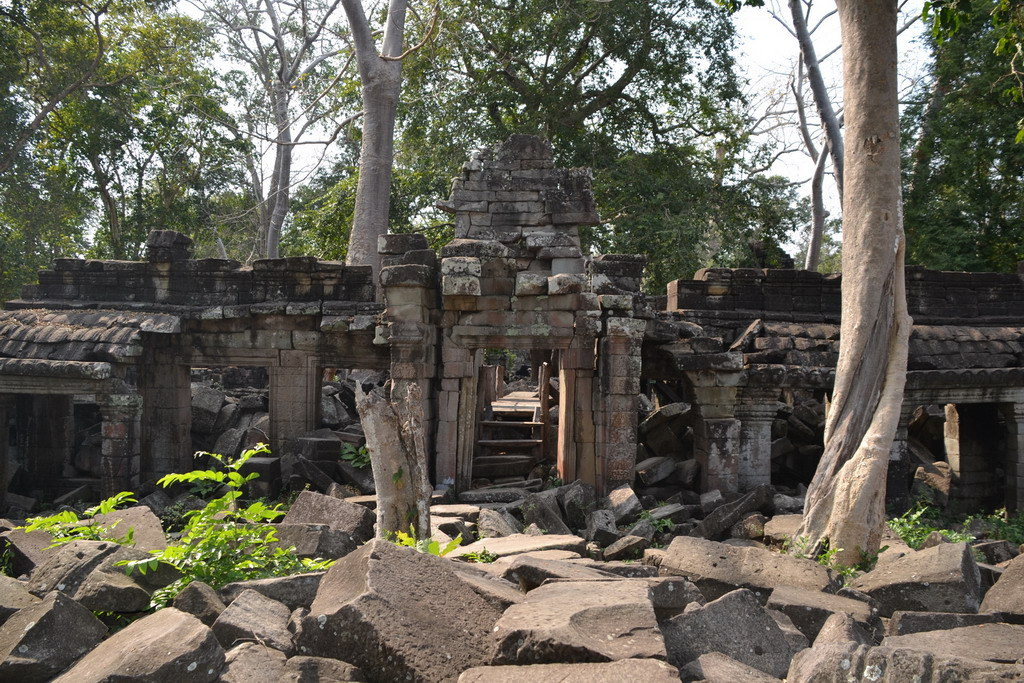
- Banteay Chhmar Temple

- Location within Cambodia
- Coordinates: 14°4′16″N 103°5′59″E
- Country: Cambodia
- Province: Banteay Meanchey
- District: Thma Puok District

Banteay Chhmar is an urban centre from the Angkorian period, situated in the northwest Cambodian province Banteay Meanchey, near to the Dangrek Mountains and the border of Thailand.^{5} Thought to be a military centre or fortress, Banteay Chhmar is best known for the sandstone temples, Bayon style and hydraulic system.^{3}^{514}^{170} Recent research has produced a more complete understanding of the site, further exploring the role of Banteay Chhmar in the region. Developed by Jayavarman VII, Banteay Chhmar is a unique example of Angkorian urbanism, dissimilar to other 'open cities' of the period.^{171} As a result, Banteay Chhmar has helped archaeologists to better understand Angkor, in particular, the rule of Jayavarman VII.

== History ==
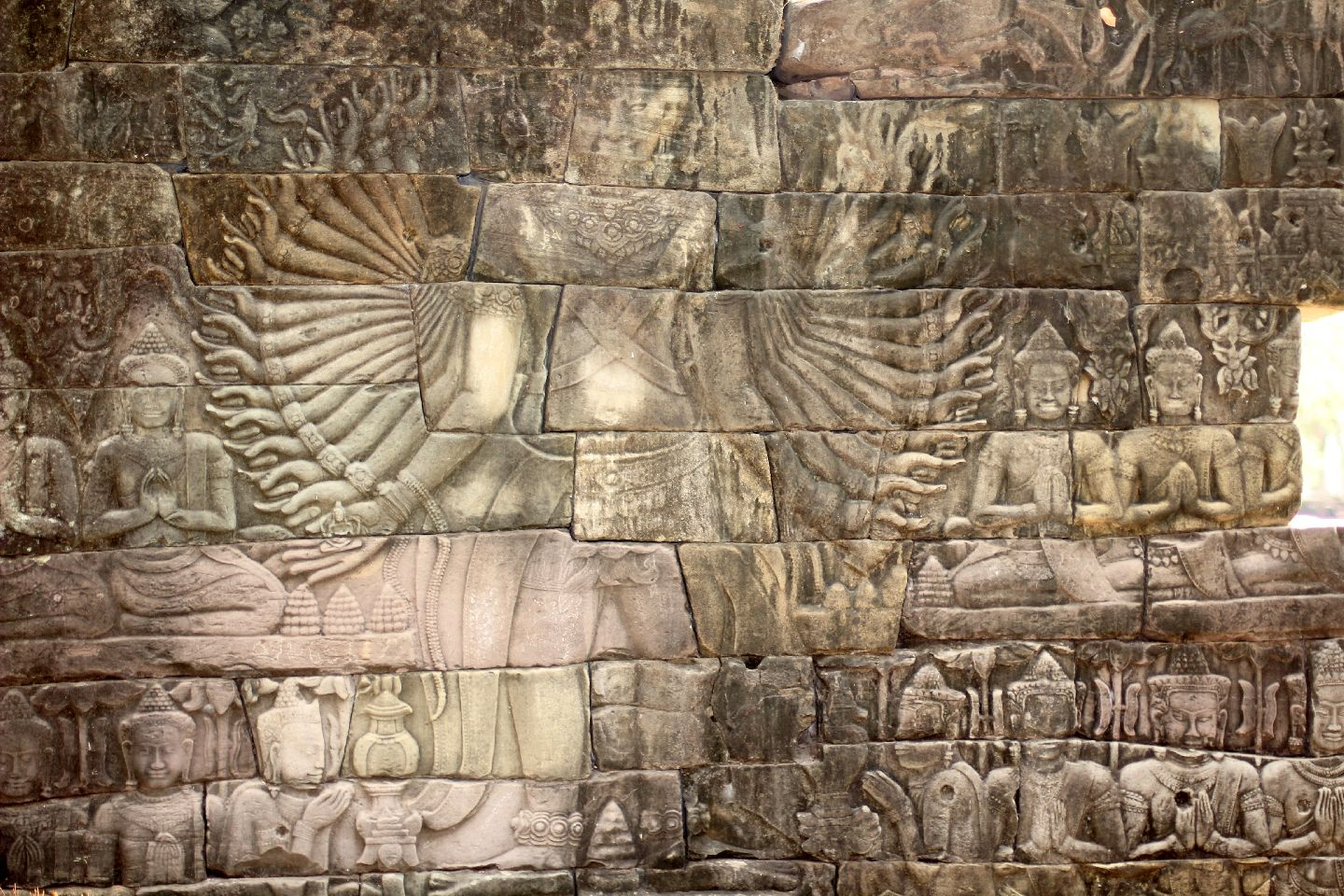
Relief of Lokeśvara at Banteay Chhmar

=== Height of Banteay Chhmar ===
Under the rule of Jayavarman II, populations moved northward, creating centres in the north and northwest of Cambodia.^{123-4} During the following Angkor period, Banteay Chhmar was created by Jayavarman VII and flourished between the 12th and 13th centuries C.E.^{185}^{96} Jayavarman VII is one of the best-known Khmer rulers, described as expanding and unifying Angkor throughout his reign.^{33} Reflecting Buddhist beliefs, Banteay Chhmar incorporates the Bayon style that was developed under Jayavarman VII. Unlike other urban centres, Banteay Chhmar was constructed in a regional, arid area and does not follow a formal grid-layout.^{185}^{172} As a result, archaeologists are uncertain about the role of Banteay Chhmar, positing military, religious, political and medical purposes.^{185}^{3}

=== Contemporary research ===
During the late 20th century, archaeological research in Cambodia was halted by the Cambodian Civil War. The war limited access to, and intentionally damaged, many places of archaeological and heritage significance.^{38} In the decades since, Cambodian and international archaeologists have worked to better understand the history of Cambodia, addressing issues of preservation, environmental management and colonial bias. The findings of colonial archaeologists continue to influence Cambodian history and heritage, upheld by problematic Orientalist perspectives.^{43-8} However, contemporary archaeology is increasingly led by Cambodian archaeologists and the perspectives of Khmer people, producing new methods and interpretations.^{56}

The Cambodian Lidar Initiative (CALI) uses airborne laser scanning (ALS) to produce images of the Cambodian landscape, mapping anthropogenic change.^{164} The integration of Geographic Information System (GIS) with ALS data, has mapped vast urban, agricultural and hydraulic networks.^{165} In so doing, CALI has revealed new understandings of chronology, environment and residential life, which have been previously limited by issues of preservation.^{164-5} ALS data can also infer population dynamics and movement, used by GIS to map the settlement patterns of Angkor. This bares importance for a number of on-going debates within Cambodian archaeology, including urban systems, water management and the decline of Angkor.^{172-4}^{12595} ALS has been applied to the site of Banteay Chhmar, providing insight into the development and use of the site.^{170-1}

== Site and structures ==
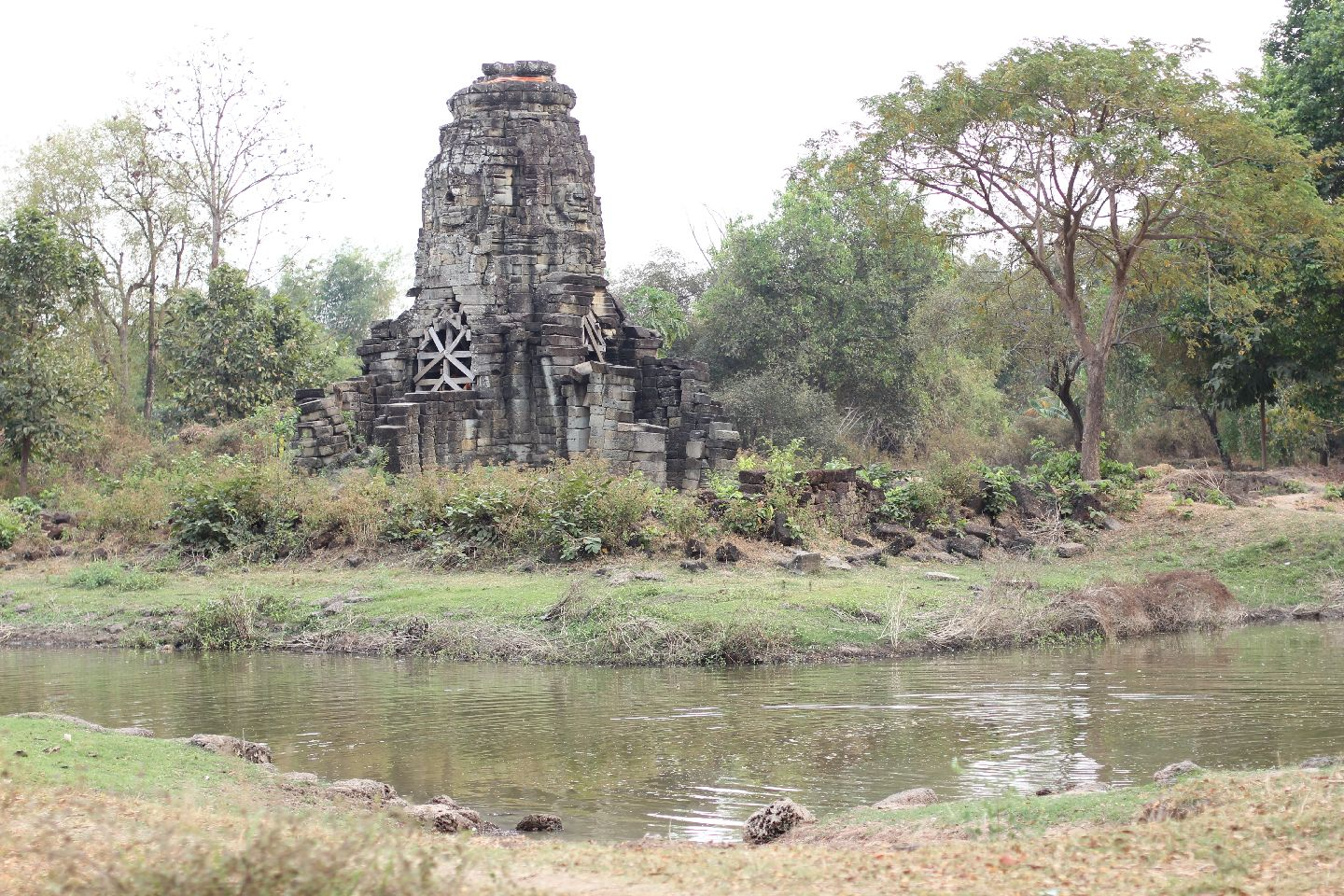
A temple and moat at Banteay Chhmar

Evidence of temples, stone structures and a hydraulic system can be found at Banteay Chhmar.

The temples at Banteay Chhmar follow the Bayon style of Jayavarman VII, named after the Buddhist state temple in Angkor Thom.^{510} Banteay Chhmar consists of one primary temple with extended galleries and smaller, satellite temples.^{3} Temples were laid in cardinal directions, invoking the Supreme Buddha at the centre of the mandala.^{582-658} The mandala also came to represent political power, with one 'universal ruler' in control.^{583} The temples were primarily constructed from sandstone, thought to have been quarried from Ta Phraya at the foothill of Mount Kulen.^{14} The temples were then adorned with inscriptions, reliefs and statues, representing a number of religious and political ideas.

Jayavarman VII oversaw unprecedented urban expansion during his reign, in particular, developing ceremonial architecture.^{514} Jayavarman VII promoted Mahayana Buddhism as the state religion, installing Buddhist and tantric imagery throughout Angkor.^{486} Banteay Chhmar was part of this development, creating spaces where people could encounter the divine.^{514} The temples at Banteay Chhmar display multiarmed Heruka dancing deities, alongside other tantric images such as Lokeśvara.^{658-9}^{70} In addition, reliefs record chariots, horses, elephants and foot soldiers, describing systems of military power and transport.^{446} Medical imagery is also present at the site, namely, carvings which denote a medicine blessing ceremony.^{227} Given the location of Banteay Chhmar, archaeologists have suggested that the site was part of a medical network established by Jayavarman VII.^{227}

Unlike other 11th to 13th century C.E. temples, Banteay Chhmar did not follow a grid layout.^{185}^{171} This was confirmed by recent ALS imagery of the site, which revealed 'almost no evidence of a formal urban grid.' 171 In contrast to the Angkorian model of urban development, there is little evidence of a central core, nor a successive urban complex.^{185}^{171}

Archaeologists have discovered an extensive hydraulic system which helped to manage water at the site. Banteay Chmmar was located in a dry, arid region which would have fallen victim to both draughts and floods.^{171} As a result, water management was important to Banteay Chhmar, which developed a series of moats, channels, cannels, catchments and baray. These served to store water during the dry season, as well as clear water during the wet season.^{171} This system harnessed natural run-off and overflow, building slopes and channels to move water, as well as source water from the Dangrek Mountains.^{4}

Banteay Chhmar is uniquely constructed and located, raising questions about the purpose of the site. Archaeologists have developed several interpretations, the most prominent being a 'city' or 'garrison-temple' which was periodically inhabited.^{185}^{4} In these renderings, Banteay Chhmar was an important religious, political or military centre, which played a role in cementing Angkorian power in the region.^{185}^{4}

== Heritage ==
The archaeological complex of Banteay Chhmar is recognised by the UNESCO World Heritage Convention, praised for the water management system, temple complex and Buddhist motifs. However, Banteay Chmmar – along with other Angkorian sites – has undergone significant destruction and looting in the past decades.^{729}^{34-5} This has robbed the site of many valuable and portable features, including a number of reliefs and statues.^{729-30}^{34-5} Many of these items remain lost, traded to vast market networks throughout Southeast Asia.^{722}

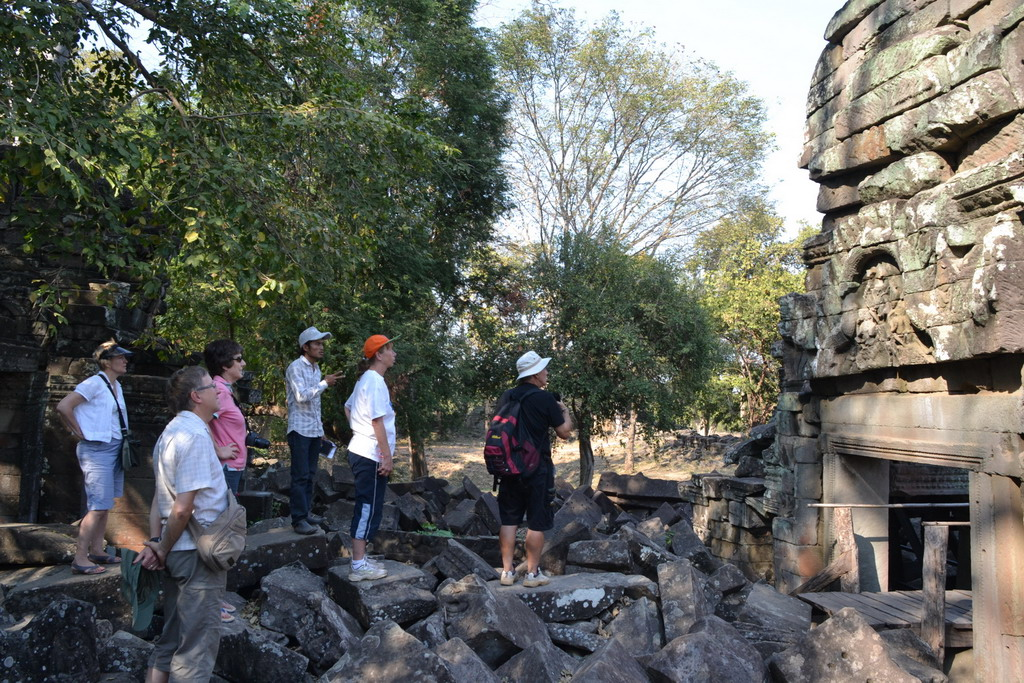
Tour of the Banteay Chhmar temple complex

Banteay Chhmar is also a place of significance to the local community, continuing to be used by the Cambodian people long after the Angkorian period. The Global Heritage Fund and Heritage Watch have supported the local people in establishing community-based tourism.^{206} This calls for tourism which supports the local economy, benefits built and social infrastructure and protects regional heritage and environments.^{37-8} Community-based tourism aims to embed long-term and sustainable practices, often applied within remote contexts.^{37-8} At Banteay Chhmar, The Global Heritage Fund and Provincial Government worked to provide education, training and support to the local community, seeking to expand tourism and preserve the site. Although the practice of community-based tourism is still developing, the project has begun to benefit heritage, tourism, business and infrastructure at Banteay Chhmar.^{207-9}^{368-9}^{393-4}
