= Phnom Srok (town) =

Phnom Srok ភ្នំស្រុក
- Town
- Location within Cambodia
- Coordinates: 13°45′N 103°20′E
- Country: Cambodia
- Province: Banteay Meanchey
- District: Phnom Srok District

Phnom Srok is a town and seat of Phnom Srok District in Banteay Meanchey Province in north-western Cambodia. It is located 52 kilometres north-east of Sisophon.
