= Chong Kal District =

Chong Kal ចុងកាល Chong Khan
- District (srok)
- Location in Cambodia
- Coordinates: 14°10′N 103°35′E
- Country: Cambodia
- Province: Oddar Meanchey
- Elevation: 32 m (105 ft)
- Time zone: +7
- Geocode: 2203

Chong Kal District is a district in Oddar Meancheay province in northern Cambodia. According to the 1998 census of Cambodia, it had a population of 18,843.

== Administration ==
The following table shows the villages of Chong Kal district by commune.

Khum (Communes)	Phum (Villages)
Cheung Tien	Cheung Tien, Srae Prang, Kouk Pongro, Ta Nouk, Kouk Trang, Chhkae Sraeng, Kouk Reang
Chong Kal	Chong Kal, Kouk Voat, Ka, Prey Thum, Chhork, Srama, Banteay Chas, Ah Toa, Bat Thkao, Banteay Thmey
Krasang	Khnar, Chhuk, Kouk Spean, Koul, Chek Kbour, Kouk Samrech, Kouk Thnong, Rolum Veaeng, Kouk Bantoat Baoh, Kouk Thom
Pongro	Pongro, Ampil, Ta Paen, Kandaol Dom, Banteay Choar, Srah Kaev, Kouk Sangkae, Prey Nokor,
