= Kralanh District =

Kralanh ក្រឡាញ់
- District (srok)
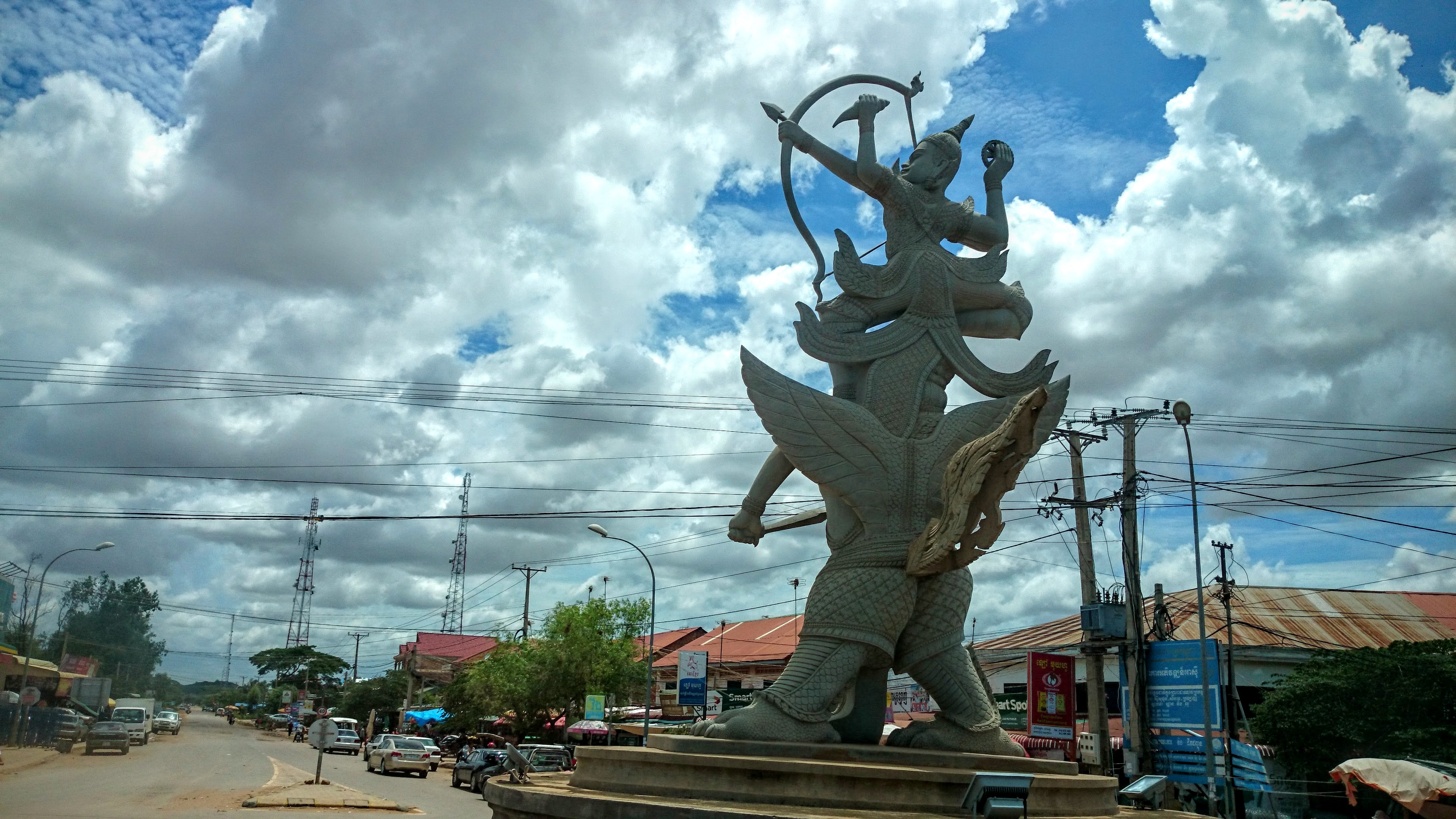
- Kralanh

- District location in Siem Reap Province
- Coordinates: 13°35′N 103°30′E
- Country: Cambodia
- Province: Siem Reap
- Time zone: +7
- Geocode: 1706

Kralanh District is a district located in Siem Reap Province, in north-west Cambodia. According to the 1998 census of Cambodia, it had a population of 56,915.

== Administrative divisions ==
Code Commune	Commune	Name Commune Language Khmer	Village
170601	Chonleas Dai	ចន្លាសដៃ	ត្រាំកង់, ឈូករ័ត្ន, រុន, គោកត្នោត, ខ្នារជោ, ដំរីស្លាប់, តាមាឃ, ចន្លាស់ដៃ, ព្រះលាន, រលំស្វាយ, កំបោរ, ដូនកាយថ្មី
170602	Kampong Thkov	កំពង់ថ្កូវ	កំពង់ថ្កូវ ០១, កំពង់ថ្កូវ ០២, ខ្សាច់, អូរថ្កូវ, គោកដូង, ដូរ្យតន្រ្តី, ចំបក់ហែរ, ភ្នំទ្រង់បាត
170603	Kralanh	ក្រឡាញ់	តាច្រែង, ត្រពាំងច្រាំង, អូរក្រឡាញ់, កោះក្របៅ, ក្រឡាញ់, ពេជ្ជោរ, សំពៅលូន
170604	Krouch Kor	ក្រូចគរ	គោកចំបក់, ព្រៃខ្យង, រើល, គោកថ្មី, ខ្នារជើង, ខ្នារត្បូង
170605	Roung Kou	រោងគោ	រោងគោ, ព្រៃគាប, បុស្សធំ, តានី, កញ្ជន់ជ្រៅ, ខ្ជាយ, ល្បើកប្រីយ៍, ល្បើក, ឫស្សី
170606	Sambuor	សំបួរ	គោកក្រូច, អន្លង់សារ, ដំណាក់ខ្ចាស់, សំបួរ, ឪម៉ាល់, គោកចាស់, អំពិល, សន្ថន
170607	Saen Sokh	សែនសុខ	ច្រនៀង, ព្រៃក្រឡាញ់, គោកកី, គោកភ្ងាស, គោកយាង, ស្មាច់, អង្កោល, ដំរីស្លាប់, តាសុខ, តាស្រី, ខ្សី, ស្វាយ, ទ្រាស, ក្រូច, ព្រៃថ្កូវ, តាប៉ាង
170608	Snuol	ស្នួល	ស្នួល, តាឡឹង, សំរោង, តាពេជ, សងែ្ក, ព្រៃល្ងៀង, តាសែង, ធាស្នា, តាយិន
170609	Sranal	ស្រណាល	ល្អុង, ស្រណាល, គោកត្រុំ, រំដេង, គំរូ, តាំងយូ, ទន្លាប់, សែ្លង, គោកចាស់, ផ្លាំង, មានជ័យ, គោកត្នោត, រវៀង
170610	Ta An	តាអាន	ក្តុល, ភ្នំតូច, តាអាន, ថ្មី, តាឡឹង, សំរោង, ទឹកជុំ, ត្រពាំងឈូក, អន្លង់, សរសៃពង
