= Srei Snam District =

Srei Snam ស្រុកស្រីស្នំ
- District (srok)
- District location in Siem Reap Province
- Coordinates: 13°45′N 103°55′E
- Country: Cambodia
- Province: Siem Reap
- Time zone: +7
- Geocode: 1712

Srei Snam District is a district of Siem Reap Province, in north western Cambodia. According to the 1998 census of Cambodia, it had a population of 26,738.

== Administrative divisions ==
The district has 6 communes and 45 villages.

Commune Code	Commune	Khmer	Village
១៧១២០១	Chrouy Neang Nguon Commune	ឃុំជ្រោយនាងងួន	ត្រុំជើង, ប្ញស្សីសាញ់, ត្រុំត្បូង, យាយម៊ីថ្មី, ស្តៅពក, អំពៅដៀប, ជ្រោយនាងងួន
១៧១២០២	Klang Hay Commune	ឃុំក្លាំងហាយ	សែ្លងតាវេត, ពង្របត់ចាន់, សែ្លងគង់, ល្បើក, សំរោង, ក្លាំងហាយ, គោកថ្កូវ,ស្លែងចាស់
១៧១២០៣	Tram Sasar	ឃុំត្រាំសសរ	នាងស្រោង, រំដេង, ធ្លក, ស្មាច់, ព្រេច, បេង, ពង្រ
១៧១២០៤	Moung Commune	ឃុំមោង	មោងត្បូង, មោងជើង, ខែ្វក, កំបោរ, ល្វា
១៧១២០៥	Prei Commune	ឃុំប្រីយ៍	ប្រីយ៍១, ប្រីយ៍២, ត្រាំសសរ, ក្របៅ, ក្រូចចារ
១៧១២០៦	Slaeng Spean Commune	ឃុំស្លែងស្ពាន	សែ្លងស្ពាន, ច្រនៀង, ភ្នំដី, ដំណាក់ដំរី, ចំការចេក, ព្រះខែ្សត, ធ្លក, ត្រាំកង់, ចារ, សាលា, រមៀត, កណ្តាល, ដង្កោ, លៀប
