= Samraong (town) =

Samraong ក្រុងសំរោង
- City
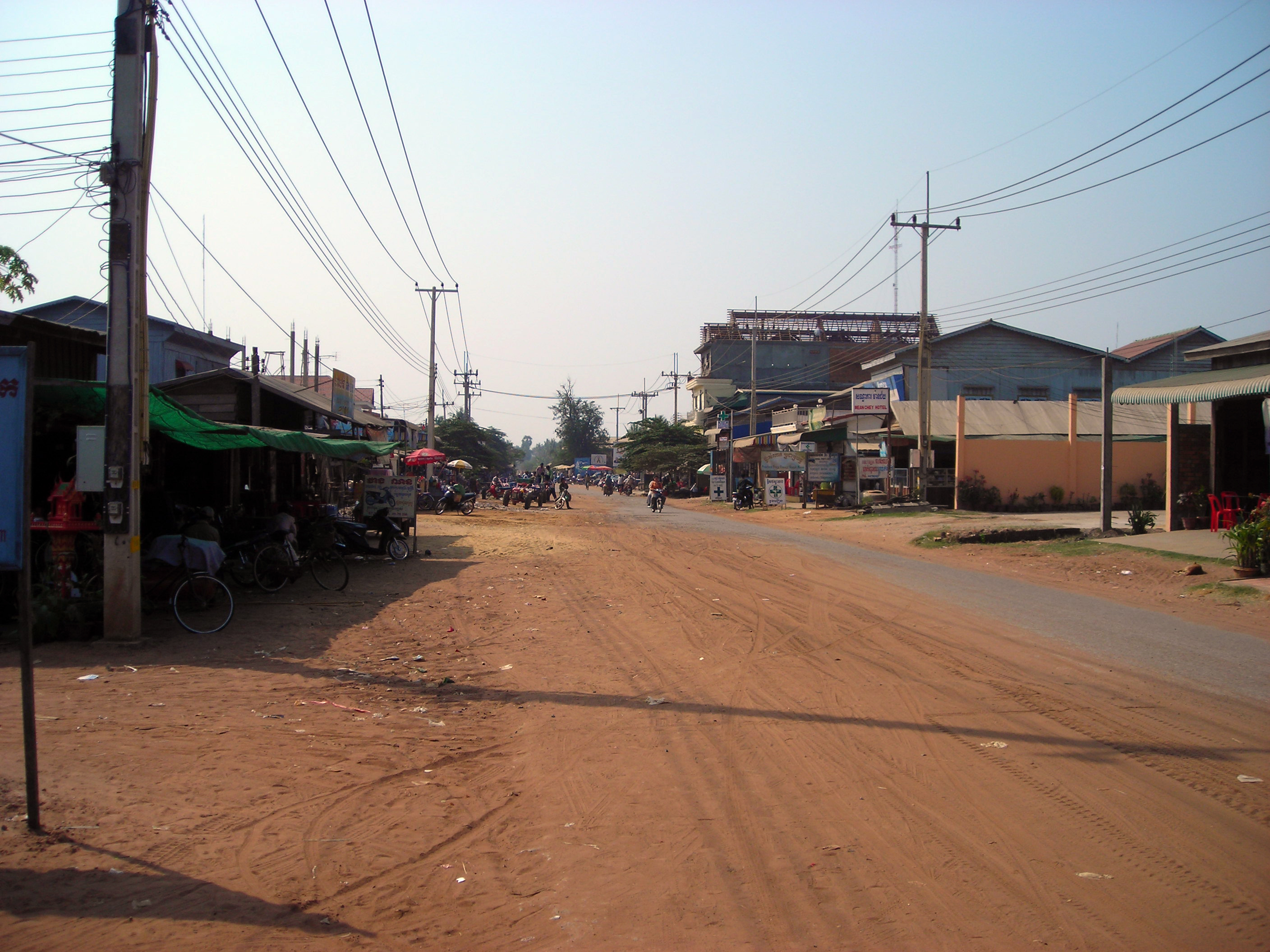
- Samraong

- Location in Cambodia
- Coordinates: 14°15′N 103°35′E
- Country: Cambodia
- Province: Oddar Meanchey
- Municipality: Samraong
- Elevation: 23 m (75 ft)

Population (2019)
  - Total: 70,944
- Time zone: UTC+7 (ICT)

Samraong (Khmer: សំរោង, pronounced [sɑm.raoŋ], lit. 'The Impenetrable jungle') is the capital of Oddar Meanchey Province in Northwestern Cambodia. To the north of the city is the border crossing at O Smach into Thailand.

== Climate ==
Climate data for Samraong (1982–2024)
Month	Jan	Feb	Mar	Apr	May	Jun	Jul	Aug	Sep	Oct	Nov	Dec	Year
Mean daily maximum °C (°F)	31.4 (88.5)	31.9 (89.4)	33.6 (92.5)	34.0 (93.2)	34.5 (94.1)	33.2 (91.8)	34.0 (93.2)	33.6 (92.5)	33.0 (91.4)	33.4 (92.1)	32.1 (89.8)	30.0 (86.0)	32.9 (91.2)
Mean daily minimum °C (°F)	20.4 (68.7)	21.7 (71.1)	21.9 (71.4)	22.4 (72.3)	24.3 (75.7)	24.0 (75.2)	23.6 (74.5)	23.4 (74.1)	22.9 (73.2)	21.7 (71.1)	20.5 (68.9)	20.0 (68.0)	22.2 (72.0)
Average precipitation mm (inches)	4.6 (0.18)	19.3 (0.76)	56.3 (2.22)	126.7 (4.99)	86.5 (3.41)	196.4 (7.73)	275.8 (10.86)	300.6 (11.83)	276.3 (10.88)	196.7 (7.74)	85.6 (3.37)	8.7 (0.34)	1,633.5 (64.31)
Source: World Meteorological Organization

== Gallery ==
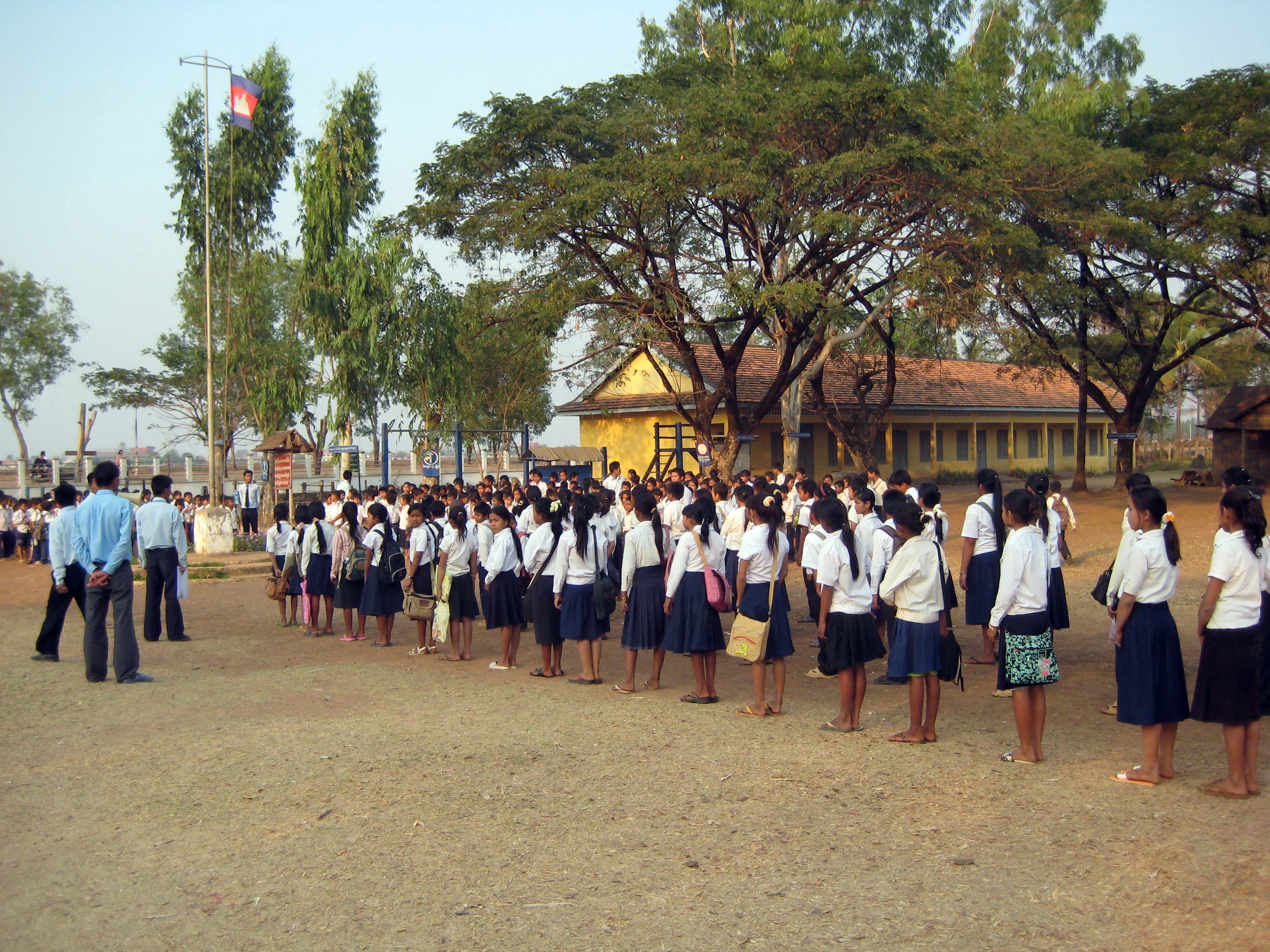
School, Samraong

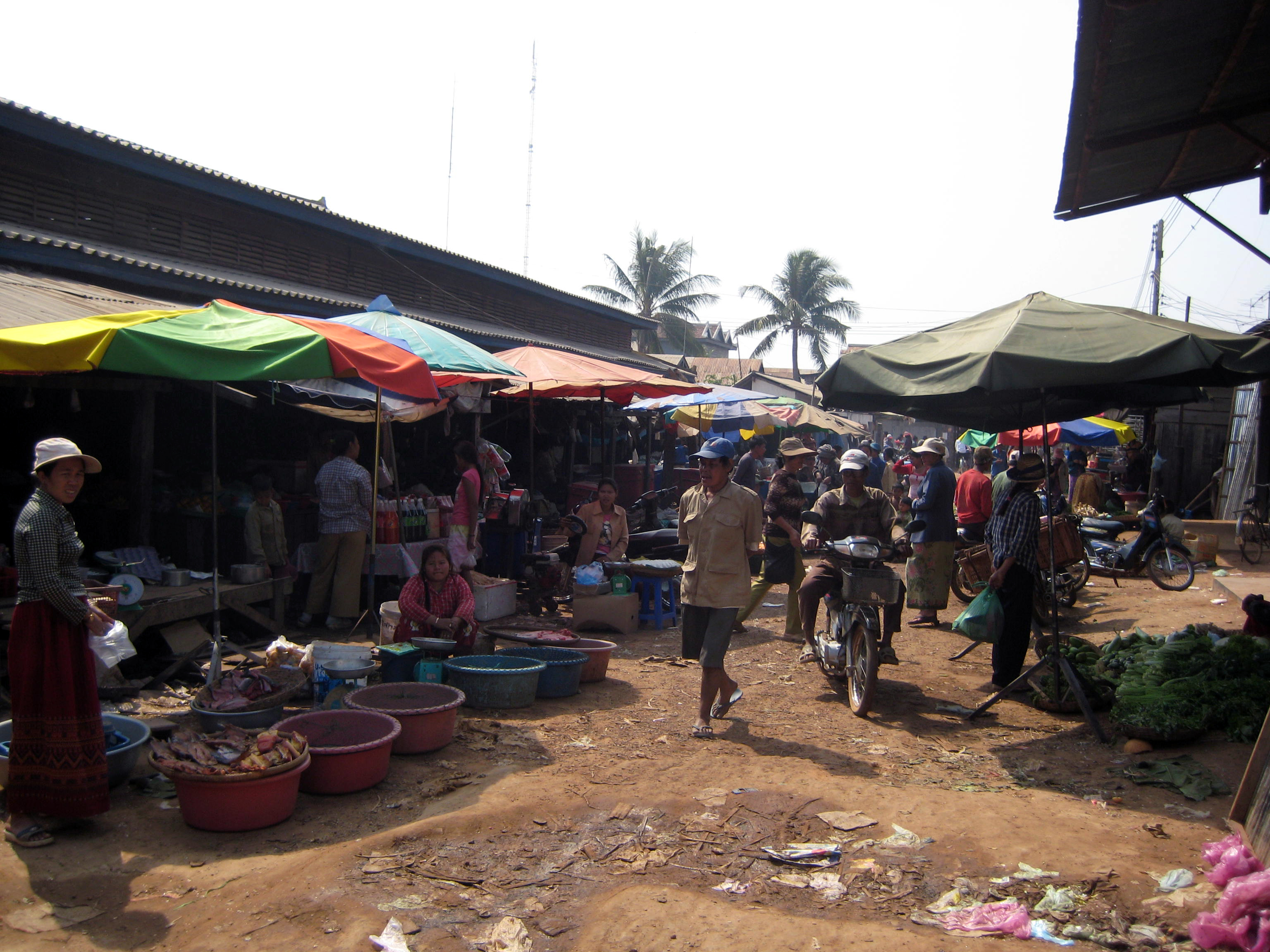
A local market

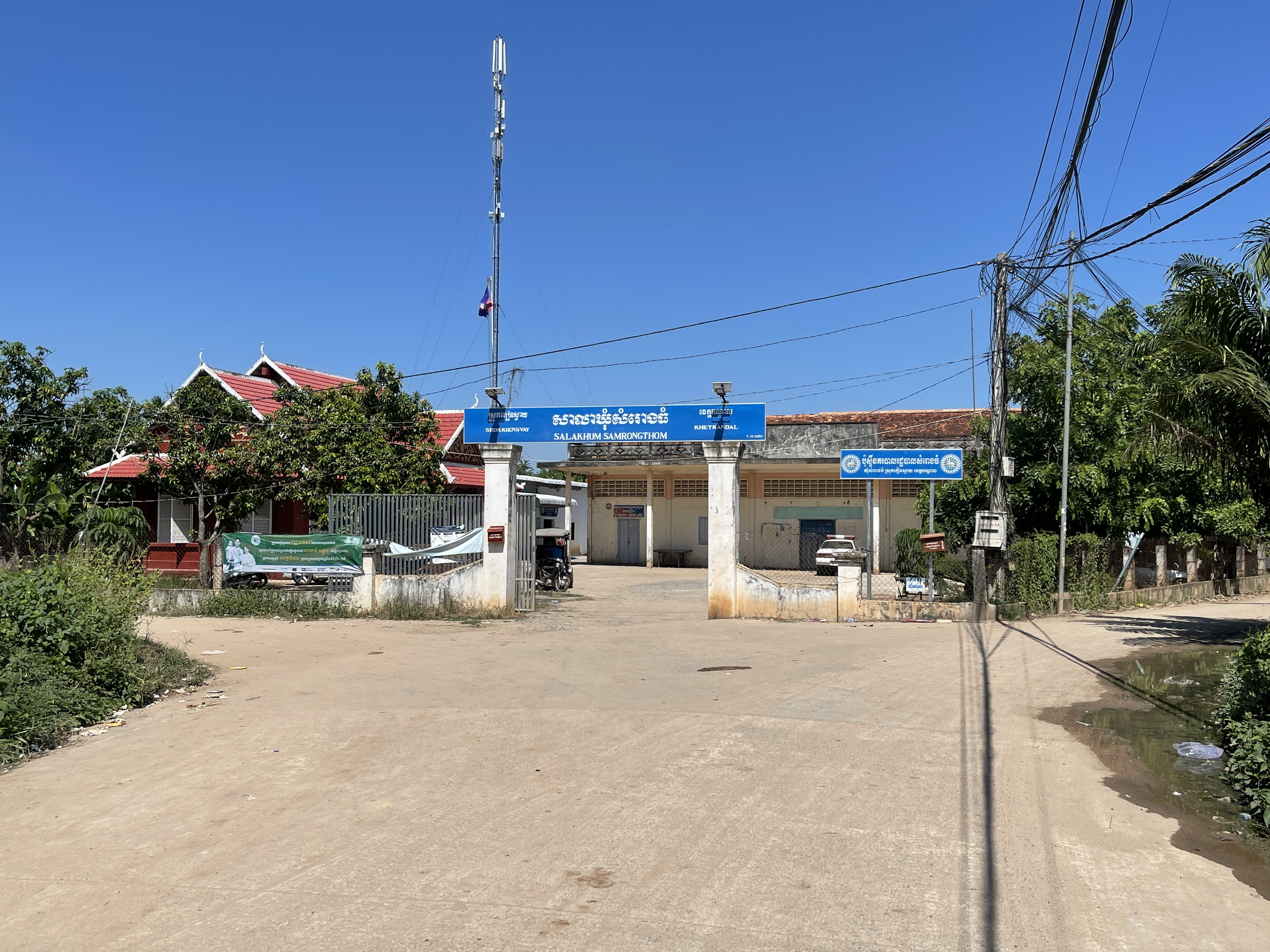
Samraong Thum Commune Hall
