= Banteay Ampil District =

Banteay Ampil បន្ទាយអំពិល
- District (srok)
- Location in Cambodia
- Coordinates: 14°15′N 103°15′E
- Country: Cambodia
- Province: Oddar Meanchey
- Time zone: +7
- Geocode: 2202

Banteay Ampil District is a district in Oddar Meanchey province in northern Cambodia. According to the 1998 census of Cambodia, it had a population of 27,075.

== Administration ==
The following table shows the villages of Banteay Ampil district by commune.

| Khum (Communes) | Phum (Villages) |
|---|---|
| Ampil | Pong Tuek, Ampil Chas, Trom, Rung Roeang, Rumduol Chas, Kdol, Baray, Yak, Pongro, Prey Voa, Kouk Ritth, Ampil Thmei, Chob Kokir Khang Kaeut, ChobKokir Khang Lech, Kouk Thum, Lbaeuk Rith, Rumduol Thmei, Prasat Rumduol, Ovlaok, Tbaeng Chas, Tbaeng Thmei, Kouk Prech, Doun Tea, Char, Trab, Sopheap, Pongro Ta Lei, Ha Leam Saenchey, Chan Krohorm Saenchey, Decho Ou Da, Rumdul Saenchey |
| Beng | Beng, Totueng Thngai, Tumnob Thmei, Prasat Lbaeuk, Pou Thmei, Prasat Bei, Voa Yeav, Pou Chas, Reangsei, Kouk Kei, Kouk Kampol, Kouk Kabbas, Kantuy Chun, Ou Rumduol, Reaksmei Souphi, Samraong Teab, Ta Ma, Tumnob Chas, Yeay Tep, Trapaeng Svay, Pur Sen Chey, Maly Stroang, Kralor Sen Chey |
| Kouk Khpos | Kouk Khpos, Prei, Keab, Chheu Slab, Tonle Sa, Thnal, Monorum, Prasat Ou Tong, Prey Totueng, Srah Srang, Bos Thom, Saen Monorom 1, Saen Monorom 2 |
| Kouk Mon | Soengh, Siliem, Kouk Mon, Roneam Thum, Sala Rang, Kanhchrieb, Kouk Svay, Kur, Prey Veaeng, Sith Serei, Ta Nes, Trapeang Ampil, Thnal Bat, Thnal Dach, Kouk Sangkaeuch, Ta Ham, Rumchek, Thma Doun, Tamoan Saenchey |

== Demography ==
The district is subdivided into 4 communes (khum) and 86 villages (phum).

== History ==
The district of Banteay Ampil holds the lesser known Chau Srei Vibol Temple. of Siem Reap located along the section of the ancient royal road that lead from Angkor to Beng Mealea
