= Oddar Meanchey province =

Province of Cambodia

Oddar Meanchey Province ខេត្តឧត្ដរមានជ័យ
- Province

Khmer transcription(s)
  - Khmer: ខេត្តឧត្ដរមានជ័យ
  - UNGEGN: Khaet Ŭdâ Mian Chĕi
  - ALA-LC: Khett Uttar Man Jăy
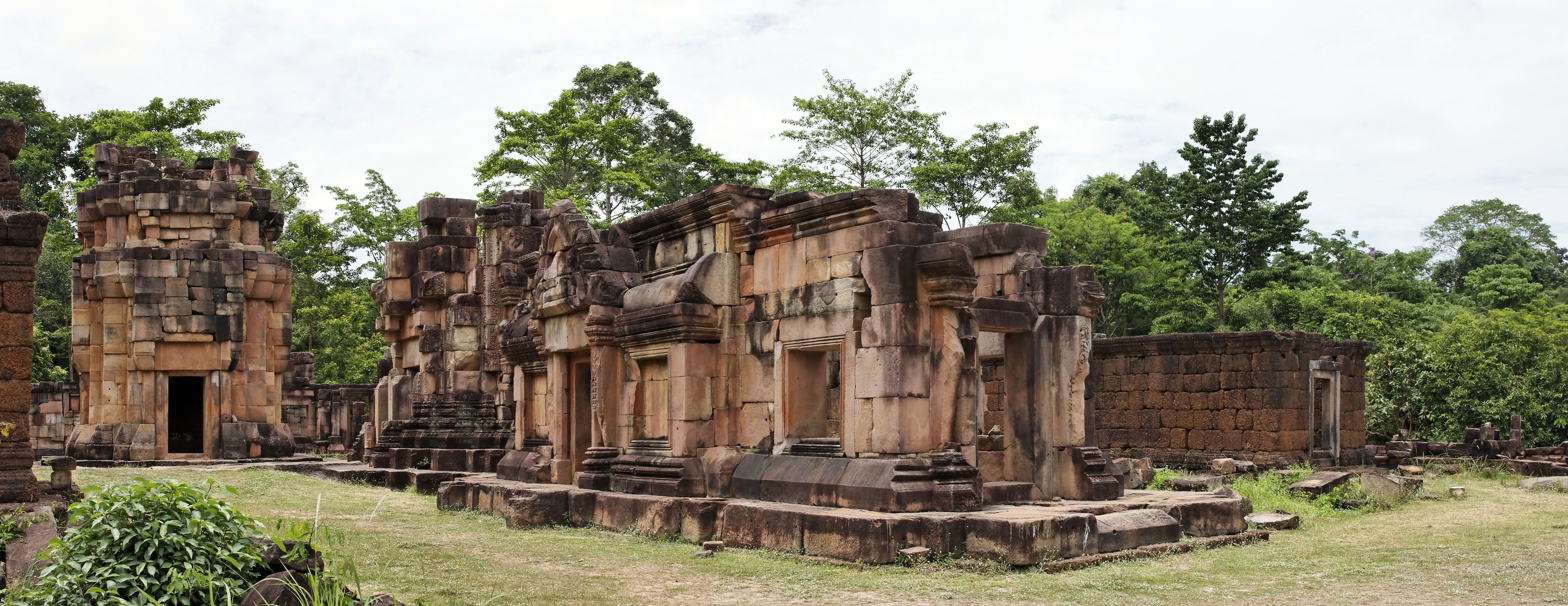
- Prasat Ta Muen Thom in Oddar Meanchey Province

- Seal

- Map of Cambodia highlighting Oddar Meanchey
- Coordinates: 14°10′N 103°30′E
- Country: Cambodia
- Provincial status: 12 July 1964
- Re-established: 27 January 1995
- Capital: Samraong
- Subdivisions: 1 municipality; 4 districts

Government
  - Governor: Mean Chanyada (CPP)
  - National Assembly: 1 / 125

Area
  - Total: 6,158 km^{2} (2,378 sq mi)
  - Rank: Ranked 13th

Population (2024)
  - Total: ▼267,203
  - Rank: 17th
  - Density: 45/km^{2} (120/sq mi)
  - Rank: 18th
- Time zone: UTC+07:00 (ICT)
- Dialing code: +855
- ISO 3166 code: KH-22

Oddar Meanchey Province (Khmer: ខេត្តឧត្ដរមានជ័យ, Khaet Ŭdâ Mian Chĕi, [ʔut.ɗɑː miən cɨj]; lit. 'victorious north') is a province of Cambodia in the remote northwest. It borders the provinces of Banteay Meanchey to the west, Siem Reap to the south and Preah Vihear to the east. Its long northern boundary demarcates part of Cambodia's international border with Thailand. The capital is Samraong. The final stronghold of Anlong Veng became the jungle headquarters of Saloth Sâr (Pol Pot) and the Khmer Rouge of Democratic Kampuchea once they rebuild their former bases in the mountainous tropical dense jungle on 18 February 1994.

The province was created on 27 April 1999, after being carved from the northern half of Siem Reap province and part of Banteay Meanchey. It existed as a province already from 1962 to 1970 under Norodom Sihanouk's Sangkum regime, but later became an administrative no-man's-land, with its status alternating between a province and a district under successive regimes.

== Administrative divisions ==
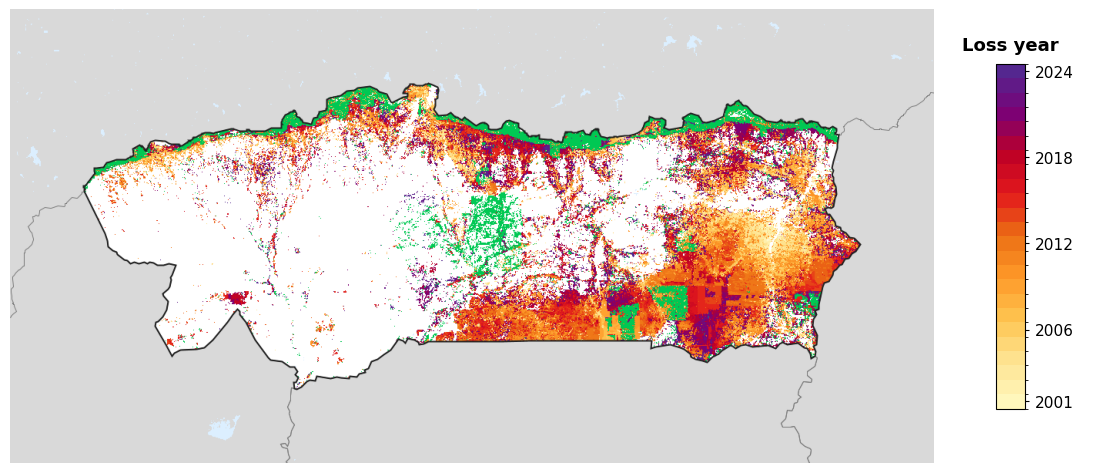
Tree-cover loss year in Oddar Meanchey, 2001-2024, from the Global Forest Change dataset.

The province is subdivided into 1 municipality (krong) and 4 districts (srok), and further subdivided into 19 communes (khum) and 5 quarters (sangkat).

ISO code	Name	Khmer	Subdivisions
— Municipality —
22-04	Samraong	សំរោង	5 sangkat
— District —
22-01	Anlong Veng	អន្លង់វែង	5 khum
22-02	Banteay Ampil	បន្ទាយអំពិល	4 khum
22-03	Chong Kal	ចុងកាល	4 khum
22-05	Trapeang Prasat	ត្រពាំងប្រាសាទ	6 khum

== Ecology ==
This province is in the Dângrêk Mountains. There is a serious problem of deforestation in the area. However, the first community-based mosaic REDD+ project in Asia was awarded Verified Carbon Standard and Climate, Community and Biodiversity Standard validation for its forest conservation work in the province.

Forest fires are common in the dry forest and there is much illegal logging as a result of economic land concessions and migrant forest encroachment.

== History ==
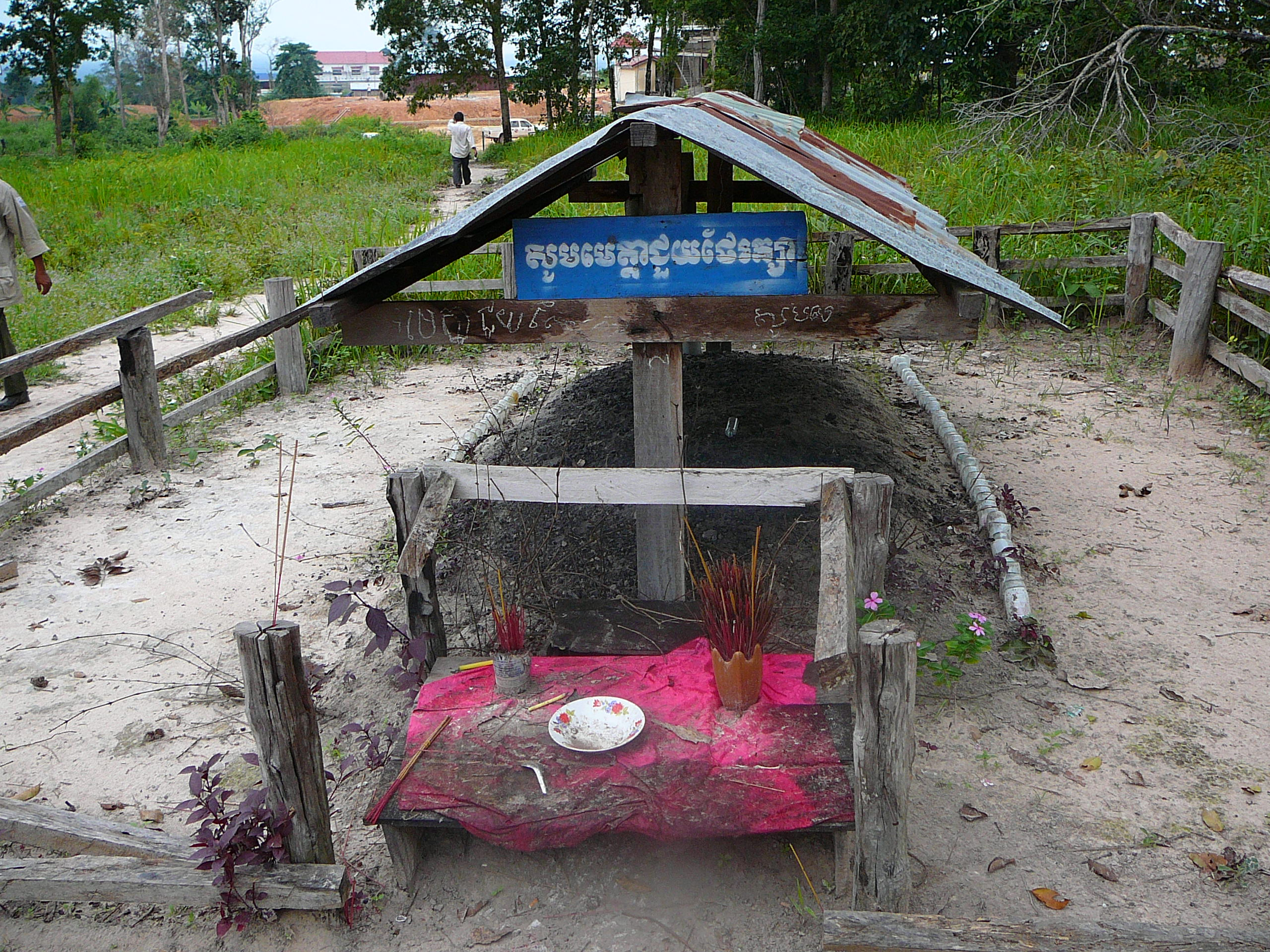
Grave of Khmer Rouge dictator Pol Pot who died in Anlong Veng in 1998.

The mountainous and forested area that now makes up Oddar Meanchey province was part of Siamese province of Monthon Isan from 1795 to 1907 under the supervision of Sangkha. After the neighboring Thai province of Inner Cambodia and Oddar Meanchey were returned to Cambodia in 1907, King Sisowath split the province into Battambang and Siem Reap (Oddar Meanchey was included with Siem Reap). Following the Franco-Thai War from 1941 to 1946 the province was under Siamese administration as Phibunsongkhram province.

The Khmer Rouge of Democratic Kampuchea led by Saloth Sâr (Pol Pot, French for Politique Potentielle) and Khieu Samphan rebuilt their former jungle bases in the Dangrek mountain range area, along the border with Thailand and made Anlong Veng their base from 1989 until 1997. Oddar Meanchey province is one of the most landmine-ridden areas in Cambodia.
