= List of schools in Cambodia =

Following is a list of non-tertiary schools in the Asian country of Cambodia. Tertiary schools are included in List of universities in Cambodia.

== Norodom Sihanouk ==
- Samdech Euv High School - schools named after Norodom Sihanouk or Norodom Sihanu Varaman.

== Schools by province ==
=== Banteay Meanchey ===
1. Prey Chan Nippon Foundation School in district O Chrov
2. Ta En Nippon Foundation School in district Mongkul Borei
3. Dang Run Nippon Foundation School in district Mongkul Borei
4. Fumiko Oshima School in district Serei Saôphôn
5. Khi Lek Nippon Foundation School in district Mongkul Borei
6. Khy Lek KDDI School in district Mongkul Borei
7. Kimiko Morisaki School No. One in district Serei Saôphôn
8. Kimiko Morisaki School No. Two in district O Chrov
9. Kork Romiet Nippon Foundation School in district Thmar Pourk
10. O Sngourt Nippon Foundation School in district Moungkul Borei
11. Phoum Kor Nippon Foundation School in district O Chrov
12. Prey Kub Nippon Foundation School in district O Chrov
13. Snourl Treit Nippon Foundation School in district O Chrov
14. Tokunori Morisaki School No. One in district Serei Saôphôn
15. Tokunori Morisaki School No. Two in district Mongkul Borei
16. Yeang Dan Kum Nippon Foundation School in district O Chrov

=== Battambang ===
- Angkor Ban Nippon Foundation School in district Sampouv Loun
- Arbor School of Hope in district Phnom Prek
- Beng Tret Nippon Foundation School in district Sampov Loun
- Boeung Ktum Nippon Foundation School in district Ratanak Mondol
- Brian Murphy School in district Sampouv Loun
- Cham Ro A Nippon Foundation School in district Mong Russei
- Chork Toch Nippon Foundation School in district Mong Russei
- Chroy Sdao Nippon Foundation School in district Thmat Kol
- Clark Hamagami School in district Koh Kralor
- Clumsy Hans School in district Thmar Kaul
- Daun Bar Nippon Foundation School in district Kas Kra Lar
- Emperor’s New Clothes School in district Sampov Lun
- Friends Without Borders School in district Battambang
- Hong Teuk Nippon Foundation School in district Phnom Prek
- Kan Tourth Nippon Foundation School in district Kas Kra Lar
- Kbal Thnal Nippon Foundation School in district Sangker
- Kilolek Bourn Nippon Foundation School in district Mong Russei
- Kok Pon Nippon Foundation School in district Kas Kra Lar
- Kompong Chamlong Nippon Foundation School in district Kamrieng
- Komprang Nippon Foundation School in district Kamrieng
- Kon Ka Ek Nippon Foundation School in district Mong Russei
- Masanori Sugihara School in district Rôtâanak Môndûl
- Mithapheap Nippon Foundation School in district Kras Krolar
- O Ampil Nippon Foundation School in district Malay
- O Cham Long Nippon Foundation School in district Kamrieng
- O Chrey Nippon Foundation School in district Kamrieng
- O Krieth Nippon Foundation School in district Mong Russei
- O Lahong Nippon Foundation School in district Phnom Prek
- O Trav Chu Nippon Foundation School in district Sampouv Loun
- Lincoln-Sudbury Memorial School in district Thmar Kaul
- Phakdei Nippon Foundation School in district Ba Nan
- Phnom Rey Nippon Foundation School in district Samlot
- Phnom Touch Nippon Foundation School in district Phnom Prek
- Phoum Kor Nippon Foundation School in district Mong Russei
- Prek Am Nippon Foundation School in district Mong Russei
- Sam Seb Nippon Foundation School in district Kamrieng
- Samlot Nippon Foundation School in district Samlot
- Santhipeap Nippon Foundation School in district Samlot
- So O Choam School in district Samlot
- Sralao Tong Nippon Foundation School in district Kamrieng
- Sre Reach Nippon Foundation School in district Samlot
- Svay Bopharam Nippon Foundation School in district Mong Russei
- Svay Sar Nippon Foundation School in district Sangker
- Ta Krey Nippon Foundation School in district Kamrieng
- Ta Sanh Nippon Foundation School in district Samlot
- Tasda Nippon Foundation School in district Sampouv Loun
- Thmor Baing Don Tret Nippon Foundation School in district Samlot
- Tinderbox School in district Kamrieng
- Wild Swans School in district Sampov Lun
- Kdol Doun Teav secondary school in district Kdol Doun Teav

=== Kampong Cham ===
- Aalborg School 2009 in district Chamkar Leu
- Aalborg School in district Thboung Khmum
- Ang Duong Academy in district Koh Sotin
- Aquas School 2 in district Dember
- Athlete's Foot School in district Krauch Chhmar
- Black Hawk School in district Memot
- Boerne School of Hope in district Krauch Chhmar
- Cambridge School in district Cheung Prey
- Chey Mongkul Nippon Foundation School in district Srey Santhor
- Cincinnati Friendship School in district Stung Trang
- Cocanour-Gaudette Family and Friends School in district Punhear Krek
- Friendship School 1 in district Damber
- Friendship School 2 in district Dember
- Gene and Nora Hahn School in district Steung Trang
- Grace Church School in Cambodia in district Srey Santhor
- Green Family School 2 in district Tbaung Khmum
- Guy Leech School in district Krauch Chhmar
- Hiroko Okuma School in district Cheung Prey
- Karl Mendel School 2 in district Batheay
- Katsuko Miyagi School in district Batheay
- Kininn and Ayzas School of Hope in district Kang Meas
- Kork Srok Nippon Foundation School in district Dambe
- Kumomo Tree One School in district Batheay
- Kumomo Tree Two School in district Batheay
- Meyers Family Friendship School in district Kampong Siem
- Milton School in district Mean
- Nakry School in district Stung Trang
- Nayoro Keiryo School in district Prey Chhor
- Nightingale-Bamford School In Cambodia in district Kampong Siem
- O Svay Nippon Foundation School in district Kang Meas
- Oconomowoc Sister School of Cambodia in district Prey Chhor
- Poly Prep Mitapeap School in district Srey Santhor
- Prek Koy School in district Kang Meas
- Ralph Raphelson School in district Chamkar Leu
- Region Rejser School No. 2 in district Chheung Prey
- Robert Kiminecz School No. 1 in district Prey Chhor
- Rosenfeld Family School in district Prey Chhor
- Sakura School in district Chamkar Leu
- Sharing Foundation School in district Batheay
- Shrenzel School in district O Raing Euv
- Sunnyside School in district Prey Chor
- Takao Onoda School in district Chhoeung Prey
- Tokatsu Espoir School in district Kampong Siem
- Toranoko School in district Cheung Prey
- Toshio Nakamura School in district Batheay
- Valerie Quirk School of Hope in district Korng Meas
- Wright Family School in district Thboung Khmum
- Kome Hyappyo (100 Sacks of Rice) School in district Batheay
- Maki School in district Chhoeung Prey
- Sozaburo and Yasuko Inoue School in district Prey Chhor
- Yamamoto and Fujimori School in district Prey Chhor

=== Kampong Chhnang ===
- Aquas School 3 in district Rolea B'ier
- Cambodia Hope School in district Boribo
- JCVA School in district Tek Phos
- Kunja School in district Kampong Leng
- Margaret & Derek Jerram School in district Boribo
- Sasaki Family School in district Boribo
- Sharon A. Enright School of Hope in district Kampong Chhnang
- Stand for Change School in district Kampong Tralach
- Trapeang Kdar School in district Kampong Tralach

=== Kampong Speu ===
- Ratanak Grady Grossman School in district Oral
- Averbach/Popkin Family School in district Barset
- Clay Alexander Carson School in district Samrong Torng
- Curtis School in district Samrong Torng
- Dahlia Sam School in district Oral
- Develo Techno School in district Phnom Srouch
- Dicheycol School in district Odong
- Duke Gandin Memorial School in district Korng Pisei
- FCC School of Peace in district Odong
- Friendship School 3 in district Phnom Srouch
- Friendship School 4 in district Phnom Srouch
- Friendship School 5 in district Korng Pisei
- Gilbert M. Cogan Memorial School in district Korng Pisei
- Hardy and McRae Families School in district Phnom Srouch
- Harold and Elizabeth M. Spector School in district Korng Pisei
- Heart To Heart School in district Phnom Sruoch
- Lux et Lex School in district Oral
- Noble Path School in district O Dong
- Paul and Deborah Kavanaugh Free Academy in district Odong
- Peace School in district Samrong Torng
- Robert Miller and James Zebrowski Memorial School in district Samrong Torng
- Salam National School of Cambodia in district Baset
- Selva Luna Escuela in district Phnom Sruoch
- Shamballa Family School in district Ba Set
- Sophia Noelle Carson School in district Phnom Sruoch
- Sweet Life School in district Tporng
- Tokyo Inspired School in district Odong
- Ulla Tullberg School in district Phnom Sruoch
- Village of English School in district Basedth
- Coconut School

=== Kampong Thom ===
- Anne M. Resnik School in district Steung Sen
- Aquas Corporation School 4 in district Baray
- Beatrice & Ralph Lau School in district Staung
- Bradley Peterson Memorial Primary School in district Santuk
- Christine and Bill School in district San Tuk
- David and Deborah Roberts School in district Kampong Svay
- Each Other School in district Stung Sen
- Hayashida Sakunoshin Memorial School in district Prasat Balling
- Joan Shapiro Learning Center in district Kampong Thom
- Kirin School in district Prasat Balling
- Kirkland-Kompong Thom Academy in district Staung
- Kozak Ohana School in district Kampong Svay
- Michael Denny and Ed Schmauss School in district Baray
- Michèle Wade Memorial School in district Kampong Svay
- Naohiro Nishiya School in district Sandann
- Neil Richards School in district Baray
- Noguchi Family School in district Baray
- O Tnaot Nippon Foundation School in district Sandan
- Pramath Dey Nippon Foundation School in district Steung Sen
- School of Hope in district Stung Sen
- Schools-One Song in district Baray
- seas Friends School of Baray in district Baray
- Sralao Torng Nippon Foundation School in district Baray
- Sre Chang Nippon Foundation School in district Sandan
- Taing Krasao Nippon Foundation School in district Sandan
- Van and Sam Khong School in district Baray
- Vielmontgomery School in district Baray
- Yokogawa Rokumaru-kai School in district Prasat Balang

=== Kampot ===
- Athlete’s Foot School in district Chhouk
- Chres School of Grace in district Kampong Trach
- Doris Dillon School in district Banteay Meas
- Edamura- Komoro Hawaii School in district Kampong Trach
- Edison School in district Banteay Meas
- Freshfields School in district Banteay Meas
- Irene Pearson Bleha School in district Angkor Chey
- Kampong Trach School in district Kampong Trach
- Kuniko Koyama School in district Chhouk
- Louise M. Scarola School in district Chhouk
- Nowlen Family School Two in district Kampot
- Phnom Touch KDDI School in district Dang Tong
- Soma School in district Banteay Meas
- Steve & Mary Enterkin School in district Kampong Trach
- Sunrise School in district Banteay Meas
- Texas Peak School in district Chhouk
- Tokyo 2007 Marathon School in district Banteay Meas
- World Mate School Number Five in district Kampot

=== Kandal ===
- ACIS School in district Takhmao
- Aloha School in district Koh Thom
- An Dóchas School in district Kandal Steung
- Bel Canto School in district Kandal Steung
- Bob and Bernice School in district Khsach Kandal
- Chiaki Higono School in district Kandal Steung
- David Hughes School in district Kandal Steung
- Douglas & Vivienne Kenrick School in district Khsach Kandal
- Firefly School in district Lovea Em
- Grijalva Family & Friends School in district Kandal Steung
- Hiroko Shinno School in district Ksach Kandal
- ht Future Kids Home (complex) in district Kien Svay
- Jewish Helping Hands School In Memory of Barry R. Soffin in district Lovea Em
- Karl Mendel School in district Kien Svay
- Koh Khel Middle School – A Global Playground School in district Sa-ang
- Koh Knol Aloha School in district Kandal Steung
- Lotus School in district Khsach Kandal
- Nightingale School in district Ang Snuol
- Norodom Sihanouk School in district Kandal Steung
- Phnom Dei KEC School in district Ang Snuol
- President Barack Hussein Obama School in district Ang Snoul
- Prof. Raymond B. Cattell School in district Khsach Kandal
- Raymond T. Holton School in district Kandal Steung
- Richard Copaken School in district Angk Snuol
- Rideaid School in district Khsach Kandal
- Ridgewood Village School in district Khsach Kandal
- Sanlong KEC School in district Ksach Kandal
- Sayuri Watanabe School in district Kandal Stung
- Shinohara, Aono and SI East Ehime School in district Kandal Steung
- Shyam & Rajni Bajpai School in district Takhmao
- Willowbrook School in district Kandal Steung
- Zahn School in district Kien Svay

=== Kep ===
- Simon Harton Lewis School in district Damnak Chang-eur
- Son Sann School in district Damnak Chang-eur

=== Koh Kong ===
- Aoba School in district Sre Ambel
- Harris Family School in district Kompong Sela
- Humanity School For Young Cambodians in district Botumsakor
- Jack Bora Feeney School in district Kompong Sela
- John F. & Sautiavale Killian School in district Sre Ambel
- Kirivorn School in district Kompong Seila
- Masako Suiko School#2 in district Botom Sakor
- Mortgage Force School in district Kampong Seila
- Samdech Ta Nippon Foundation School in district Kampong Seila
- Sir Graham Balfour School in district Thmar Bang
- Ta Thorng Nippon Foundation School in district Sre Ambel
- Thnal Bombek Nippon Foundation School in district Kampong Seila
- Tokyo Katsushika-Higashi Rotary Club in district Sre Ambel
- Walter Kissinger Family School in district Sre Ambel
- Yukiko Ukai School in district Sre Ambel

=== Kompong Cham ===
- Kome Hyappyo (100 Sacks of Rice) School in district Batheay
- Maki School in district Chhoeung Prey
- Sozaburo and Yasuko Inoue School in district Prey Chhor
- Yamamoto and Fujimori School in district Prey Chhor

=== Kompong Chhnang ===
- Ann Morrison School in district Tek Phos
- Lvea School in district Kompong Leng
- World Mate School Number Three in district Kompong Leng

=== Kompong Speu ===
- George Mrus School in district Oral
- Lily School in district Samrong Torng
- Louise Zlatic Kielbik School in district Tpong
- O Tapong Nippon Foundation School in district Basit
- Pearl and Mary Flanders School in district O Ral
- Pothipreuk Nippon Foundation School in district Phnom Sruoch
- Roberts Family School in district O Ral
- Shinohara Manabu School in district Udong
- Tokyo-West Rotary Club School in district Phnom Srouch
- Violet Atkinson School in district O Ral

=== Kompong Thom ===
- David Nathan Meyerson School in district Stoung
- Diane Daniel School in district Stoung
- Graphis School in district Staung
- "With Love from Hokkaido” School in district Prasat Balling
- Kumiko Koyama School 2 in district Staung
- Kuniko Uchida-Kato School in district Stoung
- Miyazaki Honten School in district Stoung
- Srei Devata School in district Baray
- World Mate School Number Two in district Stoung

=== Kratie ===
- Chroy Banteay Nippon Foundation School in district Prek Prasob
- Damrei Phong Nippon Foundation School in district Chhlong
- Dodge School in district Chhlaung
- Doun Meas Nippon Foundation School in district Snoul
- Ezer & Andy School in district Snuol
- Hans Christian Andersen School I in district Sambo
- Jeff Pahutski Memorial School in district Chhlaung
- John Burroughs Snuol School in district Snuol
- Kampong Sre Nippon Foundation School in district Chhlong
- Little Mermaid School in district Sambo
- O Tanoeng Nippon Foundation School in district Sambo
- Rokar Thom Nippon Foundation School in district Prek Prasob
- Sampong Nippon Foundation School in district Kratie
- Sandan II Nippon Foundation School in district Sam Bo
- Soroptimist International of Osaka-Chuo School in district Snuol
- Thnout Nippon Foundation School in district Kratie

=== Mondolkiri ===
- Prech School in district Pech Chenda
- Non No School in district Picheada
- Ascham School Community in district O Raing
- Ascham School in district Sen Monorom
- Cobbitty School in district Pech Chenda
- Elizabeth Rinehart Ohrstrom School in district Sen Monorom
- Hiroko Kato School in district Picheada
- Masako Suiko School in district Oreang
- O Te Nippon Foundation School in district Keo Seima
- Sre Chrey Nippon Foundation School in district Koh Nhek
- Sre Preah KEC school in district Keo Seima
- Suiryo School in district O Raing

=== Oddar Meanchey ===
- Donum Amicitiae School in district Chong Kal
- Preah Kun (Grace) School in district Chong Kal

=== Pailin ===
- Bor Tangsuor Nippon Foundation School in district Pailin
- Bor Yakhar Nippon Foundation School in district Pailin
- Knights of Cambodia School in district Sala Krao
- Kon Phnom Nippon Foundation School in district Salakrao
- Overlake School in district Pailin
- Phnom Koy Nippon Foundation School in district Salakrao
- Rattanak Sophorn Nippon Foundation School in district Pailin
- Suon Ampov Leu Nippon Foundation School in district Pailin

=== Phnom Penh ===
International Schools:

- Harrods International Academy - Offers IEYC, IPC, CLSP, Khmer, Cambridge IGCSE Curriculum.
- CIA FIRST International School of Phnom Penh (CIA FIRST)
- International School of Phnom Penh (ISPP) – Offers the International Baccalaureate (IB) program.
- Northbridge International School Cambodia (NISC) – Follows the IB curriculum.
- Canadian International School of Phnom Penh (CIS) – Offers an Alberta, Canada curriculum.
- ZISPP (Zaman International School) – Offers international curriculums.
- DK SchoolHouse - Scandinavian based teaching

Local Schools:

- Bak Touk High School – A prominent public school.
- Preah Sisowath High School – One of the oldest public high schools.

=== Preah Sihanouk ===
- Peter Ehrenhaft School in district Krong Preah Sihanouk
- Samdech Euv KDDI School in district Krong Preah Sihanouk

=== Preah Vihear ===
- Duncan and Virginia Holthausen School in district Rovieng
- Bank Street School of Cambodia in district Rovieng
- Brad Washburn School in district Ro Vieng
- Brookline Samlahn School in district Sangkum Thmei
- Daniele Derossi School in district Choâm Ksant
- Dixon Learning Center in district Ro Vieng
- Dyer Family Friendship School in district Tbeng Meanchey
- Elaine and Nicholas Negroponte School in district Rôvieng
- Flavia Robinson School in district Choâm Ksant
- Gertrude M. Parker and Beatrice S. Leong School in district Kulen
- Guido A. & Elizabeth H. Binda Foundation School in district Choâm Ksant
- House of Joy and Happiness in district Rovieng
- Ian Tilden School in district Choam Ksan
- Jim and Eileen Wilson School in district Tbeng Meanchey
- Kampot Nippon Foundation School in district Rovieng
- Kate and Elizabeth Wiener School in district Kulen
- Kazuko Nishie School in district Tobia Meanchey
- Marjorie and Elwood Malos School in district Rovieng
- O Ta Lok Nippon Foundation School in district Rovieng
- Passport School in district Sangkum Thmei
- Phom O KEC School in district Rovieng
- Piero Derossi School in district Choâm Ksant
- Rom Chek Nippon Foundation School in district Rovieng
- Rom Chek Nippon Foundation School in district Rovieng
- Sre Thom Nippon Foundation School in district Rovieng
- St. Paul's School of Hope in district Sangkum Thmei
- Thkeng Nippon Foundation School in district Rovieng
- Tokyo Shintoshin Rotary Club School in district Rôvieng
- Wakako Hironaka School in district Rôvieng
- Yokkaichi School in district Rovieng
- Yutaka Araki School in district Tbeng Meanchey
- Bellingham Community School in district Rovieng

=== Prey Veng ===
- Alvash and Betsy Dearth School in district Kampong Trabek
- Arthur Ochs Sulzberger Family School in district Peam Ror
- Bernie Krisher School in district Peam Chor
- Brighter Tomorrow School in district Pearaing
- Cambodia Portledge School in district Kanhchreach
- Diana and Al Kaff School in district Peam Chor
- Florida Gulf Coast University Lower Secondary School in district Kamchay Mear
- FordHarrison School in district Preah Sdach
- Friends of Judith Wolf School in district Pearaing
- Ida M. Holtsinger School in district Sithor Kandal
- JABS Family School in district Kampong Trabek
- Jaimie Sheth and Chi Tran School in district Kamchay Mear
- Janna Roeters (2000-08-25) School in district Pearaing
- John Coats School in district Me Sang
- John's School in district Peam Chor
- Ka Hale Kula Ānuenue School in district Kampong Leav
- Kazue and Hiroshi Sasaki School in district Preah Sdach
- Khut Chhorn Memorial School in district Bar Phnom
- Kristof School in district Peam Ror
- Lee Rudlin School in district Preah Sdach
- Lilies of Hope School in district Por Rieng
- Mary Helen Smith School in district Peam Ro
- Morris and Shirley Weinstein School in district Bar Phnom
- Paul Singh School in district Peam Chor
- POE School in district Kampong Leav
- Prey Kanlaong Village School in district Kampong Leav
- QA School in district Preah Sdach
- Richard Teo School in district Sithor Kandal
- Rieko Yano School in district Kompong Trabek
- Ronald Winston School in district Pearaing
- Santori School in district Sithor Kandal
- SOIS School of Hope in district Kamchay Mear
- Spean School in district Kampong Trabek
- Teruko Saito School in district Ba Phnum
- Uncle Mark Lutz School in district Prey Veng
- World Mate School Number Ten in district Pearaing
- World Mate School Number One in district Peam Ro
- Youthevong School in district Sithor Kandal

=== Pursat ===
- Alexander Brest School in district Bakan
- Anlong Kray Nippon Foundation School in district Bakan
- Credit Suisse-First Boston School in district Bakan
- CREDO School in district Bakan
- Ryan F. Waldron School in district Phnom Kravanh
- Janie’s School in district Bakan
- Kdey Krav Nippon Foundation School in district Sampouv Meas
- Koh Rumdori Nippon Foundation School in district Kra Kot
- Lefkowitz Family School in district Bakan
- Prey Kub Nippon Foundation School in district Phnom Kravanh
- Prey Roung Nippon Foundation School in district Bakan
- Prey Svay Nippon Foundation School in district Bakan
- Princess and the Pea School in district Kandieng
- Ro Bas Raing Nippon Foundation School in district Bakan
- Sam Rong Nippon Foundation School in district Phnom Kravang
- Serey School in district Krakor
- Talo Nippon Foundation School in district Bakan

=== Ratanakiri ===
- 100 Friends School in district O Ya Dav
- Adler Family School in district Lumphat
- Caramanico School in district Koun Mom
- Develo School No. One in district Andoung Meas
- Develo School No. Two in district Koan Mom
- Ezra Vogel School in district Banlung
- Gloria and Henry Jarecki Special Skills School in district O Chum
- Hqs. Building/Library in district O Chum
- Mustafa Saeed Rahman School in district O Chum
- Jack and Helen King School in district Koun Mom
- Josef and Maria Baumann School in district Koun Mom
- Kamata Family School in district Kaun Mom
- Keizo School in district Bar Keo
- Mary Huston Schuyler School in district Bar Keo
- Miki Group Cattleya School in district Lumphat
- Morris and Phyllis Gold School in district O Chum
- Mr. and Mrs. Sak Nhep School in district Lum Phat
- Nicholas and Zachary Poor School in district Koan Mom
- Nicholas Palevsky School in district Koan Mom
- Patrick and Jackie Donnelly School in district Bo Keov
- Preap Sar (Dove) School in district O Chum
- Rainbow School in district Lumphat
- Ruth G. Kimball School in district O Chum
- Sapporo Acasia Lions Club School in district Koan Mom
- Sean McDonald School in district O Ya Dav
- Sophie A. Krasowski School in district O Ya Dav
- Star Fire Flower Foundation School in district Voeunsai
- Wendy Stedman Banbury School in district Voeun Sai
- Alkire Family School in district O Chum
- Honolulu-Pusan-Shimbashi-Taipei Rotary Clubs School in district Ban Lung
- World Mate School Number Eight in district Kon Mom
- World Mate School Number Seven in district Bo Keo

=== Siem Reap ===
- Aeon Bougainvillea School in district Sotr Nikum
- Aeon Delonix School in district Sotr Nikum
- Aeon Jackfruit School in district Pourk
- Aeon Jasminum School in district Chi Kreng
- Aeon Lime School in district Chi Kreng
- Aeon Lychee School in district Chi Kreng
- Aeon Mango School in district Pourk
- Aeon Orange School in district Chi Kreng
- Aeon Papaya School in district Chi Kreng
- Aeon Rain Tree School in district Sotr Nikum
- Andrea School in district Saut Nikum
- ASIJ School in district Svay Leu
- Bob and Ruth Shapiro School in district Prasat Bakong
- Brigitte and Michael Rennie School in district Kralanh
- Butterfly Effect School in district Srey Snom
- Chippewa School in district Angkor Chum
- Chop KDDI School in district Siem Reap
- Engelstoft Family and Friends School in district Soutr Nikom
- Engelstoft Family School in district Pouk
- Hikari School in district Kralanh
- International School of Siem Reap in Siem Reap
- Royal American International School in Siem Reap
- Keishi Hasegawa School in district Chikreng
- Kimino Yume Mezaseba Kanau School in district Varin
- Meyers Family School in district Chikreng
- Mirai Step School in district Srey Snom
- Miss Kayoko Higuchi School in district Saut Nikum
- Monique Brousseau School in district Chikreng
- Nozomi School in district Saut
- Oneness-Family School in district Banteay Srey
- PEPY Ride School in district Kralanh
- PPSEAWA Hawaii Cambodia School in district Sotr Nikom
- Princess 1 School in district Saut Nikum
- Princess 1 School in district Saut Nikum
- Princess 2 School in district Banteay Srey
- Pulliam-Ar-Lao-Shuford (P.A.L.S) School in district Kralanh
- R.S. Rosenfeld School in district Banteay Srey
- Region Rejser School 3 in district Kralanh
- Reiko and Seiichi Kanise School in district Angkor Chum
- Rev. Kenneth Shull School in district Pouk
- Sage Insights School in district Pouk
- Scrum School in district Angkor Chum
- Seng Kheang School in district Siem Reap
- Stefan Ellis School in district Siem Reap
- Tatsuo Maruyama School in district Cheykreng
- Vineyard School in district Siem Reap
- Wartell/Salomon School in district Chikreng
- World Mate School Number Nine in district Srey Snam

=== Sihanoukville ===
- Bangkok Airways School in district Prey Noup
- Dorothy and Saul Katz School in district Prey Nob
- Kome Hyappyo (100 Sacks of Rice) School No. Two in district Prey Nob
- Morota and Sato School in district Prey Noup
- Nowlen Family School One in district Prey Nob
- Puerto Rico School in district Prey Noup
- Region Rejser School No. 1 in district Prey Noup
- Rotary Centennial School No. 1 in district Prey Noup
- Rotary Centennial School No. 2 in district Prey Noup
- Seattle-Sihanoukville Friendship School in district Prey Nob
- Taiko Iwase School in district Khan Prey Nup

=== Stung Treng ===
- Stung Treng School in district Stung Treng
- Calean Maria School in district Siem Book
- Elizabeth A. Ross School in district Stung Treng
- Fred White Memorial School in district Sesan
- IROHA School in district Thala Barivat
- Lyhou School in district Thala Barivat
- O Meah School in district Siem Book
- PEPY Friends School in district Siem Bouk
- Siem Bok Nippon Foundation School in district Siem Bok
- Thelma F. Raffensperger School in district Sesan

=== Svay Rieng ===
- Akiko Okayama School in district Kampong
- Chhleu Teal KDDI School in district Svay Chrom
- Eugene Katz School in district Svay Theab
- Hun Sen Prasot School in district Svay Teab
- Svay Rieng School in district Svay Rieng
- Hawaii Ohana School in district Svay Chrom
- JC Hosken School of Peace in district Rumduol
- Kikkoman School in district Svay Chrom
- Osamu and Noriko Sugita School in district Romeas Hek
- Other Guys School in district Romeas Heik
- Rachel Trout and Emma Tate School in district Romeas Heik
- Sophy Joy Berry and Mark Sopha Berry School in district Romdoul
- Yoon Soon Jung School in district Chantrear

=== Takéo ===
Name	Location
Aileen Brandt School	Bati District
Rita Hochhauser School	Bati District
Snyder Family School	Bati District
Yeam Khao KDDI School	Bati District
Wahrenbrock Family School	Kaoh Andaet District
Green Family School	Kiri Vong District
Michael and Gail Yanney School	Kiri Vong District
Because of Christ Academy]]	Prey Kabbas District
Bernie Krisher School 2	Prey Kabbas District
Blue Jay School	Samraŏng District
Frances Fong Wong School	Tram Kak District
Marais Family School	Tram Kak District
Moeung Char Nippon Foundation School	Tram Kak District
Therese The Little Flower School	Tram Kak District
Tith Mom School	Tram Kak District
Vasaskolan School	Tram Kak District
Aquas School	Treang District
Hazel Abell Stone School	Treang District
Prey Pdao Nippon Foundation School	Treang District
Sok An Prey Sandek High School	Treang District
Sok An Sanlong High School	Treang District
Tye Family School	Treang District

=== Uddar Meanchey ===
- O Koki Kandal School in district Anlong Veng
- Alex and Lily Talarico School in district Samrong
- Charles B. Wang – Computer Associates School No. One in district Samrong
- Charles B. Wang – Computer Associates School No. Two in district Samrong
- Chhe Teal Chrum Nippon Foundation School in district Anlong Veng
- Ta Dav Nippon Foundation School in district Anlong Veng
- Trabek Nippon Foundation School in district Samrong
- World Mate School Number Four in district Samrong
- World Mate School Number Six in district Anlong Veng

== See also ==
- Education in Cambodia
- Lists of schools
