= Kang Meas district =

Kang Meas ស្រុកកងមាស
- District (srok)
- Location in Cambodia
- Coordinates: 11°56′35″N 105°16′14″E
- Country: Cambodia
- Province: Kampong Cham
- Communes: 11
- Villages: 93

Population (1998)
  - Total: 91,212
- Time zone: +7
- Geocode: 0307

Kang Meas (Khmer: ស្រុកកងមាស, lit. 'The Golden Ring') is a district (srok) located in Kampong Cham province, Cambodia. The district capital is Peam Chi Kang town located some 13 kilometres south of the town of Prey Toteung on National Highway 7 and is 110 kilometres by road from Phnom Penh. National road 70 provides access to the district from the highway and meets provincial road 223 at the district capital. This long relatively narrow district parallels the northern bank of the Mekong for about 40 kilometres between Kampong Cham (city) and Mukh Kampul district in Kandal province. As the district is low-lying, much of the land area of the district is inundated when the Mekong rises during the wet season.

== History ==
Between 1974 and 1978, two pagodas (wat in Khmer) in Kang Meas district were used as prisons and killing fields by the Khmer Rouge. According to a mapping team who surveyed the region in 1995 and 1996 Wat O Trau Kuon and Wat Nikroath in Peam Chi Kang commune were used as a district prison and regional prison respectively. O Trau Kuon was the main Democratic Kampuchea district prison from 1974 until 1978. Initial victims at this site were soldiers from the army of Lon Nol and then New People who were brought to Kang Meas District from Phnom Penh. Victims were executed at the mass graves close to the Wat. District authorities reported 467 mass graves at this site and estimated that 32,690 victims were executed there. The graves were excavated in 1982 and the remains placed in a memorial stupa near the pagoda.

Wat Nikroath was used as a prison from 1975 when New People were invited to the pagoda to receive food. They were then imprisoned and later executed. District officials recorded 186 mass graves at the site containing an estimated 11,160 victims. Monks from the pagoda reported that they have found names written in blood on the walls when they returned after the fall of the Khmer Rouge. These have now been covered with fresh paint.

== Location ==
Kang Meas district is in south western Kampong Cham Province. Reading from the north clockwise, Kang Meas shares a border with Cheung Prey and Prey Chhor districts to the north and the district of Kampong Siem to the east. The Mekong River forms the southern boundary of the district and the district boundary includes the river itself to midstream. The Mekong island of Kaoh Andaet is also part of the district. Across the river to the south are Koh Southin and Srei Santhor districts. To the east are Ksach Kandal and Mukh Kampul districts of Kandal province and Batheay district of Kampong Cham to the north east.

== Administration ==
The Kang Meas district governor reports to Hun Neng, the Governor of Kampong Cham. The following table shows the villages (phum) of Kang Meas district by commune (khum).

ឃុំ (commune)	ភូមិ (villages)
Angkor Ban	Angkor Ban Ti Muoy(អង្គរបានទី ១), Angkor Ban Ti Pir(អង្គរបានទី ២), Angkor Ban Ti Bei(អង្គរបានទី ៣), Angkor Ban Ti Buon(អង្គរបានទី ៤), Angkor Ban Ti Pram(អង្គរបានទី ៥), Angkor Ban Ti Prammuoy(អង្គរបានទី ៦), Angkor Ban Ti Prampir(អង្គរបានទី ៧), Angkor Ban Ti Prambei(អង្គរបានទី ៨), Angkor Ban Ti Prambuon(អង្គរបានទី ៩)
Kang Ta Noeng	Kang Ta Noeng Ti Muoy(កងតាណឹងទី ១), Kang Ta Noeng Ti Pir(កងតាណឹងទី ២), Kang Ta Noeng Ti Bei(កងតាណឹងទី ៣), Kang Ta Noeng Ti Buon(កងតាណឹងទី ៤), Kang Ta Noeng Ti Pram(កងតាណឹងទី ៥), Kang Ta Noeng Ti Prammuoy(កងតាណឹងទី ៦), Kang Ta Noeng Ti Prampir(កងតាណឹងទី ៧), Kang Ta Noeng Ti Prambei(កងតាណឹងទី ៨), Kang Ta Noeng Ti Prambuon(កងតាណឹងទី ៩)
Khchau	Thlok Chrov(ថ្លុកជ្រៅ), Svay Poan Ti Muoy(ស្វាយពាន់ទី ១), Svay Poan Ti Pir(ស្វាយពាន់ទី ២), Ou Popel(អូពពេល), Khchau Ti Muoy(ខ្ចៅទី ១), Khchau Ti Pir(ខ្ចៅទី ២), Khchau Ti Bei(ខ្ចៅទី ៣), Varint Ti Muoy(វ៉ារិន្ទទី ១), Varint Ti Pir(វ៉ារិន្ទទី ២), Varint Ti Bei(វ៉ារិន្ទទី ៣)
Peam Chi Kang	Damnak Chrey(ដំណាក់ជ្រៃ), Damnak Svay(ដំណាក់ស្នាយ), Peam Chi Kang(ពាមជីកង), Sach Sour(សាច់សួរ), Sambuor Meas Ka(សំបួរមាស "ក"), Sambuor Meas Kha(សំបួរមាស "ខ"), Kaoh Touch(កោះតូច)
Preaek Koy	Preaek Koy(ព្រែកកុយ), Anlong Kokir(អន្លង់គគី), Kong Chey(គងជ័យ), Koher(គហ៊េរ), Me Sar(មេសរ), Ou Svay Lech(អូស្វាយលិច), Ou Svay Kaeut(អូស្វាយកើត)
Preaek Krabau(ព្រែកក្របៅ)	Pou Sala Ti Muoy(ពោធិសាលាទី ១), Pou Sala Ti Pir(ពោធិសាលាទី ២), Peam Knong(ពាមក្នុង), Preaek Andoung(ព្រែកអណ្ដូង), Preaek Krabau(ព្រែកក្របៅ), Ou Kandaol(អូរកណ្ដោល), Andoung Ta Ong(អណ្ដូងតាអុង), Andoung Dai(អណ្ដូងដៃ), Tuek Chenh(ទឹកចេញ), Chamkar Ovloek(ចំការឪឡឹក)
Reay Pay	Kanlaeng Run(កន្លែងរុន), Boeng Totea(បឹងទទា), Tuol Vihear(ទួលវិហារ), Tuol Bei(ទួលបី), Reay Pay Leu(រាយប៉ាយលើ), Reay Pay Kraom(រាយប៉ាយក្រោម), Preaek Pranak(ព្រែកប្រណាក), Kok Krabei(គកក្របី)
Roka ar(រកាអារ)	Preaek Liv Ti Muoy(ព្រែកលីវទី ១), Preaek Liv Ti Pir(ព្រែកលីវទី ២), Preaek Liv Ti Bei(ព្រែកលីវទី ៣), Preaek Liv Ti Buon(ព្រែកលីវទី ៤), Chrouy Krabau Ti Muoy(ជ្រោយក្របៅទី ១), Chrouy Krabau Ti Pir(ជ្រោយក្របៅទី ២), Svay Sranaoh Ti Muoy(ស្វាយស្រណោះទី ១), Svay Sranaoh Ti Pir(ស្វាយស្រណោះទី ២), Roka ar(រកាអារ)
Roka Koy	Roka Koy Ka(រកាគយ "ក"), Roka Koy Kha(រកាគយ "ខ"), Phum Thmei Ka(ភូមិថ្មី "ក"), Phum Thmei Kha(ភូមិថ្មី "ខ"), Pongro(ពង្រ), Svay Ta Haen(ស្វាយតាហែន), Damnak L'et(ដំណាក់ល្អិត)
Sdau	Khpob Leu(ខ្ពបលើ), Khpob Kraom(ខ្ពបក្រោម), Sdau(ស្ដៅ), Lvea Leu(ល្វាលើ), Lvea Kraom(ល្វាក្រោម), Anlong Kokir(អន្លង់គគីរ)
Sour Kong	Kaoh Ta Ngao Ti Muoy(កោះតាង៉ោទី ១), Kaoh Ta Ngao Ti Pir(កោះតាង៉ោទី ២), Kaoh Ta Ngao Ti Bei(កោះតាង៉ោទី ៣), Boeng Sang Kaeut(បឹងសាងកើត), Boeng Sang Lech(បឹងសាងលិច), Kdei(ក្ដី), Souken(សូរគេន), Boeng Trav(បឹងត្រាវ), Preaek Kruos(ព្រែកគ្រួស), Anlong Ak Lech(អន្លង់អកលិច), Anlong Ak Kaeut(អន្លង់អកកើត)

== Demographics ==
The district is subdivided into 11 communes (khum) and 93 villages (phum). According to the 1998 Census, the population of the district was 91,212 persons in 17,661 households in 1998. With a population of over 90,000 people, Kang Meas has an average population size for districts in Kampong Cham province. The average household size in Kang Meas is 5.2 persons per household, the same as the rural average for Cambodia. The sex ratio in the district is 91.2%, with significantly more females than males.
