= Prey Chhor district =

Prey Chhor ស្រុកព្រៃឈរ
- District (srok)
- Location in Cambodia
- Coordinates: 12°3′1″N 105°15′25″E
- Country: Cambodia
- Province: Kampong Cham
- Communes: 15
- Villages: 176

Government
  - Governor: Mr. Meas Tuok

Population (2008)
  - Total: 125,352
- Time zone: +7
- Geocode: 0313

Prey Chhor (Khmer: ស្រុកព្រៃឈរ, lit. 'The Straight Jungle') is a district (srok) located in Kampong Cham province, Cambodia. The district capital is Prey Totueng town located around 29 kilometres west of the provincial capital of Kampong Cham and 95 kilometres northeast of Phnom Penh by road. Prey Chhor is a central district of Kampong Cham and is surrounded by other Kampong Cham districts.

The district is easily accessed by road from Kampong Cham city, Phnom Penh and Kampong Thom. The district capital is a busy market town that lies at an important crossroads. It lies on National Highway 7 between Phnom Penh and Kampong Cham. National road 70 to Kang Meas begins at the district capital and National road 62 begins in Prey Chhor and links National Highway 7 with National Highway 6 to Kampong Thom and the north.

== Tuk Chhar Resort ==
Prey Chhor district is home to Tuk Chhar resort, a recreation area of natural and historic attractions popular with local and international visitors. The area includes a natural spring of 3 cubic metres. The water from the spring is used to generate hydroelectric power and the run-off area is a popular swimming site. Also nearby are several ancient temples called Preah Theat Teuk Chhar. These temples were constructed in AD 1005, during the reign of King Suryavarman I.

== Location ==
Prey Chhor district is a central district of Kampong Cham Province. Reading from the north clockwise, Prey Chhor shares a border with Baray district of Kampong Thom province and Chamkar Leu district of Kampong Cham to the north. Chamkar Leu continues down to the eastern border of the district where the border with Kampong Siem district begins. To the south is Kang Meas district and the western border of the district is shared with Cheung Prey district.

== Administration ==
The Prey Chhor district governor is Mr. Meas Tuok. He reports to Hun Neng, the Governor of Kampong Cham. The following table shows the villages of Prey Chhor district by commune.

Khum (communes)	Phum (villages)
Baray	Prey Khchay, Tuol Chambak, Trapeang Beng, Leang Khsach, Trapeang Bei, Ou Kambaor, Kouk Sralau, Roung Kou, Voat Chas, Roul Chruk, Prey Rumdeng, Samnak Cheung, Samnak Tboung
Boeng Nay	Komar Reach, Trapeang Anhchanh, Thma Da, Thma Koul, Trapeang Bet, Boeng Nay, Trapeang Thum, Pravas, Neak Ta Snoeng, Ta Ok, Kbal Damrei, Tuol Khvav, Chhuk Sa, Chheu Bak, Traeung, Chonloat Dai, Voat Chas
Chrey Vien	Dai Buon, Doun Dei, Trapeang Tuk, Slaeng, Banteay Rueng, Tuol Ta Kaor, Kralaong, Ou Kambot, Khvet Touch, Chrey Vien, Trapeang Ampil, Ta Ream, Klaeng Poar, Tuek Nuem, Tuol Bak Koam, Trapeang Sangkae, Prey Totueng, Trapeang Pnov
Khvet Thum	Khvet Thum, Baray, Angkrang, Ta Ngal, Ampil Thum, Dangkao, Pratheat, Kabbas
Kor	Doun Lai, Mrenh, Ta Meas, Ta Kaev, Ta Ley, Ta Mout, Rumduol, Svay Pen, Kraoy Voat, Trapeang Poun
Krouch	Ou Chrok, Prey Sak, Tuol Khpos, Krasang Ta Mong, Krouch, Thmei, Samraong
Lvea	Kok, Trapeang Chi Neang, Kouk Trea Kaeut, Kouk Trea Lech, Sdok Antong, Ta Chak, Me Meang, Tang Kouk, Lvea, Tang Trapeang
Mien	Tuol Prich, Ou Sangkae, Keh, Trapeang Chhuk, Nam Ken, Mien, Tuol Poun, Phkay Proek, Kampong Samret, Krasang Pul, Damnak Pongro, Kampong Samnanh, Ou Ta Nov, Dei Kraham, Khlouy Ti Muoy, Khlouy Ti Pir, Khlouy Ti Bei, Khlouy Ti Buon, Traeung.
Prey Chhor	Prey Chhor, Sek Yum, Chres, Sangkae
Sour Saen	Sour Saen, Andoung, Trapeang Reang, Trapeang Tnaot, Traeuy Ou, Trapeang Tbal, Chambak Thma, Svay Reaks
Samraong	Banteay Thmei, Ta Kret, Kandaol Kaong, Trapeang Ruessei, Svay Prey, Samraong, Soudei, Thmei, Veal, Smer, Prey Khchay
Srangae	Srangae Cheung, Srangae Tboung, Senson Tboung, Senson Cheung, Ta Sar, Ta Koch, Trapeang thum, Trapeang Rung
Thma Pun	Trang, Andoung Pech, Trapeang Boeng, Tuol Thma, Lech Voat, Andoung Phdau, Thma Pun Kandal, Andoung Ta Loeng, Ou Ta thok
Tong Rong	Tong Rong, Phteah Khpos, Thnong, Prasat, Samraong, Preah Srok, Kok Kandal, Tro Mukh Ti Muoy, Tro Mukh Ti pir, Doung
Trapeang Preah	Kaoh Svay, Pring Bei Daeum, Chachak, Prey sralau, Pun Pramat, Kur, Sbaeng, Prey Sralanh, Trapeang Leak, Ou Da, Trapeang Reang, Tuol Ampil, Ta Lon, Kaoh Kaphem, Trapeang svay, Ang, Doung, Tonle Sar, Kakaoh, Ou Doun Nhea, Khvav, Dei Lou, Roluos, Trapeang Krasang

== Demographics ==
The district is subdivided into 15 communes (khum) and 176 villages (phum). According to the 1998 Census, the population of the district was 127,683 persons in 24,892 households in 1998. With a population of over 120,000 people, Prey Chhor district has the second largest district population in Kampong Cham province after Tbong Kmom district. The average household size in Prey Chhor is 5.1 persons per household, which is slightly lower than the rural average for Cambodia (5.2 persons). The sex ratio in the district is 93.5%, with significantly more females than males.
