= Sandan =

Sandan may refer to:

- Dan (rank)
- Desmodium oojeinense, a flowering tree native to India and Nepal
- Hittite god Šanta
- Sandan District, Cambodia
- Sandan-kyō, ravine in Japan
