= Sampov Lun (commune) =

Commune in Sampov Lun District, Battambang Province, Cambodia

Coordinates: 13°23′N 102°21′E

Sampov Lun ឃុំសំពៅលូន
- Commune
- Interactive map of Sampov Lun
- Country: Cambodia
- Province: Battambang Province
- District: Sampov Loun District
- Villages: 4
- Time zone: UTC+7 (ICT)

Sampov Lun (Khmer: ឃុំសំពៅលូន) is a khum (commune) of Sampov Loun District in Battambang Province in northwest Cambodia.

== Villages ==
- Thnal Bat
- Thnal Bambaek
- Kaoh Touch
- Tuol Chrey
