= Batheay =

Batheay may refer to:

- Batheay District, a district of Kampong Cham Province, Cambodia
- Batheay Commune, a commune of Batheay District, Cambodia; see Communes of Cambodia
