= Batheay district =

Batheay ស្រុកបាធាយ
- District (srok)
- Location within Cambodia
- Coordinates: 11°59′46″N 104°56′40″E
- Country: Cambodia
- Province: Kampong Cham
- Communes: 12
- Villages: 80

Government
  - Governor: Mr. Yin Kim Horn

Population (1998)
  - Total: 90,920
- Time zone: +7
- Geocode: 0301

Batheay (Khmer: ស្រុកបាធាយ, lit. 'The Defeat of Tou Phi's Mythical Buffalo') is a district (srok) of Kampong Cham province, Cambodia. The district capital is Ph'av town. The town is located on National Highway 6 around 64 kilometres east of the provincial capital at Kampong Cham city and 60 kilometres north of the Cambodian capital Phnom Penh. The district lies at the junction between two major waterways, the Mekong River and the Tonle Sap.

In August 2006, Batheay district was the site of an outbreak of the deadly H5N1 virus commonly known as "avian influenza" or "bird flu". The outbreak was detected in live and dead ducks taken from a farm in the district and the Ministry of Agriculture culled 700 birds to prevent further outbreaks. Authorities suspect that ducks smuggled from Prey Veng Province where an earlier outbreak was confirmed, to nearby Tbong Khmum district, were responsible for this the new outbreak. Overall, more than 3000 ducks were slaughtered in Kampong Cham to prevent further infections. No human infections were reported.

== Location ==
Batheay district is the easternmost district of Kampong Cham Province and borders on two other provinces. Reading from the north clockwise, Batheay shares a border with Kampong Thom province to the north and the districts of Cheung Prey and Kang Meas to the east. To the south of Batheay are Ksach Kandal, Mukh Kampuol and Ponhea Leu districts of Kandal province. Batheay shares its western border with Kampong Tralach and Chol Kiri districts of Kampong Chhnang province.

== Administration ==
Mr. Yin Kim Horn is the Batheay district governor and reports to Hun Neng the Governor of Kampong Cham. The following table shows the villages of Batheay district by commune.

ឃុំ Khum (communes)	ភូមិ Phum (villages)
បាធាយ	Svay Pok(ស្វាយពក), Batheay(បាធាយ), Srah Pring(ស្រះព្រីង), Chreaek(ជ្រែក), Tuol(ទួល), Ou Mal(អូរម៉ាល់)
Chbar Ampov	Chbar Ampov(ច្បារអំពៅ), Tuol Chan(ទួលចាន់), Anlong Chrey(អន្លង់ជ្រៃ), Stueng Chveng(ស្ទឹងឆ្វេង)
Chealea	Chea Lea(ជាលា), Ta Ngil(តាង៉ិល), Tang Krang(តាំងក្រាំង), Baek Peang(បែកពាង), Phnum Thom(ភ្នំធំ)
Cheung Prey	Cheung Prey(ជើងព្រៃ), Andoung Snay(អណ្ដូងស្នាយ), Prasoutr Kor(ប្រសូត្រ "ក"), Prasoutr Kha(ប្រសូត្រ "ខ"), Trabaek(ត្របែក), Trayang Pong(ត្រយ៉ងពង)
Me Pring	Me Pring(មេព្រីង), Tang Thlaeung(តាំងថ្លើង), Tang Srei(តាំងស្រី), Tang Roleang(តាំងរលាង), Prey Kaor(ព្រៃកោ)
Ph'av	Ph'av(ផ្អាវ), Samraong(សំរោង), Tang Boeng(តាំងបឹង), Ba Kal(បាកាល), Prey Nha(ព្រៃញា), Kandaol(កណ្ដោល)
Sambour	Sambour(សំបូរ), Balang(បាលាំង), Veal(វាល), Sangkaeub(សង្កើប), Ta Poy(តាពយ), Chong(ចុង), Tao Baek(តាបែក)
Sandaek	Kampal(តាបែក), Pou Steang(ពោធិស្ទៀង), Svay Prey(ស្វាយព្រៃ), Tang Chrey(តាំងជ្រៃ), Sroengk(ស្រឹង្គ)
Tang Krang	Phnum Diel(ភ្នំដិល), Cheung Chhnok(ជើងឆ្នុក), Tboung Phnum(ត្បូងភ្នំ), Popit(ពពិត), Ak Tieng(អកទៀង), Kampong Preah(កំពង់ព្រះ), Tang Kouk(តាំងគោក), Prasat(ប្រាសាទ)
Tang Krasang	Boeng Veaeng(បឹងវែង), Kradas Kor(ក្រដាស ក), Kradas Kha(ក្រដាស ខ), Sdok Thum(ស្ដុកធំ), Trav Phni(ត្រាវភ្នី), Khvet(ខ្វិត), Boeng(បឹង), Khtum(ខ្ទុំ), Chan(ចាន់), Chi Neang(ជីនាង)
Trab	Roung Damrei(រោងដំរី), Kampout(កំពោក), Phnum Touch(ភ្នំតូច), Tum Prong(ទំព្រង), Thmei(ថ្មី), Pou Ruessei(ពោធិឫស្សី), Trab(ត្រប់), Chan Kong(ចាន់គង់), Thkov(ថ្កូវ), Thma Kaev(ថ្មកែវ), Routh(រោធ)
Tumnob	Tumnob Leu(ទំនប់លើ), Prayuk(ប្រយុក), Doun Paen(ដូនប៉ែន), Roong(រូង), Prasam(ប្រសាំ), Sroeng(ស្រឹង្គ), Trapeang Snao(ត្រពាំងស្នោ)

== Demographics ==
The district is subdivided into 12 communes (khum) and 80 villages (phum). According to the 1998 Census, the population of the district was 90,920 persons in 17,541 households in 1998. With a population of over 90,000 people, Batheay is one of the less populous districts in Kampong Cham province. The average household size in Batheay is 5.1 persons per household, the same as the rural average for Cambodia. The sex ratio in the district is 91.3%, with more females than males.
