= Srey Santhor district =

District in Kampung Cham, Cambodia

Srey Santhor district ស្រុកស្រីសន្ធរ
- District
- Location in Cambodia
- Coordinates: 11°50′31″N 105°7′33″E
- Country: Cambodia
- Province: Kampong Cham
- Communes: 14
- Villages: 86

Government
  - Governor: Oun Chanda

Population (1998)
  - Total: 91,765
- Time zone: UTC+7 (ICT)
- Geocode: 0314

Srey Santhor (Khmer: ស្រុកស្រីសន្ធរ, lit. 'The Great happiness') is a district (srok) located in Kampong Cham province, Cambodia. The district capital is Srey Santhor town located on the south bank of the Mekong River around midway between Phnom Penh and the provincial capital of Kampong Cham. Srey Santhor is in south western Kampong Cham and lies on the border with Kandal and Prey Veng provinces. It was briefly the capital of Cambodia during the post-Angkor era from 1431 to 1434. During the Middle Period, it was then known as Srey Sarchhor (Khmer: ស្រីសឈរ).

== 2000 Floods ==
Between July and November 2000, Cambodia was subject to catastrophic flooding in all provinces bordering the Mekong River. The Mekong literally burst it banks and Cambodia experienced the worst flooding in 70 years. As most of Srey Santhor district is low lying and parallels the Mekong, Srey Santhor is subject to annual flooding when the Mekong rises. However, in 2000 90% of the district's land area was flooded and 95% of the annual rice crop was completely destroyed.

== Location ==
Srey Santhor district is a central district of Kampong Cham Province. Reading from the north clockwise, Srey Santhor shares a border with Kang Meas district of Kampong Cham to the north across the Mekong. Koh Sotin district lies on the eastern border. To the south are Sithor Kandal and Pea Reang districts of Prey Veng province. The western border of the district is shared with Khsach Kandal district of Kandal province.

== Administration ==
The Srey Santhor district governor is Heng Vanny. He reports to Hun Neng, the Governor of Kampong Cham. The following table shows the villages of Srey Santhor district by commune.

Khum (commune)	Phum (villages)
Baray	Sya Boeng Veaeng, Sya Ampil, Banteay, Kamphlak
Chi Bal	Khnor Doung, Slaeng, Chi Bal, Tang Krang, Khyaong
Khnar Sa	Angk, Kngaok, Treas, Khnar Sa, Ampil
Kaoh Andaet	Kbal Kaoh, Kokir, Chong Kaoh, Krouch Saeuch
Mean Chey	Veal, Moan Dab Leu, Moan Dab Kraom, Kaoh Kou, Chey, Samraong, Pok Paen
Pteah Kandal	Ou Leav, Phteah Kandal Leu, Phteah Kandal Kraom, Chong Boeng Krau
Pram Yam	Pram Yam, Kdei Thkar, Cheung Doek, Chi Pray
Preaek Dambouk	Ta Kay, Ta Meun, Ta Mol, Chong Boeng Knong, Preaek Dambouk Kraom, Preaek Dambouk Leu, Svay Mu, Ampil, Phteah Veal
Preaek Pou	Roka Tvear, Preaek Pou Leu, Preaek Pou Kraom, Chras, Prathnal, Kouk Char, Santey, Thma Da, Turi Leu, Turi Kandal, Turi Kraom, Prey Tbeh
Preaek Rumdeng	Kser, Ou Lang, Tnaot Ka, Tnaot Kha, Preaek Rumdeng Ka, Preaek Rumdeng Kha, Preaek Rumdeng Kho, Preaek Ouv Chrueng Ka, Preaek Ouv Chrueng Kha, Svay Ta Noan Ka, Svay Ta Noan Kha, Kampong Pnov, Ta Koch, Ta Ngak Thmei
Ruessei Srok	Tnaot Kraom, Prey Totueng, Ruessei Srok, Tnaot Leu
Svay Pou	Pou, Svay, Chi Pao, Teahean, Trea, Khvet
Svay Sach Phnum	Svay Leu, Svay Kandal, Svay Tboung, Svay Kraom, Svay Sach Phnum
Tong Tralach	Tong Tralach, Boeng Ting, Khting, Chonloat Dai

== Demographics ==
The district is subdivided into 14 communes (khum) and 86 villages (phum). According to the 1998 Census, the population of the district was 91,765 persons in 18,224 households in 1998. With a population of over 90,000 people, Srey Santhor district has an average district population for Kampong Cham province. The average household size in Srey Santhor is 5.0 persons per household, which is slightly lower than the rural average for Cambodia (5.2 persons). The sex ratio in the district is 92.0%, with significantly more females than males.

== Tourism ==
Wat Vihear Suor is one of the popular touristic destinations in the district.
