= Cheung Prey district =

Cheung Prey ស្រុកជើងព្រៃ
- District (srok)
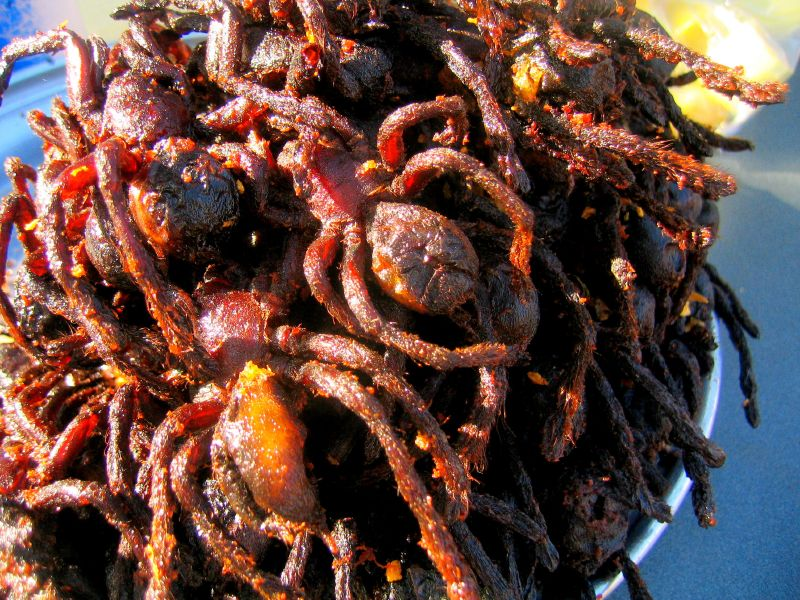
- Fried spiders for sale at the market in Skuon, Cheung Prey

- Location in Cambodia
- Coordinates: 12°3′4″N 105°4′15″E
- Country: Cambodia
- Province: Kampong Cham
- Communes: 10
- Villages: 74

Population (1998)
  - Total: 74,859
- Time zone: +7
- Geocode: 0303

Cheung Prey (Khmer: ស្រុកជើងព្រៃ, lit. 'The Jungle Foots') is a district (srok) of Kampong Cham province, Cambodia. The district capital is Skuon town. This busy market town has grown up around the intersection of National Highway 6 and National Highway 7. Skun is around 49 kilometres east of the provincial capital at Kampong Cham city and 75 kilometres north of the Cambodian capital Phnom Penh.

The district capital of Skuon is also known as "Spiderville." The town has become famous with both locals and international visitors to Cambodia for its fried spiders. The spiders are either captured in their burrows or bred for sale. First the venom is removed and then the spider is killed by squeezing the thorax. The spiders are then fried whole with garlic and salt. The practice of eating spiders in Cheung Prey began under the Democratic Kampuchea regime in Cambodia. Eating spiders and other insects helped locals starving from the harsh policies of the Khmer Rouge. Now that local residents have acquired the taste, the fame of the crunchy spiders has spread and people travel from Phnom Penh just to sample the deep fried arachnae. International visitors also travel to Skun to see the spiders, but most are content to take photographs rather than sample this unusual delicacy.

== Location ==
Cheung Prey district is in eastern Kampong Cham Province. Reading from the north clockwise, Cheung Prey shares a border with Baray district of Kampong Thom province to the north and the district of Prey Chhor to the east. To the south of Batheay is Kang Meas district and Batheay district forms the western border.

== Administration ==
The Cheung Prey district governor reports to Hun Neng, the Governor of Kampong Cham. The following table shows the villages of Cheung Prey district by commune.

ឃុំ (communes)	ភូមិ (villages)
Khnaor Dambang	Roveang(រវៀង), Knaor Dambang(ខ្នុរដំបង), Veal(វាល)
Kouk Rovieng	Kouk Rovieng(គោករវៀង), Totoul(ទទោល), Ba Krong(បាគ្រង), Chhuk(ឈូក)
Phdau Chum	Phdau Chum Lech(ផ្ដៅជុំលិច), Phdau Chum Kaeut(ផ្ដៅជុំកើត), Chheu Teal(ឈើទាល), Cham Neang(ចាំនាង)
Prey Char	Pnov Lech(ពៅ្នលិច), Pnov Kaeut(ពៅ្នកើត), Prey Char Krau(ព្រៃចារក្រៅ), Siem Baoy(សៀមបោយ), Bati(បាទី), Prey Char Knong(ព្រៃចារក្នុង)
Pring Chrum	Pring Chum(ព្រីងជ្រុំ), Trapeang Tuem(ត្រពាំងទឹម), Trapeang Ph'av(ត្រពាំងផ្អាវ), Ta Ni(តានី), Kaoh Champa(កោះចំប៉ា)
Sampong Chey	Chambak(ចំបក់), Trapeang Sla(ត្រពាំងស្លា), Trapeang Trom(ត្រពាំងត្រុំ), Ampil Tvear(អំពិលទ្វារ), Kakaoh(កកោះ), Bos Ta Mom(បុស្សតាមុំ), Trapeang Chhuk(ត្រពាំងឈូក), Pou(ពោធិ), Bakham(បាខម), Sampong Chey(សំពងជ័យ), Svay Meas(ស្វាយមាស), Komar(កុមារ), Doun Tao(ដូន្ដោ), Sandaek(សណ្ដែក)
Sdaeung Chey	Pongro(ពង្រ), Sdaeung Chey(ស្ដើងជ័យ), Pra Boeng(ប្របឹង), Khnar(ខ្នារ), Sangkae(សង្កែ), Kdoy(ក្ដុយ), Damnak Ampil(ដំណាក់អំពិល)
Soutip	Pana(ប៉ាណា), Skon(ស្គន់), Thmei(ថ្មី), Ta Saen(តាសែន), Ngang(ង៉ូង), Doun Dom(ដូនដុំ), Boeng Chrouy(បឹងជ្រោយ), Sou Tip(សូទិព្វ)
Sramar	Sram Lech(ស្រាមលិច), Sram Kaeut(ស្រាមកើត), Sram Cheung(ស្រាមជើង), Thmei(ភូមិថ្មី), Sramar(ស្រម៉រ), Sangkae Pong(សង្កែពង), Pra Khnor(ប្រខ្នោរ), Kralanh(ក្រឡាញ់), Pra Theat(ប្រធាតុ), Trapeang Tmat(ត្រពាំងត្មាត), Srah Angk Kam(ស្រាមអង្កាម), Andoung Treang(អណ្ដូងត្រាំង), Trapeang Snao(ត្រពាំងស្នោ)
Trapeang Kor	Trapeang Thma(ត្រពាំងថ្ម), S'ang(ស្អាង), Ang(អង្គ), Pra Ten(ប្រទេន), Tumpoar(ទម្ពរ), Tnaot Bak(ត្នោតបាក់), Kandal(កណ្ដាល), Areaks(អារក្ស), Trapeang Kor(ត្រពាំងគរ), Kngaok(ក្ងោក)

== Demographics ==
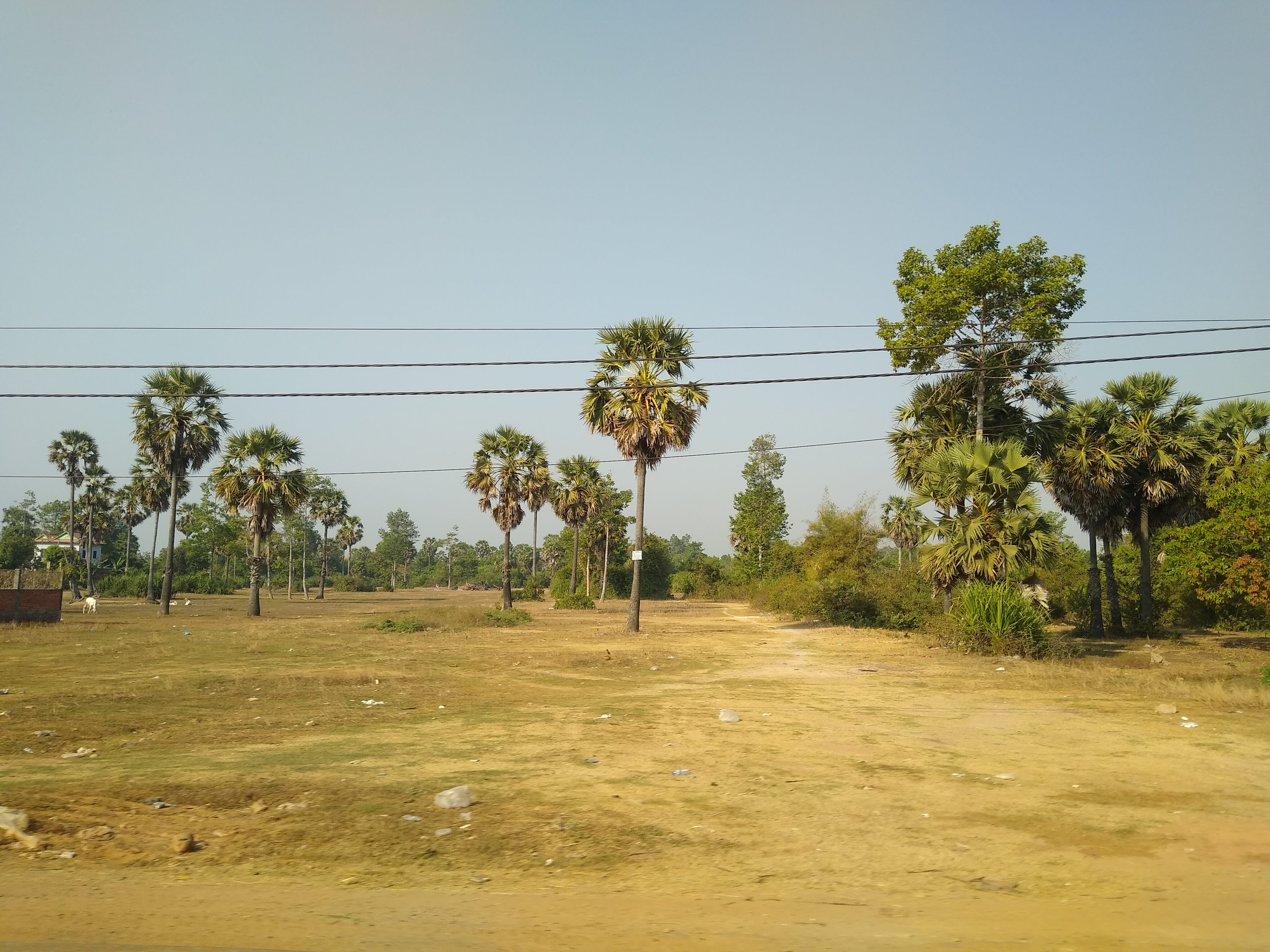
Countryside in Cheung Prey district

The district is subdivided into 10 communes (khum) and 74 villages (phum). According to the 1998 Census, the population of the district was 74,859 persons in 14,562 households in 1998. With a population of over 70,000 people, Cheung Prey is one of the smallest districts by population in Kampong Cham province, after Koh Soutin and Kampong Cham districts. The average household size in Cheung Prey is 5.1 persons per household, the same as the rural average for Cambodia. The sex ratio in the district is 95.5%, with more females than males.
