= Damber =

Damber is a given name. Notable people with the name include:

- Damber Dutta Bhatta (born 1970), Nepalese boxer
- Damber Singh Gurung (1900–1948), Indian politician
- Damber Singh Sambahamphe, Nepalese politician
- Damber Bahadur Shahi, Nepalese judge
- Damber Dhoj Tumbahamphe, Nepalese politician
