= Skuon =

Skun ស្គន់
- City
- Nickname: Spiderville
- Location within Cambodia
- Coordinates: 12°3′4″N 105°4′15″E
- Country: Cambodia
- Province: Kampong Cham
- District: Cheung Prey

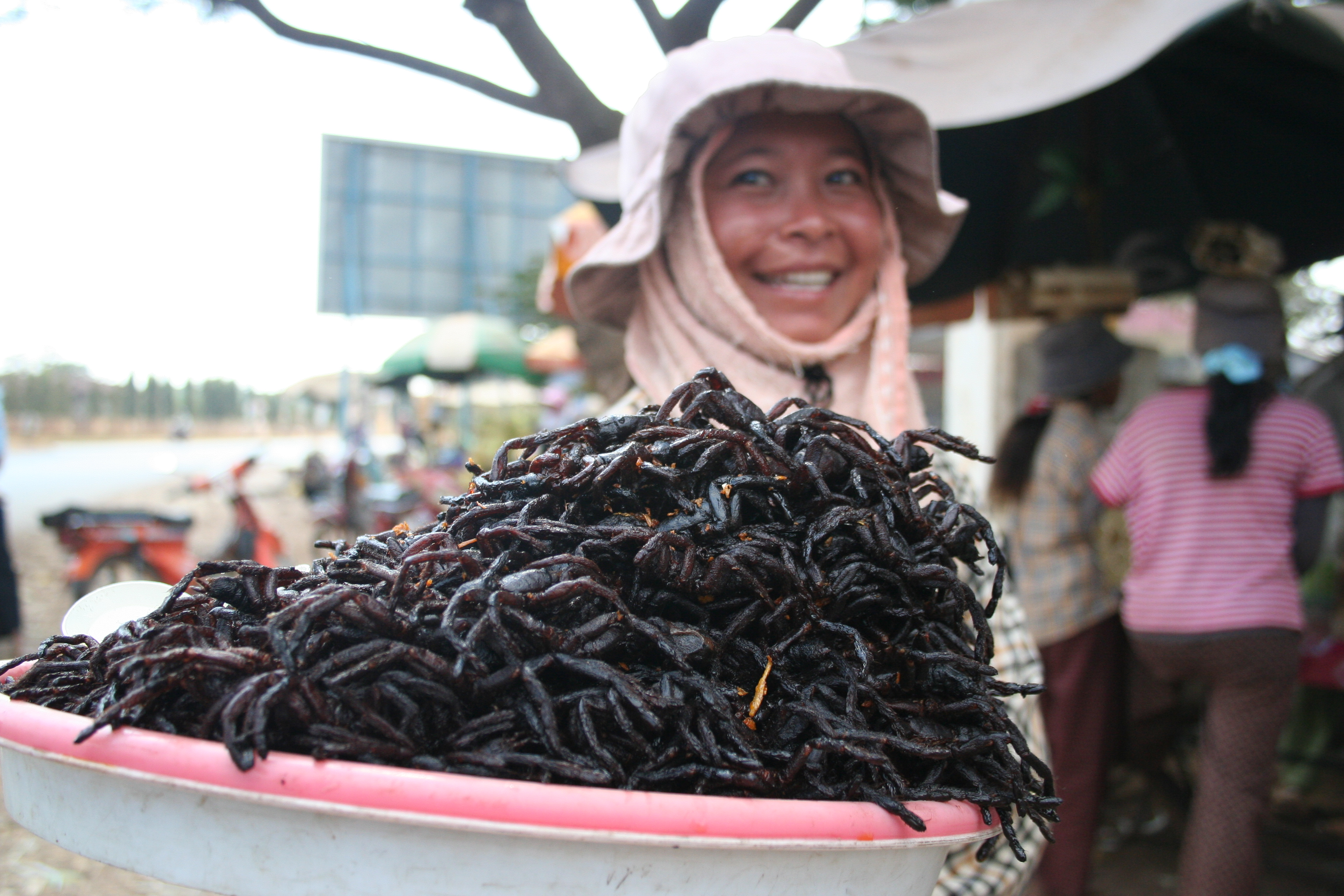
Fried spiders for sale at the market in Skun

Skun (Khmer: ស្គន់) is the district capital of Cheung Prey District, in Kampong Cham Province, Cambodia. This busy market town has grown up around the intersection of National Highway 6 and National Highway 7. Skun is around 49 kilometres (30 mi) west of the provincial capital at Kampong Cham city and 75 kilometres (47 mi) north of the Cambodian capital Phnom Penh. Skun is sometimes known in the local language as "Spiderville", it is famous with international visitors to Cambodia for its fried spiders.
