= Chrey Seima =

Commune in Sampov Lun District, Battambang Province, Cambodia

Coordinates: 13°28′N 102°22′E

Chrey Seima ឃុំជ្រៃសីមា
- Commune
- Interactive map of Chrey Seima
- Country: Cambodia
- Province: Battambang Province
- District: Sampov Loun District
- Villages: 5
- Time zone: UTC+7 (ICT)

Chrey Seima (Khmer: ឃុំជ្រៃសីមា) is a khum (commune) of Sampov Loun District in Battambang Province in northwestern Cambodia.

== Villages ==
- Ou Lvea
- Spean Youl
- Reaksmei
- Kilou Prambuon
- Chambak
