= Santepheap =

Coordinates: 13°25′59″N 102°22′19″E

Santepheap សន្តិភាព
- Commune
- Santepheap Commune ឃុំសន្តិភាព
- Interactive map of Santepheap
- Country: Cambodia
- Province: Battambang
- District: Sampov Loun
- Time zone: UTC+07:00 (ICT)

Santepheap (Khmer: សន្តិភាព [sɑntepʰiəp]; lit. 'Peace') is a commune (khum) of Sampov Loun District in Battambang Province in northwestern Cambodia.

== Villages ==
Name	Khmer
Kilou Dabbei	គីឡូដប់បី
Ou	អូរ
Trapeang Prolit	ត្រពាំងព្រលិត
