= Kampong Siem district =

Kampong Siem ស្រុកកំពង់សៀម
- City District
- Location in Cambodia
- Coordinates: 12°0′52″N 105°25′3″E
- Country: Cambodia
- Province: Kampong Cham

Population (1998)
  - Total: 99,056
- Time zone: UTC+7 (ICT)
- Geocode: 0306

Kampong Siem (Khmer: កំពង់សៀម, lit. 'The Siam's Port') is a district (srok) located in Kampong Cham province, Cambodia. The district surrounds the provincial capital Kampong Cham City. The administrative center of the district locates not far from the Provincial capital of Kampong Cham in Ampil Leu Village, Ampil Commune about 3 km west from the center of Kampong Cham city on National Highway 7 and is 120 kilometres by road from Phnom Penh. The district borders on the western bank of the Mekong for most of its length.

In February 2007 the United States Peace Corps sent 29 volunteers to live in Kampong Siem District. This marked the beginning of the first ever Peace Corps mission in Cambodia. During a nine-week stay in the district the group of volunteers from San Francisco studied the Khmer language, acclimatised themselves to the local way of life, tried eating deep fried tarantulas and began teaching English.

== Location ==
Kampong Siem district is in central Kampong Cham Province and is surrounded by other Kampong Cham districts. Reading from the north clockwise, Kampong Cham shares a border with Stueng Trang district while Krouch Chhmar and Tbong Khmom districts form the eastern boundary. To the south of Kampong Siem is Koh Soutin district. The three districts of Kang Meas, Prey Chor and Chamkar Leu make up the western border of the district. Kampong Siem also surrounds the tiny Kampong Cham City which is the provincial capital.

== Administration ==
The Kampong Siem district governor reports to Hun Neng, the Governor of Kampong Cham. The following table shows the villages of Kampong Siem district by commune.

Khum (Communes)	Villages
Ampil	Andong Chroh (អណ្ដូងច្រុះ), Ampil Leu (អំពិលលើ), Ampil Kraom (អំពិលក្រោម), Cheung Kouk (ជើងគោក), Roliek (រលៀក), Romeas (រមាស), Banteay Thma (បន្ទាយថ្ម), Sralau (ស្រឡៅ), Krala (ក្រឡា), Chonghuk (ជង្ហុក), Veal Sbov (វាលស្បូវ), Sya (ស្យា)
Hanchey	Hanchey (ហាន់ជ័យ), Kroch Saeuch (ក្រូចសើច), Lvea Te (ល្វាទេ), Moan Haeur (មាន់ហើរ)
Kien Chrey	Prek Yuon (ព្រែកយួន), Enteak Nel (ឥន្ទនេល), Spean Thmei (ស្ពានថ្មី), Boeng Baboh (បឹងបបុះ), Kien Chrey Krau (កៀនជ្រៃក្រៅ), Kien Chrey Knong (កៀនជ្រៃក្នុង)
Kokor	Kokor Muoy (គគរ១), Kokor Pir (គគរ២), Chamkar Samseb (ចំការសាមសិប), Kampong Krabei (កំពង់ក្របី)
Kaoh Mitt	Kaoh Pen Ka (កោះប៉ែនក), Kaoh Pen Kha (កោះប៉ែនខ), Kaoh Pen Ko (កោះប៉ែនគ), Kaoh Dach (កោះដាច់), Kaoh Prolung (កោះព្រលូង), Svay Chrum (ស្វាយជ្រុំ), Kaoh Chas (កោះចាស់), Kampong Trom Kraom (កំពង់ត្រុំក្រោម), Kampong Trom Leu (កំពង់ត្រុំលើ)
Kaoh Roka	Kaoh Roka Krau (កោះរកាក្រៅ), Kaoh Roka Knong (កោះរកាក្នុង), Dambang Dek (ដំបងដែក), Or Chhleung (អូរឈ្លើង), Ta Meang (តាមាង), Thmei (ថ្មី), កោះគល់ (Kaoh Kol)
Kaoh Samraong	Phum Ti Muoy (ភូមិទី១), Phum Ti Pir (ភូមិទី២), Phum Ti Bei (ភូមិទី៣), Phum Ti Buon (ភូមិទី៤), Phum Ti Pram (ភូមិទី៥), Phum Ti Prammuoy (ភូមិទី៦), Phum Ti Prampir (ភូមិទី៧), Phum Ti Prambei (ភូមិទី ៨)
Kaoh Tontoem	Kaoh Kok Ka(កោះកុក "ក"), Kaoh Kok Kha (កោះកុក "ខ"), Kaoh Prak Kraom(កោះប្រាក់ក្រោម), Kaoh Prak Knong(កោះប្រាក់ក្នុង), Kaoh Prak Leu (កោះប្រាក់លើ)
Krala	Sdach Non (ស្ដេចនន), Tuol Beng (ទួលបេង), Andong Pou (អណ្ដូងពោធិ៍), Tuol Popel(ទួលពពេល), Trapeang Chrey (ត្រពាំងជ្រៃ), Trapeang Tras (ត្រពាំងត្រស់), Trapeang Roessei (ត្រពាំងឫស្សី), Angkuonh Dei (អង្គួញដី), Ampil Chrum (អំពិលជ្រុំ), Thmei (ថ្មី), Trapeang Thma (ត្រពាំងថ្ម), Trapeang Char (ត្រពាំងចារ), Trakuon (ត្រកួន)
Or Svay	Prey Chakrei (ព្រៃចក្រី), Anlong Snok (អន្លង់ស្នូក), Ampil Kranhanh (អំពិលក្រញ៉ាញ់), Or Svay (អូរស្វាយ), Trapeang Kak (ត្រពាំងកក់), Or Thnong(អូរធ្នង់), Khel Chey (ខែលជ័យ)
Ro'ang	Thma Koul (ថ្មគោល), Veal Khsach (វាលខ្សាច់), Prasam (ប្រសំ), Pongro (ពង្រ), Romul (រមូល), Tuol Roka (ទួលរកា), Ro'ang Leu (រអាងលើ), Ro'ang Kraom (រអាងក្រោម)
Rumchek	Chheuteal Srot Leu (ឈើទាលស្រុតលើ), Chheuteal Srot Kraom (ឈើទាលស្រុតក្រោម), Rumlech (រំលេច), Thmei (ថ្មី)
Srak	Lpeak (ល្ពាក), Prey Kuy (ព្រៃគុយ), Srak (ស្រក), Tamau (តាម៉ៅ)
Trean	Chrak Sdau (ច្រកស្ដៅ), Veal Kriel (វាលក្រៀល), Trean (ទ្រាន), Trapeang Ta Sokh (ត្រពាំងតាសុខ), Prathang (ប្រថង), Paen (ប៉ែន), Tuol Chambak (ទួលចំបក់), Chranieng (ច្រនៀង), Trapeang Ampil (ត្រពាំងអំពិល), Ta Khong (តាខុង), Tuol Trach (ទួលត្រាច), Poun (ពោន)
Vihear Thum	Prey Phdau (ព្រៃផ្ដៅ), Andong Svay (អណ្ដូងស្វាយ), Kouk Kream (គោកគ្រាម), Kdei Boeng (ក្ដីបឹង), Pongro (ពង្រ), Prasat (ប្រាសាទ), Kouk Totea (គោកទទា), Vihear (វិហារ), Kong Moha (គងមហា)

== Demographics ==
The district is subdivided into 15 communes (khum) and 112 villages (phum). According to the 1998 Census, the population of the district was 99,056 persons in 18,884 households in 1998. With a population of over 99,000 people, Kampong Siem is one of the more populated districts in Kampong Cham province. The average household size in Kampong Siem is 5.2 persons per household, slightly higher than the rural average for Cambodia (5.1). The sex ratio in the district is 92.0%, with more females than males.
