= Serei Mean Chey =

Coordinates: 13°27′N 102°22′E

Serei Mean Chey ឃុំសិរីមានជ័យ
- Commune
- Interactive map of Serei Mean Chey
- Country: Cambodia
- Province: Battambang Province
- District: Sampov Loun District
- Villages: 4
- Time zone: UTC+7 (ICT)

Serei Mean Chey is a khum (commune) of Sampov Loun District in Battambang Province in northwestern Cambodia.

== Villages ==
- Sralau Chrum
- Chheu Teal
- Pou Chrey
- Ou Trav Chu
