= Chamkar Leu district =

Chamkar Leu ស្រុកចំការលើ
- District (srok)
- Location in Cambodia
- Coordinates: 12°18′51″N 105°16′39″E
- Country: Cambodia
- Province: Kampong Cham
- Communes: 8
- Villages: 85

Government
  - Governor: H.E. Kim Nuth Nittia

Population (1998)
  - Total: 125,862
- Time zone: +7
- Geocode: 0302

Chamkar Leu (Khmer: ស្រុកចំការលើ lit. 'The Upper Farm') is a district (srok) of Kampong Cham province, Cambodia. The district capital is Chamkar Leu town. The town is located at the junction of National Roads 71 and 222 around 48 kilometres (30 mi) north east of the provincial capital at Kampong Cham city. The district is significant producer of rubber, both for domestic consumption and for export. Two large rubber co-operatives, Chamkar Andong Plantation and Chamkar Leu Plantation are located in the district. At 6,000 hectares (15,000 acres), the state-owned Chamkar Andong plantation is one of the largest in the country.

== Location ==
Reading from the north clockwise, Chamkar Leu shares a border with Kampong Thom province to the north and the district of Stueng Trang to the east. To the south of Chamkar Leu are Kampong Siem (south east) and Prey Chhor (south west) districts. Chamkar Leu shares its western border with Baray district of Kampong Thom province.

== Administration ==
Klouth Chenda is the district governor and reports to Kouch Chamroeun the Governor of Kampong Cham. The following table shows the villages of Chamkar Leu district by commune.

Khum (communes)	Phum (villages)
Bos Khnaor	Saray(សារ៉ាយ), Doun Thi(ដូនធី), Thlok Kravan(ថ្លុកក្រវ៉ាន់), Veal Thnong(វាលធ្នង់), Bos Khnor(បុសខ្នុរ), Chranaom(ច្រណោម), Prasaeur(ប្រសើរ), Dab Meakkakra(១០មករា), Sameakki(សាមគ្គី), ចំការកប្បាស(Chamkar Kabbas), Samsebbram(៣៥)
Chamkar Andoung	Chamkar Andoung(ចំការអណ្ដូង), Souchey(សួរជៃ), Svay Chuor(ស្វាយជួរ), Ou Kravan(អូរក្រវ៉ាន់), Doun Bos(ដូនបុស្ស), Choam Chrey(ជាំជ្រៃ), ភូមិលេខ ២(Phum Lekh Pir), ភូមិ១១(Phum Dab Muoy), ភូមិ៣៣(Phum Sam Bei), ភូមិ២២(Phum Mphey Pir), តាប្រ៉ុក(Ta Prok), ភូមិលេខ ១(Phum Lekh Muoy), សហគ្រាស(Sahak Kreas), សហគ្រាន់(Sahak Kroan), ស្រោងចាន់(Sraong Chan), រោងចក្រ(Roung Chakr), ក្រុមហ៊ុន(Kromhun)
Cheyyou	Spueu Ka(ស្ពឺ "ក"), Cheyyou(ជយោ), Ou Pes(អូរប៉ិះ), Trapeang Ruessei(ត្រពាំងឫស្សី), Trapeang Lpov(ត្រពាំងល្ពៅ)
Lvea Leu	Kbal Hong Thmei(ក្បាលហុងថ្មី), Kbal Hong Chas(ក្បាលហុងចាស់), Kralaeng Kaeut(ក្រឡែងកើត), Kralaeng Lech(ក្រឡែងលិច), Lvea Cheung(ល្វាជើង), Lvea Tboung(ល្វាត្បូង), Phum Bei(ភូមិ បី)
Spueu	Banteay Chey(បន្ទាយជ័យ), Popreng(ពព្រេង), Ou Veay(អូរវាយ), Peaeng Meas Cheung(ពែងមាសជើង), Peaeng Meas Tboung(ពែងមាសត្បូង), Spueu Lech(ស្ពឺលិច), Spueu Kaeut(ស្ពឺកើត), Veal(វាល)
Svay Teab	Trapeang Beng(ត្រពាំងបេង), Pramat Dei(ប្រម៉ាត់ដី), Veal Ri Lech(វាលរីលិច), Svay Teab(ស្វាយទាប), Proeks(ព្រឹក្ស), Thnal Baek Lech(ថ្នល់បែកលិច), Tang Krang(តាំងក្រង់), Mouha(មហា), Bos Thlan(បុសថ្លាន់), Srae Preal(ស្រែព្រាល), Ou Dar(អូរដា), Thnal Baek Kaeut(ថ្នល់បែកកើត), Veal Ri Kaeut(វាលរីកើត), ភូមិ៧៧(Phum Chetseb Prampir)
Ta Ong	Ta Ong(តាអុង), Sampoar(សំពរ័), Tuol Prak(ទួលប្រាក់), Tuol Meas(ទួលមាស), Tuol Paen(ទួលប៉ែន), Chamraeun Phal(ចំរើនផល), Trapeang Chhuk(ត្រពាំងឈូក), Tuol Srov(ទួលស្រូវ), Phum Samseb(ភូមិ ៣០), Phum Sammuoy(ភូមិ ៣១), Phum Sampir(ភូមិ ៣២), Phum Sambei(ភូមិ ៣៣), Phum Sambuon(ភូមិ ៣៤)
Ta Prok	Srae Prang(ស្រែប្រាំង), Rumchek(ស្រែប្រាំង), Neang Laeung(នាងលើង), Svay Teab(ស្វាយទាប), Ou Ta Saeng(អូរតាសែង), Chhuk(ឈូក), Phlak(ផ្លាក)

== Demographics ==
The district is subdivided into 8 communes (khum) and 85 villages (phum). According to the 1998 Census, the population of the district was 125,862 persons in 24,338 households in 1998. With a population of well over 100,000 people, Chamkar Leu is the third most populous district in Kampong Cham province, after Tbong Khmum and Prey Chhor. The average household size in Chamkar Leu is 5.2 persons per household, slightly larger than the rural average for Cambodia (5.1 persons). The sex ratio in the district is 95.5%, with more females than males.

== Recent history ==
Located in eastern Cambodia, not far from the border with Vietnam, Chamkar Leu was the site of significant fighting during the Cambodian Civil War. During the Second Indochina War the district was heavily bombed by both B-52 and smaller aircraft. One of the senior leaders of the Khmer Rouge, Ke Pauk was born in nearby Baray district. According to his auto-biography, Pauk joined the nascent Cambodian Communist movement in Svay Teab, Chamkar Leu District, Kampong Cham.
