= Ta Sda =

Coordinates: 13°25′N 102°23′E

Ta Sda ឃុំតាសា្ត
- Commune
- Interactive map of Ta Sda
- Country: Cambodia
- Province: Battambang Province
- District: Sampov Loun District
- Villages: 5
- Time zone: UTC+7 (ICT)

Ta Sda is a khum (commune) of Sampov Loun District in Battambang Province in northwestern Cambodia.

== Villages ==
- Veal Vong
- Ta Sda
- Chamkar Lhong
- Koun Phnum kharng Cheung
- Koun Phnum Tboung
