= Sre Ambel =

- Town
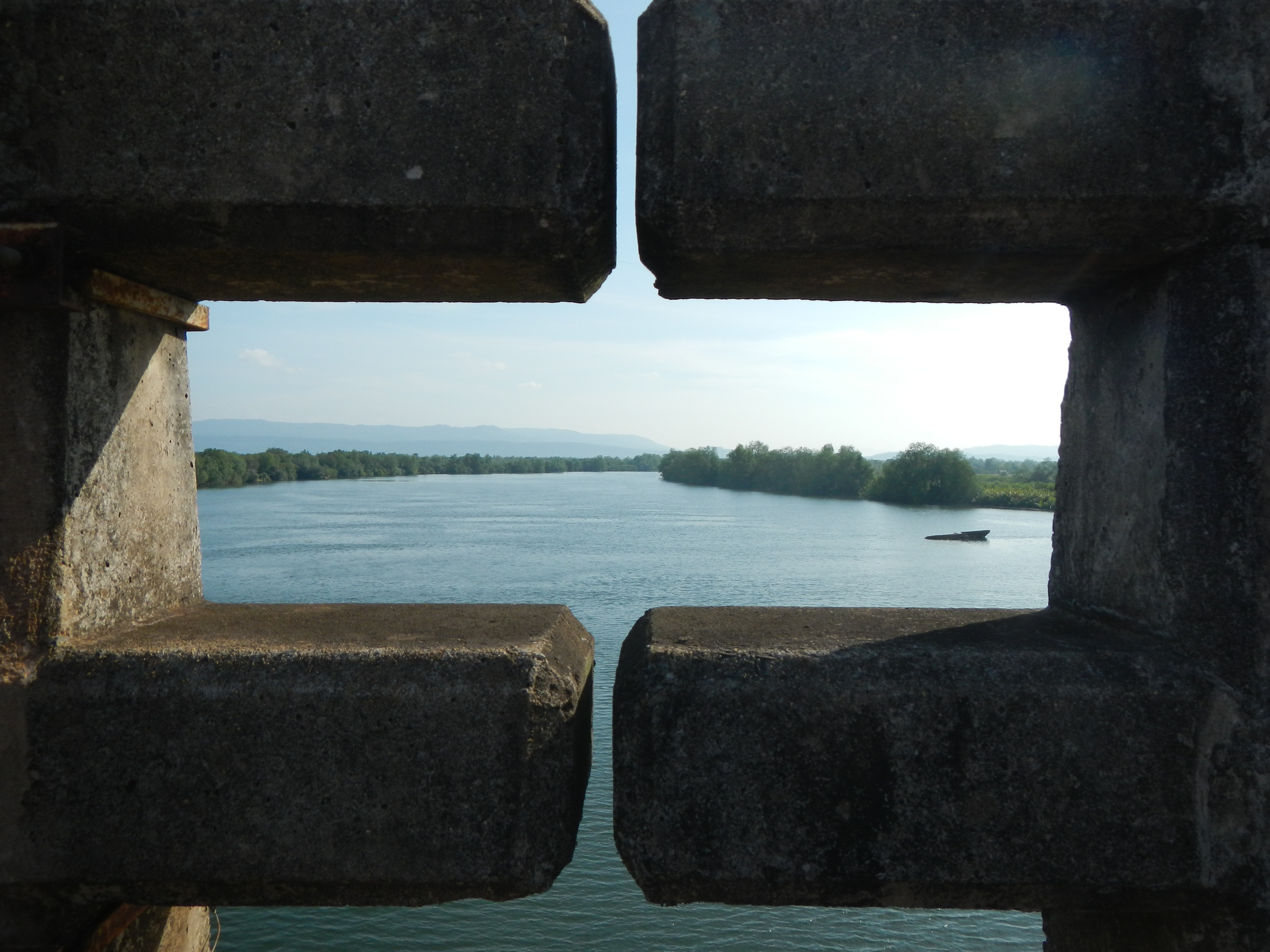

- Location within Cambodia
- Coordinates: 11°7′N 103°46′E
- Country: Cambodia
- Province: Koh Kong Province
- District: Srae Ambel District

Sre Ambel (ស្រែ អំបិល, lit. 'The Salt Farm') is a town in Koh Kong Province in south-western Cambodia. It is located along National Highway 4 and is 138 kilometres from provincial capital Koh Kong (city).
