= Thala Borivat District =

Thala Borivat ថាឡាបរីវ៉ាត់
- District (srok)
- Interactive map of Thala Borivat
- Country: Cambodia
- Province: Stung Treng
- Time zone: +7
- Geocode: 1905
- Website: http://thalaborivat.com

Thala Borivat District (Khmer: ស្រុកថាឡាបរីវ៉ាត់, pronounced [tʰaːlaː boriʋat]) is a district located in Stung Treng Province, in north-east Cambodia along the Mekong river. According to the Cambodian census of 2019, it had a population of 36,925.

Available hospitals in the district are: Chamkar Leu Health Center, Preah Rumkel Health Center, Preah Rumkel, and Thala Bariwat Health Center.

== Administration ==
The following table shows the villages of Thala Borivat District by commune.

ISO Code	Communes	Khmer
1905-01	Anlong Phe	ឃុំអន្លង់ភេ
1905-02	Chamkar Leu	ឃុំចំការលើ
1905-03	Kang Cham	ឃុំកាំងចាម
1905-04	Anlong Chrey	ឃុំអន្លង់ជ្រៃ
1905-05	Ou Rey	ឃុំអូររៃ
1905-06	Sam'ang	ឃុំសំអាង
1905-07	Srae Ruessei	ឃុំស្រែឫស្សី
1905-08	Thala Borivat	ឃុំថាឡាបរីវ៉ាត់
