= Kien Svay District =

Kien Svay ស្រុកកៀនស្វាយ
- District (srok)
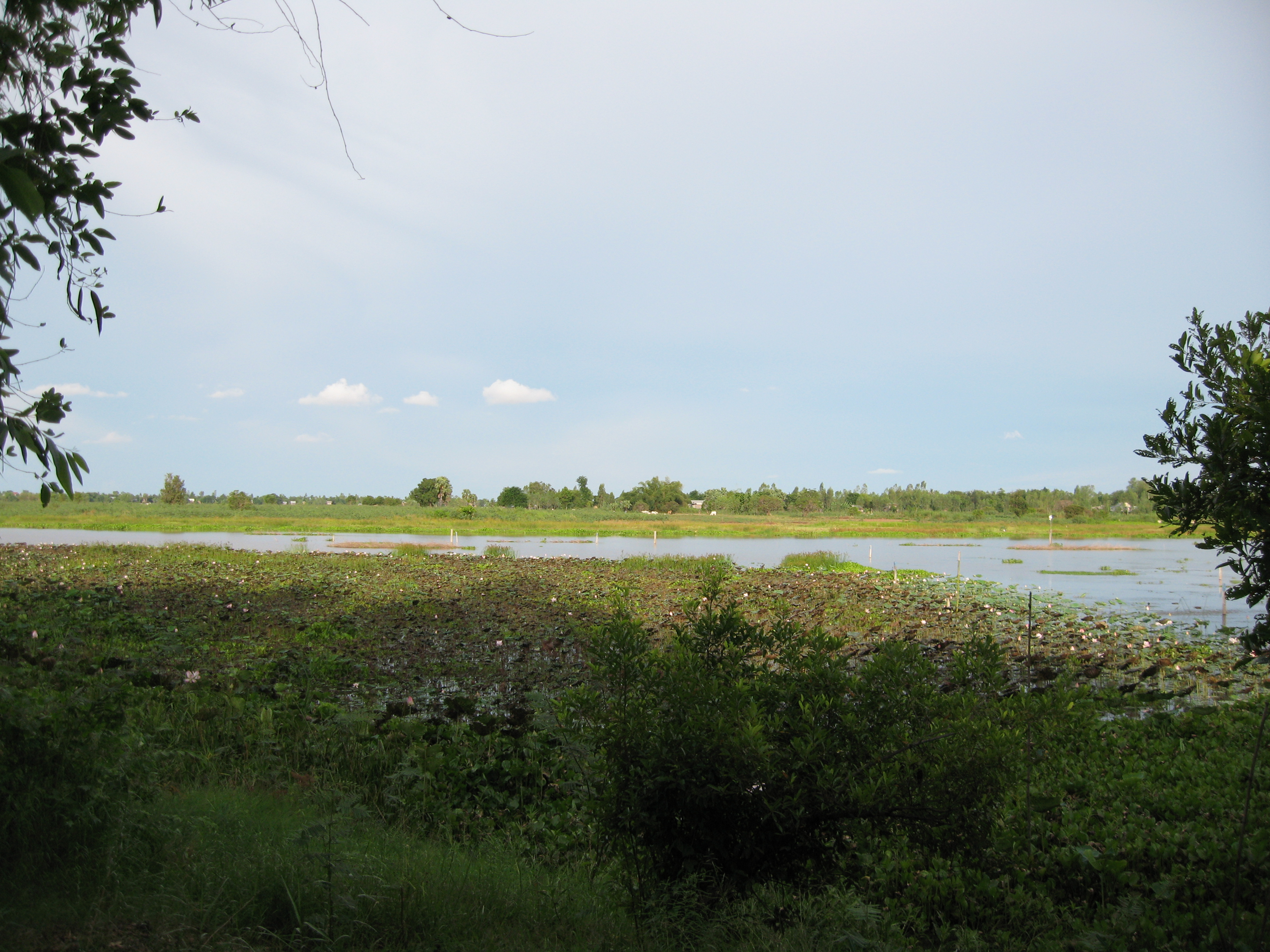
- A field in Kien Svay

- Location in Cambodia
- Coordinates: 11°30′32″N 105°4′31″E
- Country: Cambodia
- Province: Kandal
- Communes: 12
- Villages: 46

Population (1998)
  - Total: 148,358
- Time zone: +7
- Geocode: 0802

Kien Svay (Khmer: ស្រុកកៀនស្វាយ) is a district (srok) of Kandal Province, Cambodia. The district is subdivided into 12 communes (khum): Banteay Daek, Chheu Teal, Dei Edth, Kampong Svay, Kbal Kaoh, Kokir, Kokir Thum, Phum Thum, Preaek Aeng, Preaek Thmei, Samraong Thum, Veal Sbov, and 46 villages (phum).

There is a small resort of shacks on stilts above a river near the town. This is a popular weekend jaunt for Phnom Penh residents.

Kien Svay District lies on road number 1. It is connected between Phnom Penh Capital and Svay Rieng Province. Most people here are farmers.

== Education ==
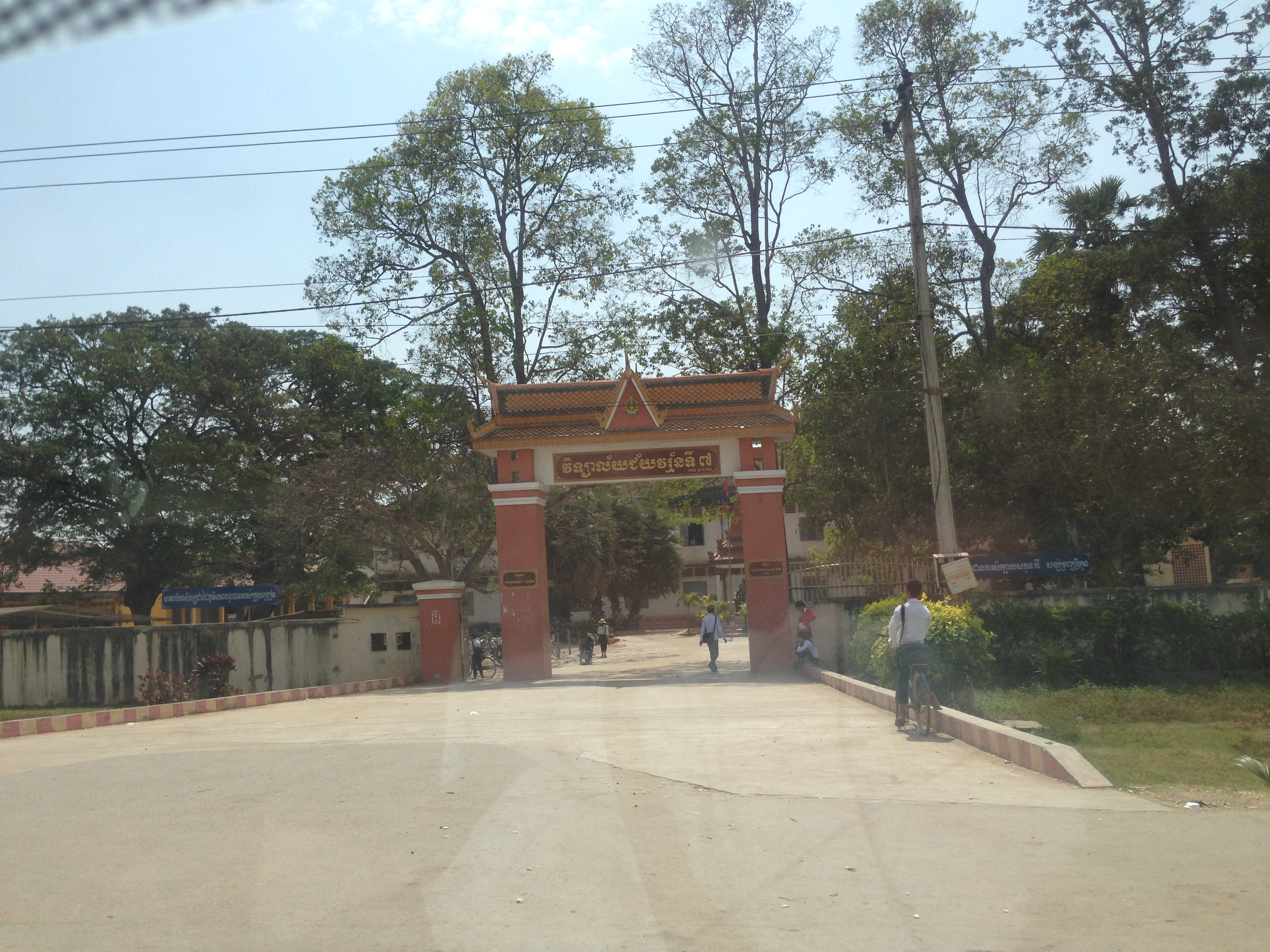
Jayavarman VII High School

- High schools
  - Jayavarman VII High School
  - Samrong Thom Sannivo High School
  - Hun Sen Serei Dei Dosh High School
- Secondary schools
  - Banteay Daek Secondary School
  - Kokir Secondary School
  - Kokir Thom Secondary School
  - Roteang Secondary School
  - Ruessei Srok Secondary School

== Gallery ==
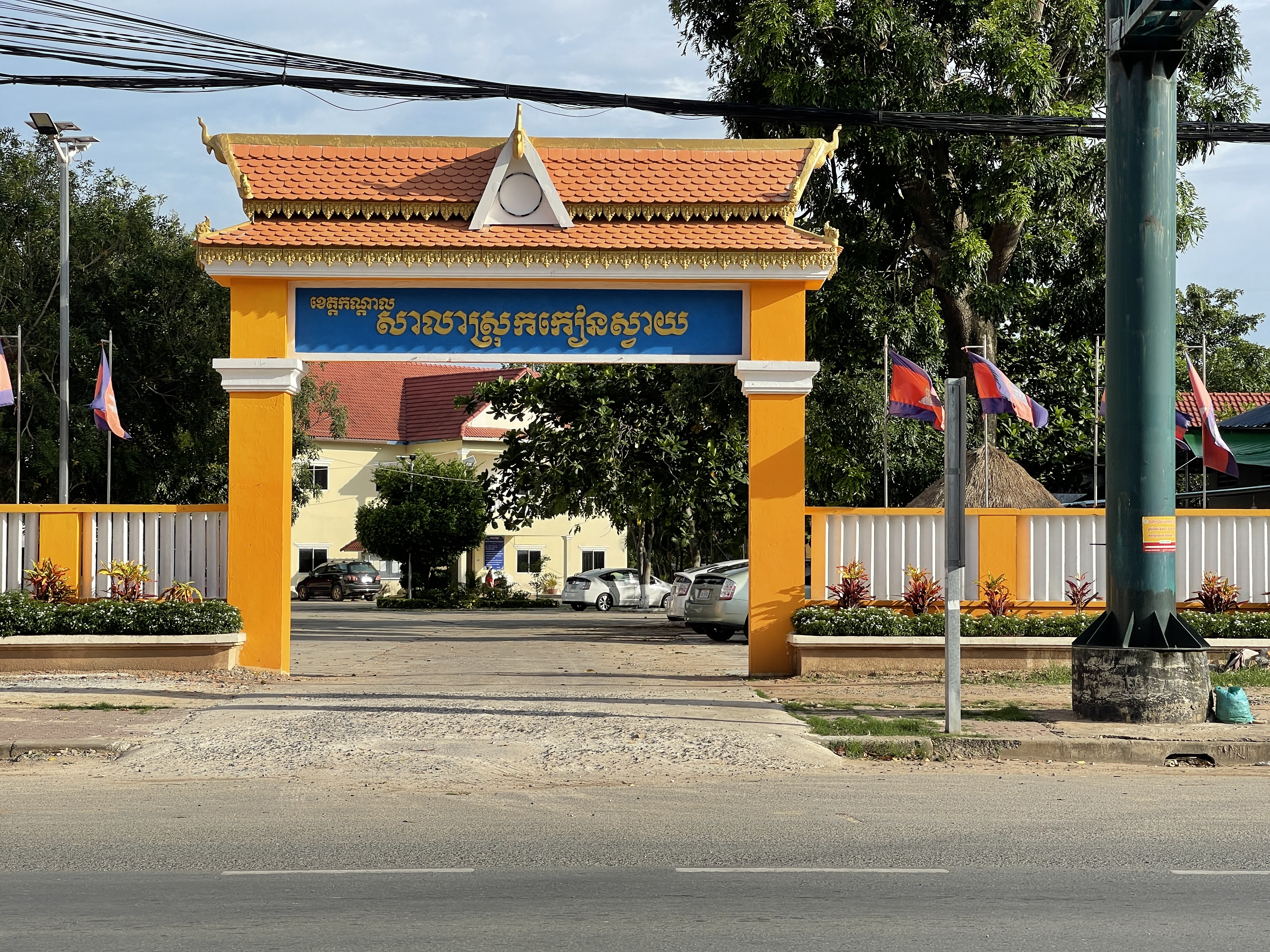
Kien Svay District Hall

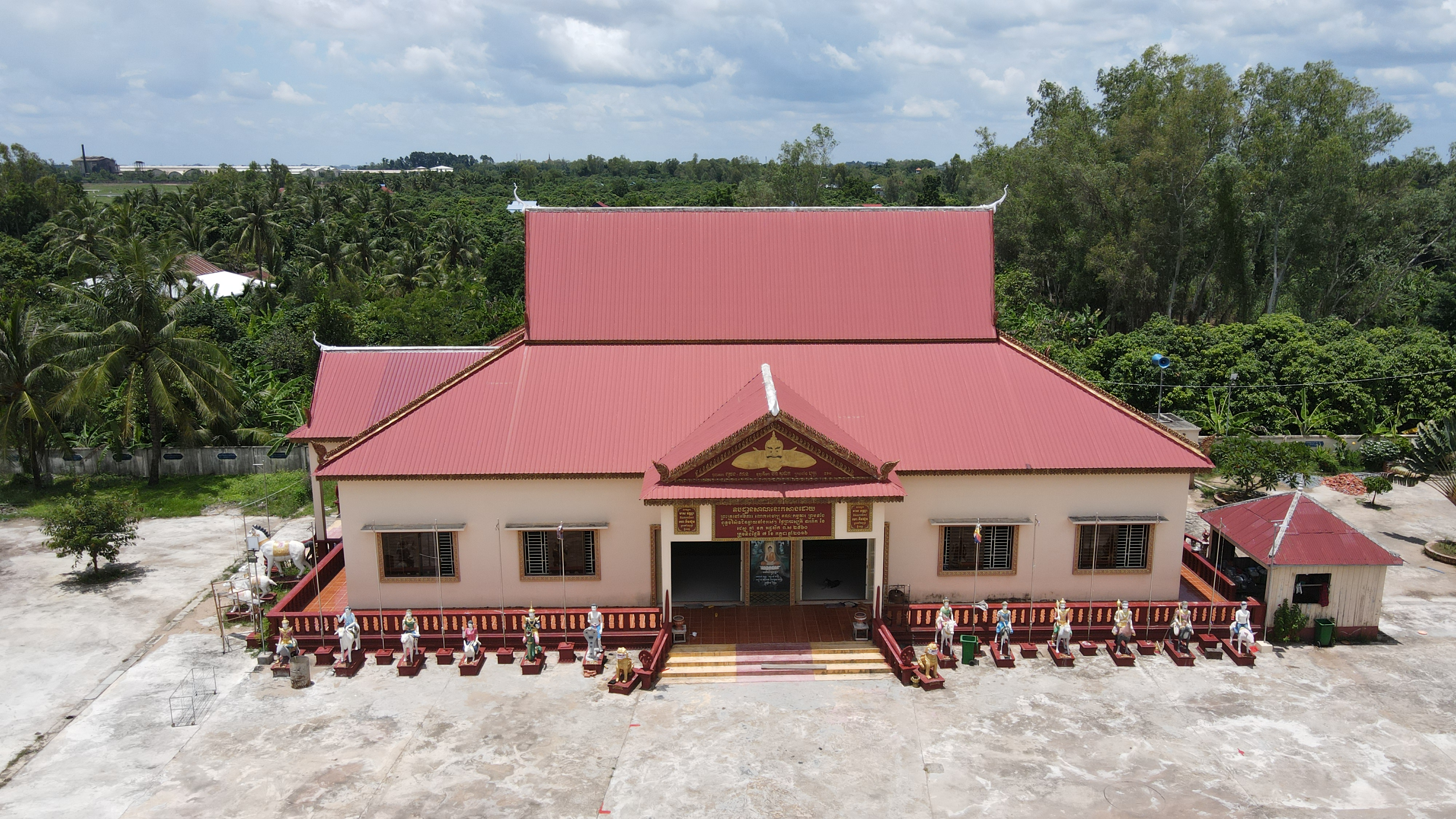
Wat Porthi Serey Dey Dos

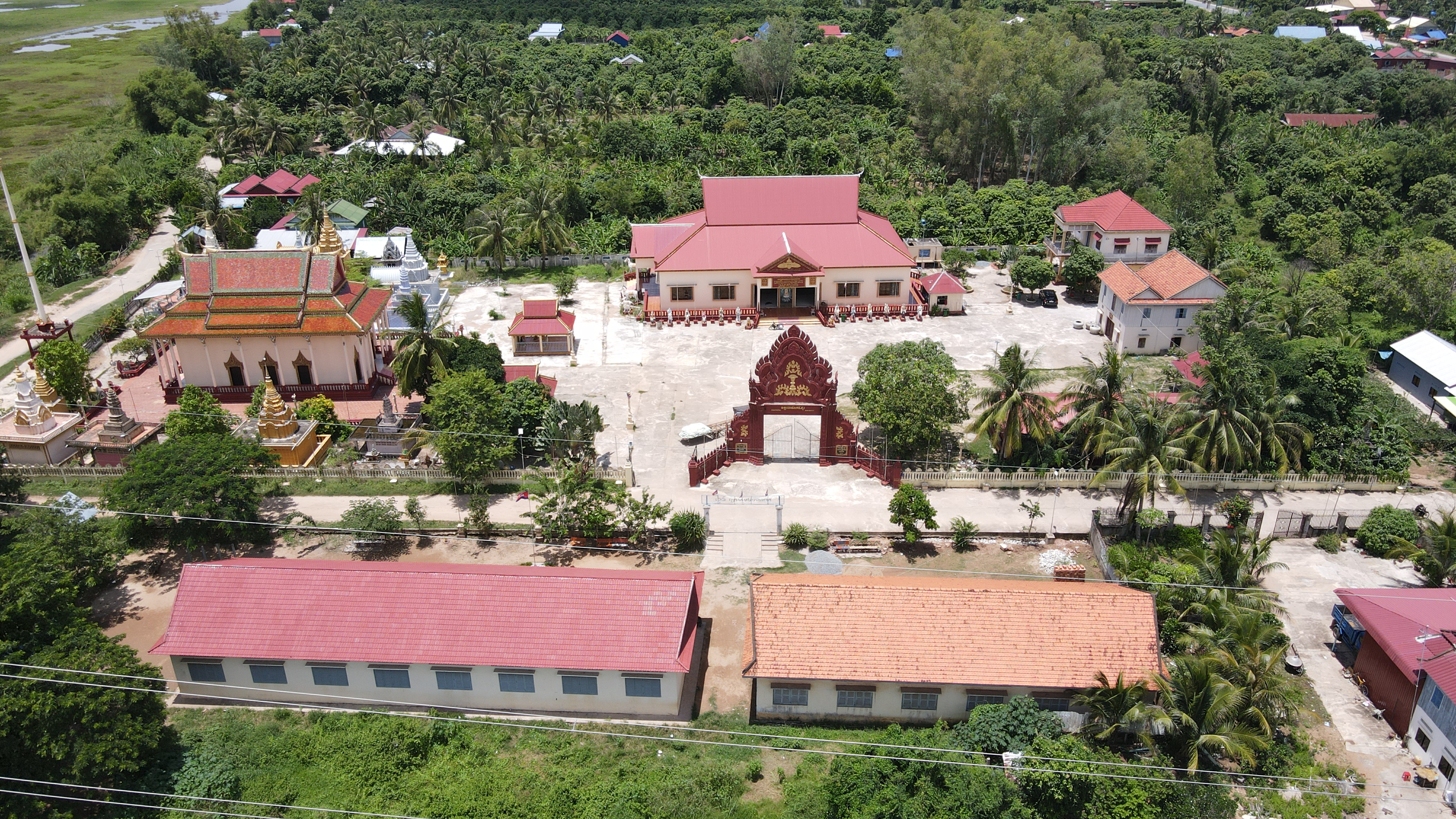
Aerial View of Wat Porthi Serey Dey Dos

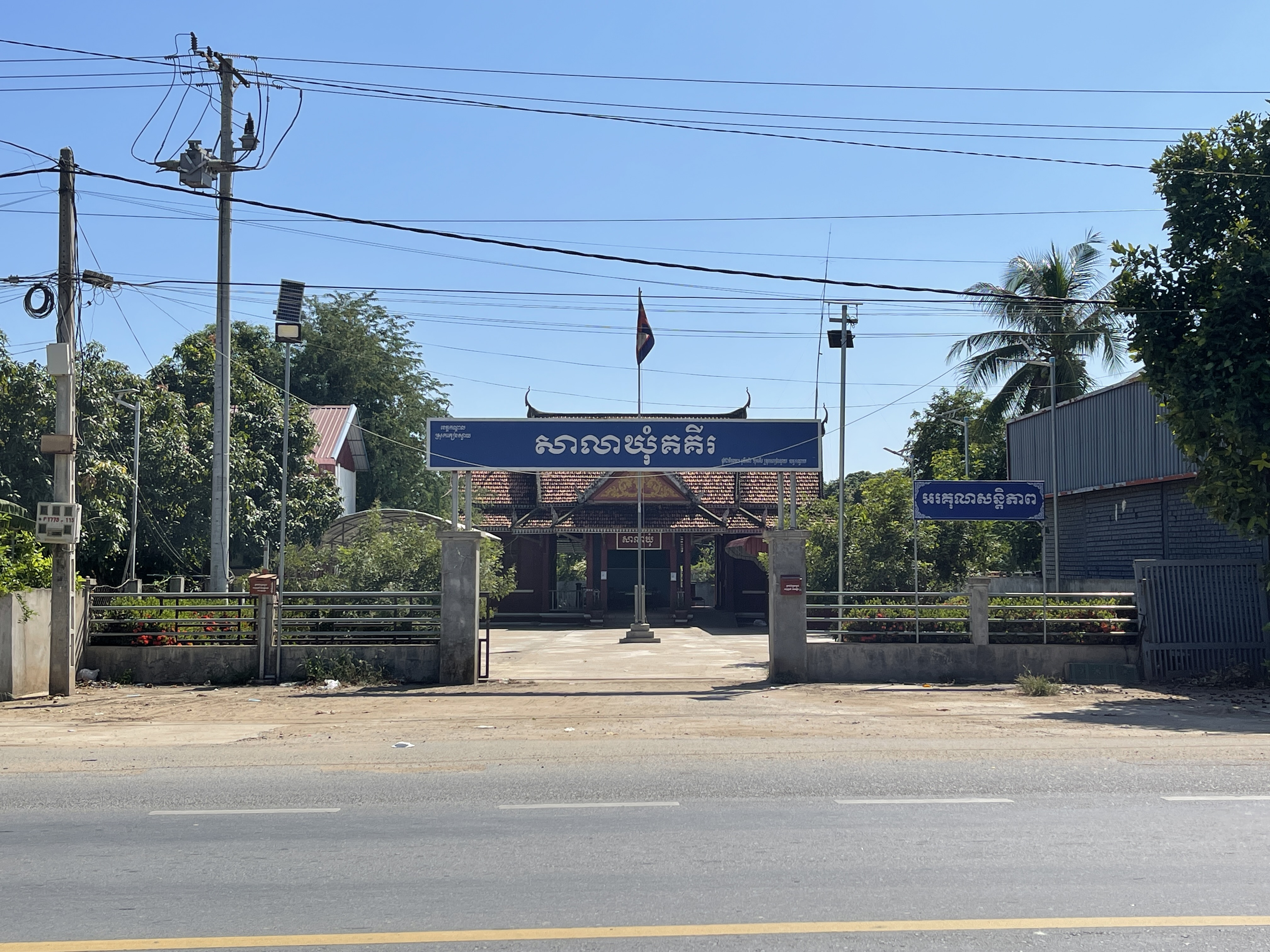
Kokir Commune Hall

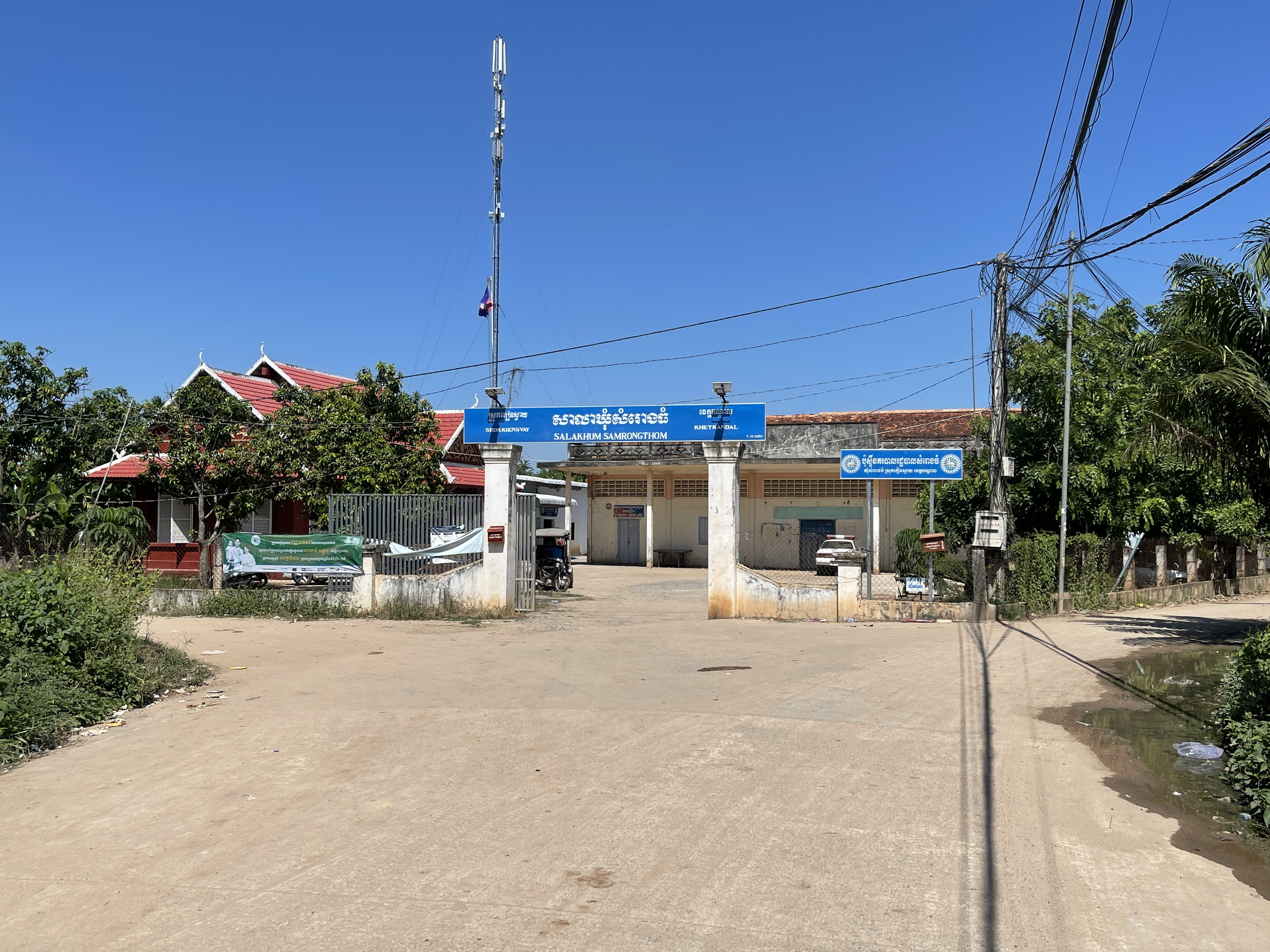
Samraong Thum Commune Hall

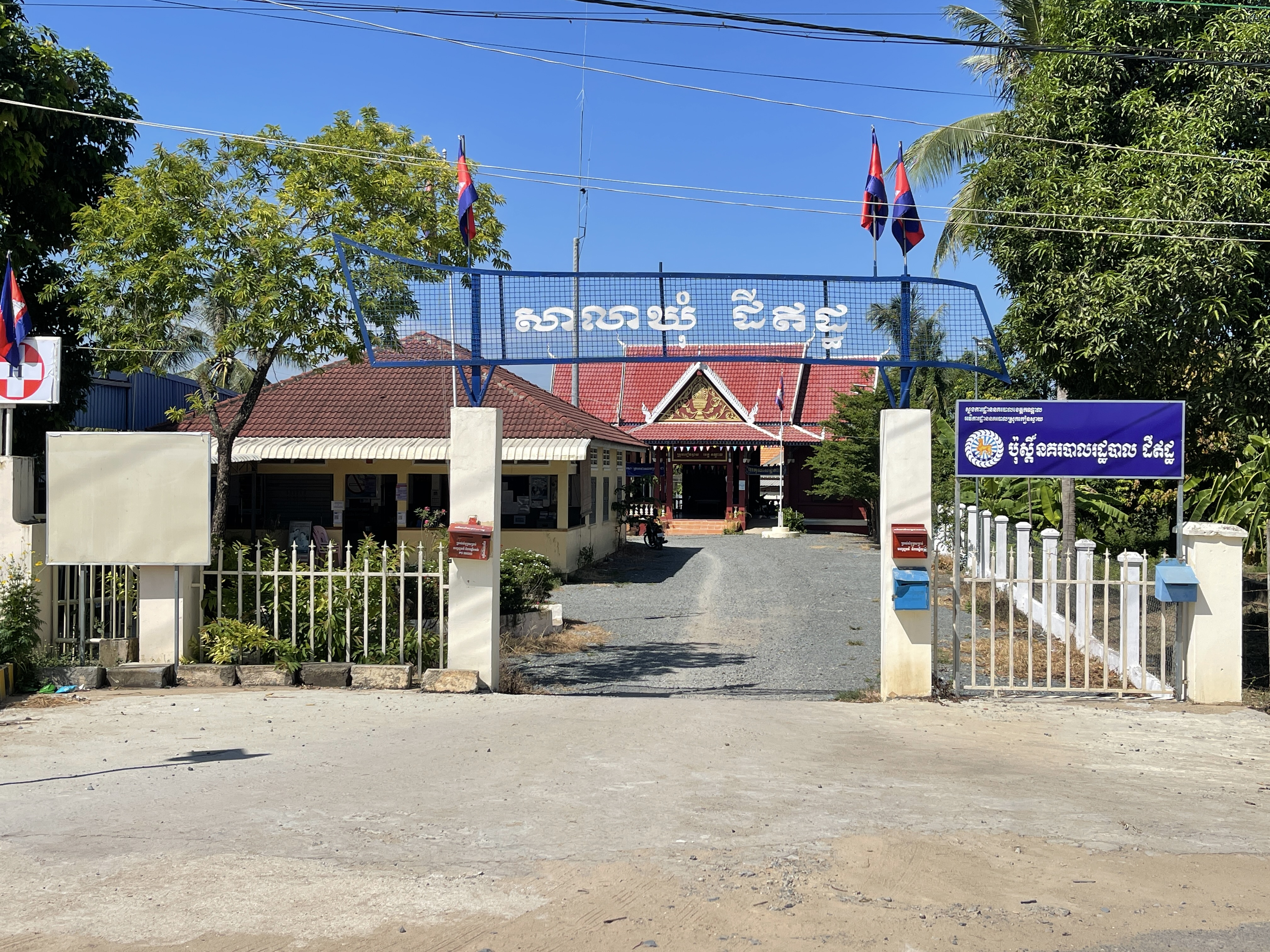
Dei Edth Commune Hall
