= Rovieng District =

Rovieng រវៀង រវៀង
- District (srok)
- Nickname: រវៀង
- Location in Cambodia
- Coordinates: 13°30′N 104°50′E
- Country: Cambodia
- Province: Preah Vihear
- Time zone: +7
- Geocode: 1305

Rovieng District is a district located in Preah Vihear Province, in northern Cambodia. According to the 1998 census of Cambodia, it had a population of 26,552.

== Administration ==
The following table shows the villages of Rovieng district by commune.

| Khum (Communes) | Phum (Villages) |
|---|---|
| Robieb | Rovieng Cheung, Tnaot Mlu, Tang Trak, Bak Kdaong, Boeng, Ou |
| Reaksmei | Damnak Chen, Ta Tong, Chambak Ph'aem, Trapeang Ruessei |
| Rohas | Thkaeng, Kampot, Sangkae Rung, Kak Poun, Chamlang, Anlong Svay |
| Rung Roeang | Thnal Kaeng, Rovieng Tboung, Boh Pey, Srae Thum |
| Rik Reay | Pal Hal, Boh, Doung |
| Ruos Roan | Chhnuon, Tonloab, Ruessei Srok |
| Rotanak | Ker, Khnar, Samreth, Samprieng, Prey Snuol |
| Rieb Roy | Slaeng Toul, Srae, Bangkan |
| Reaksa | Doun Ma, Samraong, Preal, Kak Poun, Rumdaoh, Sanlung Chey, Poleakkam, Sralau Sraong |
| Rumdaoh | Thnal Kaong, Svay Pat, Kouk Ampil, Ovloek |
| Romtum | Trapeang Totuem, Ou Talaok, Tuol Rovieng, Bangkaeun Phal, Svay Damnak Chas, Svay Damnak Thmei |
| Romoneiy | Rumchek, Ou Pour, Chi Aok, Phnum Daek, Srae Thnong |
