= Rumduol District =

Rumduol រំដួល
- District
- Location of Rumduol District
- Country: Cambodia
- Province: Svay Rieng
- Time zone: UTC+07:00 (ICT)
- Geocode: 2003

Rumduol (Khmer: រំដួល [rumɗuəl], lit. 'Metralla mesnyi flower') is a district located in Svay Rieng Province, Cambodia. The district is subdivided into 10 khums and 78 phums. According to the 1998 census of Cambodia, it has a population of 49,384.

== Toponymy ==
Rumduol (Khmer: រំដួល [rumɗuəl]) is derived from the Rumduol flower, scientifically known as Metrella mesnyi. The plant was proclaimed Cambodia's national flower in 2005 by royal decree, and is of cultural and ecological importance. Rumduol is not only a symbol of beauty but also holds cultural and medicinal significance. Several places in Cambodia share the name, reflecting the flower's prominence in the country.
