= Svay Chrum District =

Svay Chrum ស្រុកស្វាយជ្រំ
- District (srok)
- Location of Svay Chrum District
- Country: Cambodia
- Province: Svay Rieng
- Communes: 17
- Villages: 168
- Time zone: +7
- Geocode: 2005

Svay Chrum District (Khmer: ស្រុកស្វាយជ្រំ), lit. 'The Mango camp' is a district located in Svay Rieng Province, Cambodia. The district is subdivided into 17 khums (commune) and 168 phums (village). According to the 1998 census of Cambodia, it had a population of 129,573.
