= Pou Rieng district =

Pou Rieng ស្រុកពោធិ៍រៀង
- District (srok)
- Location in Cambodia
- Coordinates: 11.5515°N 105.2615°E
- Country: Cambodia
- Province: Prey Veng
- Communes: 6
- Villages: 31

Population (2008)
  - Total: 29,259
- Time zone: +7
- Geocode: 1411

Pou Rieng (Khmer: ស្រុកពោធិ៍រៀង), formerly Kampong Leav (Khmer: ស្រុកកំពង់លាវ), is a district located in Prey Veng province, in south-eastern Cambodia.

== Administration ==
According to the 1998 census, the Kampong Leav District consisted of 8 communes with a total population of 55,054. In 2008–2009 three communes—Baray, Cheung Tuek and Kampong Leav—formed a new district, the Prey Veng Municipality; according to the 2008 census, the population of the resulting five-commune district was 29,259.

In 2011 the district was renamed Pou Rieng (or Pur Rieng) and two communes which previously belonged to the Pea Reang district—Kampong Ruessei and Preaek Ta Sar—were added to the district. In 2019 the Ta Kao Commune was incorporated to the Prey Veng Municipality.

The following table shows the communes in the district as of 2020.

Code	Communes	Khmer
141101	Pou Rieng	ឃុំពោធិ៍រៀង
141102	Preaek Anteah	ឃុំព្រែកអន្ទះ
141103	Preaek Chrey	ឃុំព្រែកជ្រៃ
141104	Prey Kanlaong	ឃុំព្រៃកន្លោង
141106	Kampong Ruessei	ឃុំកំពង់ឫស្សី
141107	Preaek Ta Sar	ឃុំព្រែកតាសរ
