= Preah Sdach District =

Preah Sdach ព្រះស្ដេច
- District
- Preah Sdach District ស្រុកព្រះស្ដេច
- Location in Cambodia
- Coordinates: 11°5′N 105°21′E
- Country: Cambodia
- Province: Prey Veng

Population (1998)
  - Total: 106,459
- Time zone: UTC+7 (ICT)
- Geocode: 1409

Preah Sdach (Khmer: ព្រះស្ដេច, pronounced [prĕəh sɗac]; "Sacred Prince") is a district located in Prey Veng Province, in south eastern Cambodia. The most popular market of Preah Sdach District is Phsar Trea which is located in Trea Commune. The Japanese-Cambodian Friendship High School is also in this district.
