= Damber Bahadur Shahi =

Nepalese judge

Hon'ble Damber Bahadur Shahi डम्बरबहादुर शाही

Justice of Supreme Court of Nepal
- In office 10 October 2017 – 4 June 2020

Personal details
- Born: 10 July 1955 (age 69); Dadeldhura, Nepal
- Occupation: Justice

Damber Bahadur Shahi (Nepali: डम्बरबहादुर शाही) is a Nepalese judge. He is a former justice of the Supreme Court of Nepal.

== See also ==
- Deepak Raj Joshee
- Gopal Prasad Parajuli
