= Phnom Sruoch District =

Phnom Sruoch ភ្នំស្រួច
- District
- Phnom Sruoch District; ស្រុកភ្នំស្រួច
- Location in Cambodia
- Coordinates: 11°24′N 104°24′E
- Country: Cambodia
- Province: Kampong Speu
- Communes: 12
- Villages: 149

Population (2019)
  - Total: 104,438
- Time zone: UTC+07:00 (ICT)
- Geocode: 0506

Phnom Sruoch (Khmer: ភ្នំស្រួច [pʰnom sruəc]) is a district located in Kampong Speu Province in central Cambodia.

== Ecology ==
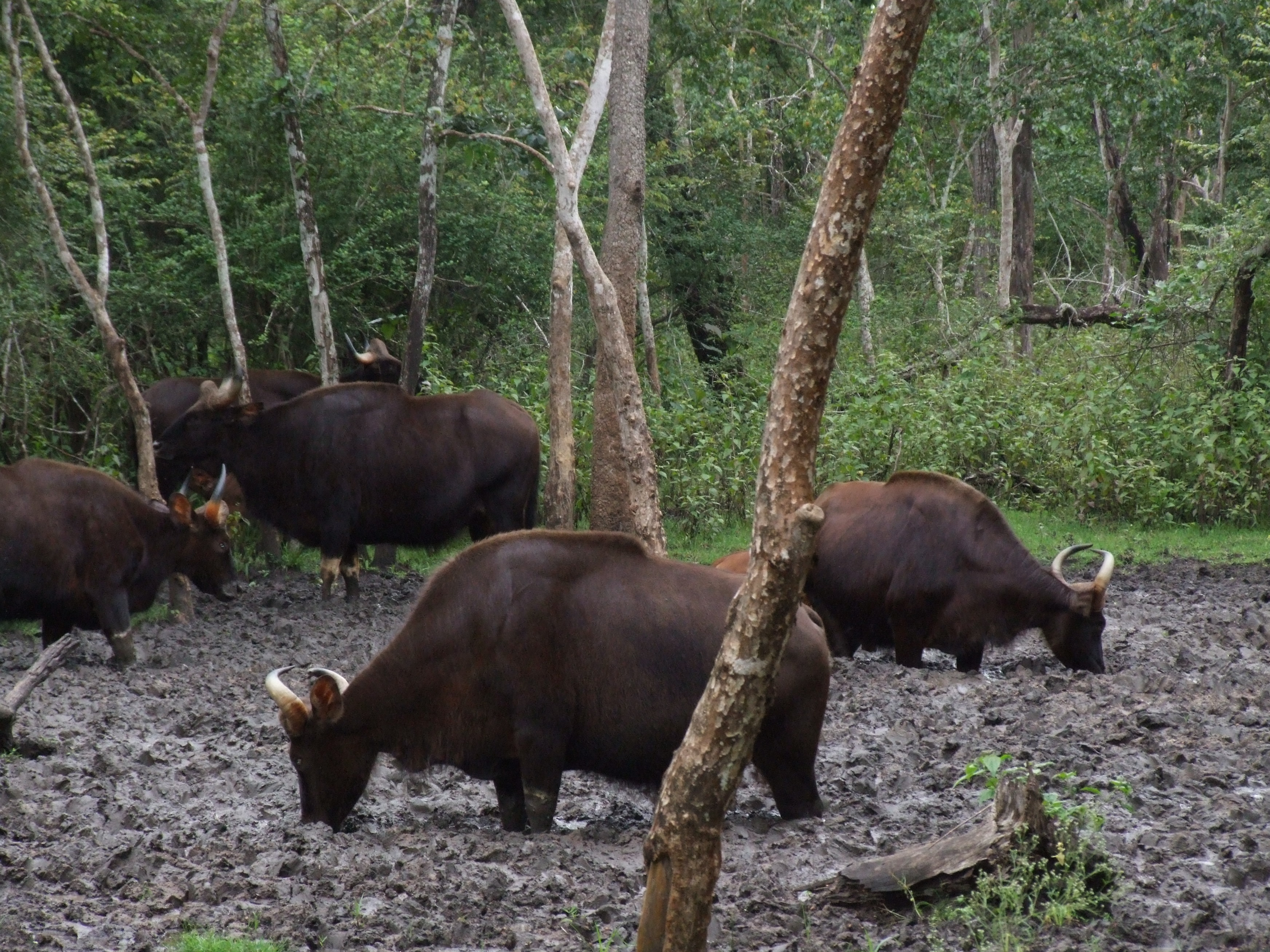
Wild gaur

The largest surface of Kirirom National Park is part of Phnom Sruoch District, Kampong Speu, while another section is in neighboring Koh Kong Province.

The Kirirom National Park is located in the eastern part of the Cardamom Mountains, about 112 km from Phnom Penh. The road from Phnom Penh to Kampong Som runs along the southern boundary of the park.

Among the animals in the park, the following deserve mention: Asian elephant, deer, gaur, banteng, leopard, spotted linsang, pileated gibbon and tiger.

== Administration ==
Phnom Sruoch District is subdivided into 12 communes (khum)

Geocode	Name
050601	Chambak Commune
050602	Choam Sangkae Commune
050603	Dambouk Rung Commune
050604	Kiri Voan Commune
050605	Krang Dei Vay Commune
050606	Moha Sang Commune
050607	Ou Commune
050608	Prey Rumduol Commune
050609	Prey Kmeng Commune
050610	Tang Samraong Commune
050611	Tang Sya Commune
050613	Traeng Trayueng Commune
