= Siem Bouk District =

Siem Bouk សៀមបូក
- District (srok)
- Interactive map of Siem Bouk
- Country: Cambodia
- Province: Stung Treng
- Time zone: +7
- Geocode: 1902

Siem Bouk District is a district (srok)located in Stung Treng Province, in north-east Cambodia. According to the 1998 census of Cambodia, it had a population of 10,235.
