= Angkor Ban =

Angkor Ban អង្គរបាន
- Commune
- Location within Cambodia
- Coordinates: 13°21′51″N 102°31′18″E
- Country: Cambodia
- Province: Province
- District: Sampov Loun
- Time zone: UTC+07:00 (ICT)
- Geocode: 021002

Angkor Ban (Khmer: អង្គរបាន, Ângkôr Ban [ʔɑŋkɔː ɓaːn]) is a commune (khum) of Sampov Loun District in Battambang Province in northwestern Cambodia.

== Villages ==
| Name | Khmer |
|---|---|
| Andoung Pir | អន្ដូងពីរ |
| Kbal Hong | ក្បាលហុង |
| Pralay Prak | ប្រឡាយប្រាក់ |
| Tuek Phos | ទឹកផុស |
| Tuek Thla | ទឹកថ្លា |
