= Peam Chor District =

Peam Chor ពាមជរ
- District
- Peam Chor District ស្រុកពាមជរ
- Location in Cambodia
- Coordinates: 11°6′N 105°14′E
- Country: Cambodia
- Province: Prey Veng

Population (1998)
  - Total: 66,413
- Time zone: UTC+7 (ICT)
- Geocode: 1406

Peam Chor (Khmer: ពាមជរ, pronounced [piəm.cɔː]) is a district (srok) located in Prey Veng Province, in south eastern Cambodia.

== Administrative divisions ==
The district contains 10 communes:

- Angkor Angk
- Kampong Prasat
- Kaoh Chek
- Kaoh Roka
- Kaoh Sampov
- Krang Ta Yang
- Preaek Krabau
- Preaek Sambuor
- Ruessei Srok
- Svay Phluoh
