= International School of Siem Reap =

Coordinates: 13°20′57″N 103°51′30″E

ISSR - International School of Siem Reap.
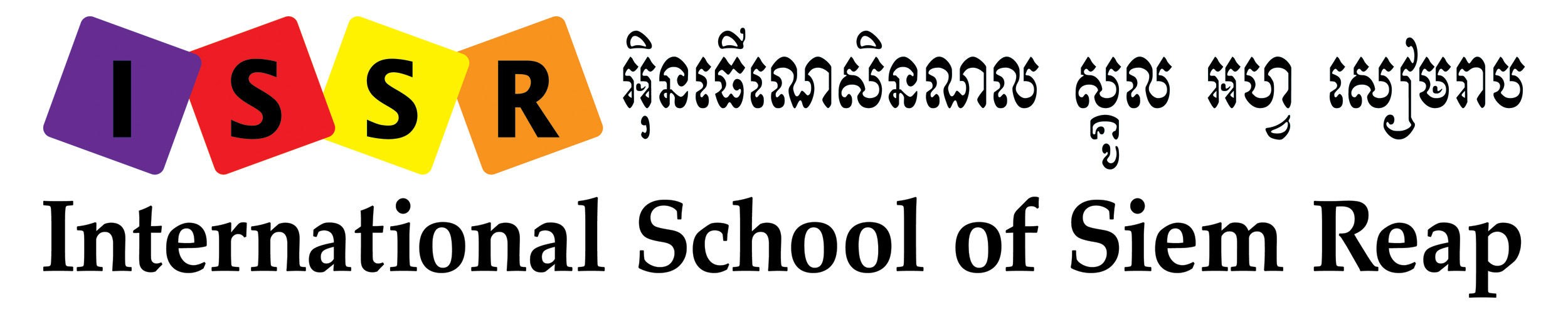
- (Cambodia) (United Kingdom) Siem Reap, Siem Reap Province; Cambodia

Information
- Type: K-12, private, international, co-education, National Curriculum (England, Wales and Northern Ireland), Cambridge International Examinations, British International Schools, International General Certificate of Secondary Education
- Established: 2007
- Employees: over 120
- Key people: Sinead Amat (Co-Head of School & Principal, Primary); Peter Greener (Co-Head of School & Principal, Secondary); Channy John (Administration)
- Enrollment: over 300
- School fees: 1500 to 7000 USD per annum (2014)
- Website: issr.edu.kh

The International School of Siem Reap (ISSR) is a private, International School in Siem Reap, Cambodia. It accepts both expats and local Khmer students - full fee paying and sponsored students. It is the largest international primary and secondary school in Siem Reap.

== Curriculum ==
The International School of Siem Reap (ISSR) has over 300 students aged between 2 and 18 years from over 20 nationalities. The school adheres to the English National curriculum National Curriculum for England in primary school and the Cambridge Assessment International Education (CAIE or simply Cambridge) International General Certificate of Secondary Education IGCSE curriculum in high school (secondary school). For local Khmer students who wish to attend university in Cambodia ISSR provides a dual curriculum of both Khmer and English curriculum allowing for matriculation in both. French and Chinese modern foreign languages are offered within the school curriculum.

== Accreditation ==
ISSR The International School of Siem Reap is fully accredited by Cambridge International Examinations and offers IGCSE International General Certificate of Secondary Education exams.

== Location ==
ISSR is split into two campuses. The high school recently re-located to the previous Primary school building on Sala Lodge Road near the ring road. A new Infants and primary school campus was constructed and opened in August 2019 and is located on the Ring Road, Kor Kranh, near the Siem Reap River on the western side.
