= Svay Theab District =

Coordinates: 11°6′32″N 105°56′24″E

Svay Theab ស្រុកស្វាយទាប
- District (srok)
- Location of Svay Teab District
- Country: Cambodia
- Province: Svay Rieng
- Communes: 11
- Villages: 86
- Time zone: +7
- Geocode: 2007

Svay Theab District (Khmer: ស្រុកស្វាយទាប), lit. 'The Short mango' is a district located in Svay Rieng Province, Cambodia. The district is subdivided into 11 khums and 86 phums. According to the 1998 census of Cambodia, it had a population of 59,650. Most people are farmers. Many villagers sent their teenage children to work in the factory in Phnom Penh.
