= Sandan District =

Sandan ស្រុកសណ្ដាន់
- District (srok)
- Location in Cambodia
- Country: Cambodia
- Province: Kampong Thom
- Time zone: +7
- Geocode: 0606

Sandan (Khmer: ស្រុកសណ្ដាន់) is a district within Kampong Thom Province, in central Cambodia. According to the 1998 census of Cambodia, it had a population of 38,574.

== Administration ==
The following table shows the villages of Sandan District by commune.

Khum (Communes)	Phum (Villages)
Chheu Teal	Chheu Teal, Boeng Rolum, Kampong Ta Baen, Samret, Veal Pring Kraom, Kae Rang, Boeng Pra, Andoung Pring, Prey Kanlaeng, Choam Phka, Konlong Khting
Dang Kambet	Srae Khsach, Srae Veal Khang Lech, Srae Veal Khang Kaeut, Sampoar Touch, Sampoar Thum
Klaeng	Peam Klaeng, Roka Chuor, Tuek Vil, Prey Choar, Klaeng, Kampout Chhuk, Trakuon, Angkor Sen Chey
Mean Rith	Kantir, Boeng, Sam Aong, Choam Svay, Tboung Tuek, Trapeang Tralach, Rang Khnay, Ou Pok Sameakki
Mean Chey	Chek Muoy Stong, Veal Snay, Roneam, Trabaek, Rumpuh, Choan Leaeng, Choam Phal, Samrom, Popueng, Phtoul, Thmei
Ngan	Dang Totueng, Khmer, Krang Daeum, Rovieng, Sralau, Ngan, Samphi, Troeb, Veal Pring Leu, Tang Krasau, Krabei Prey, Ou Tnaot, Svay
Sandan	Danghet, Chhuk, Krasang, Srae Chang, Prasat Andaet, Kbal Khla, Svay, Chor, Tuek Mleang, Sandan, Kampong Trabaek, Ba Chey, Prey Kokir
Sochet	Rumchek, Krang, Pou Roung, Tayang, Ansa, Pren, Srae Pring
Tum Ring	Leaeng, Roneam, Ronteah, Tum Ar, Kbal Damrei, Samraong, Sralau Sraong, Khaos
