= Sithor Kandal District =

Sithor Kandal ស្រុកស៊ីធរកណ្ដាល
- District (srok)
- Location in Cambodia
- Coordinates: 11°46′N 105°22′E
- Country: Cambodia
- Province: Prey Veng
- Communes: 11
- Villages: 60

Population (1998)
  - Total: 61,796
- Time zone: +7
- Geocode: 1412

Sithor Kandal District (Khmer: ស្រុកស៊ីធរកណ្ដាល) is a district located in Prey Veng Province, in south eastern Cambodia.
