= Sampov Lun District =

Sampov Lun សំពៅលូន
- District (srok)
- Location in Cambodia
- Country: Cambodia
- Province: Battambang
- Communes: 6

Population (1998)
  - Total: 12,518
- Time zone: UTC+07:00 (ICT)

Sampov Lun District (Khmer: សំពៅលូន, UNGEGN: Sâmpŏu Lun [sɑmpɨw luːn]) is a district (srok) of Battambang Province, in northwestern Cambodia.

== Administration ==
The district is subdivided into six communes (khum).

=== Communes and villages ===
Khum (Commune)	Phum (Villages)
Sampov Lun	Thnal Bat, Thnal Bambaek, Kaoh Touch, Tuol Chrey
Angkor Ban	Kbal Hong, Pralay Prak, Andoung Pir, Tuek Phos, Tuek Thla
Ta Sda	Veal Vong, Ta Sda, Chamkar Lhong, Koun Phnum Cheung, Koun Phnum Tboung
Santepheap	Ou, Kilou Dabbei, Trapeang Prolit
Serei Mean Chey	Sralau Chrum, Chheu Teal, Pou Chrey, Ou Trav Chu
Chrey Seima	Ou Lvea, Spean Youl, Reaksmei, Kilou Prambuon, Chambak
