= National Highway 6 (Cambodia) =

Road in Cambodia

National Highway 6

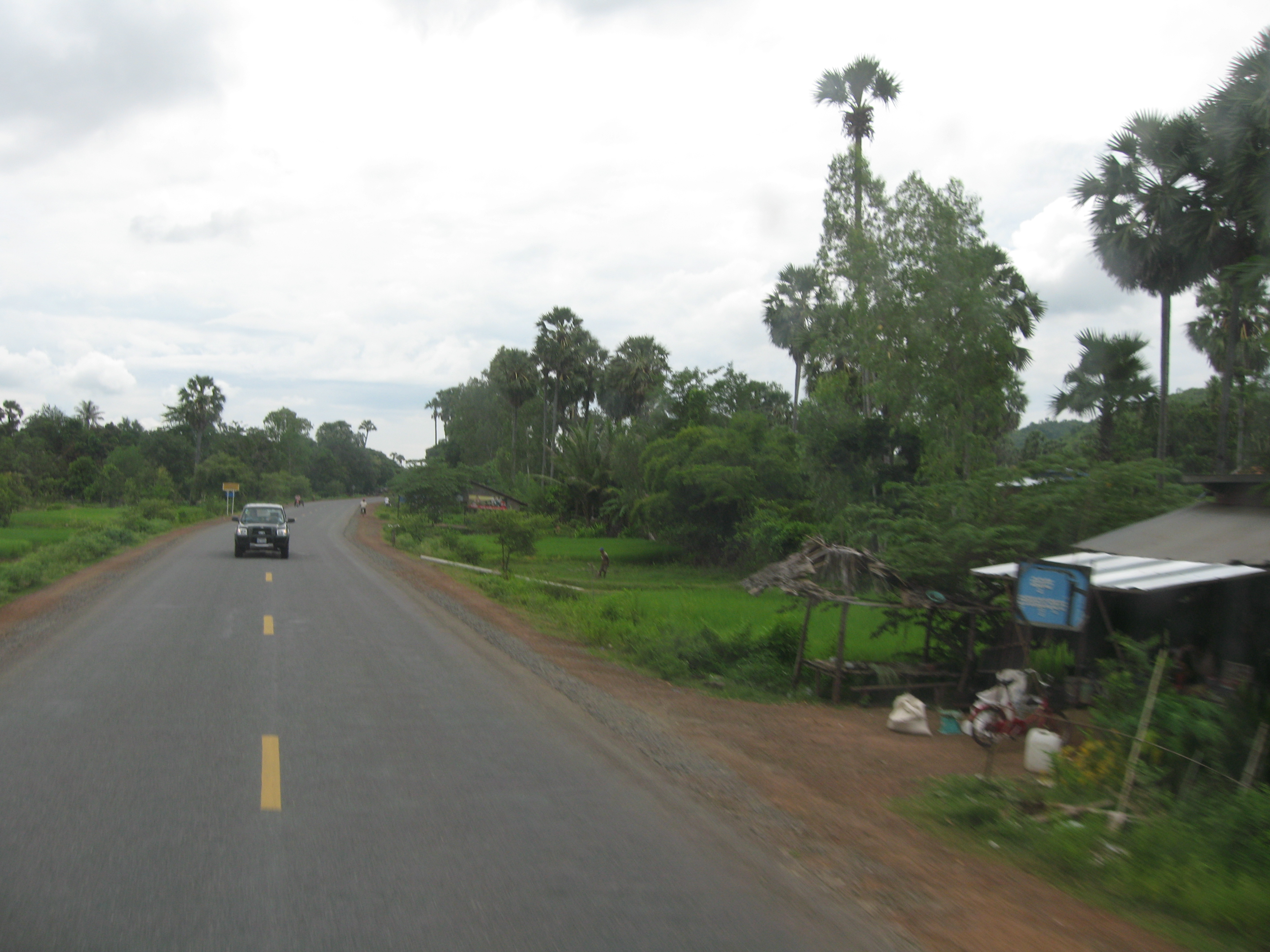
- National Highway 6

Route information
- Part of AH11

Location
- Country: Cambodia

Highway system
- Transport in Cambodia

National Highway 6 or National Road No.6 (10006) is one of the national highways of Cambodia. It is 416 km (258 mi) long (including 6A), it connects the capital of Phnom Penh with Banteay Meanchey through Siem Reap on the north shore of the Tonlé Sap. It terminates merging into the National Highway 5.

== National Highway 6A ==
From Phnom Penh to the town of Skuon (73 km (45 mi)), where it connects with National Highway 7, the highway has been upgraded to dual carriageway and it bears the name of National Highway 6A.
