= Mukh Kampul District =

Mukh Kampul ស្រុកមុខកំពូល
- District
- Location in Cambodia
- Coordinates: 11°44′32″N 104°58′51″E
- Country: Cambodia
- Province: Kandal
- Communes: 7
- Villages: 39

Population (1998)
  - Total: 77,456
- Time zone: UTC+7 (ICT)
- Geocode: 0807

Mukh Kampul (Khmer: ស្រុកមុខកំពូល) is a district (srok) of Kandal Province, Cambodia. The district is subdivided into 9 communes (khum) such as Bak Khaeng, Kaoh Dach, Preaek Anhchanh, Preaek Dambang, Roka Kaong Muoy, Roka Kaong Pir, Ruessei Chrouy, Sambuor Meas, Svay Ampear and 47 villages (phum).
