= Khsach Kandal District =

Khsach Kandal ស្រុកខ្សាច់កណ្តាល
- District (srok)
- Location in Cambodia
- Coordinates: 11°44′54″N 105°0′41″E
- Country: Cambodia
- Province: Kandal
- Communes: 18
- Villages: 93

Population (1998)
  - Total: 105,345
- Time zone: +7
- Geocode: 0803

Khsach Kandal District (Khmer: ស្រុកខ្សាច់កណ្តាល) is a district (srok) of Kandal Province, Cambodia. The district is subdivided into 18 communes (khum) such as Bak Dav, Chey Thum, Kampong Chamlang, Kaoh Chouram, Kaoh Oknha Tei, Preah Prasab, Preaek Ampil, Preaek Luong, Preaek Ta Kov, Preaek Ta Meak, Puk Ruessei, Roka Chonlueng, Sanlung, Sithor, Svay Chrum, Svay Romiet, Ta Aek, Vihear Suork and 93 villages (phum).
