= National Highway 7 (Cambodia) =

Road in Cambodia

National Highway 7

Route information
- Part of AH11

Location
- Country: Cambodia

Highway system
- Transport in Cambodia

National Highway 7, or National Road No.7 (10007), Asian Highway 11, is one of the national highways of Cambodia. With a length of 509.17 km, it connects Skuon with Trapeang Kreal, an international border checkpoint with Laos. It is part of the Asian Highway Network and of the connection by road between Phnom Penh and Vientiane, joining Route 13 in Laos leading north along the Mekong to Luang Prabang.

In November 2004, it was announced that the road would be partly rebuilt by China's Shanghai Construction Group with the assistance of the Chinese government. The public work, costing about US$80 million in total, was officially inaugurated on 29 April 2008.
