= Bahal =

Bahal may refer to:

- Bahal, Cambodia
- Bahal, India
- Bahal, Indonesia, a village in North Sumatra, Indonesia
  - Bahal temple, an 11th-century Buddhist temple in Bahal, Indonesia
- Bahal, Iran
- Bahal, Nepal, a type of courtyard
- Bahal Tambunan, Indonesian geoscientist
- Seniehun or Bahal, Sierra Leone
- Te Bahal, the largest bahal (courtyard) in Kathmandu, Nepal
- Bahal, an alcoholic drink that is a precursor to the bahalina palm wine of the Philippines
