= Pal Hal Village =

Village in Cambodia

Pal Hal
- ភូមិប៉ាលហាល
- Location of Pal Hal
- Coordinates: 13.787726°N 104.963271°E

Pal Hal (Khmer: ភូមិប៉ាលហាល) is a village in Sangkat Pal Hal, Krong Preah Vihear (City).

Previously, it was in Pal Hal Commune of Tbaeng Meanchey District, Preah Vihear Province, Cambodia. According to the 1998 Census of Cambodia, it had a population of 719 persons.
