= Tumnob Rolok =

Tumnob Rolok ឃុំទំនប់រលក
- Commune
- Location within Cambodia
- Coordinates: 10°42′35.57″N 103°40′15.62″E
- Country: Cambodia
- Province: Sihanoukville
- District: Steung Hav

Population (2008)
  - Total: 13,040
- Time zone: UTC+7

Tumnob Rolok (Khmer: ឃុំទំនប់រលក) is a khum (commune) of Stueng Hav District in Sihanoukville Province, Cambodia.
