= Preah Vihear (disambiguation) =

Preah Vihear is a Hindu temple in Cambodia.

Preah Vihear may also refer to:

- Preah Vihear province, province of Cambodia, named after the temple
- Preah Vihear (town), capital of Preah Vihear province
