= Khowshgizu =

Khowshgizu خوش گيزو
- Village
- Location within Iran
- Coordinates: 25°55′47″N 57°42′07″E
- Country: Iran
- Province: Hormozgan
- County: Jask
- Bakhsh: Central
- Rural District: Jask

Population (2006)
  - Total: 56
- Time zone: UTC+3:30 (IRST)
  - Summer (DST): UTC+4:30 (IRDT)

Khowshgizu (Persian: خوش گيزو, also Romanized as Khowshgīzū; also known as Khowshgīrū) is a village in Jask Rural District, in the Central District of Jask County, Hormozgan Province, Iran. At the 2006 census, its population was 56, in 13 families.
