= Koveyk-e Bala =

Koveyk-e Bala كويك بالا
- Village
- Interactive map of Koveyk-e Bala
- Country: Iran
- Province: Hormozgan
- County: Jask
- Bakhsh: Central
- Rural District: Jask

Population (2006)
  - Total: 194
- Time zone: UTC+3:30 (IRST)
  - Summer (DST): UTC+4:30 (IRDT)

Koveyk-e Bala (Persian: كويك بالا, also Romanized as Koveyk-e Bālā) is a village in Jask Rural District, in the Central District of Jask County, Hormozgan Province, Iran. At the 2006 census, its population was 194, in 39 families.
