= Kampong Seila (commune) =

Kampong Seila ឃុំកំពង់សីលា
- Commune
- Location within Cambodia
- Coordinates: 11°8′26″N 103°56′59″E
- Country: Cambodia
- Province: Sihanoukville
- District: Kampong Seila

Population (2008)
  - Total: 6,942
- Time zone: UTC+7

Kampong Seila (Khmer: ឃុំកំពង់សីលា) is a khum (commune) of Kampong Seila District in Sihanoukville Province, Cambodia.

== Villages ==
- Cham Srei
- Krang At
- Thmei
- Veal
