= Sok Touch =

President of the Royal Academy of Cambodia

- សុខ ទូច
- Born: 1965 (age 60–61); Srey Santhor District, Kampong Cham Province, Cambodia
- Occupations: Historian, political scientist, academic
- Children: 3

Academic background
- Education: Voronezh State University

Sok Touch (Khmer: សុខ ទូច; born 1965) is a Cambodian intellectual and current president of the Royal Academy of Cambodia and as such is considered "the government’s top academic".

== Biography ==
=== Childhood and studies ===
Sok Touch was born in Takoy Village, Prek Dambok Commune, Srey Santhor District, Kampong Cham Province.

In 1989, before the fall of the Soviet Union, Sok Touch was sent to Voronezh State University where he obtained first his Bachelor of Science in Political Science in 1995, then his Master of Political Science in 1996 before coming out from the university in 1999 with a Doctorate in Political History with a dissertation focusing on the United Nations' role in Cambodia's conflicts.

=== Academic career in Cambodia ===
In 2001, Sok Touch was hired as an administrative officer of the Institute of Humanities and Social Sciences of the Royal Academy of Cambodia and was the Director of the Communicable Disease Control Department in Phnom Penh, before in 2003 becoming the Director of History and Political Science of this Institute. From 2005 to 2015, he was Vice President (Deputy Director General) of the Institute of International Relations of Cambodia of the Royal Academy of Cambodia while he also defended conservative cultural values as Chairman of the Political Science Commission of the National Council for the Khmer Language from 2011 to 2015, of which he is still a member.

=== Leading the Royal Academy of Cambodia ===
Sok Touch began being more involved in Cambodian politics in 2012 when he became advisor to the Office of the Council of Ministers. In 2015, he was promoted as President of the Institute of International Relations of Cambodia of the Royal Academy of Cambodia and had a rank equivalent as Secretary of State in 2016 when he was appointed Vice President of the Royal Academy of Cambodia.

In October 2015, a man was accused of posting a Facebook death threat against Cambodian researcher Sok Touch in which he showed of a pistol and bullets captioned “they [are] for killing the PhD guy who changes Cambodia’s history; the PhD who sold himself to Vietnam”; the man was shown no leniency in court as he was sentenced to a fine and six month in jail.

After being appointed as a member of the Royal Academy of Cambodia, he was named President of this Academy in 2017 with rank equivalent to Minister in replacement of Lok Chumteav Clot Thida. Since reaching that position, Sok Touch has presented himself as a reformist and required all the members of the academy to raise their standards and become more involved in research works and scientific publications. His reformist views extend to the Khmer sangha arguing that more disciplinary measures should be taken against the monks' unsuitable actions.

In 2018, while human rights advocate lamented the dissolution by the Supreme Court of Cambodia of the Cambodian National Rescue Party, Sok Touch branded this dissolution as the ‘strengthening of democracy’, as he considered, with others, that the divisive attitude and speech of Sam Rainsy created division in the Khmer nation.

In 2021, at the behest of the government, Sok Touch studied and investigated the challenges facing the Tonle Sap Lake, and pleaded to restore endangered species of fish threatened by heavy fishing in the protected areas.

== Positions ==
=== Reform of higher public offices in Cambodia ===
Sok Touch has asked for an imminent reform of higher public offices in order to resorbate the inflation of generals in Cambodia. Touch also urged a review of obese and unfit senior officers of the National Police and Royal Cambodian Armed Forces, a suggestion which was previously mentioned by Interior Minister Sar Kheng.

=== Defining the borders of Cambodia ===
In what is a very delicate topic of Cambodian politics, Sok Touch has been entrusted with the mission to establish GPS precision border maps of Cambodia since 2016. While he has been criticized for rejecting the frivolous claim to Khmer sovereignty over Koh Tral, nowadays known as Phu Quoc in Vietnamese, which has been under the control of Vietnam since 1933 and confirmed in 1953, he has defended the territorial of sovereignty of Cambodia while insisting on the necessity of peaceful diplomatic relationships, in line with the Win-Win policy promoted by Hun Sen:

In the 21st century, I believe that Cambodia has never viewed any country to be unfriendly or an enemy. We continue to cooperate with all friends around the globe.

— Sok Touch

=== Respecting Cambodian traditions of New Year ===
While Cambodians tend to respect the traditions of Khmer New Year, Sok Touch has been vociferous about his condemnation of water battles in the city of Siem Reap and around the archeological site of Angkor Wat, games which he considers disrespectful of the sacred character of the city.

== Publications ==
- 2002: ចលនាភូមិមួយផលិតផលមួយ (One Village, One Product Movement)
- 2003: តួនាទីអង្គការសហប្រជាជាតិ (The role of the United Nations)
- 2003: ទ្រឹស្តីទំនាក់ទំនងអន្តរជាតិ (Theory of International Relations)
- 2007: ទំនាក់ទំនងរវាងកម្ពុជាជាមួយសហរដ្ឋអាមេរិក ចិន និងវៀតណាម២០០៧ (Cambodia-US relations, China and Vietnam)
- 2008: វេទិកាបណ្ឌិតសភាលើកទី៣ ស្ដីពី ខួបទី១៥ឆ្នាំ នៃកិច្ចព្រម ព្រៀង សន្ដិភាព ក្រុង ប៉ារីស ស្ដីពីដំណោះ ស្រាយ នយោបាយរួមនៅកម្ពុជា (Third Academy Forum on the 15th Anniversary of the Paris Peace Accords on a Common Political Solution in Cambodia)
- 2008: ទស្សនាវដ្ដីវិទ្យាសាស្ដ្ររបស់វិទ្យាស្ថានទំនាក់ទំនងអន្ដរជាតិកម្ពុជា លេខ១ (Scientific Journal of the Institute of International Relations of Cambodia No. 1)
- 2009: ទំនាក់ទំនងអន្តរជាតិ ៖ កម្ពុជាក្រោមក្រសែភ្នែកមហាអំណាច (International Relations: Kampuchea Krom in the Eyes of Superpowers)
- 2009: Cambodia After the Paris Peace Agreement
- 2009: ទស្សនាវដ្ដីវិទ្យាសាស្ដ្ររបស់វិទ្យាស្ថានទំនាក់ទំនងអន្ដរជាតិកម្ពុជា លេខ២ (Scientific Journal of the Institute of International Relations of Cambodia No. 2)
- 2010: ទស្សនាវដ្ដីវិទ្យាសាស្ដ្ររបស់វិទ្យាស្ថានទំនាក់ទំនងអន្ដរជាតិកម្ពុជា លេខ៣ (Scientific Journal of the Institute of International Relations of Cambodia No. 3)
- 2010: ទំនាស់ព្រំដែនរវាងប្រទេសថៃ និងប្រទេសជិតខាង បោះពុម្ពផ្សាយ ដោយ វិទ្យាស្ថាន ទំនាក់ទំនងអន្តរជាតិនៃរាជបណ្ឌិត្យសភាកម្ពុជា (Border Disputes between Thailand and Neighbors Published by the Institute of International Relations of the Royal Academy of Cambodia)
- 2011: ទស្សនាវដ្ដីវិទ្យាសាស្ដ្ររបស់វិទ្យាស្ថានទំនាក់ទំនងអន្ដរជាតិកម្ពុជា លេខ៤ (Scientific Journal of the Institute of International Relations of Cambodia No. 4)
- 2015: នយោបាយការបរទេស ៖ ម្សិលមិញ ថ្ងៃនេះ និងថ្ងៃស្អែក (Foreign Policy: Yesterday, Today and Tomorrow)
- 2016: អាស៊ាន-រុស្ស៊ី ក្នុងបរិបទពិភពលោកថ្មី (ASEAN-Russia in the New World Context)
- 2017: ជម្លោះព្រំដែនកម្ពុជា-ឡាវ៖ ពីតំបន់អូរអាឡៃដល់ចំណុចប្រសព្វនៃខេត្តអាតាពើ (Cambodia-Laos border conflict: from O'Alay to the junction of Attapeu province)

== Awards and recognitions ==
- March 2011: Royal Order of Sahametrei of Maha Sena Class by Royal Decree No. NS / RKOT / 0311/257
- July 2009: Royal Order of Monisaraphon of Maha Sena Class by Royal Decree No. NS / RKOT / 0609/656)
- April 2006: Royal Order of Monisaraphon, Sena Class by Sub-Decree No. 230
