= Royal Academy of Cambodia =

- រាជបណ្ឌិត្យសភាកម្ពុជា (Khmer); Académie royale du Cambodge (French)
- Type: National research
- Established: 25 August 1965; 60 years ago
- President: Dr. Sok Touch
- Location: Russian Federation Blvd, Phnom Penh, Cambodia
- Nickname: RAC
- Website: rac.gov.kh

The Royal Academy of Cambodia (RAC; Khmer: រាជបណ្ឌិត្យសភាកម្ពុជា, UNGEGN: Réachôbândĭtyâsâphéa Kâmpŭchéa, ALA-LC: Rājapaṇḍityasabhā Kambujā; French: Académie royale du Cambodge) is the national academy and university of Cambodia. RAC was originally established by a Royal Decree of 25 August 1965 and placed under the Office of the Council of Ministers. However, by the time war broke out in Cambodia in 1970 it had still not started operations, and in the following years it disappeared completely amidst the turmoil of the Khmer Rouge period. Efforts to revive the Royal Academy began in March 1997 with the establishment of the Academy of Cambodian History, later the Academy of History. In 1999 this institution became the Royal Academy of Cambodia (RAC), with five sub institutes - the Institute of Biology, Medicine and Agriculture, the Institute of Culture and Fine Arts, the Institute of Humanities and Social Sciences, the Institute of National Language, and the Institute of Science and Technology.

On July 17, 2009, Lok Chumteav Klot Thida was sworn in as president of the academy. The previous president, Sorn Samnang, now serves as an advisor to the Cambodian government.

Prime Minister Hun Sen officially became a member of the Royal Academy of Cambodia in a ceremony held here on April 28. He was appointed as a full member of the Royal Academy of Cambodia by King Norodom Sihamoni in recognition of his competence in leading the country.

Reestablished in 1999, the Royal Academy of Cambodia, the country's leading research and training institution, has currently 18 full members. The academy offers master and doctoral programs, with an emphasis on social sciences.

The academy serves as the governing body for Techo Sen Russey Treb Cambodian Royal Academy Park in Preah Vihear province, a protected area established in 2014.

== See also ==
Royal Academy of Cambodia website
