= Zevadu =

Zevadu زوادو
- Village
- Location within Iran
- Coordinates: 25°56′53″N 57°50′11″E
- Country: Iran
- Province: Hormozgan
- County: Jask
- Bakhsh: Central
- Rural District: Jask

Population (2006)
  - Total: 73
- Time zone: UTC+3:30 (IRST)
  - Summer (DST): UTC+4:30 (IRDT)

Zevadu (Persian: زوادو, also Romanized as Zevādū) is a village in Jask Rural District, in the Central District of Jask County, Hormozgan Province, Iran. At the 2006 census, its population was 73, in 19 families.
