= Kampong Soam Municipality =

Kampong Soam Municipality ក្រុងកំពង់សោម
- Municipality
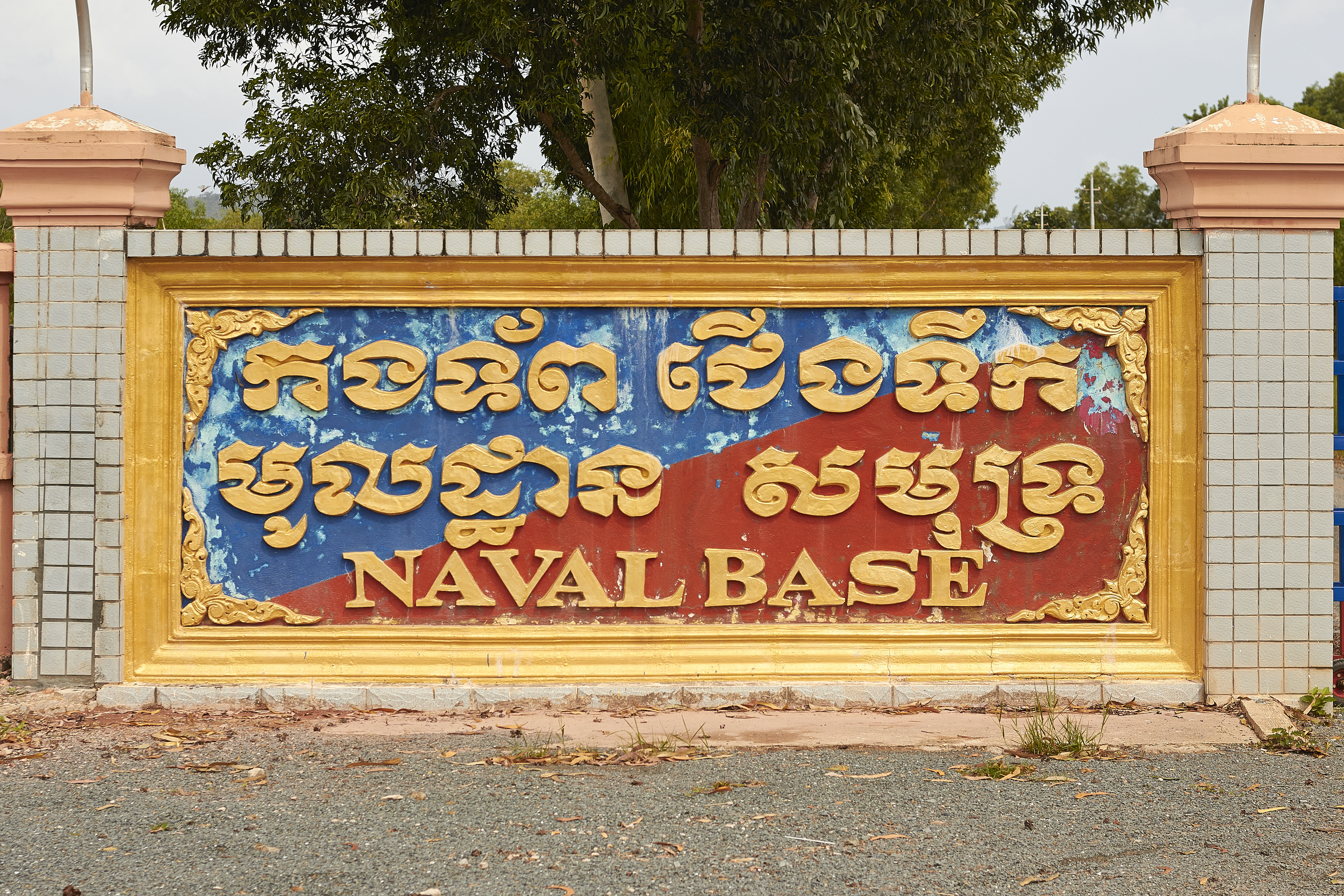

- Location in Cambodia
- Coordinates: 10°33′54″N 103°39′18″E
- Country: Cambodia
- Province: Preah Sihanouk
- Sangkats: 5
- Villages: 23

Government
  - Type: City municipality

Population (2019)
  - Total: 38,254
- Time zone: UTC+7 (ICT)
- District Code: 1806

Kampong Soam Municipality (Khmer: ក្រុងកំពង់សោម) is a municipality (krong) in Preah Sihanouk Province, Cambodia. Established in August 2024, it is the third city in the province, alongside Sihanoukville and Koh Rong. Kampong Som was the initial name for the coastal city that was later known as Sihanoukville during the Sangkum Reastr Niyum period. The name was changed back to Kampong Som following Marshall Lon Nol's coup, and in 1993, it was changed again to Sihanoukville when the contemporary Cambodian state was established.

== History ==
The municipality was created by a Royal Government sub-decree signed by Prime Minister Hun Manet on August 28, 2024. The creation of the city involved the partition of five communes from Prey Nob District.

== Geography ==
Kampong Som is located in the southern part of Preah Sihanouk Province. It serves as a strategic gateway for the province, housing the Sihanouk International Airport and portions of the Ream Naval Base coastal area.

== Administrative divisions ==
As of 2026, Kampong Soam Municipality has five sangkats (quarters) and 23 villages. The city hall and administrative headquarters are located in Sangkat Ream.

| No. | Code | Sangkat | Khmer | Number of villages |
|---|---|---|---|---|
| 1 | 180601 | Ream | រាម | 4 |
| 2 | 180602 | Bet Trang | បិតត្រាង | 3 |
| 3 | 180603 | Ou Oknha Heng | អូរឧកញ៉ាហេង | 5 |
| 4 | 180604 | Boeng Ta Prum | បឹងតាព្រហ្ម | 6 |
| 5 | 180605 | Ou Chrov | អូរជ្រៅ | 5 |

== Economy and Infrastructure ==
The city is designated as a key component of the "Multi-Purpose Model Special Economic Zone" master plan. It includes:

Sihanouk International Airport: Located within the city limits.

Investment Zones: The area is a hub for new special economic zones (SEZs) and high-end tourism development projects.

Transportation: The city is bisected by National Road 4 and is near the Phnom Penh-Sihanoukville Expressway.

== Government ==
The city is governed by a Municipal Council and a Board of Governors. Following its creation in 2024, the administration transitioned from the Prey Nob District authorities to a dedicated municipal structure to improve public service delivery and urban planning. The first municipal council election of Kampong Som Municipality was held on January 26, 2025.
