= Bareshkan =

Bareshkan بارشكان
- Village
- Location within Iran
- Coordinates: 26°28′00″N 57°55′00″E
- Country: Iran
- Province: Hormozgan
- County: Jask
- Bakhsh: Central
- Rural District: Jask

Population (2006)
  - Total: 53
- Time zone: UTC+3:30 (IRST)
  - Summer (DST): UTC+4:30 (IRDT)

Bareshkan (Persian: بارشكان, also Romanized as Bāreshkān) is a village in Jask Rural District, in the Central District of Jask County, Hormozgan Province, Iran. At the 2006 census, its population was 53, in 15 families.
