= Lafik =

Lafik لافيك
- Village
- Location within Iran
- Coordinates: 25°46′18″N 57°45′04″E
- Country: Iran
- Province: Hormozgan
- County: Jask
- Bakhsh: Central
- Rural District: Jask

Population (2006)
  - Total: 221
- Time zone: UTC+3:30 (IRST)
  - Summer (DST): UTC+4:30 (IRDT)

Lafik (Persian: لافيك, also Romanized as Lāfīk; also known as Lāfīnk and Lāpink) is a village in Jask Rural District, in the Central District of Jask County, Hormozgan Province, Iran. At the 2006 census, its population was 221, in 38 families.
