= Kuek =

Kuek may refer to:

- Kuek, Iran, a village
- Kuek, South Kordofan, a village
- Kuek, a subgroup of the Atuot people of South Sudan

People with the surname Kuek include:

- Desmond Kuek (born 1967), Singaporean business executive and former general
- Ani Lorak (born Karolina Kuek, 1978), Ukrainian entertainer
