= Sihanoukville (disambiguation) =

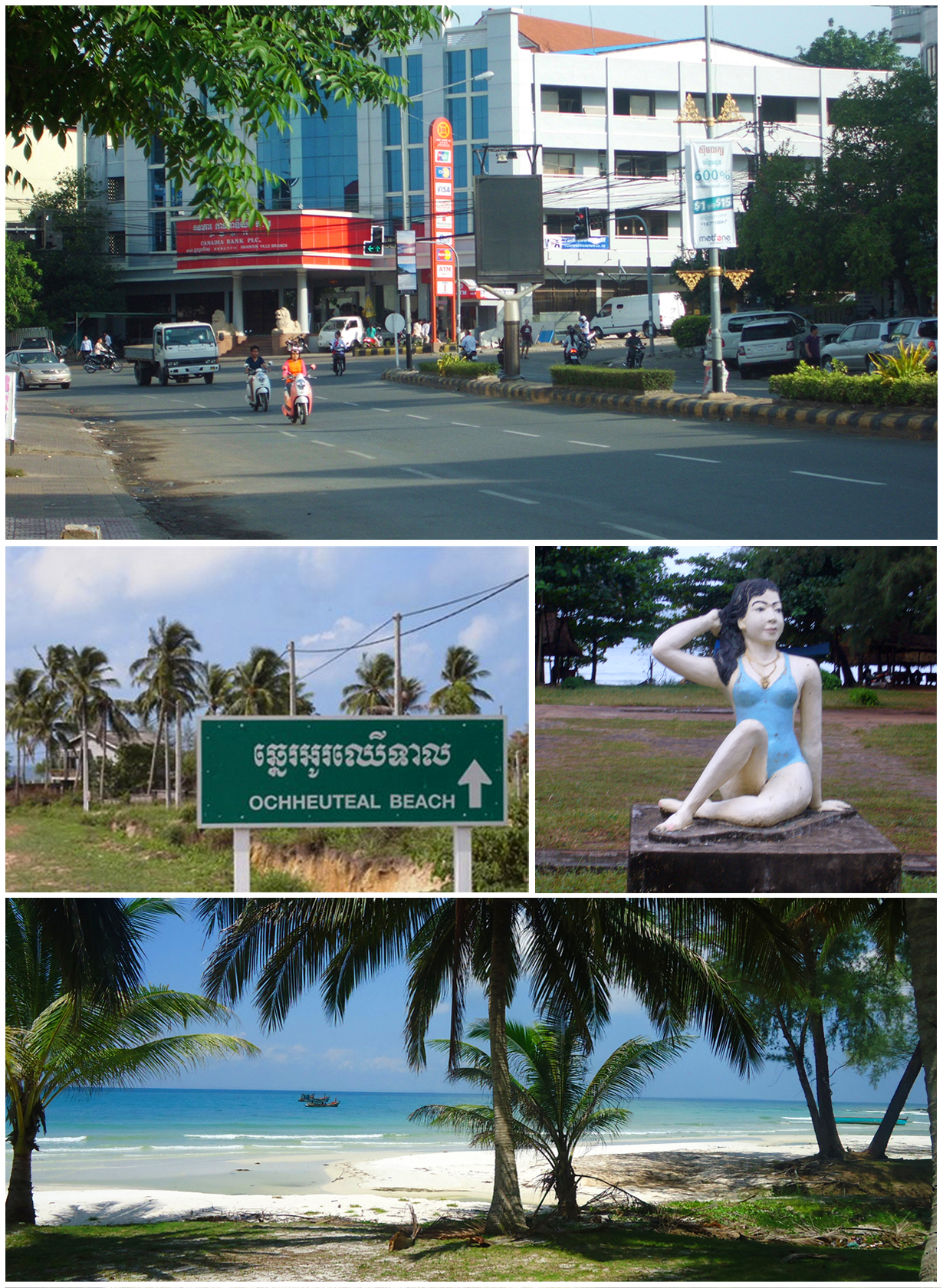
Sihanoukville City image montage

Sihanoukville is a coastal city in Cambodia and the capital of Preah Sihanouk Province.

Sihanoukville may refer to:

- Sihanoukville Province, Cambodia
  - Sihanoukville Autonomous Port
  - Sihanoukville Municipality
  - Sihanoukville International Airport

== See also ==
- Sihanouk
