= Techo Sen Russey Treb Cambodian Royal Academy Park =

Park in Cambodia

- Location within Cambodia
- Location: Chhaeb District, Preah Vihear province, Cambodia
- Coordinates: 13.84678°N 105.43356°E
- Area: 11,435 ha (114.35 km^{2})
- Established: 8 April 2014
- Governing body: Royal Academy of Cambodia

Techo Sen Russey Treb Cambodian Royal Academy Park is a protected area in northern Cambodia, in Chhaeb District of Preah Vihear province. It was established in 2014 and covers 11,435 ha (114.35 km^{2}).

== Geography and features ==
The park is located in Chhaeb Lech and Chhaeb Kert communes in Chhaeb District, Preah Vihear province.

The establishing royal decree identifies the area as having archaeological, historical, cultural and natural characteristics, with stated aims that include supporting archaeological studies and research and protecting national heritage, the environment and natural resources.

Cultural heritage in the park includes clusters of archaeological iron-smelting sites at Trapang Treb and Trapang Russey Treb, with dozens of documented smelting locations and associated ponds. Archaeological remains documented at the sites include items such as air tubes for iron forges, furnace structures and slag mounds, and the area's heritage has been associated with the history of the Kouy Indigenous communities in northern Cambodia.

The park's management has recorded more than 100 bird species, and management activities have included ranger patrols and the construction of dry-season water basins intended to support wildlife access to water. A tree-nursery and replanting programme began in late 2017, with a target of planting 1 million trees over six years. Local livelihoods associated with the surrounding forest landscape include collection of non-timber forest products such as resin, vines and mushrooms.

== History ==
Techo Sen Russey Treb Cambodian Royal Academy Park was established on 8 April 2014 by Royal Decree No. 436.

In February 2025, Cambodia's Ministry of Environment and the Royal Academy of Cambodia signed an agreement on cooperation for protection and management of the park, with officials citing issues including encroachment, illegal logging and forest fires.
