= Taing Kouk District =

Taing Kouk District ស្រុកតាំងគោក
- District
- Location in Cambodia
- Coordinates: 12°16′21″N 105°7′28″E
- Country: Cambodia
- Province: Kampong Thom
- Communes: 8
- Villages: 91
- Established: 8 January 2019

Population (2019)
  - Total: 64,888
- Time zone: UTC+7 (ICT)
- District Code: 0609

Taing Kouk District (Khmer: ស្រុកតាំងគោក) is a district located in Kampong Thom Province, in central Cambodia. The district was officially established in January 2019 by carving out eight communes from neighboring Baray District. The administrative seat and district hall are located in Sou Young Commune.

== History ==
Taing Kouk was created under Sub-decree No. 05, signed by Prime Minister Hun Sen on 8 January 2019. The separation from Baray District was implemented to improve local administrative efficiency and public service delivery for the growing local population.

== Geography ==
The district covers a total area of 505.9 square kilometers. It is located in the southern portion of Kampong Thom Province and is divided by National Road 6, a major economic artery connecting the national capital Phnom Penh with Siem Reap. The local landscape consists primarily of low-lying, fertile agricultural plains characteristic of the central Cambodian basin.

== Administrative divisions ==
Taing Kouk District has eight khums (communes) and 91 villages. The administrative headquarter is located in Sou Young Commune.

No.	Code	Commune	Khmer	Number of villages
1	060901	Pongro	ពង្រ	7
2	060902	Chraneang	ច្រនាង	13
3	060903	Chrolong	ជ្រលង	9
4	060904	Triel	ទ្រៀល	22
5	060905	Sou Young	សូយោង	11
6	060906	Sralau	ស្រឡៅ	15
7	060907	Svay Phleung	ស្វាយភ្លើង	7
8	0609058	Andoung Pou	អណ្ដូងពោធិ៍	7

== Economy ==
The district's economy is predominantly agricultural, with the vast majority of households relying on rice cultivation, subsistence farming, and fishery. Its strategic placement along National Road 6 also supports localized retail commerce, market trade, and transport services.
