= Jask-e Kohneh =

Village in Hormozgan province, Iran

Jask-e Kohneh Persian: جاسك كهنه
- Village
- Location within Iran
- Coordinates: 25°44′26″N 57°46′21″E
- Country: Iran
- Province: Hormozgan
- County: Jask
- District: Central
- Rural District: Jask

Population (2016)
  - Total: 1,202
- Time zone: UTC+3:30 (IRST)

Jask-e Kohneh (Persian: جاسك كهنه) (Note: Also romanized as Jāsk-e Kohneh; also known as Juna) is a village in, and the capital of, Jask Rural District of the Central District of Jask County, Hormozgan province, Iran.

== Demographics ==
=== Population ===
At the time of the 2006 National Census, the village's population was 899 in 200 households. The following census in 2011 counted 1,309 people in 223 households. The 2016 census measured the population of the village as 1,202 people in 288 households.
