= Baray district =

Baray បារាយណ៍
- District
- Baray District ស្រុកបារាយណ៍
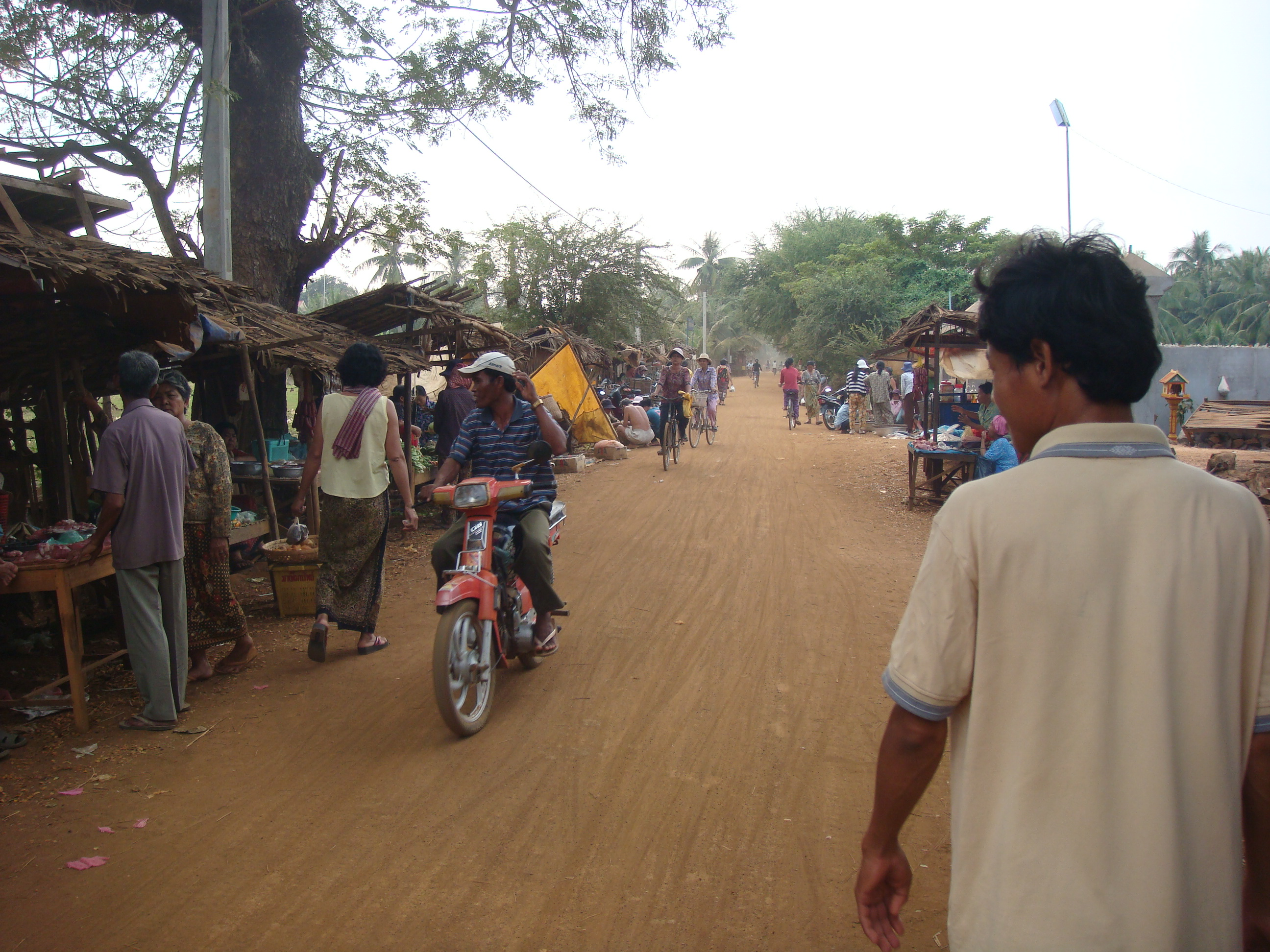
- Street in Baray village

- Location in Cambodia
- Coordinates: 12°23′23″N 105°04′46″E
- Country: Cambodia
- Province: Kampong Thom
- Communes: 10
- Villages: 97

Population (2008)
  - Total: 167,581
- Time zone: UTC+07:00 (ICT)
- Geocode: 0601

Baray District (Khmer: ស្រុកបារាយណ៍ ភូមិក្ដាមហា) is a district within Kampong Thom province, in central Cambodia.

== Administration ==
According to the 1998 census of Cambodia, the Baray District consisted of 18 communes and had a population of 159,586. The population recorded by the 2008 census was 167,581.

In January 2019 eight of the 18 communes—Andoung Pou, Chranieng, Chrolong, Pongro, Sou Young, Sralau, Svay Phleung and Treal—were split from the district to form the Taing Kouk district.

As of 2020, the district contains the following communes.

Code	Commune	Khmer
060101	Bak Sna	ឃុំបាក់ស្នា
060102	Ballangk	ឃុំបល្ល័ង្គ
060103	Baray	ឃុំបារាយណ៍
060104	Boeng	ឃុំបឹង
060105	Chaeung Daeung	ឃុំចើងដើងសី
060107	Chhuk Khsach	ឃុំឈូកខ្សាច់
060108	Chong Doung	ឃុំចុងដូង
060110	Kokir Thum	ឃុំគគីធំ
060111	Krava	ឃុំក្រវ៉ា
060117	Tnaot Chum	ឃុំត្នោតជុំ

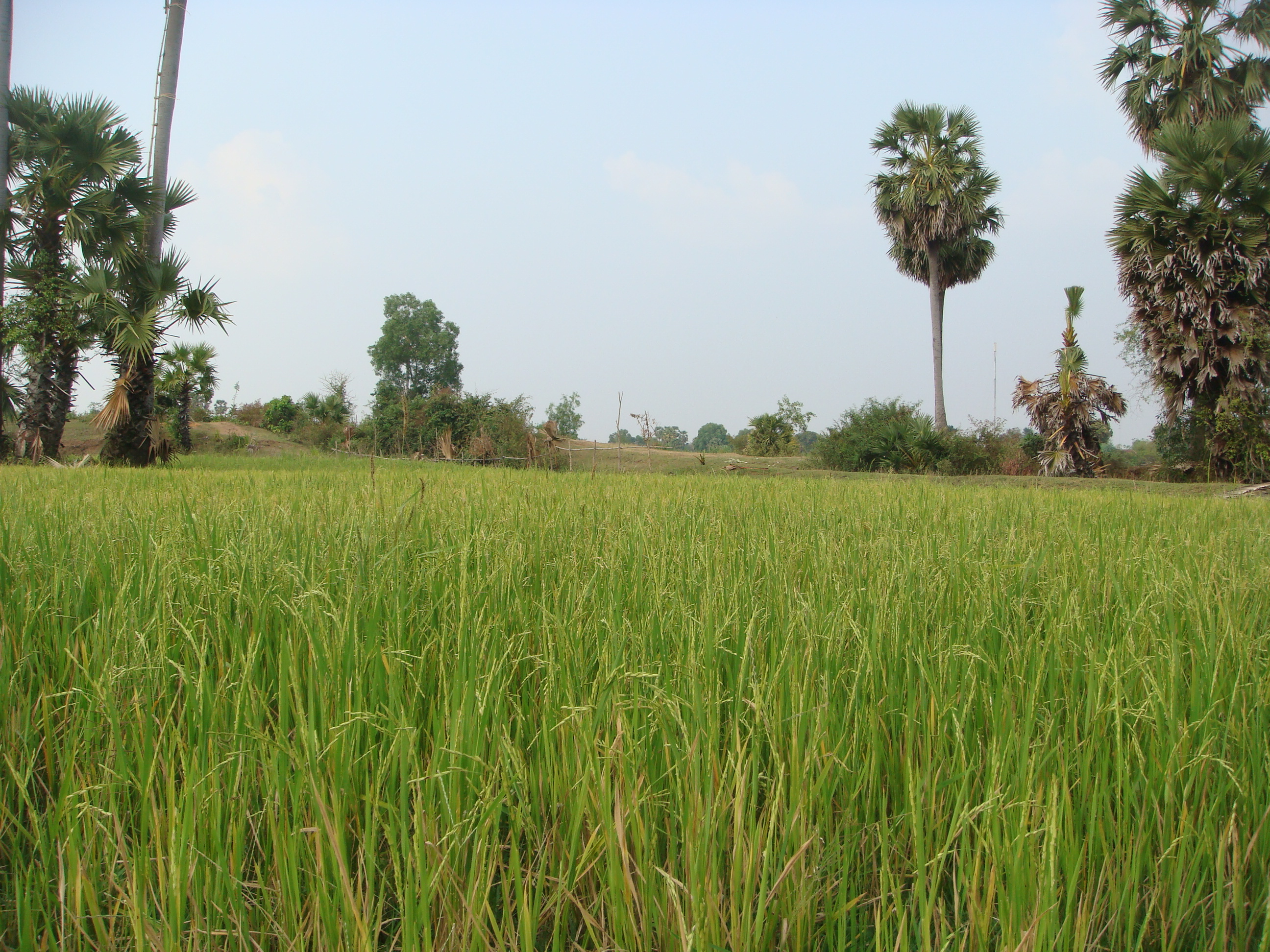
Rice paddies, Baray
