= Kampong Seila District =

Kampong Seila District ស្រុកកំពង់សីលា
- District
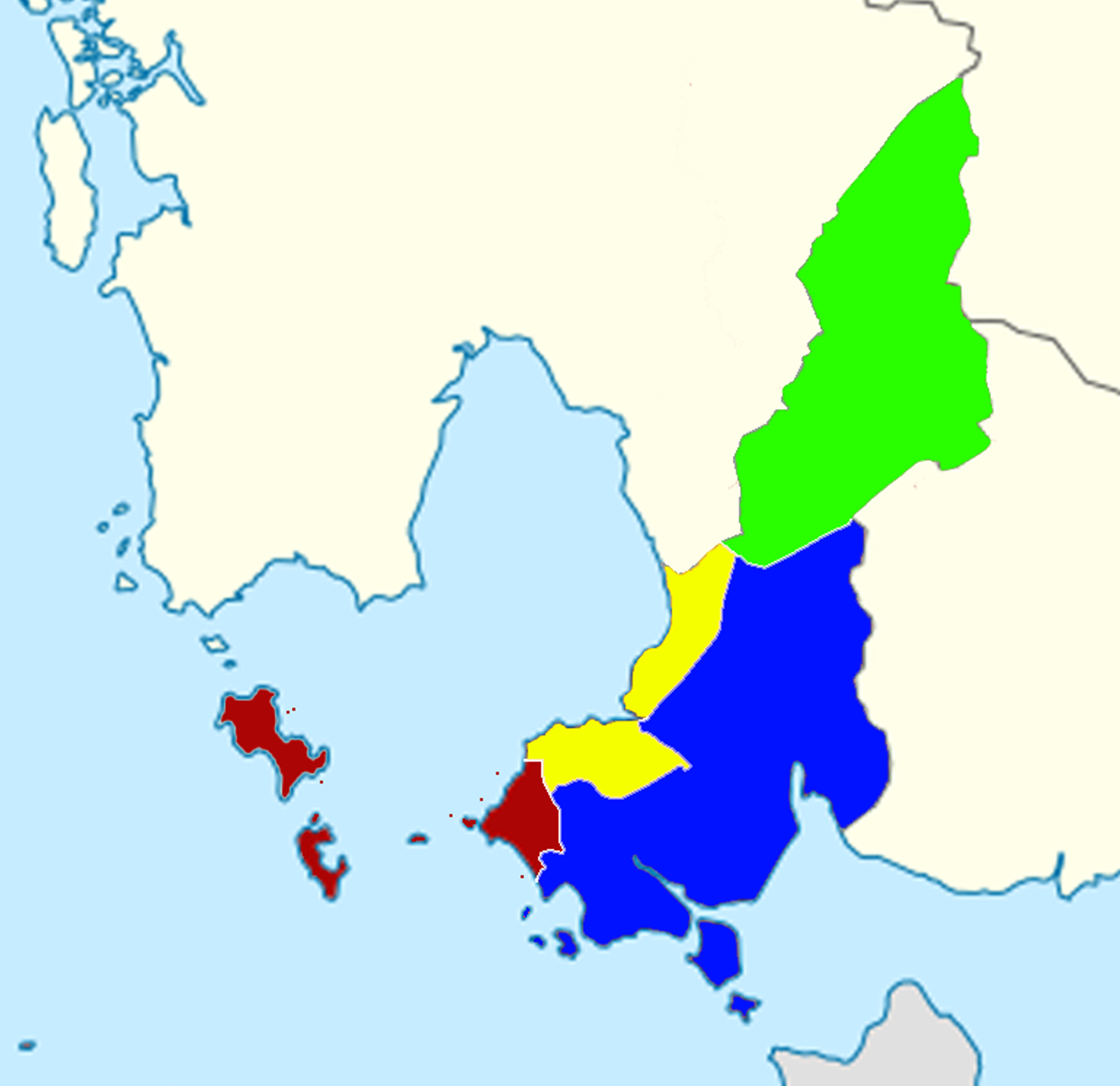
- Sihanoukville Province districts: Sihanoukville Municipality (red), Stueng Hav (yellow), Prey Nob (blue), Kampong Seila (green)
- Country: Cambodia
- Province: Sihanoukville
- Communes: 4
- Villages: 14

Population (2008)
  - Total: 14,965
- Time zone: UTC+7 (ICT)
- Geocode: 1804

Kampong Seila District (Khmer: ស្រុកកំពង់សីលា) is a district (srok) in southwestern Cambodia, which formerly belonged to Koh Kong province. In January 2009, King Norodom Sihamoni incorporated the district into Sihanoukville province per royal decree, which states: "The administrative boundaries of Sihanoukville municipality and Koh Kong province shall be adjusted by sub-dividing land from Kampong Seila district in whole and partial land of Sre Ambel district in Koh Kong province to Sihanoukville municipality." Officials were assigned to create a "national workshop" process all necessary administrative tasks. The National Institute of Statistics of Cambodia refers in its most recent and preliminary studies to a successful integration of the district, including maps, although concluding statistics and numbers are expected to be available with the next full report. Sihanoukville province's new official domain already runs administration of Kampong Seila district.

== Geography ==
The district's northern part encompasses Kirirom National Park and to the east it constitutes the southwest promontory of Preah Monivong National Park of the Elephant Mountains. The Elephant Mountain range of uplifted Mesozoic substrates is an important watershed for the large Tonle Sap system in central Cambodia. The intact habitat is subject to concerted maintenance of five major protected areas.

Throughout the diamond-shaped province rolling hills are predominant and the area flattens towards the south where it almost touches the sea. For nearly its entire length the National Highway 4 (Cambodia) loops through the district from north to south.

== Settlements ==
Kampong Seila consists of four communes (Sangkat), which are divided into 14 villages (phum). The district's capital is called Kompong Seila, which is in turn the center of Kampong Seila's capital commune. Its distance from Phnom Penh is roughly 135 km and from Sihanoukville (city) around 85 km.

Markets, pagodas, and administrative units are centered on the vital National Road 4. Kompong Seila's overwhelmingly rural population engages in rice farming, forestry, and subsidiary crop cultivation, such as gourds and cucumbers.

== Demographics and education ==
In the village seat of the district there are 1400 people and about 280 households. The main school is the T.C. Kampong Seila school.

Kampong Seila District
Khum (Commune)	Phum (Villages)
Chamkar Luong	Chamkar Luong, Boeng Trach, Samdech Ta
Kampong Seila	Cham Srei, Krang at, Thmei, Veal
Ou Bak Roteh	Prey Praseth, Stueng Chral, Stueng Samraong
Stueng Chhay	Kirivoan, Ou Ta Hay, Stueng Chhay Khang Tbong, Stueng Chhay Khang Cheung

== Agriculture ==
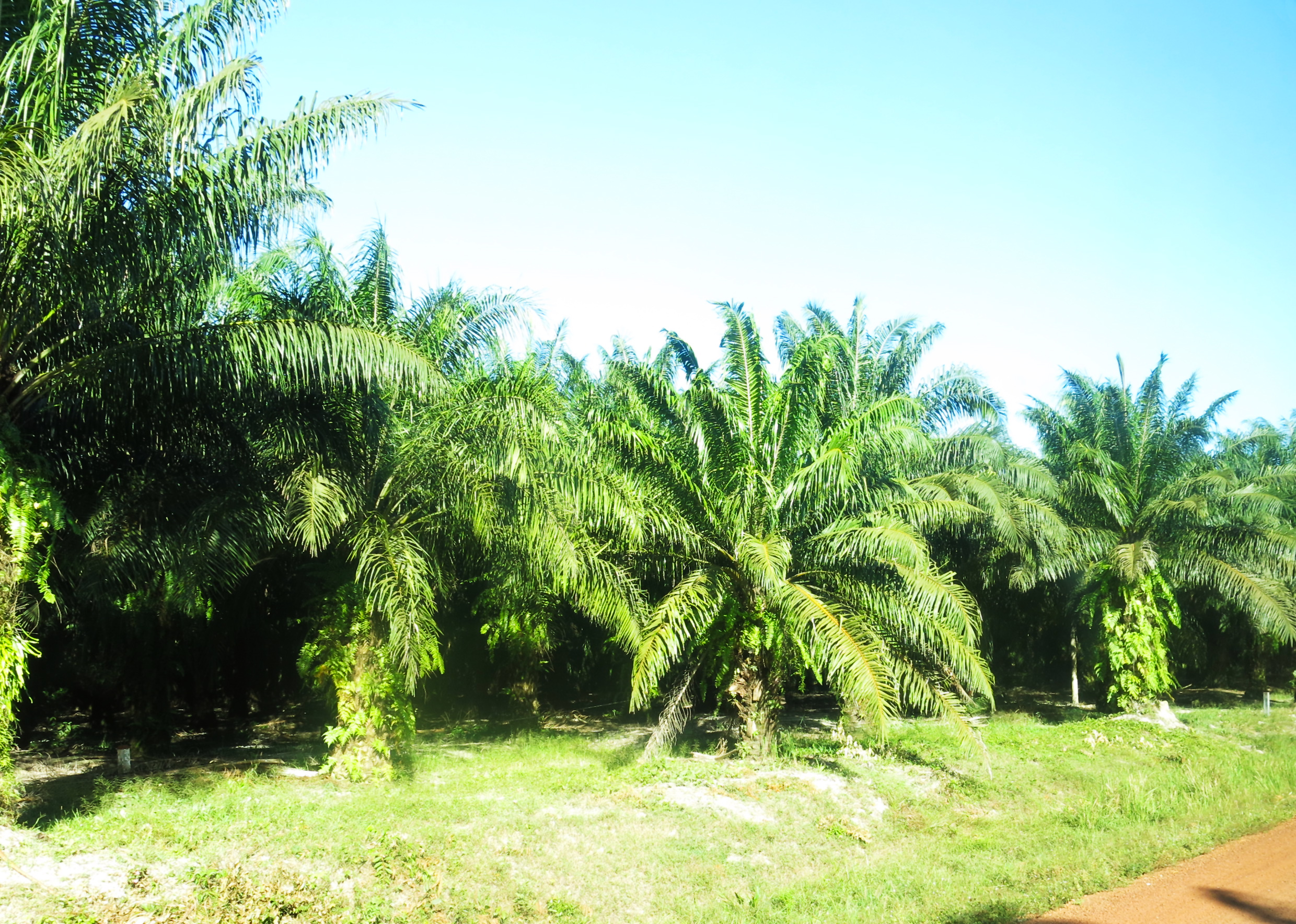
Palm oil plantation in Kampong Seila District, Cambodia, December 2015

Southeast Asia's fourth largest palm oil producer, MRICOP, planted oil palm trees on 477 ha in Kampong Seila. While MRICOP frequently highlights economic advantages, others are concerned about the negative impact of monocultures on the local eco-system, dubious land concession practices, and demographic irritations.

== See also ==
- Dâmrei Mountains
