= Ou Krieng Saenchey District =

Ou Krieng Saenchey District ស្រុកអូរគ្រៀងសែនជ័យ
- Municipality
- Location in Cambodia
- Coordinates: 13°2′23″N 106°10′59″E
- Country: Cambodia
- Province: Kratie
- Communes: 5
- Villages: 25

Population (2019)
  - Total: 32,037
- Time zone: UTC+7 (ICT)
- District Code: 1007

Ou Krieng Saenchey District (Khmer: ស្រុកអូរគ្រៀងសែនជ័យ) is a district (srok) in Kratie Province, Cambodia. Established in late 2022, it is the seventh district in the province.

== History ==
The district was officially created by Sub-decree No. 270 on December 23, 2022. The decision was made to improve administrative efficiency in the remote northern parts of the province. To form the new district, five communes were carved out of Sambour District.

== Geography ==
Ou Krieng Saenchey is a rural district heavily characterized by its proximity to the Mekong River and the protected forest areas of northeastern Cambodia. It borders the Stung Treng Province to the north.

== Administrative divisions ==
As of 2026, Ou Krieng Saenchey District has five khums (communes) and 25 villages. The administrative headquarter is located in Ou Krieng Commune.

No.	Code	Commune	Khmer	Number of villages
1	100701	Kbal Damrei	ក្បាលដំរី	5
2	100702	Ou Krieng	អូរគ្រៀង	5
3	100703	Oukondear Senchey	អូរកណ្តៀរសែនជ័យ	3
4	100704	Roluos Mean Chey	រលួសមានជ័យ	6
5	100705	Srae Chis	ស្រែជិះ	6

== Economy ==
The economy is primarily agricultural, with a focus on:

Small-scale farming: Rice, corn, and pulse crops.

Agro-industry: The area has seen a rise in rubber and cashew nut plantations.

Natural Resources: Due to its location, the district plays a role in forest conservation and community-based fishery management along the Mekong.
