= Sangkum Thmei district =

Sangkum Thmei ស្រុកសង្គមថ្មី
- District (srok)
- Location in Cambodia
- Coordinates: 13°28′26″N 104°46′14″E
- Country: Cambodia
- Province: Preah Vihear
- Communes: 5
- Villages: 24
- Time zone: +7
- Geocode: 1306

Sangkum Thmei (Khmer: ស្រុកសង្គមថ្មី) is a district located in Preah Vihear province, in northern Cambodia. According to the 1998 census of Cambodia, it had a population of 13,773.

== Administration ==
The following table shows the villages of Sangkum Thmei district by commune.

Khum (communes)	Phum (villages)
Chamraeun	Pratheat, Tbaeng, Da, Saen Kong, Srei Sranaoh
Ro'ang	Andoung Phlu, Khnar, Stueng, Kdei, Boeng, Knor
Phnum Tbaeng Muoy	Samlanh, Kbal Khla
Sdau	Ta Bas, Sdau, Soch, Trapeang Thlok, Trapeang Khchaeng
Ronak Ser	Ta Saeng Kandal, Ta Saeng Khang Cheung, Trapeang Reang, Svay, koukThkov, Rolum Slaeng
