= Tbaeng Meanchey District =

Tbaeng Meanchey ត្បែងមានជ័យ
- District (srok)
- Location in Cambodia
- Coordinates: 13.8609°N 105.0216°E
- Country: Cambodia
- Province: Preah Vihear
- Communes: 4
- Villages: 12

Population (2008)
  - Total: 9,518
- Time zone: +7
- Geocode: 1307

Tbaeng Meanchey District (ត្បែងមានជ័យ, lit. 'Victorious Tbaeng Tree') is a district located in Preah Vihear Province, in northern Cambodia. According to the 1998 census of Cambodia, it consisted of six communes and had a population of 21,580. In 2008–2009, two communes—Kampong Pranak and Pal Hal—formed a new district, the Preah Vihear Municipality; according to the 2008 census, the population of the resulting four-commune district was 9,518.

The following table shows the communes in the district as of 2020.

Code	Commune	Khmer
130703	Chhean Mukh	ឃុំឈានមុខ
130704	Pou	ឃុំពោធិ៍
130705	Prame	ឃុំប្រមេរុ
130706	Preah Khleang	ឃុំព្រះឃ្លាំង
