= Koveyk =

Koveyk كويك
- Village
- Location within Iran
- Coordinates: 25°47′37″N 57°46′39″E
- Country: Iran
- Province: Hormozgan
- County: Jask
- Bakhsh: Central
- Rural District: Jask

Population (2006)
  - Total: 579
- Time zone: UTC+3:30 (IRST)
  - Summer (DST): UTC+4:30 (IRDT)

Koveyk (Persian: كويك; also known as Gū’īk, Kavā‘īk, Kawaik, Kūek, and Kwaik) is a village in Jask Rural District, in the Central District of Jask County, Hormozgan Province, Iran. At the 2006 census, its population was 579, in 120 families.
