= Chey Saen District =

Chey Saen ជ័យសែន
- District (srok)
- Location in Cambodia
- Coordinates: 13°34′56″N 105°20′43″E
- Country: Cambodia
- Province: Preah Vihear
- Communes: 6
- Villages: 21

Population (2008)
  - Total: 20,730
- Time zone: +7
- Geocode: 1301

Chey Saen District (Khmer: ស្រុកជ័យសែន) is a district located in Preah Vihear Province, in northern Cambodia. According to the 1998 census of Cambodia, it had a population of 15,004. The population recorded by the 2008 census was 20,730.

== Administration ==
As of 2020, the district contains the following khums (communes).

Code	Commune	Khmer
130101	S'ang	ឃុំស្អាង
130102	Tasu	ឃុំតស៊ូ
130103	Khyang	ឃុំខ្យង
130104	Chrach	ឃុំច្រាច់
130105	Thmea	ឃុំធ្មា
130106	Putrea	ឃុំពុទ្រា
