= Chhaeb District =

Chhaeb ឆែប
- District (srok)
- Location in Cambodia
- Coordinates: 13°54′39″N 105°27′42″E
- Country: Cambodia
- Province: Preah Vihear
- Communes: 8
- Villages: 26

Population (2008)
  - Total: 16,731
- Time zone: +7
- Geocode: 1302

Chhaeb District (Khmer: ឆែប) is a district located in Preah Vihear Province, in northern Cambodia. According to the 1998 census of Cambodia, it had a population of 12,450. The population recorded by the 2008 census was 16,731. The district includes Techo Sen Russey Treb Cambodian Royal Academy Park, a 11,435 ha (114.35 km^{2}) protected area established in 2014.

== Administration ==
As of 2020, the district contains the following khums (communes).

Code	Commune	Khmer
130201	Chhaeb Muoy	ឃុំឆែបមួយ
130202	Chhaeb Pir	ឃុំឆែបពីរ
130203	Sangkae Muoy	ឃុំសង្កែមួយ
130204	Sangkae Pir	ឃុំសង្កែពីរ
130205	Mlu Prey Muoy	ឃុំម្លូព្រៃមួយ
130206	Mlu Prey Pir	ឃុំម្លូព្រៃពីរ
130207	Kampong Sralau Muoy	ឃុំកំពង់ស្រឡៅមួយ
130208	Kampong Sralau Pir	ឃុំកំពង់ស្រឡៅពីរ
