= Choam Khsant District =

Choam Khsant
- District (srok)
- Location in Cambodia
- Coordinates: 14°10′N 104°55′E
- Country: Cambodia
- Province: Preah Vihear

Population (2008)
  - Total: 25,245
- Time zone: +7
- Geocode: 1303

Choam Khsant District (ស្រុកជាំក្សាន្ត) is a district in the Preah Vihear Province in northern Cambodia. The district capital is Choam Khsant (ឃុំជាំក្សាន្ដ), which is also part of a commune-level division of Cambodia. Preah Vihear is in this district. According to the 1998 census, it had a population of 16,073, and in 2008 had an estimated population of 25, 245 people.
