= Kuleaen District =

Kuleaen គូលែន
- District (srok)
- Location in Cambodia
- Coordinates: 13°47′09″N 104°36′38″E
- Country: Cambodia
- Province: Preah Vihear
- Communes: 6
- Villages: 23

Population (2008)
  - Total: 24,824
- Time zone: +7
- Geocode: 1304

Kuleaen District is a district located in Preah Vihear Province, in northern Cambodia. According to the 1998 census of Cambodia, it had a population of 13,829. The population recorded by the 2008 census was 24,824.

== Administration ==
The following table shows the villages of Kuleaen district by commune.

Khum (Communes)	Phum (Villages)
Kuleaen Tboung	Kuleaen Tboung, Krabau
Kuleaen Cheung	Kuleaen Cheung, Pyuor Chruk
Thmei	Thnal Baek, Trav Kiet, Pongro, Dan, Damnak Kantuot
Phnum Penh	Pnov, Bos, Srabal
Phnum Tbaeng Pir	Chhuk, Sralay, Baribour, Kdak
Srayang	Srayang Cheung, Srayang Tboung, Kaoh Ker, Mrech, Rumchek, Sambour, Sna Pa'ek
