= Preah Khan Kompong Svay =

Angkorian archeological complex in Cambodia

Coordinates: 13°11′33″N 104°54′03″E

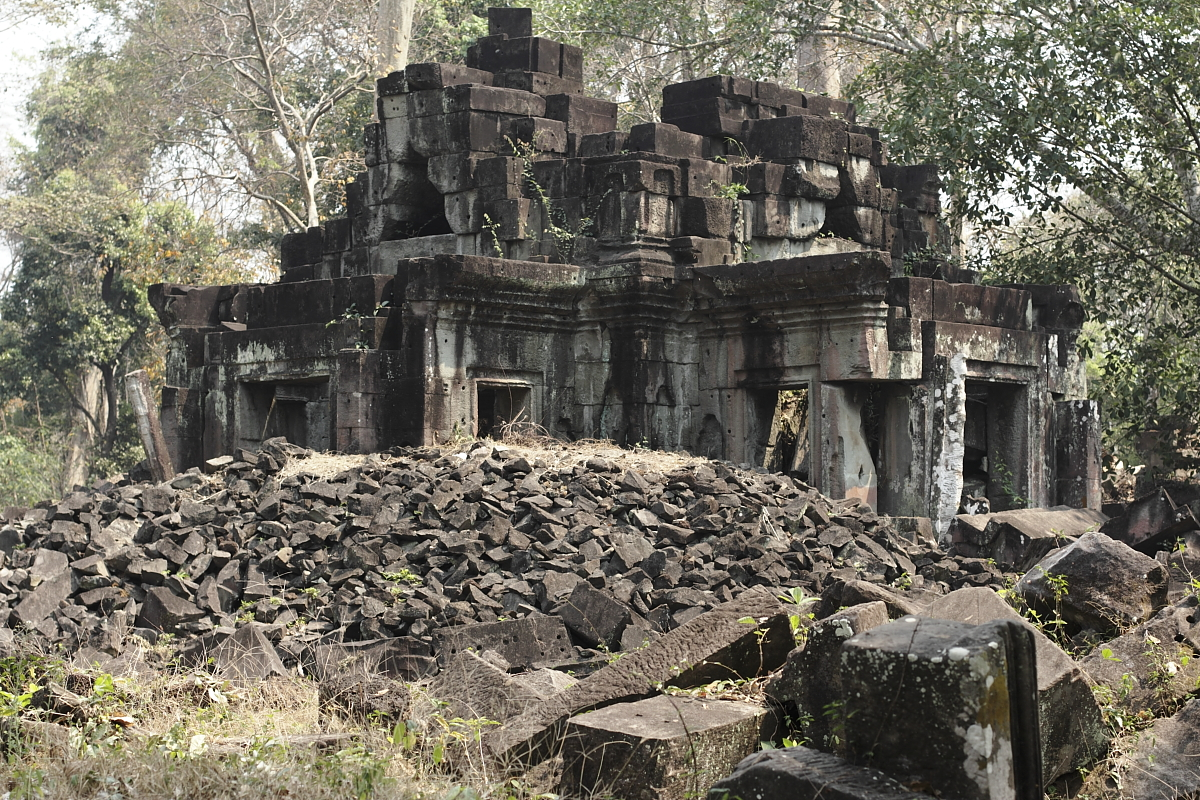
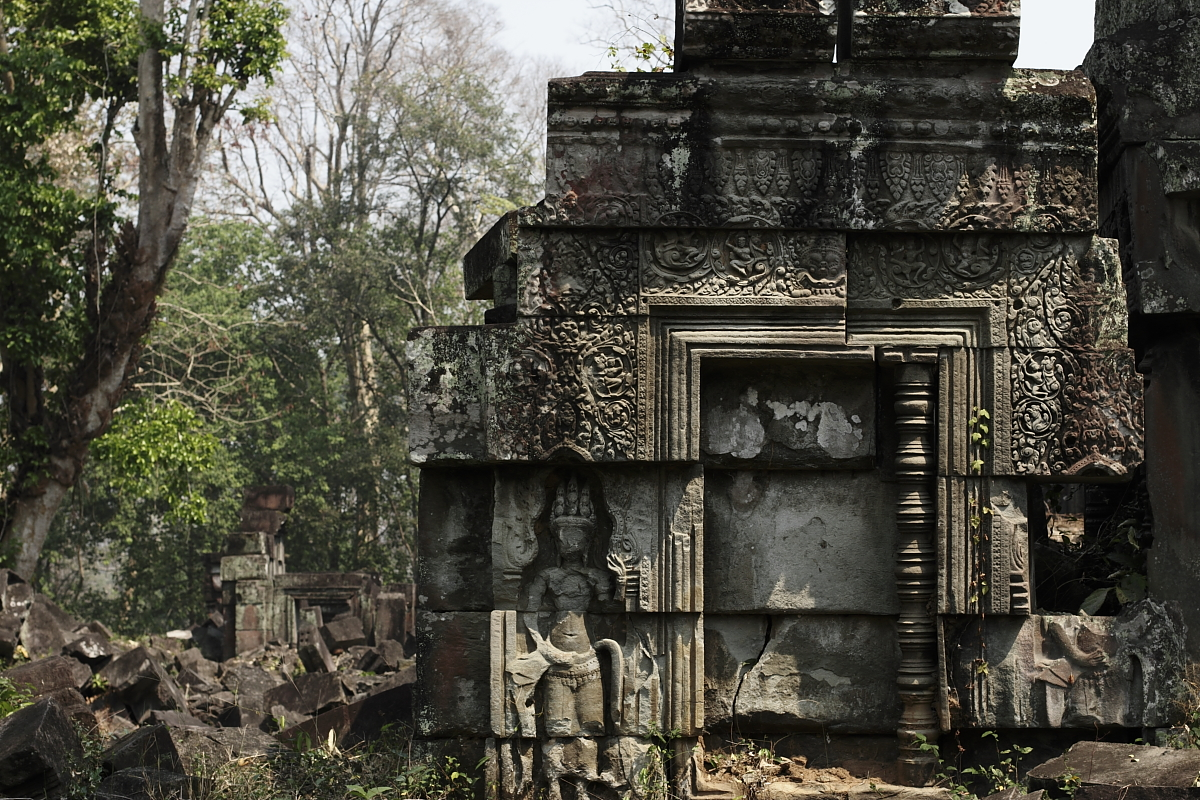
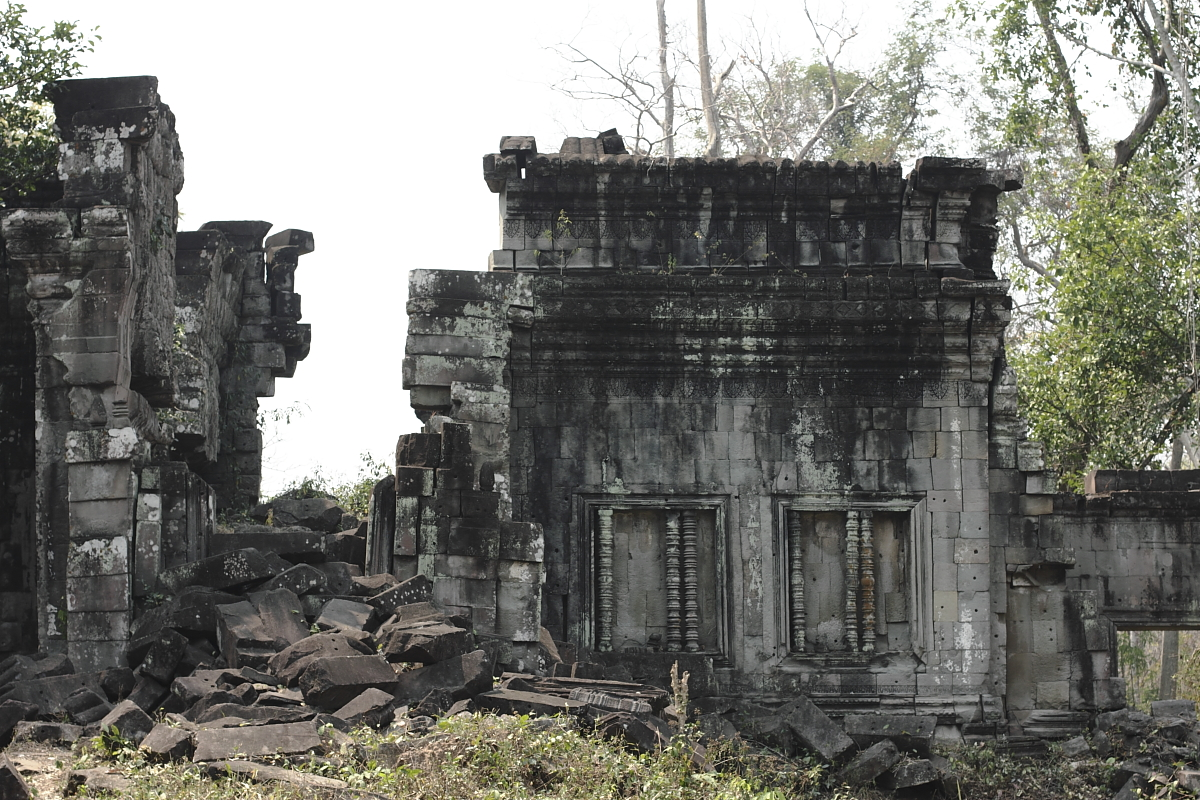
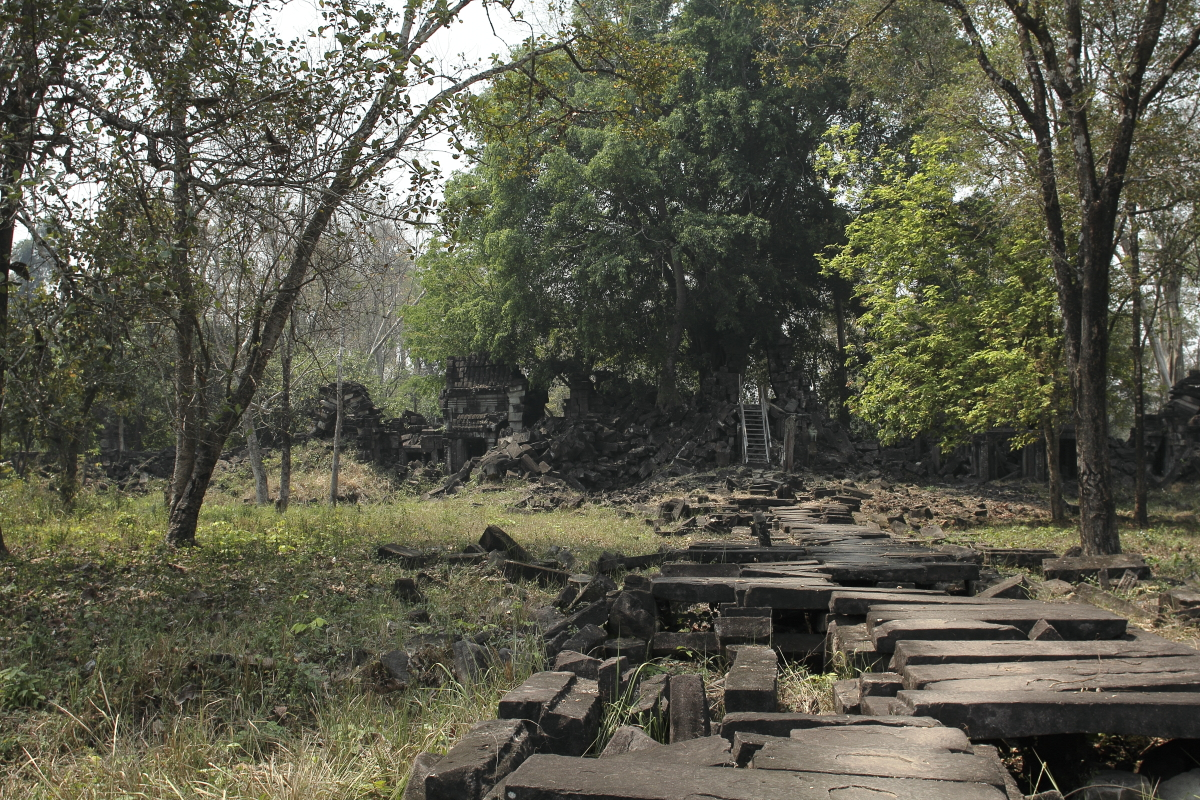
Temple ruins of Preah Khan Kompong Svay

The archeological complex of Preah Khan Kampong Svay (Khmer: ព្រះខ័ននៅកំពង់ស្វាយ), also known as Prasat Bakan (according to local pronunciation), or Bakan Svay Rolay, is located 100 km east of Angkor, in the Preah Vihear province of Cambodia. It stands as the largest single religious complex ever built during the Angkorian Era, as its exterior enclosure is over 22 km square, even if the isolated location makes it one of the less-visited Angkorian sites.

== History ==
There is little historical data about Preah Khan Kompong Svay. Some French scholars have argued that it was founded in the 11th century, probably by Suryavarman I. Evidence from sediment analysis suggests that the site was fully abandoned during the late 14th to 15th century, with maintenance of temples and infrastructure ceasing around the mid-14th century. The complex is notable for its use as a royal residence during the kingdom of Suryavarman II and as a military outpost for Jayavarman VII during conflicts with the Cham in the late 12th century.

Some of the theories mentioned by Mitch Hendrickson and Damian Evans about what Preah Khan Kompong Svay actually was include a kingdom of the Khmer, its own entity, a trading outpost, and a defensive center.

=== Rediscovery ===
In 1873, the explorer Louis Delaporte visited the complex and studied its ruins. With the agreement of the king of Cambodia, he sent to France examples of reliefs and stone sculptures that were exhibited in the Indochinese Museum of the Trocadéro before being transferred to the collections of the Musée Guimet in 1927. After a number of French missions at the turn of the 19th century, Victor Goloubew in 1937 engaged in aerial surveys that revealed the true extent of the complex.

Many famous Khmer sculptures come from here, such as the putative head of Jayavarman VII that is displayed at the National Museum of Cambodia. The sculptures and carvings of Preah Khan are among the peak works of Khmer art, and the temples have been widely sacked in the past. Thieves have also damaged many structures while looting sculptures and carvings during the second half of the 1990s.

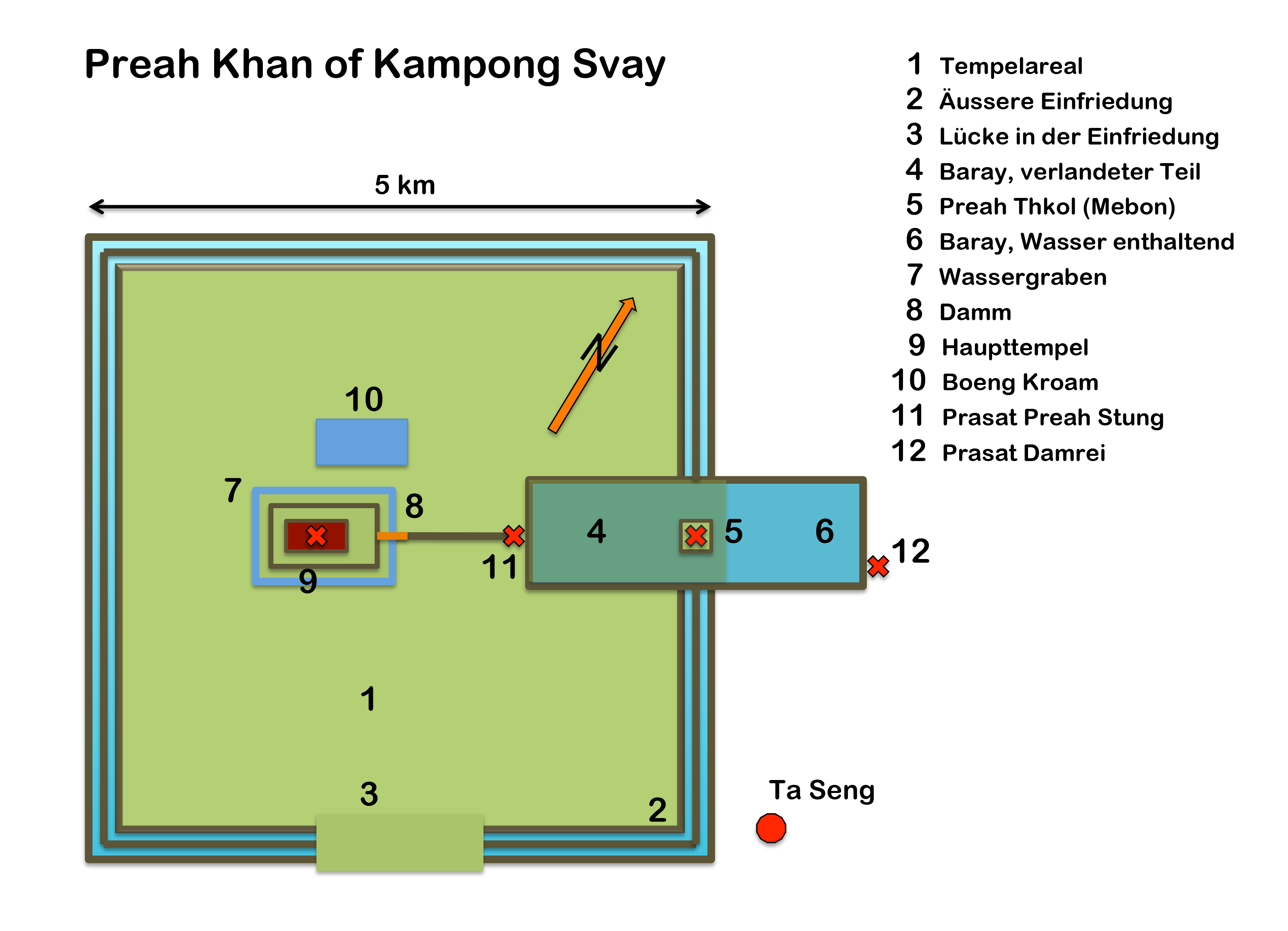
Plan of Preah Khan Kampong Svay temple complex

== Site ==
Preah Khan Kompong Svay covers an area of about 22.5 square kilometers and has four concentric enclosures. Unusually for Khmer sites (which are typically oriented eastward), the temple complex is aligned to the northeast. It was provided with water by a large baray (2.8 km by 750 m, almost completely dry at present), which crosses the eastern side. On an artificial island (mebon) in the middle of the baray, there is Preah Thkol (Khmer: ព្រះថ្កោល), a cruciform temple in sandstone with a standing central tower. In the southeastern corner stands the remains of the 15-meter-high pyramid of Preah Damrei, with laterite enclosure and two stone elephants at its upper corners. The other two elephants are exhibited at the National Museum of Cambodia and the Guimet Museum in Paris.

Inside the exterior enclosure, in the middle of the western side of the baray, there is Prasat Preah Stung (Khmer: ព្រះស្ទឹង), with a peculiar four-faced central tower in Bayon style. This is preceded by a landing stage with nāga balustrades. A laterite causeway leads from here to a centric enclosure, 701 m by 1097 m, surrounded by a moat and endowed with four gopuras similar to Angkor Thom. Near the eastern gopura, there is a dharmasala.

The inner laterite enclosure contains the central sanctuary, standing on a two-tier platform. The central tower collapsed during a looting attempt in 2003. It has entrances in all cardinal directions and is rounded by a windowed gallery.

Revised mapping of the area using various methods, such as ASTER imagery, OrbView imagery, FINNMAP photographs, etc., shows extensive hydraulic structures, masonry religious structures, and concentrations of stoneware, earthware, imported porcelain, and various ceramics that point to 11th–17th-century occupation of the area.

== Iron production ==
Due to its close proximity to iron sources, notably Phnom Dek (the "iron mountain"), the production of iron was thought to be central to Preah Khan's importance. Unlike other Angkorian sites, evidence for iron smelting was even found near temples and within the walled enclosures. However, analysis of slag from these locations has shown that production likely started in the mid-13th century, well after the complex was fully completed, and continued in the periods coinciding with the decline of the Khmer empire. Sediment analysis from the main baray supports a similar timeline. Evidence of widespread burning at the site, possibly for industrial purposes, appears in the mid-14th century, with little evidence for regular burning before that point. This sudden change in use could point to a departure of the Khmer, with the complex being repurposed by local groups.

The iron production techniques of the Kuay people, indigenous to the region, suggest a possible association with the Khmer iron produced in and around Preah Khan. Slag analysis from local furnaces, used until the mid-20th century, and furnaces contemporary to Preah Khan, both used similar smelting recipes. As well as this, both used bamboo for shaping and framing techniques in the construction of their furnaces. However, the two groups were shown to use different sources for their ore.

== World Heritage Status ==
This site was added to the UNESCO World Heritage Tentative List on 27 March 2020 (originally proclaimed 1 September 1992), in the Cultural category.

== Bibliography ==
- Rooney, Dawn F. (2005). Angkor: Cambodia's Wondrous Khmer Temples (5th ed.). Odissey. ISBN 978-962-217-727-7.
- Mauger, Henry (1939). "Práh Khẵn de Kốmpon Svày". BEFEO (in French). 39: 197–220. doi:10.3406/befeo.1939.3722. ISSN 0336-1519.
- Ray, Nick; Robinson, Daniel (2008). Cambodia (6th ed.). Lonely Planet. pp. 262–263. ISBN 978-1-74104-317-4.
- Mitch Hendrickson u. a. (2009), University of Sydney (ed.), Industries of Angkor Project: Preah Khan of Kampong Svay (Bakan), Field Campaign Report (in German) – Download.
- Bruno Bruguier, Juliette Lacroix (2013). Preah Khan, Koh Ker et Preah Vihear. Les provinces occidentales. Guide archéologique du Cambodge, Tome 5. JSRC. ISBN 978-99963-612-0-3.
