= Preah Vihear Municipality =

Preah Vihear Municipality ក្រុងព្រះវិហារ
- Municipality
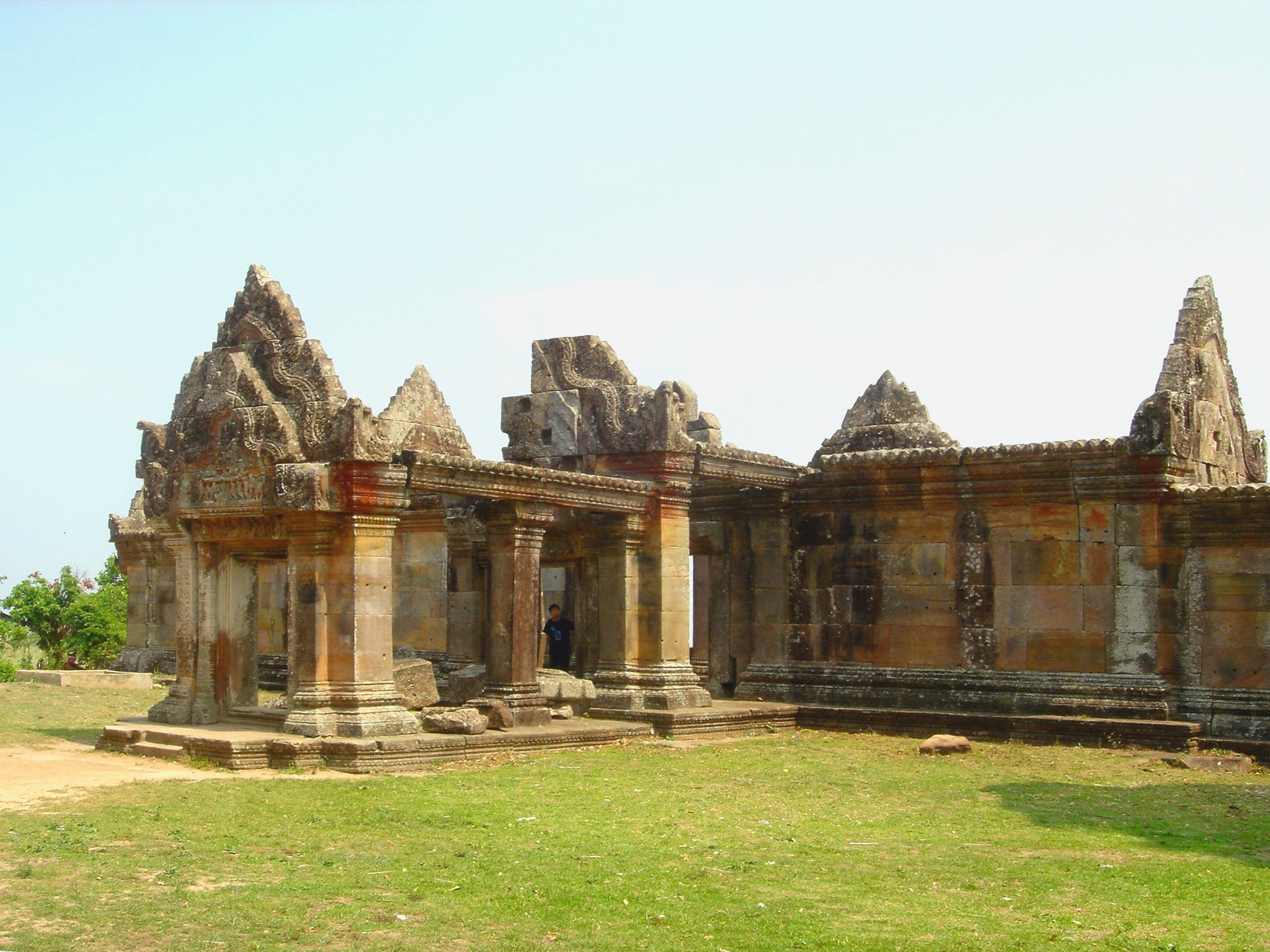

- Location within Cambodia
- Coordinates: 13°49′N 104°58′E
- Country: Cambodia
- Province: Preah Vihear
- Quarters: 2
- Capital: Preah Vihear

Government
  - Type: City municipality

Population (2008)
  - Total: 21,179
- Time zone: UTC+7 (ICT)

Preah Vihear Municipality (Khmer: ក្រុងព្រះវិហារ, Krong Preah Vihear) is a municipality located in Preah Vihear Province in northern Cambodia. The provincial capital Preah Vihear is located in the municipality.

== Administration ==
No.	District Code	Sangkat (Quarters)
1	1904-01	Kampong Pranak សង្កាត់កំពង់ប្រណាក
2	1904-02	Pal Hal សង្កាត់ប៉ាលហាល
