= Bahal, Iran =

Village in Hormozgan province, Iran

Bahal Persian: بحل
- Village
- Location within Iran
- Coordinates: 25°41′27″N 57°51′37″E
- Country: Iran
- Province: Hormozgan
- County: Jask
- District: Central
- Rural District: Jask

Population (2016)
  - Total: 1,775
- Time zone: UTC+3:30 (IRST)

Bahal (Persian: بحل) (Note: Also romanized as Baḥal, Beḩal, and Beḩel) is a village in Jask Rural District of the Central District of Jask County, Hormozgan province, Iran.

== Demographics ==
=== Population ===
At the time of the 2006 National Census, the village's population was 1,359 in 227 households. The following census in 2011 counted 1,721 people in 355 households. The 2016 census measured the population of the village as 1,775 people in 426 households. It was the most populous village in its rural district.
