= Stueng Hav District =

Coordinates: 10.7014°N 103.6131°E

Stueng Hav District ស្រុកស្ទឹងហាវ
- District
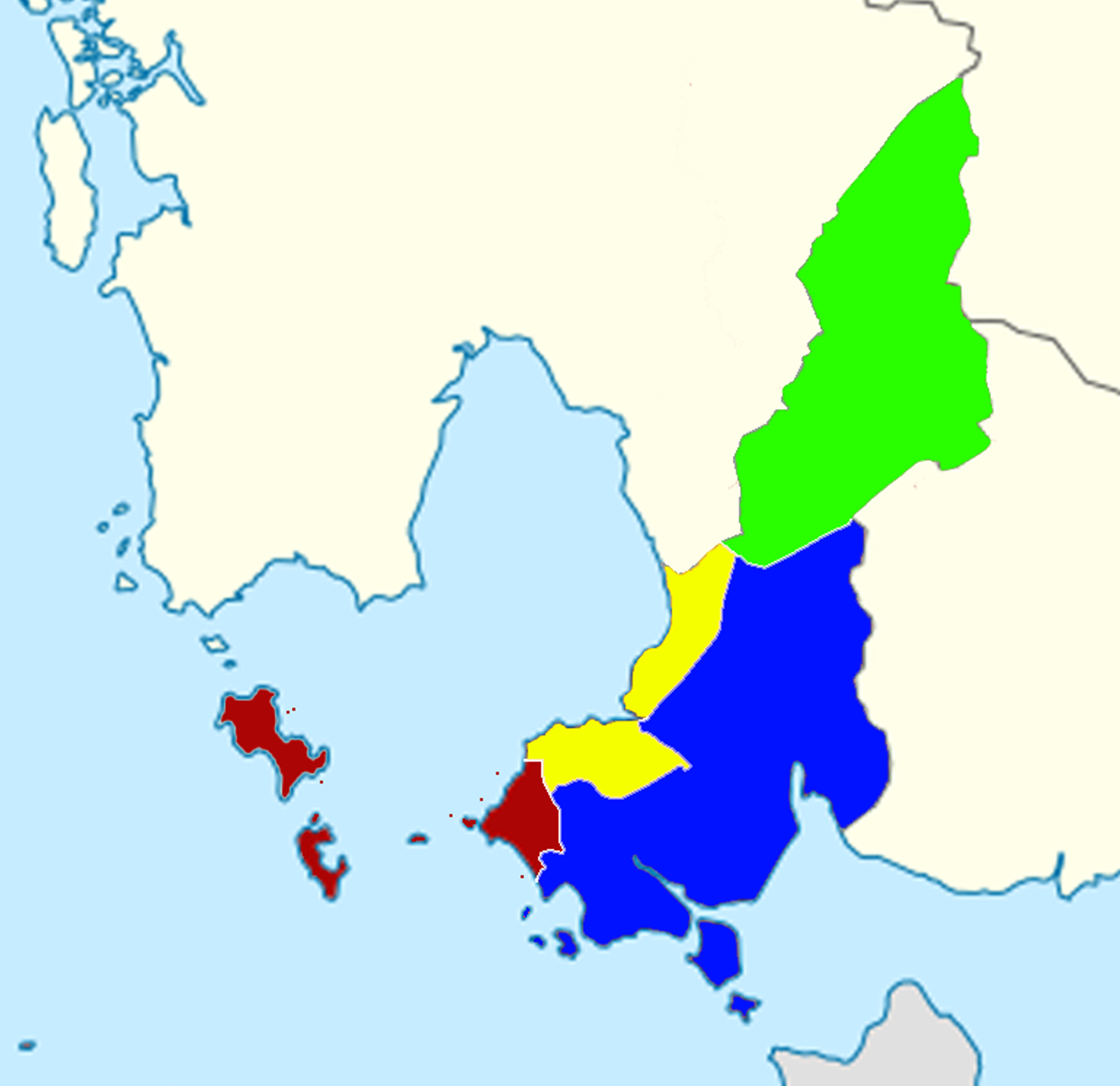
- Sihanoukville Province districts: Sihanoukville Municipality (red), Stueng Hav (yellow), Prey Nob (blue), Kampong Seila (green)
- Country: Cambodia
- Province: Sihanoukville

Population
  - Total: 13,108

Composition
  - Communes: 3
  - Villages: 10
- Time zone: UTC+7 (ICT)
- Geocode: 1803

Stueng Hav District (Khmer: ស្រុកស្ទឹងហាវ) is one of four districts (srok) of Sihanoukville province in Cambodia. In 1998, it had a population of 13,108.
