= List of districts, municipalities and sections in Cambodia =

District, Municipality and Section ស្រុក ក្រុង និងខណ្ឌ (Khmer)
- Category: Second-level administrative subdivision of a unitary state
- Location: Cambodia
- Number: 210
- Subdivisions: Commune and quarter

This is a list of Cambodia's 163 districts (ស្រុក srok), 33 district-level municipalities (ក្រុង krong) and 14 sections (ខណ្ឌ khan) organized by each province and an autonomous municipality (Phnom Penh).

== Banteay Meanchey ==
Banteay Meanchey contains 7 Districts (ស្រុក Srok), 2 Municipalities (ក្រុង Krong) and 666 Villages (ភូមិ Phum).

#	Name	Khmer	UNGEGN	Administrative Unit	Geocode
1	Mongkol Borey	មង្គលបូរី		District (ស្រុក Srok)	0102
2	Phnum Srok	ភ្នំស្រុក		District (ស្រុក Srok)	0103
3	Preah Netr Preah	ព្រះនេត្រព្រះ		District (ស្រុក Srok)	0104
4	Ou Chrov	អូរជ្រៅ		District (ស្រុក Srok)	0105
5	Serei Saophoan	សិរីសោភ័ណ		Municipality (ក្រុង Krong)	0106
6	Thma Puok	ថ្មពួក		District (ស្រុក Srok)	0107
7	Svay Chek	ស្វាយចេក		District (ស្រុក Srok)	0108
8	Malai	ម៉ាឡៃ		District (ស្រុក Srok)	0109
9	Poipet	ប៉ោយប៉ែត	Paôypêt	Municipality (ក្រុង Krong)	0110

== Battambang ==
Battambang contains 13 Districts (ស្រុក Srok), 1 Municipality (ក្រុង Krong) and 844 Villages (ភូមិ Phum).

#	Name	Khmer	UNGEGN	Administrative Unit	Geocode
1	Banan	បាណន់		District (ស្រុក Srok)	0201
2	Thma Koul	ថ្មគោល		District (ស្រុក Srok)	0202
3	Battambang	បាត់ដំបង		Municipality (ក្រុង Krong)	0203
4	Bavel	បវេល		District (ស្រុក Srok)	0204
5	Aek Phnum	ឯកភ្នំ		District (ស្រុក Srok)	0205
6	Moung Ruessei	មោងឫស្សី		District (ស្រុក Srok)	0206
7	Rotonak Mondol	រតនមណ្ឌល		District (ស្រុក Srok)	0207
8	Sangkae	សង្កែ		District (ស្រុក Srok)	0208
9	Samlout	សំឡូត		District (ស្រុក Srok)	0209
10	Sampov Lun	សំពៅលូន	Sâmpŏu Lun	District (ស្រុក Srok)	0210
11	Phnum Proek	ភ្នំព្រឹក		District (ស្រុក Srok)	0211
12	Kamrieng	កំរៀង		District (ស្រុក Srok)	0212
13	Koas Krala	គាស់ក្រឡ		District (ស្រុក Srok)	0213
14	Rukh Kiri	រុក្ខគិរី		District (ស្រុក Srok)	0214

== Kampong Cham ==
Kampong Cham contains 9 Districts (ស្រុក Srok), 1 Municipality (ក្រុង Krong) and 947 Villages (ភូមិ Phum).

#	Name	Khmer	UNGEGN	Administrative Unit	Geocode
1	Batheay	បាធាយ		District (ស្រុក Srok)	0301
2	Chamkar Leu	ចំការលើ		District (ស្រុក Srok)	0302
3	Cheung Prey	ជើងព្រៃ		District (ស្រុក Srok)	0303
4	Kampong Cham	កំពង់ចាម		Municipality (ក្រុង Krong)	0305
5	Kampong Siem	កំពង់សៀម		District (ស្រុក Srok)	0306
6	Kang Meas	កងមាស		District (ស្រុក Srok)	0307
7	Kaoh Soutin	កោះសូទិន		District (ស្រុក Srok)	0308
8	Prey Chhor	ព្រៃឈរ		District (ស្រុក Srok)	0313
9	Srei Santhor	ស្រីសន្ធរ		District (ស្រុក Srok)	0314
10	Stueng Trang	ស្ទឹងត្រង់		District (ស្រុក Srok)	0315

== Kampong Chhnang ==
Kampong Chhnang contains 7 Districts (ស្រុក Srok), 1 Municipality (ក្រុង Krong) and 569 Villages (ភូមិ Phum).

#	Name	Khmer	UNGEGN	Administrative Unit	Geocode
1	Baribour	បរិបូណ៌		District (ស្រុក Srok)	0401
2	Chol Kiri	ជលគីរី		District (ស្រុក Srok)	0402
3	Kampong Chhnang	កំពង់ឆ្នាំង		Municipality (ក្រុង Krong)	0403
4	Kampong Leaeng	កំពង់លែង		District (ស្រុក Srok)	0404
5	Kampong Tralach	កំពង់ត្រឡាច		District (ស្រុក Srok)	0405
6	Rolea B'ier	រលាប្អៀរ		District (ស្រុក Srok)	0406
7	Sameakki Mean Chey	សាមគ្គីមានជ័យ		District (ស្រុក Srok)	0407
8	Tuek Phos	ទឹកផុស		District (ស្រុក Srok)	0408

== Kampong Speu ==
Kampong Speu contains 7 Districts (ស្រុក Srok), 2 Municipalities (ក្រុង Krong) and 1,365 Villages (ភូមិ Phum).

#	Name	Khmer	UNGEGN	Administrative Unit	Geocode
1	Basedth	បរសេដ្ឋ		District (ស្រុក Srok)	0501
2	Chbar Mon	ច្បារមន		Municipality (ក្រុង Krong)	0502
3	Kong Pisei	គងពិសី		District (ស្រុក Srok)	0503
4	Aural	ឱរ៉ាល់		District (ស្រុក Srok)	0504
5	Phnum Sruoch	ភ្នំស្រួច		District (ស្រុក Srok)	0506
6	Samraong Tong	សំរោងទង		District (ស្រុក Srok)	0507
7	Thpong	ថ្ពង		District (ស្រុក Srok)	0508
8	Odongk Maechay	ឧដុង្គម៉ែជ័យ		Municipality (ក្រុង Krong)	0509
9	Samkkei Munichay	សាមគ្គីមុនីជ័យ		District (ស្រុក Srok)	0510

== Kampong Thom ==
Kampong Thom contains 8 Districts (ស្រុក Srok), 1 Municipality (ក្រុង Krong) and 765 Villages (ភូមិ Phum).

#	Name	Khmer	UNGEGN	Administrative Unit	Geocode
1	Baray	បារាយណ៍		District (ស្រុក Srok)	0601
2	Kampong Svay	កំពង់ស្វាយ		District (ស្រុក Srok)	0602
3	Stueng Saen	ស្ទឹងសែន		Municipality (ក្រុង Krong)	0603
4	Prasat Ballangk	ប្រាសាទបល្ល័ង្គ		District (ស្រុក Srok)	0604
5	Prasat Sambour	ប្រាសាទសំបូរ		District (ស្រុក Srok)	0605
6	Sandan	សណ្ដាន់		District (ស្រុក Srok)	0606
7	Santuk	សន្ទុក		District (ស្រុក Srok)	0607
8	Stoung	ស្ទោង		District (ស្រុក Srok)	0608
9	Taing Kouk	តាំងគោក		District (ស្រុក Srok)	0609

== Kampot ==
Kampot contains 7 Districts (ស្រុក Srok), 2 Municipalities (ក្រុង Krong) and 491 Villages (ភូមិ Phum).

#	Name	Khmer	UNGEGN	Administrative Unit	Geocode
1	Angkor Chey	អង្គរជ័យ	Ǎngkô Chei	District (ស្រុក Srok)	0701
2	Banteay Meas	បន្ទាយមាស	Bǎntiay Miah	District (ស្រុក Srok)	0702
3	Chhuk	ឈូក	Chhuk	District (ស្រុក Srok)	0703
4	Chum Kiri	ជុំគិរី	Chŭm Kĭri	District (ស្រុក Srok)	0704
5	Dang Tong	ដងទង់	Dâng Tǒng	District (ស្រុក Srok)	0705
6	Kampong Trach	កំពង់ត្រាច	Kǎmpǒng Trach	District (ស្រុក Srok)	0706
7	Tuek Chhou	ទឹកឈូ	Tuĕk Chhu	District (ស្រុក Srok)	0707
8	Kampot	កំពត	Kǎmpôt	Municipality (ក្រុង Krong)	0708
9	Bokor	បូកគោ	Bokko	Municipality (ក្រុង Krong)	0709

== Kandal ==
Kandal contains 10 Districts (ស្រុក Srok), 3 Municipalities (ក្រុង Krong) and 1,010 Villages (ភូមិ Phum).

#	Name	Khmer	UNGEGN	Administrative Unit	Geocode
1	Kandal Stueng	កណ្ដាលស្ទឹង	Kǎndal Stuĕng	District (ស្រុក Srok)	0801
2	Kien Svay	កៀនស្វាយ	Kian Svay	District (ស្រុក Srok)	0802
3	Khsach Kandal	ខ្សាច់កណ្ដាល	Khsăch Kǎndal	District (ស្រុក Srok)	0803
4	Kaoh Thum	កោះធំ	Kăh Thŏm	District (ស្រុក Srok)	0804
5	Leuk Daek	លើកដែក	Loek Daek	District (ស្រុក Srok)	0805
6	Lvea Aem	ល្វាឯម	Lvia Aem	District (ស្រុក Srok)	0806
7	Mukh Kampul	មុខកំពូល	Mŭk Kǎmpul	District (ស្រុក Srok)	0807
8	Angk Snuol	អង្គស្នួល	Ǎng Snual	District (ស្រុក Srok)	0808
9	Ponhea Lueu	ពញាឮ	Pnhia Lue	District (ស្រុក Srok)	0809
10	S'ang	ស្អាង	S’ang	District (ស្រុក Srok)	0810
11	Ta Khmau	តាខ្មៅ	Ta Khmau	Municipality (ក្រុង Krong)	0811
12	Sampeou Poun	សំពៅពូន	Sǎmpoeu Puan	Municipality (ក្រុង Krong)	0812
13	Arey Ksat	អរិយក្សត្រ	Ărĕy Ksăt	Municipality (ក្រុង Krong)	0813

== Kep ==
Kep contains 1 District (ស្រុក Srok), 1 Municipality (ក្រុង Krong) and 18 Villages (ភូមិ Phum).

#	Name	Khmer	UNGEGN	Administrative Unit	Geocode
1	Damnak Chang'aeur	ដំណាក់ចង្អើរ	Dǎmnăk Chǎng'aoe	District (ស្រុក Srok)	2301
2	Kep	កែប	Kaep	Municipality (ក្រុង Krong)	2302

== Koh Kong ==
Koh Kong contains 6 Districts (ស្រុក Srok), 1 Municipality (ក្រុង Krong) and 119 Villages (ភូមិ Phum).

#	Name	Khmer	UNGEGN	Administrative Unit	Geocode
1	Botum Sakor	បុទុមសាគរ		District (ស្រុក Srok)	0901
2	Kiri Sakor	គិរីសាគរ		District (ស្រុក Srok)	0902
3	Kaoh Kong	កោះកុង		District (ស្រុក Srok)	0903
4	Khemara Phoumin	ខេមរភូមិន្ទ		Municipality (ក្រុង Krong)	0904
5	Mondol Seima	មណ្ឌលសីមា		District (ស្រុក Srok)	0905
6	Srae Ambel	ស្រែ អំបិល		District (ស្រុក Srok)	0906
7	Thma Bang	ថ្មបាំង		District (ស្រុក Srok)	0907

== Kratié ==
Kratié contains 6 Districts (ស្រុក Srok), 1 Municipality (ក្រុង Krong) and 327 Villages (ភូមិ Phum).

#	Name	Khmer	UNGEGN	Administrative Unit	Geocode
1	Chhloung	ឆ្លូង		District (ស្រុក Srok)	1001
2	Kracheh	ក្រចេះ		Municipality (ក្រុង Krong)	1002
3	Prek Prasab	ព្រែកប្រសព្វ		District (ស្រុក Srok)	1003
4	Sambour	សំបូរ		District (ស្រុក Srok)	1004
5	Snuol	ស្នួល		District (ស្រុក Srok)	1005
6	Chetr Borei	ចិត្របុរី		District (ស្រុក Srok)	1006
7	Ou Krieng Saenchey	អូរគ្រៀងសែនជ័យ		District (ស្រុក Srok)	1007

== Mondulkiri ==
Mondulkiri contains 4 Districts (ស្រុក Srok), 1 Municipality (ក្រុង Krong) and 92 Villages (ភូមិ Phum).

#	Name	Khmer	UNGEGN	Administrative Unit	Geocode
1	Kaev Seima	កែវសីមា		District (ស្រុក Srok)	1101
2	Kaoh Nheaek	កោះញែក		District (ស្រុក Srok)	1102
3	Ou Reang	អូររាំង		District (ស្រុក Srok)	1103
4	Pech Chreada	ពេជ្រាដា		District (ស្រុក Srok)	1104
5	Saen Monourom	សែនមនោរម្យ		Municipality (ក្រុង Krong)	1105

== Oddar Meanchey ==
Oddar Meanchey contains 4 Districts (ស្រុក Srok), 1 Municipality (ក្រុង Krong) and 308 Villages (ភូមិ Phum).

#	Name	Khmer	UNGEGN	Administrative Unit	Geocode
1	Anlong Veaeng	អន្លង់វែង		District (ស្រុក Srok)	2201
2	Banteay Ampil	បន្ទាយអំពិល		District (ស្រុក Srok)	2202
3	Chong Kal	ចុងកាល់		District (ស្រុក Srok)	2203
4	Samraong	សំរោង		Municipality (ក្រុង Krong)	2204
5	Trapeang Prasat	ត្រពាំងប្រាសាទ		District (ស្រុក Srok)	2205

== Pailin ==
Pailin contains 1 Municipality (ក្រុង Krong), 1 District (ស្រុក Srok) and 92 Villages (ភូមិ Phum).

#	Name	Khmer	UNGEGN	Administrative Unit	Geocode
1	Pailin	ប៉ៃលិន		Municipality (ក្រុង Krong)	2401
2	Sala Krau	សាលាក្រៅ		District (ស្រុក Srok)	2402

== Phnom Penh (autonomous municipality) ==
Phnom Penh contains 14 Sections (ខណ្ឌ Khan) and 953 Villages (ភូមិ Phum).

#	Name	Khmer	UNGEGN	Administrative Unit	Geocode
1	Chamkar Mon	ចំការមន		Section (ខណ្ឌ Khan)	1201
2	Doun Penh	ដូនពេញ		Section (ខណ្ឌ Khan)	1202
3	Prampir Meakkakra	៧មករា		Section (ខណ្ឌ Khan)	1203
4	Tuol Kouk	ទួលគោក		Section (ខណ្ឌ Khan)	1204
5	Dangkao	ដង្កោ		Section (ខណ្ឌ Khan)	1205
6	Mean Chey	មានជ័យ		Section (ខណ្ឌ Khan)	1206
7	Russey Keo	ឫស្សីកែវ		Section (ខណ្ឌ Khan)	1207
8	Sen Sok	សែនសុខ		Section (ខណ្ឌ Khan)	1208
9	Pur SenChey	ពោធិ៍សែនជ័យ		Section (ខណ្ឌ Khan)	1209
10	Chrouy Changvar	ជ្រោយចង្វារ		Section (ខណ្ឌ Khan)	1210
11	Praek Pnov	ព្រែកព្នៅ		Section (ខណ្ឌ Khan)	1211
12	Chbar Ampov	ច្បារអំពៅ		Section (ខណ្ឌ Khan)	1212
13	Boeng Keng Kang	បឹងកេងកង		Section (ខណ្ឌ Khan)	1213
14	Kamboul	កំបូល		Section (ខណ្ឌ Khan)	1214

== Preah Vihear ==
Preah Vihear contains 7 Districts (ស្រុក Srok), 1 Municipality (ក្រុង Krong) and 232 Villages (ភូមិ Phum).

#	Name	Khmer	UNGEGN	Administrative Unit	Geocode
1	Chey Saen	ជ័យសែន		District (ស្រុក Srok)	1301
2	Chhaeb	ឆែប		District (ស្រុក Srok)	1302
3	Choam Ksant	ជាំក្សាន្ដ		District (ស្រុក Srok)	1303
4	Kuleaen	គូលែន		District (ស្រុក Srok)	1304
5	Rovieng	រវៀង		District (ស្រុក Srok)	1305
6	Sangkum Thmei	សង្គមថ្មី		District (ស្រុក Srok)	1306
7	Tbaeng Mean Chey	ត្បែងមានជ័យ		District (ស្រុក Srok)	1307
8	Preah Vihear	ព្រះវិហារ		Municipality (ក្រុង Krong)	1308

== Pursat ==
Pursat contains 6 Districts (ស្រុក Srok), 1 Municipality (ក្រុង Krong) and 526 Villages (ភូមិ Phum).

#	Name	Khmer	UNGEGN	Administrative Unit	Geocode
1	Bakan	បាកាន		District (ស្រុក Srok)	1501
2	Kandieng	កណ្ដៀង		District (ស្រុក Srok)	1502
3	Krakor	ក្រគរ		District (ស្រុក Srok)	1503
4	Phnum Kravanh	ភ្នំក្រវ៉ាញ		District (ស្រុក Srok)	1504
5	Pursat	ពោធិ៍សាត់		Municipality (ក្រុង Krong)	1505
6	Veal Veaeng	វាលវែង		District (ស្រុក Srok)	1506
7	Ta Lou Senchey	តាលោសែនជ័យ		District (ស្រុក Srok)	1507

== Prey Veng ==
Prey Veng contains 12 Districts (ស្រុក Srok), 1 Municipality (ក្រុង Krong) and 1,168 Villages (ភូមិ Phum).

#	Name	Khmer	UNGEGN	Administrative Unit	Geocode
1	Ba Phnum	បាភ្នំ		District (ស្រុក Srok)	1401
2	Kamchay Mear	កំចាយមារ		District (ស្រុក Srok)	1402
3	Kampong Trabaek	កំពង់ត្របែក		District (ស្រុក Srok)	1403
4	Kanhchriech	កញ្ជ្រៀច		District (ស្រុក Srok)	1404
5	Me Sang	មេសាង		District (ស្រុក Srok)	1405
6	Peam Chor	ពាមជរ		District (ស្រុក Srok)	1406
7	Peam Ro	ពាមរក៍		District (ស្រុក Srok)	1407
8	Pea Reang	ពារាំង		District (ស្រុក Srok)	1408
9	Preah Sdach	ព្រះស្ដេច		District (ស្រុក Srok)	1409
10	Prey Veng	ព្រៃវែង		Municipality (ក្រុង Krong)	1410
11	Pur Rieng	ពោធិ៍រៀង		District (ស្រុក Srok)	1411
12	Sithor Kandal	ស៊ីធរកណ្ដាល		District (ស្រុក Srok)	1412
13	Svay Antor	ស្វាយអន្ទរ		District (ស្រុក Srok)	1413

== Ratanakiri ==
Ratanakiri contains 8 Districts (ស្រុក Srok), 1 Municipality (ក្រុង Krong) and 243 Villages (ភូមិ Phum).

#	Name	Khmer	UNGEGN	Administrative Unit	Geocode
1	Andoung Meas	អណ្ដូងមាស		District (ស្រុក Srok)	1601
2	Ban Lung	បានលុង		Municipality (ក្រុង Krong)	1602
3	Bar Kaev	បរកែវ		District (ស្រុក Srok)	1603
4	Koun Mom	កូនមុំ		District (ស្រុក Srok)	1604
5	Lumphat	លំផាត់		District (ស្រុក Srok)	1605
6	Ou Chum	អូរជុំ		District (ស្រុក Srok)	1606
7	Ou Ya Dav	អូរយ៉ាដាវ		District (ស្រុក Srok)	1607
8	Ta Veaeng	តាវែង		District (ស្រុក Srok)	1608
9	Veun Sai	វើនសៃ		District (ស្រុក Srok)	1609

== Siem Reap ==
Siem Reap contains 11 Districts (ស្រុក Srok), 2 Municipalities (ក្រុង Krong) and 909 Villages (ភូមិ Phum).

#	Name	Khmer	UNGEGN	Administrative Unit	Geocode
1	Angkor Chum	អង្គរជុំ		District (ស្រុក Srok)	1701
2	Angkor Thum	អង្គរធំ		District (ស្រុក Srok)	1702
3	Banteay Srei	បន្ទាយស្រី		District (ស្រុក Srok)	1703
4	Chi Kraeng	ជីក្រែង		District (ស្រុក Srok)	1704
5	Kralanh	ក្រឡាញ់		District (ស្រុក Srok)	1706
6	Puok	ពួក		District (ស្រុក Srok)	1707
7	Prasat Bakong	ប្រាសាទបាគង		District (ស្រុក Srok)	1709
8	Siem Reap	សៀមរាប	Siĕm Réab	Municipality (ក្រុង Krong)	1710
9	Soutr Nikom	សូទ្រនិគម		District (ស្រុក Srok)	1711
10	Srei Snam	ស្រីស្នំ		District (ស្រុក Srok)	1712
11	Svay Leu	ស្វាយលើ		District (ស្រុក Srok)	1713
12	Varin	វ៉ារិន		District (ស្រុក Srok)	1714
13	Run Ta Aek Techo Sen	រុនតាឯកតេជោសែន		Municipality (ក្រុង Krong)	1715

== Preah Sihanouk ==
Preah Sihanouk contains 3 Municipalities (ក្រុង Krong), 3 Districts (ស្រុក Srok) and 111 Villages (ភូមិ Phum).

#	Name	Khmer	UNGEGN	Administrative Unit	Geocode
1	Preah Sihanouk	ព្រះសីហនុ		Municipality (ក្រុង Krong)	1801
2	Prey Nob	ព្រៃនប់		District (ស្រុក Srok)	1802
3	Stueng Hav	ស្ទឹងហាវ		District (ស្រុក Srok)	1803
4	Kampong Seila	កំពង់សីលា		District (ស្រុក Srok)	1804
5	Kaoh Rung	កោះរ៉ុង		Municipality (ក្រុង Krong)	1805
6	Kampong Soam	កំពង់សោម		Municipality (ក្រុង Krong)	1806

== Stung Treng ==
Stung Treng contains 5 Districts (ស្រុក Srok), 1 Municipality (ក្រុង Krong) and 137 Villages (ភូមិ Phum).

#	Name	Khmer	UNGEGN	Administrative Unit	Geocode
1	Sesan	សេសាន		District (ស្រុក Srok)	1901
2	Siem Bouk	សៀមបូក		District (ស្រុក Srok)	1902
3	Siem Pang	សៀមប៉ាង		District (ស្រុក Srok)	1903
4	Stueng Traeng	ស្ទឹងត្រែង		Municipality (ក្រុង Krong)	1904
5	Thala Barivat	ថាឡាបរិវ៉ាត់		District (ស្រុក Srok)	1905
6	Borei Ou Svay Senchey	បុរីអូរស្វាយសែនជ័យ		District (ស្រុក Srok)	1906

== Svay Rieng ==
Svay Rieng contains 6 Districts (ស្រុក Srok), 2 Municipalities (ក្រុង Krong) and 690 Villages (ភូមិ Phum).

#	Name	Khmer	UNGEGN	Administrative Unit	Geocode
1	Chantrea	ចន្ទ្រា	Chântréa	District (ស្រុក Srok)	2001
2	Kampong Rou	កំពង់រោទិ៍	Kâmpóng Roŭt	District (ស្រុក Srok)	2002
3	Rumduol	រំដួល		District (ស្រុក Srok)	2003
4	Romeas Haek	រមាសហែក		District (ស្រុក Srok)	2004
5	Svay Chrum	ស្វាយជ្រំ		District (ស្រុក Srok)	2005
6	Svay Rieng	ស្វាយរៀង		Municipality (ក្រុង Krong)	2006
7	Svay Teab	ស្វាយទាប		District (ស្រុក Srok)	2007
8	Bavet	បាវិត		Municipality (ក្រុង Krong)	2008

== Takéo ==
Takéo contains 9 Districts (ស្រុក Srok), 1 Municipality (ក្រុង Krong) and 1,121 Villages (ភូមិ Phum).

#	Name	Khmer	UNGEGN	Administrative Unit	Geocode
1	Angkor Borei	អង្គរបូរី		District (ស្រុក Srok)	2101
2	Bati	បាទី		District (ស្រុក Srok)	2102
3	Borei Cholsar	បូរីជលសារ		District (ស្រុក Srok)	2103
4	Kiri Vong	គីរីវង់		District (ស្រុក Srok)	2104
5	Kaoh Andaet	កោះអណ្ដែត		District (ស្រុក Srok)	2105
6	Prey Kabbas	ព្រៃកប្បាស		District (ស្រុក Srok)	2106
7	Samraong	សំរោង		District (ស្រុក Srok)	2107
8	Doun Kaev	ដូនកែវ		Municipality (ក្រុង Krong)	2108
9	Tram Kak	ត្រាំកក់		District (ស្រុក Srok)	2109
10	Treang	ទ្រាំង		District (ស្រុក Srok)	2110

== Tboung Khmum ==
Tboung Khmum contains 6 Districts (ស្រុក Srok), 1 Municipality (ក្រុង Krong) and 875 Villages (ភូមិ Phum).

#	Name	Khmer	UNGEGN	Administrative Unit	Geocode
1	Dambae	តំបែរ		District (ស្រុក Srok)	2501
2	Krouch Chhmar	ក្រូចឆ្មារ		District (ស្រុក Srok)	2502
3	Memot	មេមត់		District (ស្រុក Srok)	2503
4	Ou Reang Ov	អូររាំងឪ		District (ស្រុក Srok)	2504
5	Ponhea Kraek	ពញាក្រែក		District (ស្រុក Srok)	2505
6	Suong	សួង		Municipality (ក្រុង Krong)	2506
7	Tboung Khmum	ត្បូងឃ្មុំ		District (ស្រុក Srok)	2507
