= Preah Sihanouk municipality =

Municipality in Preah Sihanouk Province, Cambodia

Coordinates: 10.6166°N 103.5247°E

Preah Sihanouk Municipality ក្រុងព្រះសីហនុ Krong Preah Sihanouk
- Municipality
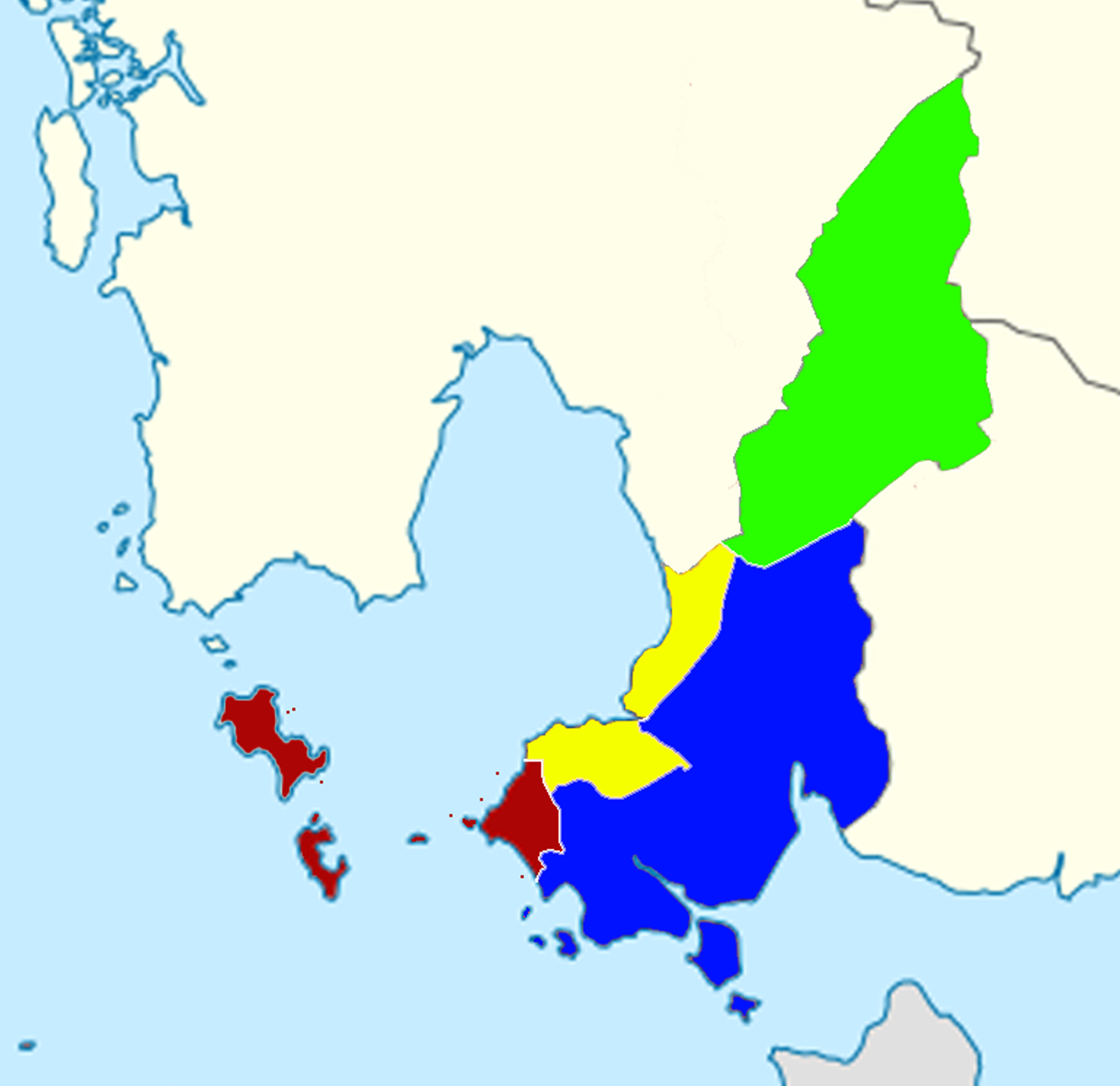
- Sihanoukville Province's districts: Sihanoukville Municipality (dark red), Stueng Hav (yellow), Prey Nob (blue), Kampong Seila (green)
- Country: Cambodia
- Province: Preah Sihanouk Province
- Time zone: UTC+07:00 (ICT)
- Postal code: 18000
- Area code: 034
- Geocode: 1801
- Website: sihanoukville.gov.kh/en/

Preah Sihanouk Municipality, also Krong Preah Sihanouk (Khmer: ក្រុងព្រះសីហនុ, Krŏng Preăh Seihânŭ), is one of the four districts of Sihanoukville Province in Cambodia. In 1998, it had an urban population of 67,440. In addition to the city of Sihanoukville and the Sihanoukville Autonomous Port, the islands Koh Puos, Koh Preab, Koh Doung, Koh Kaong Kang, Koh Tres, Koh Koun, Koh Tuich, Koh Rong, and Koh Rong Sanloem are under Sihanoukville’s administration.

Communes of Preah Sihanouk Municipality
ISO code	Commune	Romanization	Population	Sections	Urban
180101	សង្កាត់មួយ	Sangkat Muoy	37,440	3	Yes
180102	សង្កាត់ពីរ	Sangkat Pir	25,142	3	Yes
180103	សង្កាត់បី	Sangkat Bei	13,108	3	Majority
180104	សង្កាត់បួន	Sangkat Buon	13,108	6	Majority

== See also ==
- Ream National Park
