= Seniehun =

Coordinates: 7°31′55″N 12°01′01″W

Seniehun (also, Bahal, Senbehun, and Senjehun) is a village in the Bonthe District of the Southern Province of Sierra Leone.
