= Prey Nob District =

District in Preah Sihanouk Province, Cambodia

Coordinates: 10.6282°N 103.7755°E

Prey Nob ព្រៃនប់
- District
- Prey Nob District; ស្រុកព្រៃនប់
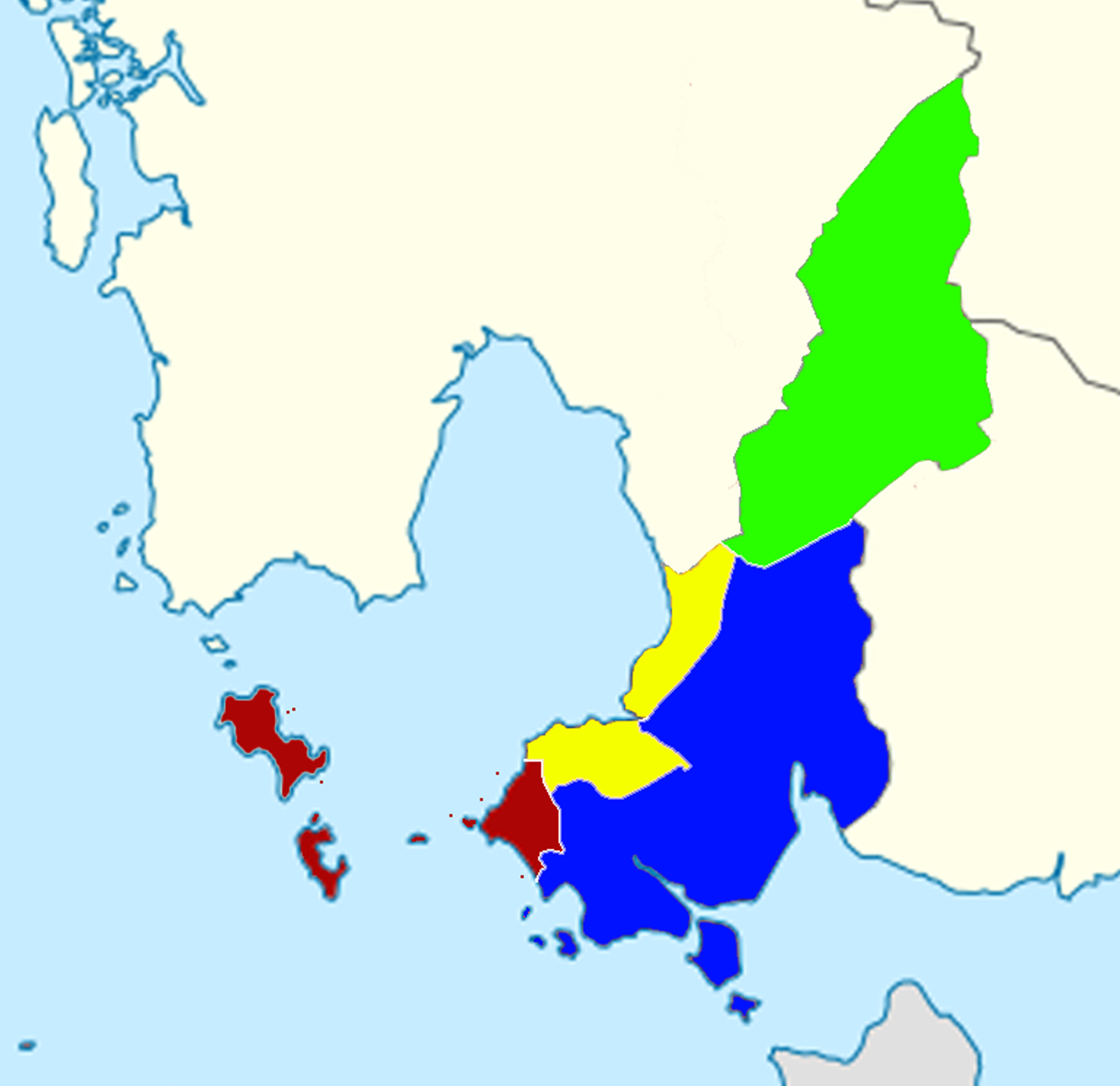
- Sihanoukville Province’s subdivisions: Sihanoukville Municipality (dark red), Stueng Hav (yellow), Prey Nob (blue), Kampong Seila (green)
- Country: Cambodia
- Province: Preah Sihanouk

Population (2008)
  - Total: 89,238
- Time zone: UTC+07:00 (ICT)
- Geocode: 1802

Prey Nob (Khmer: ព្រៃនប់ [prəj nɔp]) is one of four district (srok) of Preah Sihanouk Province, Cambodia. According to the 2008 census of Cambodia, it had a population of 89,238.
