= Win-Win Memorial =

- វិមានឈ្នះ-ឈ្នះ
- Interactive map of Win-Win Memorial
- Location: Ly Yongphat St., Kandal
- Coordinates: 11.678435°N 104.885435°E
- Type: Monument
- Material: Marble, concrete
- Height: 54 metres (177 ft)
- Beginning date: 25 February 2016
- Opening date: 31 December 2018
- Dedicated to: End of civil wars in Cambodia

The Win-Win Memorial (Khmer: វិមានឈ្នះ-ឈ្នះ, Vĭméan Chhneăh-Chhneăh [ʋimiən cʰneah.cʰneah]) is a monument that marks the end of civil wars in Cambodia and through then Prime Minister Hun Sen's Win-Win policy. It was also inaugurated on 31 December 2018 by Sen to mark the end of the civil war 20 years ago. The monument stands on a 8 hectare plaza with eight pools, various sculptures, and the base is 117 meters, featuring bas-reliefs depicting the journey to peace. It cost $12 million and was designed in a modernist Khmer style architecture.
