= Bahal Tambunan =

Indonesian geoscientist (born 1974)

Bahal Raja Tua Tambunan BEnGL

Senior Member of AAPG
- Incumbent
- Assumed office 19 January 2023
- President: Franciszek J. Hasiuk

Personal details
- Born: February 23, 1974 (age 52) Sidikalang, North Sumatra, Indonesia
- Citizenship: Indonesia
- Spouse: Dr. Nathalin Sarah Dora Marpaung
- Relations: Jafar Nainggolan (Uncle of wife)
- Children: Pangeran Richard Timotius Tambunan; Gihon Sargon Tambunan
- Education: Institut Teknologi Bandung
- Occupation: Geologist

Bahal Raja Tua Tambunan BEnGL (Indonesian: [ˌbahal ˌrad͡ʒa t̪amˈbunan]; born 23 February 1974) is an Indonesian geologist who has served as a senior member for the AAPG since 2023.

In 2001, he collaborated with professors from Harvard University and NASA on a featured journal about geothermal reservoir characterization, he works in Eni S.p.A, an Italian multinational oil and gas company with operations in 43 countries.

He has published several articles in journals and led conferences of the Society of Exploration Geophysicists (SEG) and AAPG, he is also currently a member of the Association of Indonesian Geologist (IAGI).

== Early life and education ==
Tambunan was born in Sidikalang, a city in North Sumatra, Indonesia. He studied primary and secondary education in Sidikalang, where he developed an interest in science and mathematics.

He then continued his higher education at the Bandung Institute of Technology, where he graduated with a bachelor's degree in geological engineering, geophysical engineering study program in October 1997.

== Career ==
Tambunan started his career as a geologist at PT. VICO Indonesia, the Indonesian branch of an American and British oil and gas company which later merged with Eni, in 1997. He worked on various exploration and production projects in various regions in Indonesia, such as Sumatra, Java, Kalimantan and Sulawesi . He has worked on various oil and gas projects in Indonesia and internationally with companies such as Shell, Chevron, and Total.

In 2000, he joined Eni as a senior geoscientist and was assigned to the oil and gas division.

He also worked on oil and gas projects for Eni in other countries, such as Libya, Pakistan, Angola, Ghana and Italy.

He is also involved in other oil and gas projects with Eni, such as the Merakes gas field in Indonesia and Block 15/06 in Angola.

== Personal life ==
Tambunan is married to Nathalin Sarah Dora Marpaung, a doctor, in 2004, they have two children aged 16 and 18 years old. He lives in Jakarta, Indonesia.
