= Preah Vihear (town) =

Krong Preah Vihear ក្រុងព្រះវិហារ
- City Municipality
- Location within Cambodia
- Coordinates: 13°49′N 104°58′E
- Country: Cambodia
- Province: Preah Vihear
- Municipality: Preah Vihear

Government
  - Type: City municipality

Population (2019)
  - Total: 24,360
- Time zone: UTC+7 (Cambodia)
- Area code: 855 (064)

Preah Vihear (Khmer: ក្រុងព្រះវិហារ) is the capital of Preah Vihear province in northern Cambodia. Phnom Tbeng Meanchey is the mountain rising to 600m 5 km south-west of Tbeng Meanchey town.

== Climate ==
Climate data for Preah Vihear (1982–2024)
Month	Jan	Feb	Mar	Apr	May	Jun	Jul	Aug	Sep	Oct	Nov	Dec	Year
Mean daily maximum °C (°F)	31.9 (89.4)	32.0 (89.6)	33.6 (92.5)	34.4 (93.9)	34.7 (94.5)	33.9 (93.0)	33.7 (92.7)	32.9 (91.2)	32.4 (90.3)	32.0 (89.6)	31.9 (89.4)	31.4 (88.5)	32.9 (91.2)
Mean daily minimum °C (°F)	18.0 (64.4)	19.3 (66.7)	20.9 (69.6)	21.4 (70.5)	22.6 (72.7)	22.4 (72.3)	22.0 (71.6)	22.1 (71.8)	22.3 (72.1)	21.5 (70.7)	20.3 (68.5)	18.5 (65.3)	20.9 (69.7)
Average precipitation mm (inches)	4.6 (0.18)	20.4 (0.80)	67.3 (2.65)	92.4 (3.64)	186.3 (7.33)	204.6 (8.06)	192.4 (7.57)	256.4 (10.09)	204.3 (8.04)	196.9 (7.75)	69.3 (2.73)	12.1 (0.48)	1,507 (59.32)
Source: World Meteorological Organization
