= Preah Vihear province =

Province of Cambodia

Preah Vihear Province ខេត្តព្រះវិហារ
- Province

Khmer transcription(s)
  - Khmer: ខេត្តព្រះវិហារ
  - UNGEGN: Khaet Preăh Vĭhia
  - ALA-LC: Khett Braḥ Vihār
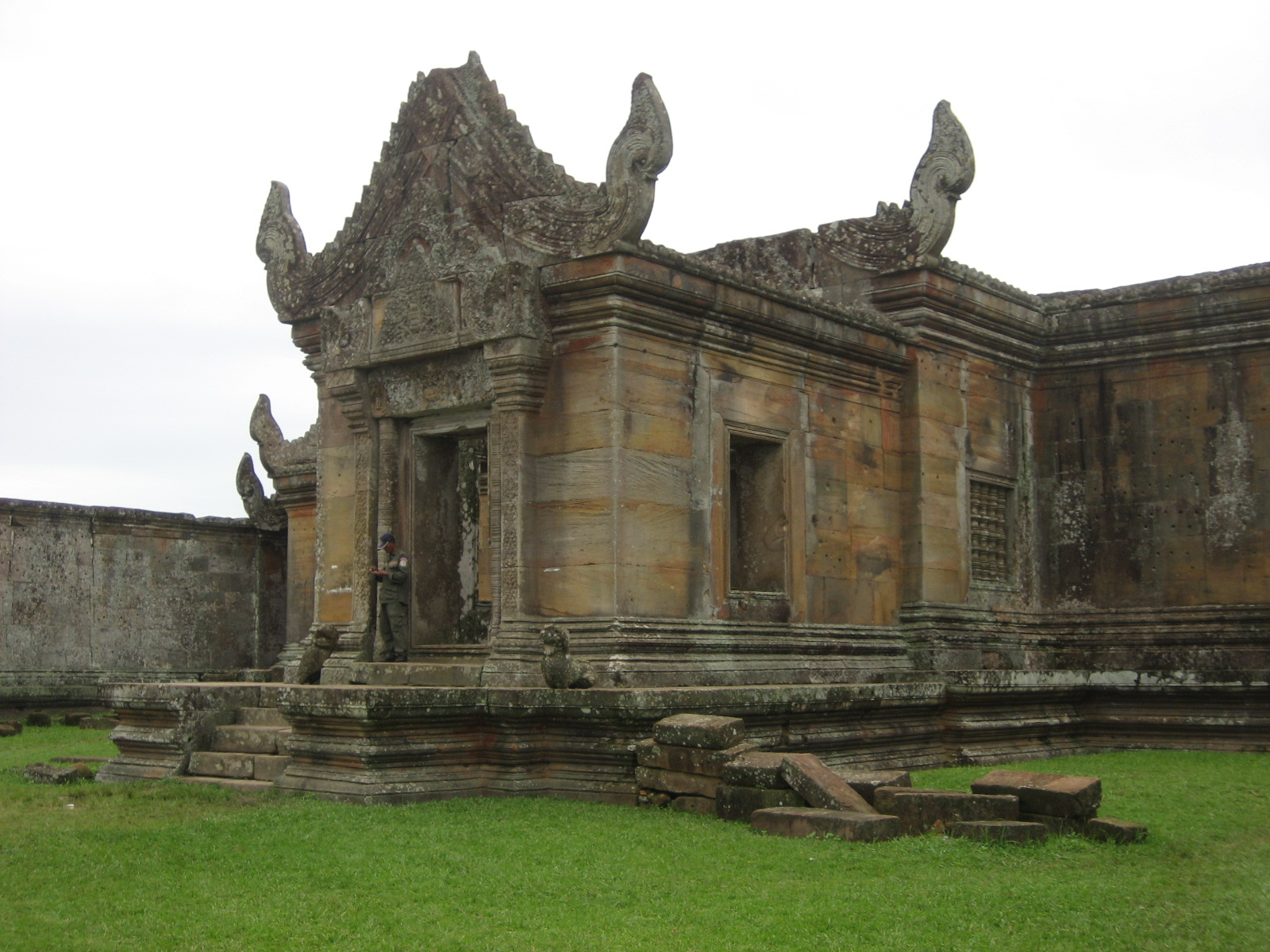
- Preah Vihear, the temple from which the province received its name

- Seal

- Map of Cambodia highlighting Preah Vihear
- Coordinates: 13°47′N 104°58′E
- Country: Cambodia
- ICJ ruling: 15 June 1962
- Provincial status: 22 July 1964
- Named for: Preah Vihear
- Capital: Preah Vihear

Government
  - Governor: Kim Rithy (CPP)
  - National Assembly: 1 / 125

Area
  - Total: 13,788 km^{2} (5,324 sq mi)
  - Rank: 3rd

Population (2024)
  - Total: ▼249,973
  - Rank: 18th
  - Density: 18/km^{2} (47/sq mi)
  - Rank: 22nd
- Time zone: UTC+7 (ICT)
- Dialing code: +855
- ISO 3166 code: KH-13
- Website: www.preahvihear.gov.kh

Preah Vihear Province (Khmer: ខេត្តព្រះវិហារ, Khaet Preăh Vĭhia, [preah ʋihiə]; lit. 'sacred sanctuary') is a province (khaet) of Cambodia. It borders the provinces of Oddar Meanchey and Siem Reap to the west, Kampong Thom to the south and Stung Treng to the east. Its northern boundary forms part of Cambodia's international border with Thailand and Laos. Its capital is Preah Vihear.

Preah Vihear is one of the nine provinces that are part of the Tonle Sap Biosphere Reserve.

On 15 April 2016, Preah Vihear recorded a temperature of 42.6 °C (108.7 °F), which is the highest temperature to have ever been recorded in Cambodia.

== Administrative divisions ==
The province is divided into seven districts and one municipality, further divided into 51 communes.

ISO code	District	Khmer
13-01	Chey Saen	ស្រុកជ័យសែន
13-02	Chhaeb	ស្រុកឆែប
13-03	Choam Khsant	ស្រុកជាំក្សាន្ត
13-04	Kuleaen	ស្រុកគូលែន
13-05	Rovieng	ស្រុករវៀង
13-06	Sangkom Thmei	ស្រុកសង្គមថ្មី
13-07	Tbaeng Meanchey	ស្រុកត្បែងមានជ័យ
13-08	Preah Vihear Municipality	ក្រុងព្រះវិហារ

== Sites ==
- Koh Ker complex: Koh Ker was once the capital city of Khmer Empire
- Bakan or Preah Khan Kompong Svay complex: 105 kilometres southwest of the provincial town, built under the reign of King Suryavarman I (1002–1050)
- Noreay Temples: five 7th-century temples made of Sandstone, laterite and brick, 32 kilometres northeast of the town.
- Phnom Pralean temple: a temple built to worship Brahmanism, on top of a 180 metres hill
- Neak Buos temple: 75 kilometres north of Tbaeng Meanchey
- Krapum Chhouk temple: built in the 10th century in laterite and stone, 45 kilometres south of Tbaeng Meanchey
- Kork Beng temple: a ruined laterite and sandstone temple built between 936 and 951 by a commander named Kork on the order of King Jayavarman IV
- Wat Peung Preah Ko: a place of worship in natural surroundings believed to possess strong supernatural powers.
- Preah Vihear: built in the 12th century, located between Thailand and Cambodia. It was listed as World Heritage Site in 2008.

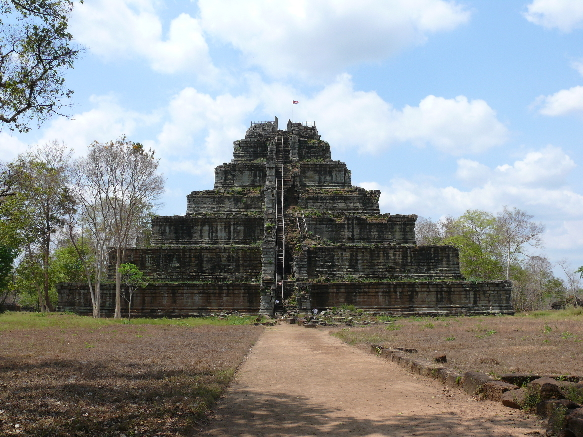
Koh Ker

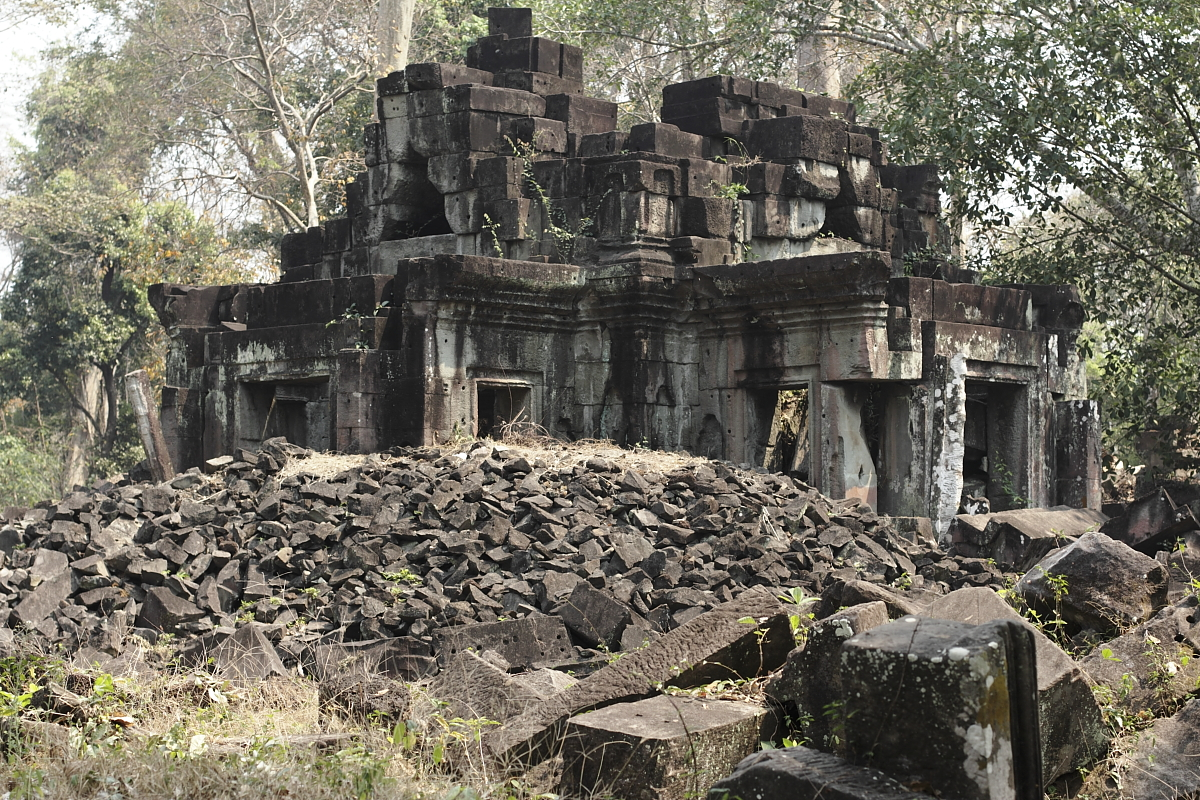
Preah Khan Kampong Svay

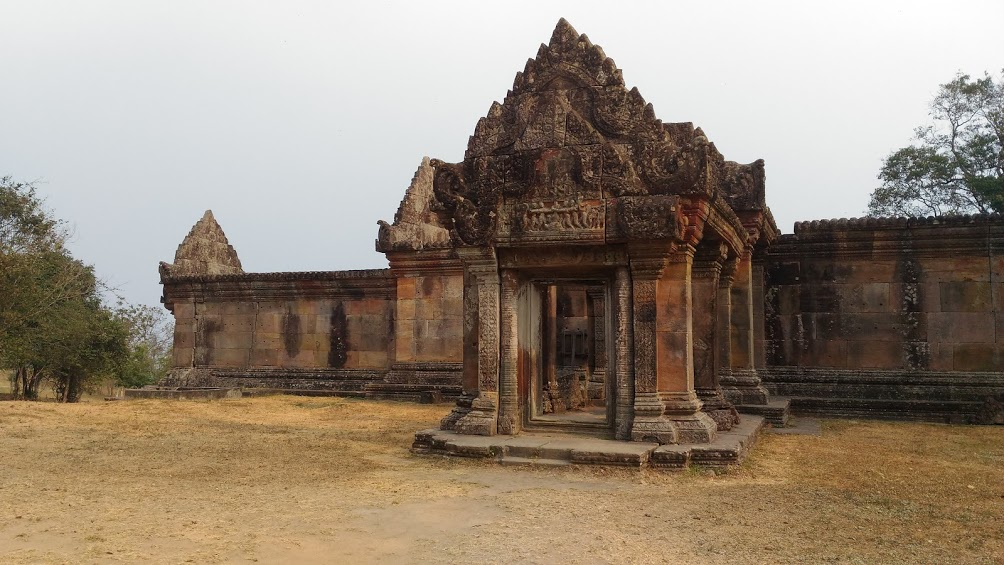
Preah Vihear

== Environment ==
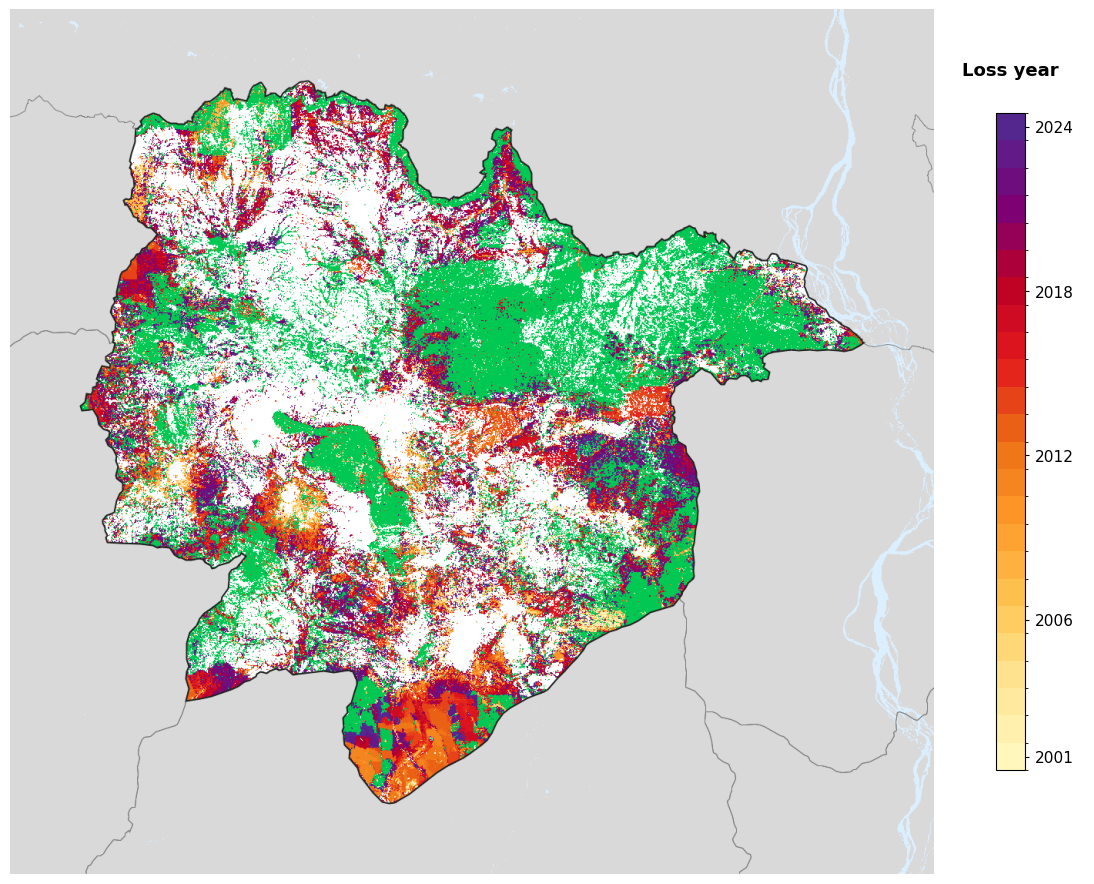
Tree-cover loss year in Preah Vihear, 2001-2024, from the Global Forest Change dataset.

The Prey Lang Wildlife Sanctuary spans multiple provinces including Preah Vihear, and the sanctuary landscape has been used for a registered REDD+ project under Japan’s Joint Crediting Mechanism involving Conservation International’s Cambodia programme.
