= Jask Rural District =

Rural district in Hormozgan province, Iran

Jask Rural District Persian: دهستان جاسك
- Rural District
- Location within Iran
- Coordinates: 25°54′07″N 57°42′37″E
- Country: Iran
- Province: Hormozgan
- County: Jask
- District: Central
- Capital: Jask-e Kohneh

Population (2016)
  - Total: 8,382
- Time zone: UTC+3:30 (IRST)

Jask Rural District (Persian: دهستان جاسك) is in the Central District of Jask County, Hormozgan province, Iran. Its capital is the village of Jask-e Kohneh.

== Demographics ==
=== Population ===
At the time of the 2006 National Census, the rural district's population was 6,392 in 1,239 households. There were 7,810 inhabitants in 1,708 households at the following census of 2011. The 2016 census measured the population of the rural district as 8,382 in 2,103 households. The most populous of its 24 villages was Bahal, with 1,775 people.
