= Khem Veasna =

Cambodian politician (born 1965)

- ខឹម វាសនា
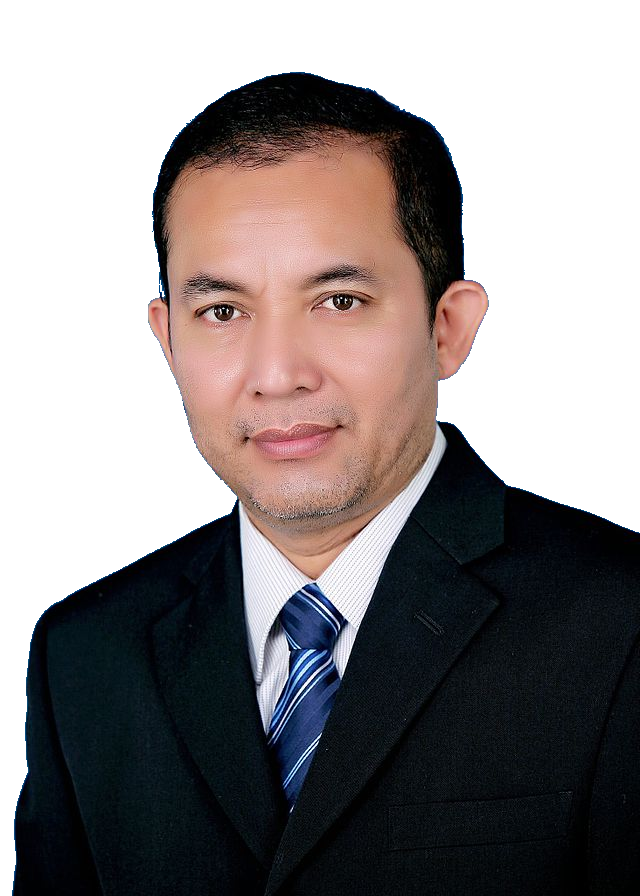

President of the League for Democracy Party
- Incumbent
- Assumed office 26 June 2006
- Preceded by: Position established

Member of Parliament for Prey Veng
- In office 4 October 2003 – 27 July 2008

Personal details
- Born: 11 December 1965 (age 60) Kanhchriech District, Prey Veng Province, Cambodia
- Party: League for Democracy Party
- Occupation: Businessman
- Website: Khem Veasna

Khem Veasna (Khmer: ខឹម វាសនា [kʰəm ʋiəsnaː]; born 11 December 1965) is a Cambodian politician, the founder of the League for Democracy Party (LDP). He currently serves as the president of the LDP.

Formerly, he was a member of the Sam Rainsy Party, and was listed as a nominee since 1998 but not elected until the 2003 National Assembly Election, when he became a member of the National Assembly for Prey Veng province. In 2005, he formed the LDP.

== In politics: 1998–present ==
In his engagement as a politician, initially, Veasna was a member of the Sam Rainsy Party, listed as a nominee since 1998 but not elected. Later, in 2003 he was elected as a representative for Prey Veng Province. As a representative of the Sam Rainsy Party, he held two offices, one in Ba Phnum District and another in Me Sang District. At that time he was 38 years old. He had started doing politics since before 1998, but he started understanding how to do it in the middle of second term.

Later, in 2005 he formed a political party called the League for Democracy Party. The party has been growing since it was founded in 2005 and has placed candidates in 844 communes – more than half of the Kingdom's total 1,646 – in the 2017 commune elections.

=== In the Sam Rainsy Party ===
Veasna was expelled from a program run by the National Democratic Institute due to a statement which was perceived as an insult to the monarchy, and as a potential violation of the Cambodian constitution. Veasna received criticism from his party members, including Sam Rainsy, who issued a statement of condemnation. Veasna defended himself saying that he did not mean to attack the monarchy, but was simply reciting historical facts.

=== The League for Democracy Party ===
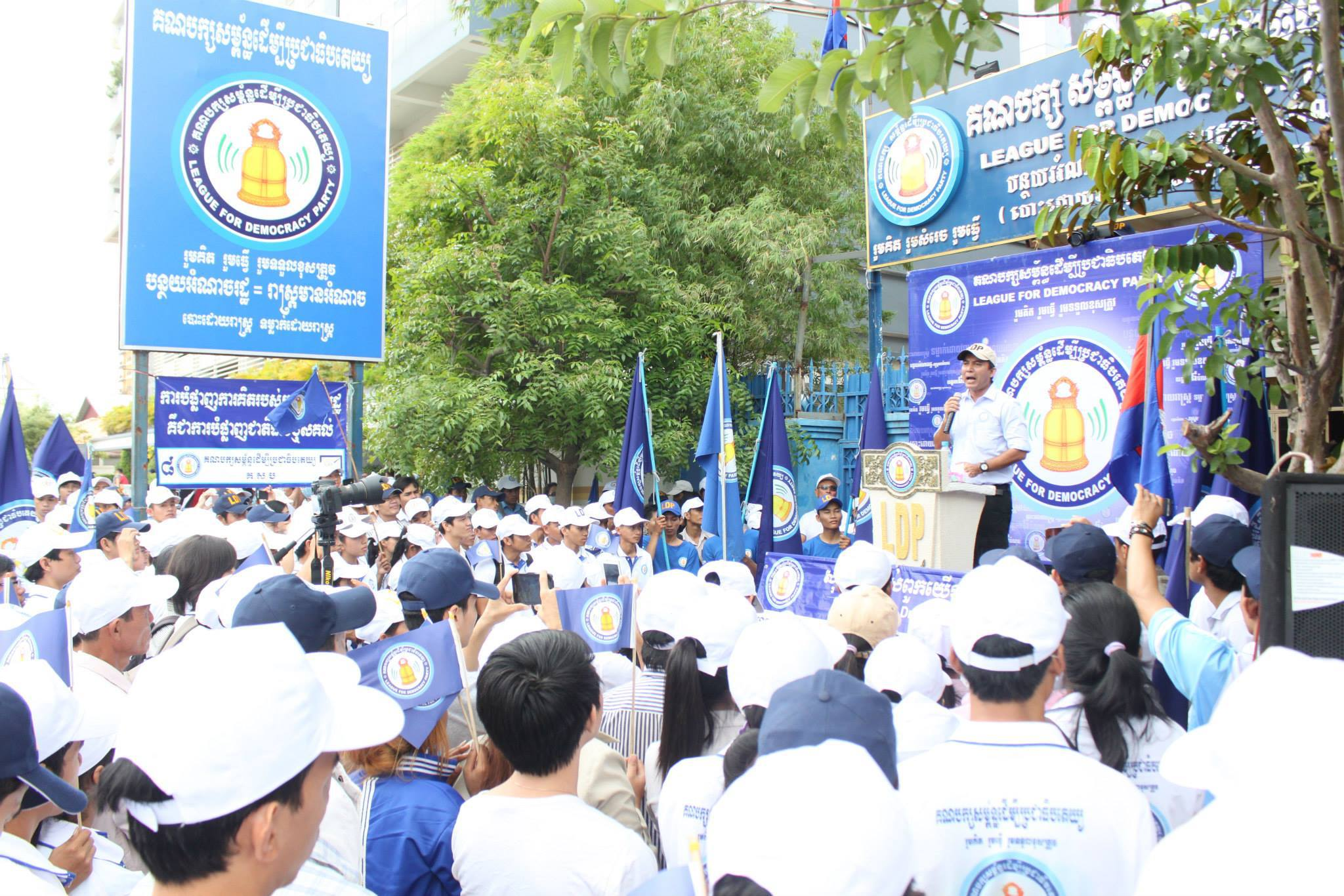
Veasna delivering a speech at central headquarter in Phnom Penh City during the campaign in July 2013

On 15 July 2005, the League For Democracy Party (LDP) was formed. It was registered and officially recognized by the announcement of the Ministry of Interior in 2006 and Veasna has served as its president since although he wants to limit the prime minister terms in Cambodia.

== Cult accusations ==
In 2022, Veasna began claiming that a “black hole” had formed in his spine and that it was transmitting messages to him about an upcoming global flood that would destroy the whole world except for his farm in Cambodia. He also referred to himself as a Brahma. Photos posted on his social media accounts showed large crowds of people gathered at his farm, including some sleeping in tents.

The Cambodian government reported that migrant workers in other countries such as South Korea had been quitting their jobs to return to Cambodia because of Veasna's preaching. The government began issuing statements trying to discourage people from doing this. Some local residents have welcomed the influx of Veasna's followers as good for business, while others have expressed frustration and accused the crowds of engaging in disorderly conduct and open defecation.
