= Chok Chey =

- Village
- Location within Cambodia
- Coordinates: 11°22′19″N 105°19′49″E
- Country: Cambodia
- Province: Prey Veng Province

Population
  - Total: About 1,400

Chok Chey is a village in the Prey Veng Province of Cambodia. It is situated 16 km south of Prey Veng City.

The main industry in the village is rice farming.

During flood season, the flood channel from the village joins up with the Mekong River, which Chok Chey is connected to by a lake 4 km from the village itself. Though this lake only connects to the Mekong in flood season.

It is home to approximately 1,400 people.

Buses pass through Chok Chey twice daily, en route from Prey Veng on its way to Phnom Penh, the nation's capital. The buses are not scheduled to stop in Chok Chey, but it can be arranged. The locals themselves prefer to travel by agricultural tractor, and trucks, assembled locally, to the North-east of Prey Veng, which are specifically designed for the rugged conditions of the area. Push Bikes are also a popular means of transport.
