= Al-Serkal Mosque =

Mosque in Phnom Penh, Cambodia

- វិហារឥស្លាមអាល់សឺកាល់
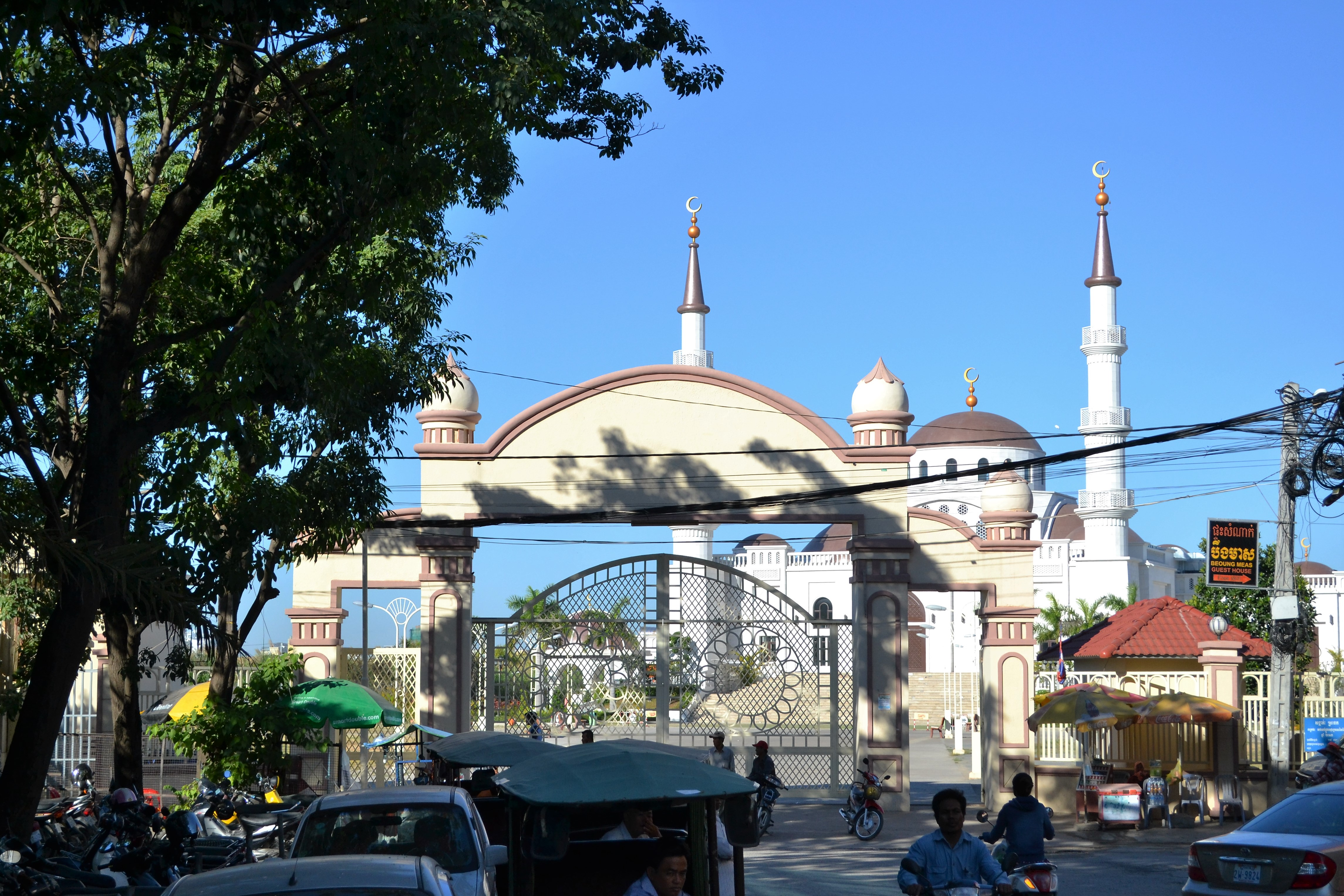

- Location of the mosque in Cambodia

Religion
- Affiliation: Sunni Islam
- Ecclesiastical or organizational status: Mosque
- Status: Active

Location
- Location: Phnom Penh
- Country: Cambodia
- Interactive map of Al-Serkal Mosque
- Coordinates: 11°34′45.57″N 104°54′50.11″E

Architecture
- Architect: Nadan Engineering Consultancy
- Type: Mosque
- Style: Ottoman
- Completed: 1968 (original); 2014 (rebuild)
- Demolished: 2012 (original)

Specifications
- Dome: 1
- Minaret: 2

The Al-Serkal Mosque (Khmer: វិហារឥស្លាមអាល់សឺកាល់) is the main mosque in Phnom Penh, the capital of Cambodia.

== Overview ==
It was a gift from the Al Serkal family, an Emiratee family, and was opened in 1968. It is situated north of the town, near the Boeung Kak lake, which is now dry. The original mosque was demolished in 2012 and a new building, a gift of the United Arab Emirates, replaced the original mosque, and it was opened in 2014.

== Gallery ==
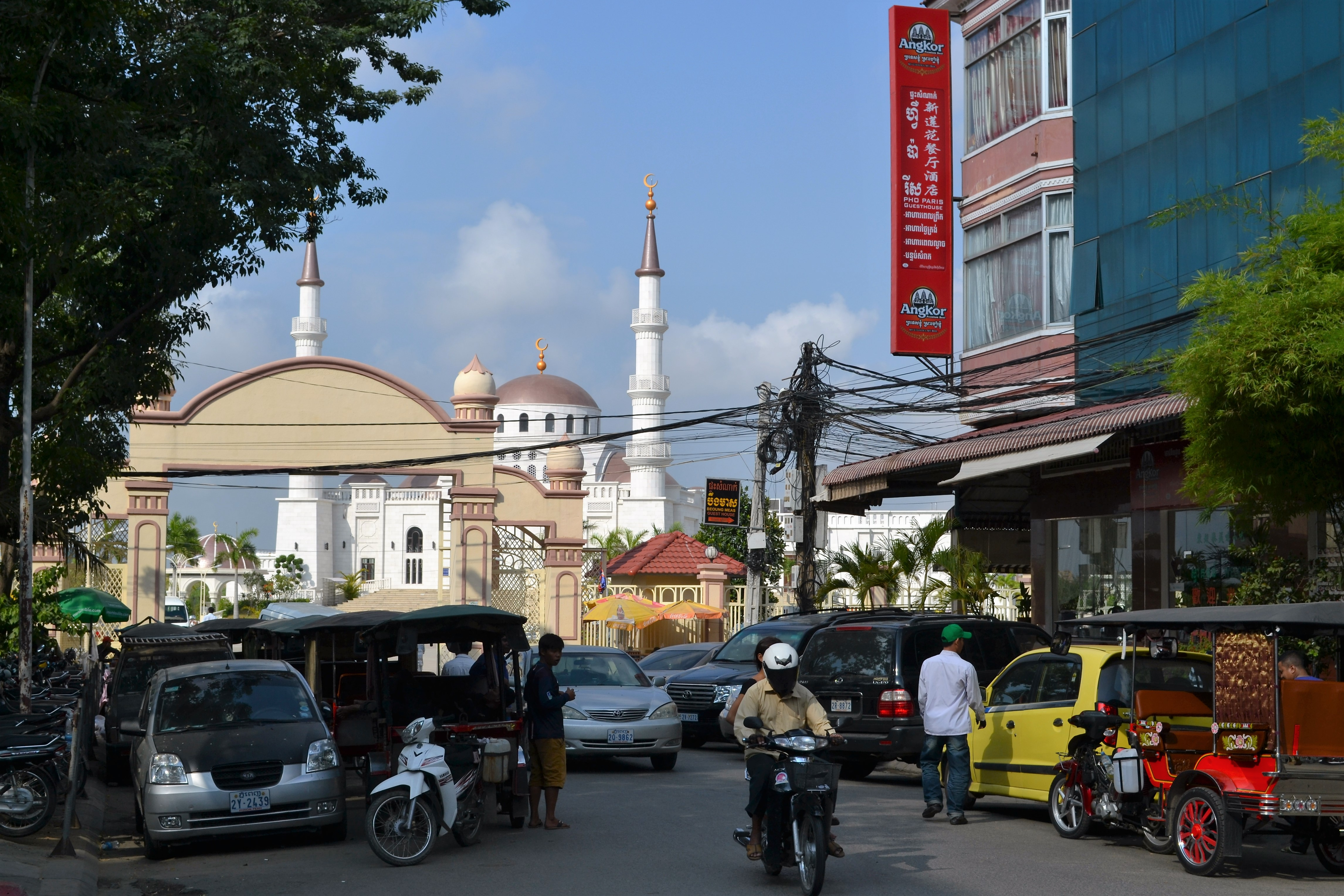
The mosque as seeing from the street

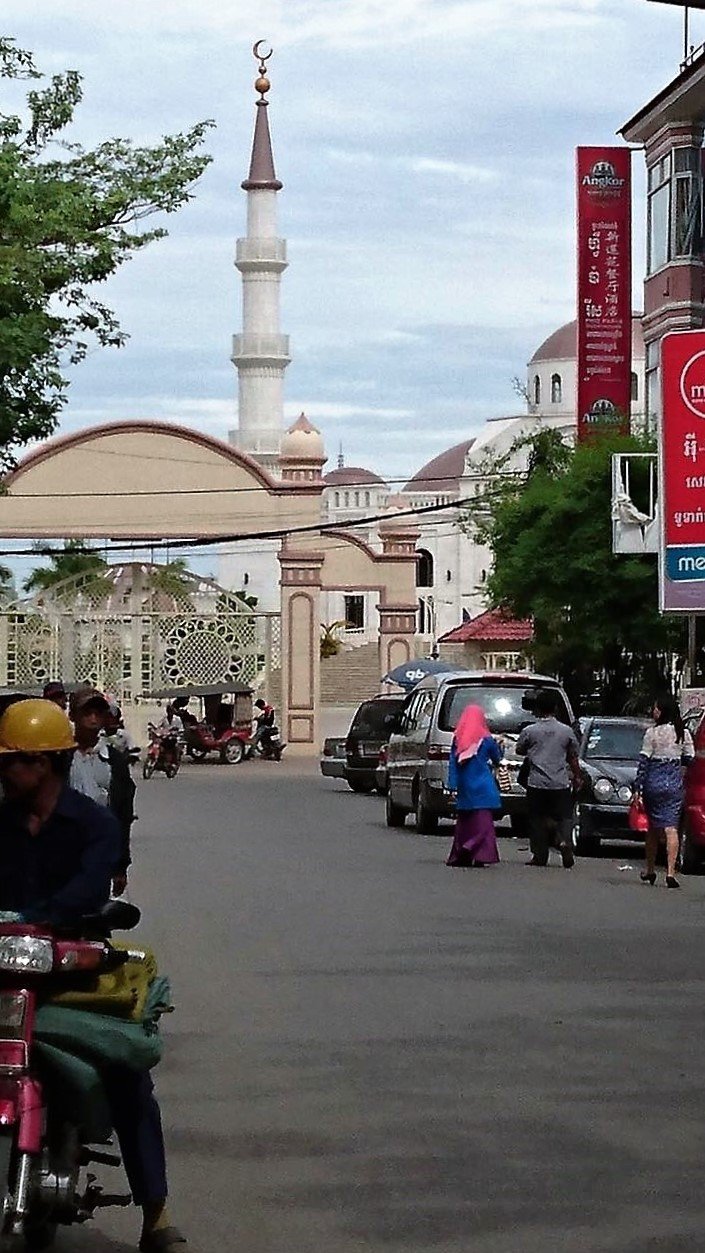
One of the minarets as seen from the street

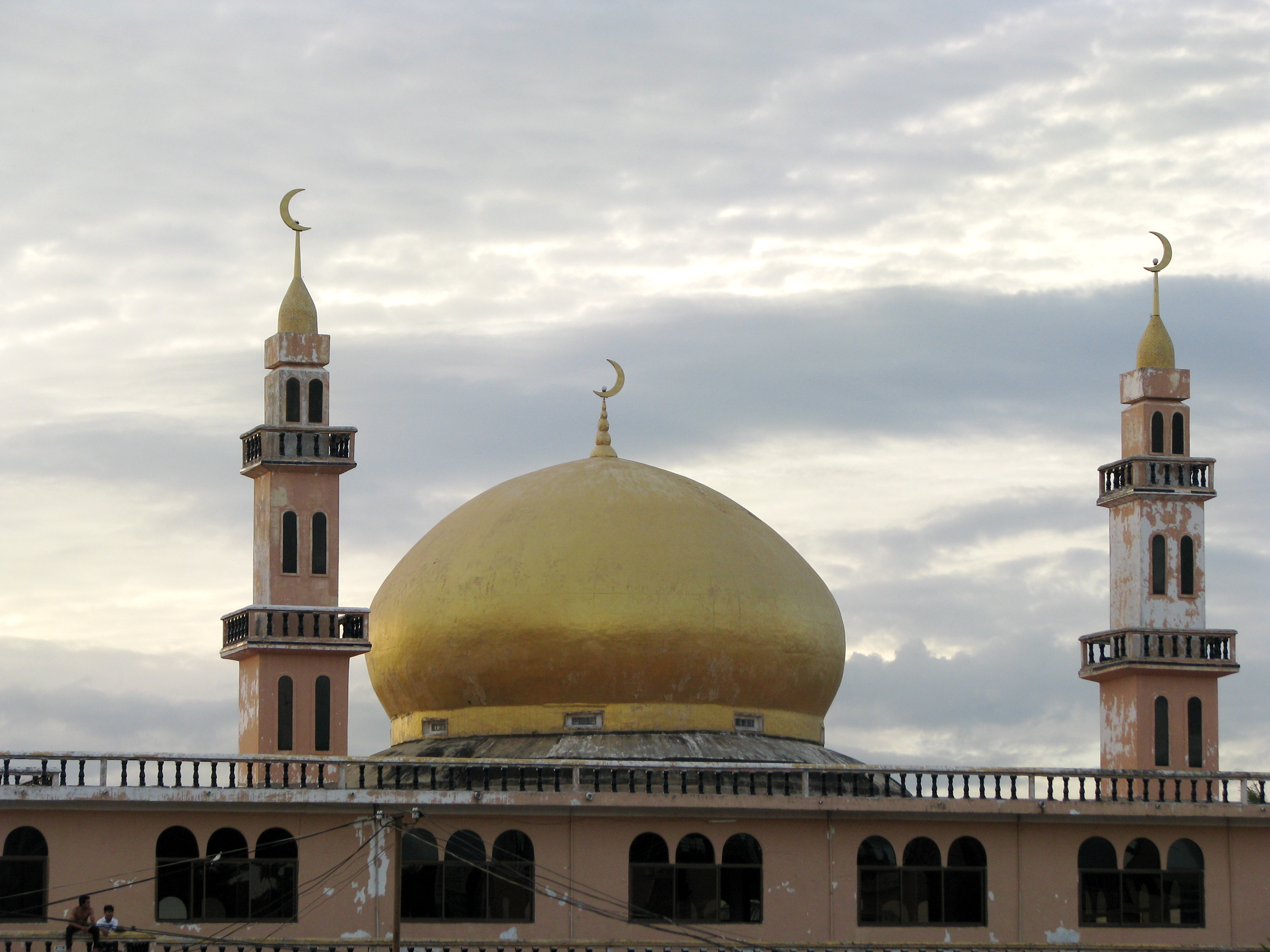
The original mosque in 2008, demolished in 2012

== See also ==
- Islam in Cambodia
- List of mosques in Cambodia
- Foreign relations of Cambodia
