= Religion in Cambodia =

Religion in Cambodia (2024 census)
1. Buddhism (official) (96.5%)
2. Islam (2.60%)
3. Christianity (0.30%)
4. Other religions (0.50%)

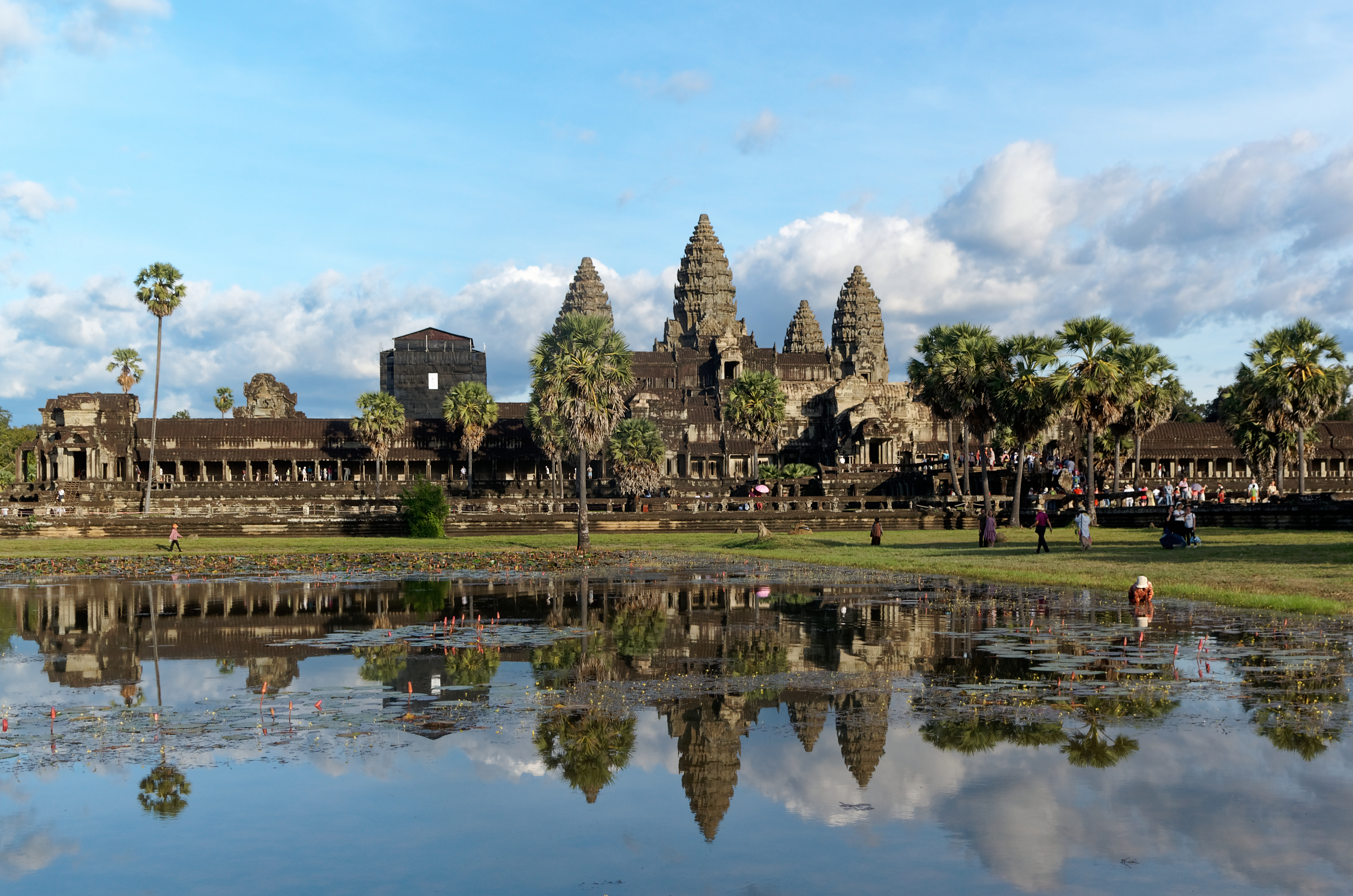
Angkor Wat is a Hindu-Buddhist temple complex and the largest religious structure in the world.

Buddhism is the state religion of Cambodia. Approximately 97% of Cambodia's population follows Theravada Buddhism, with Islam, Christianity, and tribal animism as well as Baha’i faith making up the bulk of the small remainder. The wat (Buddhist monastery) and sangha (monkhood), together with essential Buddhist doctrines such as rebirth and the accumulation of merit, are at the centre of religious life.

According to 2024 national census, 96.5% of Cambodia's population was Buddhist, 2.6% Muslim, 0.3% Christian and 0.5% Other.

According to the Pew Research Center in 2010, 96.9% of Cambodia's population was Buddhist, 2.0% Muslim, 0.4% Christian, and 0.7% folk religion and non religious.

== Census results ==
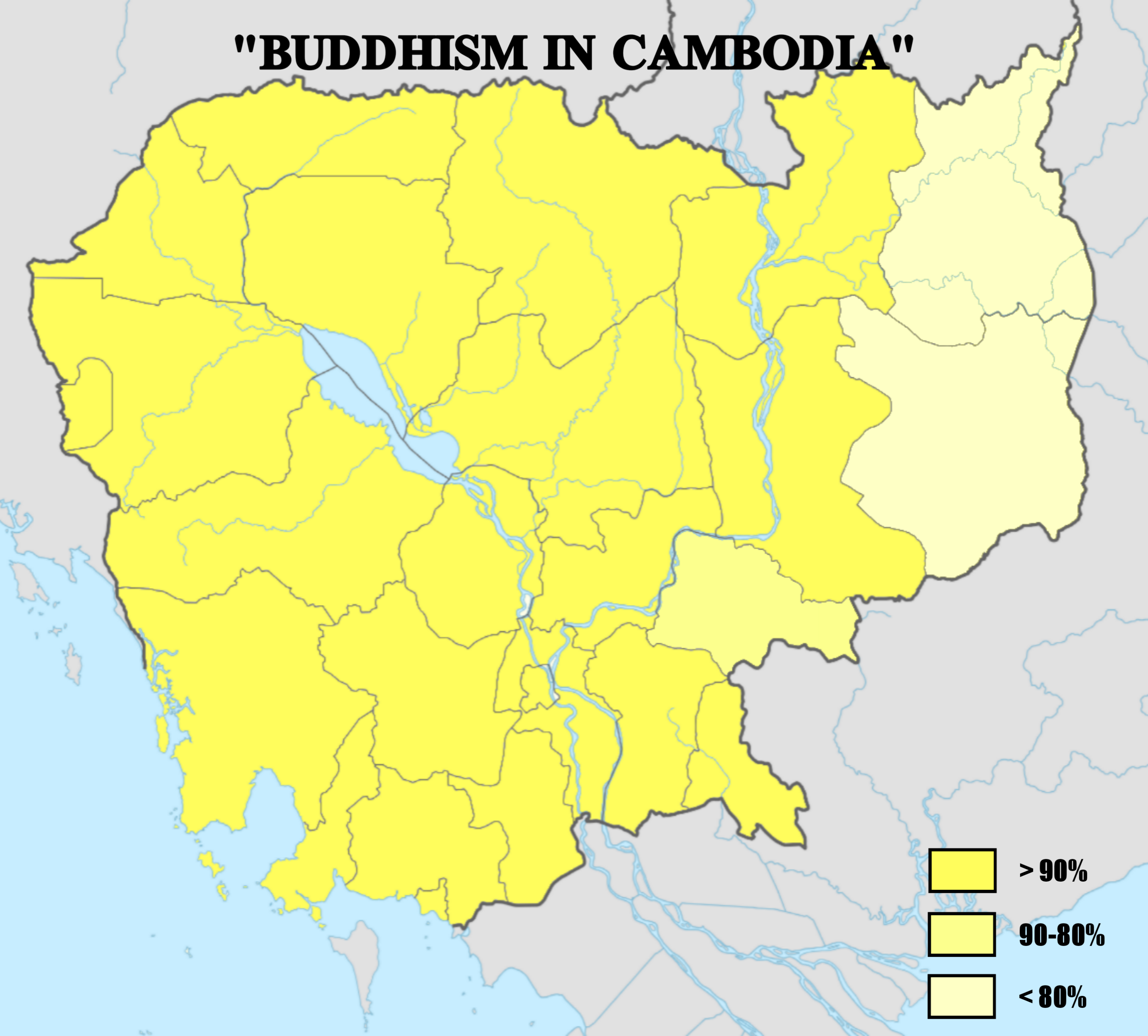
Buddhist by province

The predominant religion in Cambodia is Buddhism (97%), followed by Islam (2%), other religions (0.8%), and Christianity (0.2%). The category of "Others" mainly refers to the local religious system of the highland tribal groups and a few minority religious groups from other countries. The distribution of the population by religion was more or less the same in 2008 and 2019:

Province	Buddhism		Islam		Christianity		Others	
Province	2008	2019	2008	2019	2008	2019	2008	2019
Banteay Meanchey	99.2%	99.3%	0.5%	0.4%	0.3%	0.2%	0.0%	0.0%
Battambang	98.3%	98.3%	1.3%	1.4%	0.3%	0.3%	0.0%	0.0%
Kampong Cham	97.6%	97.6%	2.3%	2.3%	0.1%	0.1%	0.0%	0.0%
Kampong Chhnang	94.7%	93.1%	4.2%	5.8%	0.4%	0.3%	0.7%	0.9%
Kampong Speu	99.7%	99.8%	0.1%	0.1%	0.2%	0.1%	0.0%	0.0%
Kampong Thom	99.0%	98.6%	0.6%	1.0%	0.4%	0.3%	0.0%	0.0%
Kampot	97.1%	96.9%	2.7%	2.8%	0.2%	0.2%	0.0%	0.0%
Kandal	98.0%	98.3%	1.2%	1.2%	0.7%	0.4%	0.1%	0.1%
Koh Kong	95.2%	95.1%	4.6%	4.6%	0.2%	0.2%	0.0%	0.0%
Kratié	94.0%	93.1%	5.6%	6.6%	0.4%	0.2%	0.1%	0.1%
Mondulkiri	54.7%	70.4%	5.5%	4.4%	4.4%	4.0%	35.5%	21.2%
Phnom Penh	97.5%	97.8%	1.5%	1.6%	0.8%	0.5%	0.1%	0.1%
Preah Vihear	99.4%	99.1%	0.3%	0.5%	0.3%	0.3%	0.0%	0.0%
Prey Veng	99.5%	99.5%	0.1%	0.2%	0.2%	0.3%	0.1%	0.0%
Pursat	97.4%	96.9%	2.4%	3.0%	0.2%	0.1%	0.0%	0.0%
Ratanakiri	49.3%	73.4%	1.3%	1.3%	2.3%	2.1%	47.2%	23.2%
Siem Reap	99.7%	99.3%	0.2%	0.2%	0.1%	0.4%	0.0%	0.1%
Preah Sihanouk	94.5%	96.2%	4.7%	3.6%	0.7%	0.2%	0.1%	0.0%
Stung Treng	96.1%	93.6%	1.3%	4.7%	0.4%	0.4%	2.2%	1.3%
Svay Rieng	99.7%	99.8%	0.1%	0.1%	0.2%	0.1%	0.0%	0.1%
Takéo	99.1%	99.2%	0.7%	0.6%	0.2%	0.1%	0.0%	0.0%
Oddar Meanchey	99.8%	99.5%	0.1%	0.2%	0.1%	0.3%	0.0%	0.0%
Kep	98.7%	97.5%	1.2%	1.7%	0.0%	0.7%	0.0%	0.1%
Pailin	99.1%	98.3%	0.7%	1.0%	0.2%	0.7%	0.0%	0.0%
Tboung Khmum	88.9%	88.1%	11.0%	11.8%	0.1%	0.1%	0.0%	0.0%
Total	96.9%	97.1%	1.9%	2.0%	0.4%	0.3%	0.8%	0.5%

== Buddhism ==
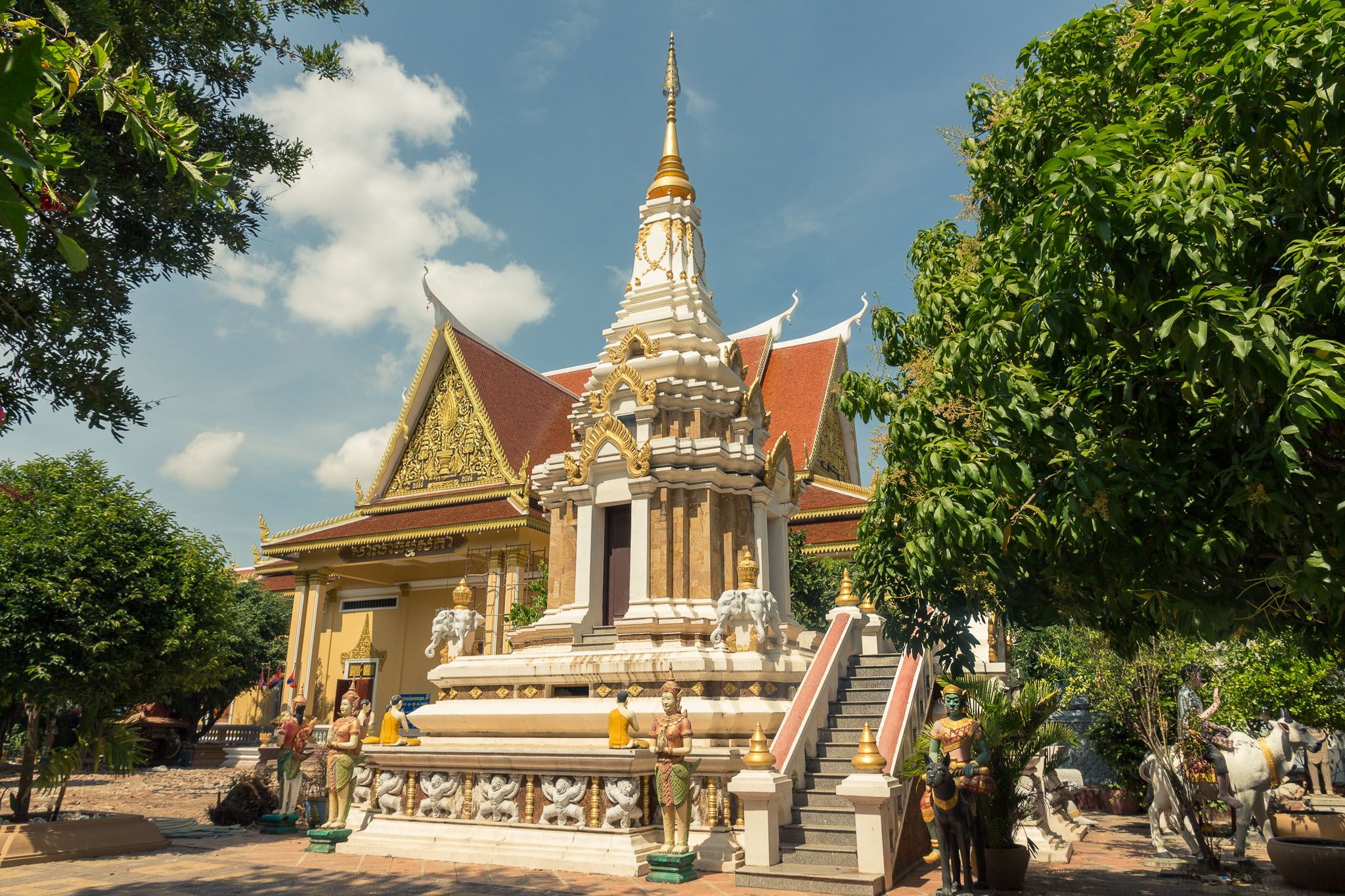
Wat Botum in Phnom Penh

Buddhism in Cambodia or Khmer Buddhism (Khmer: ព្រះពុទ្ធសាសនាបែបខ្មែរ) has existed since at least the 3rd century. In its earliest form it was a type of Mahāyāna Buddhism. Theravada Buddhism has existed in Cambodia since at least the 5th century AD, with some sources placing its origin as early as the 3rd century BC. Theravada Buddhism has been the Cambodian state religion since the 13th century AD (excepting the Khmer Rouge period), and is currently estimated to be the religion of 96.5% of the total population.

The history of Buddhism in Cambodia spans nearly two thousand years, across a number of successive kingdoms and empires. Buddhism entered Cambodia through two different streams. In later history, a second stream of Buddhism entered Khmer culture during the Angkor empire when Cambodia absorbed the various Buddhist traditions of the Mon kingdoms of Dvaravati and Haripunchai.

For the thousand years of Khmer history, Cambodia was ruled by a series of Mahayana with an occasional Theravada Buddhist king, such as Jayavarman I of Funan, and Suryvarman I. A variety of Buddhist traditions co-existed throughout Cambodian lands, under the Mahayana Buddhist kings and the neighboring Mon-Theravada kingdoms. Angkor Wat, the largest Hindu temple in Siem Reap, was converted into a Mahayana Buddhist temple during the reign of King Jayavarman VII in the 12th century and again into a thereveda Buddhist temple during the reign of King Ang Chan I in the 16th century (Longvek Era).

== Islam ==
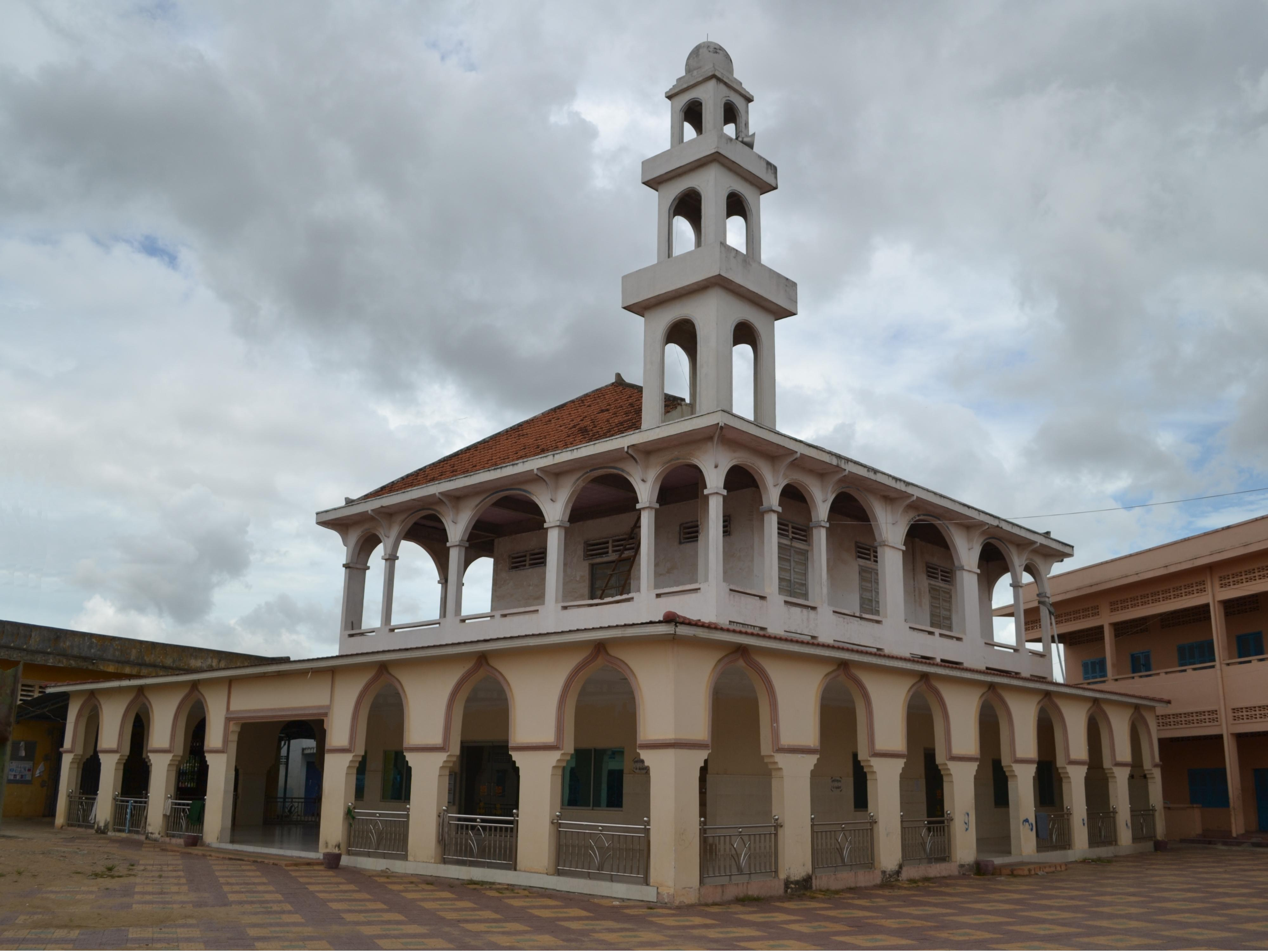
Nur ul-Ihsan Mosque in Phnom Penh was the oldest mosque in Cambodia.

Muslim traders along the main trade-route between Western Asia through Āryāvarta were responsible for the introduction of Islam to Cambodia around 12th to 17th centuries AD. The religion was then further spread by the Chams and finally consolidated by the expansion of the territories of converted rulers and their communities. The Chams have their own mosques. In 1962, there were about 100 mosques in the country. Nur ul-Ihsan Mosque in Phnom Penh is the oldest mosque in Cambodia, it was built in 1813, and is a relic of the history of Islam in Cambodia.

Islam also flourished among Khmer people, in Kwan village, Kampong Speu, Muslims thrived with most of the converts from Buddhism. The propagator of Islam in the village is Abdul Amit, a Cham farmer.

== Christianity ==
The first known Christian mission in Cambodia was undertaken by Gaspar da Cruz, a Portuguese member of the Dominican Order, in 1555-1556. According to his own account, the enterprise was a complete failure; he found the country run by a "Bramene" king and "Bramene" officials, and discovered that "the Bramenes are the most difficult people to convert". He felt that no one would dare to convert without the King's permission, and left the country in disappointment, not having "baptized more than one gentile whom I left in the grave".

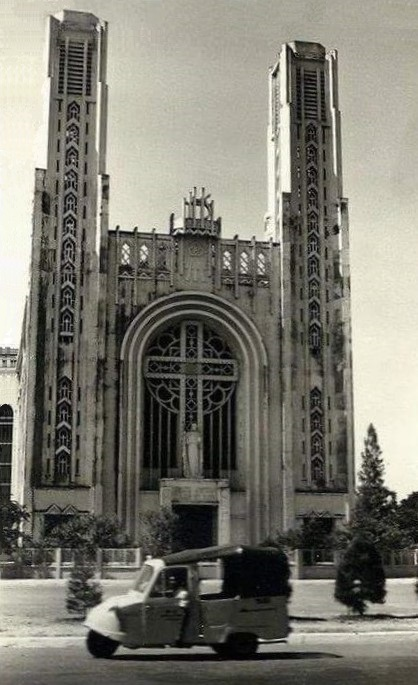
Cathedral of Phnom Penh, built during the French colonial period

Despite the French colonization in the 19th century, Christianity made little impact in the country. In 1972 there were probably about 20,000 Christians in Cambodia, most of whom were Catholics. Before the repatriation of the Vietnamese in 1970 and 1971, possibly as many as 62,000 Christians lived in Cambodia. According to Vatican statistics, in 1953, members of the Catholic Church in Cambodia numbered 120,000, making it at the time, the second largest religion. Estimates indicate that about 50,000 Catholics were Vietnamese.

Many of the Catholics remaining in Cambodia in 1972 were Europeans – chiefly French; and still, among Catholic Cambodians are whites and Eurasians of French descent. Steinberg reported, also in 1953, that an American Unitarian mission maintained a teacher-training school in Phnom Penh, and Baptist missions functioned in Battambang and Siem Reap provinces.

There are around 75,000 Catholics in Cambodia which represents 0.5% of the total population. There are no dioceses, but there are three territorial jurisdictions - one Apostolic Vicariate and two Apostolic Prefectures.

Until the late 19th century, there were no Protestant missions to Cambodia. A Christian and Missionary Alliance mission was founded in Cambodia in 1923; by 1962 the mission had converted about 2,000 people.

American Protestant missionary activity increased in Cambodia, especially among some of the hill tribes and among the Cham, after the establishment of the Khmer Republic. The 1962 census, which reported 2,000 Protestants in Cambodia, remains the most recent statistic for the group. In 1982 French geographer Jean Delvert reported that three Christian villages existed in Cambodia, but he gave no indication of the size, location, or type of any of them. Observers reported that in 1980 there were more registered Khmer Christians among the refugees in camps in Thailand than in all of Cambodia before 1970. Kiernan notes that, until June 1980, five weekly Protestant services were held in Phnom Penh by a Khmer pastor, but that they had been reduced to a weekly service after police harassment. His estimates suggest that in 1987 the Christian community in Cambodia had shrunk to only a few thousand members.

Various Protestant denominations have reported marked growth since the 1990s, especially in cities.

Multiple western restorationist groups have also attempted to proselytise in Cambodia. The president of the Church of Jesus Christ of Latter-Day Saints commonly known as the Mormon Church, Gordon B. Hinckley, officially introduced missionary work to Cambodia on May 29, 1996. This church has 31 congregations (27 Khmer language and three Vietnamese language, and one international). Jehovah’s Witnesses are also present in Cambodia since 1990 and opened their third Kingdom Hall in 2015.

== Baháʼí Faith ==
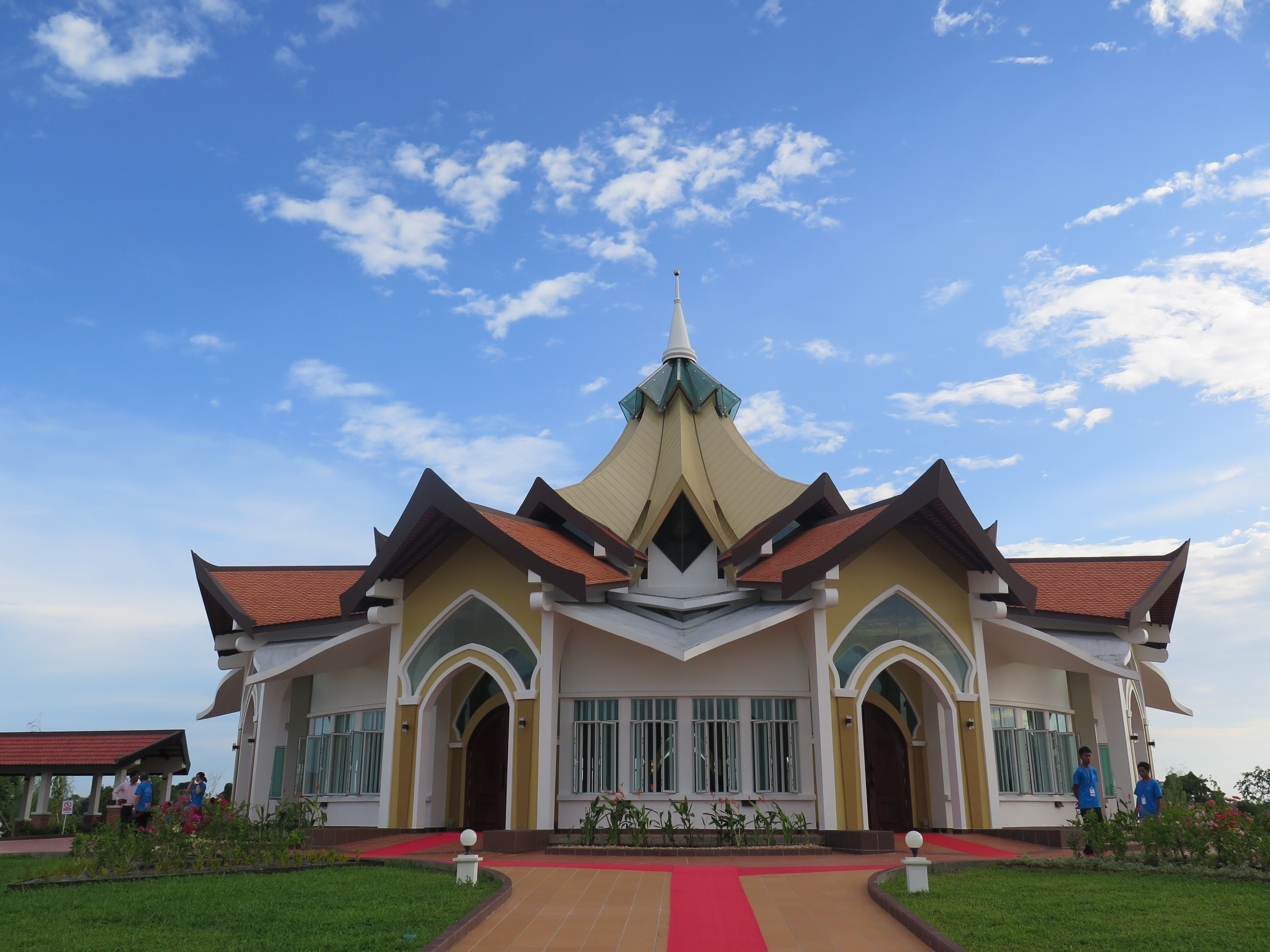
Bahá'í House of Worship in Battambang

The introduction of the Baháʼí Faith in Cambodia first occurred in 1920, with the arrival of Hippolyte Dreyfus-Barney in Phnom Penh at the behest of 'Abdu'l-Bahá. After sporadic visits from travelling teachers throughout the first half of the 20th century, the first Baháʼí group in Cambodia was established in that city in 1956. By 1963, Baháʼís were known to reside in Phnom Penh, Battambang, Siem Reap and Sihanoukville, with a functioning Spiritual Assembly present in Phnom Penh.

During the rule of the Khmer Rouge in the late 1970s, the Baháʼís of Cambodia became isolated from the outside world. Many of them joined with the flood of refugees that dispersed around the world following the fall of the Khmer Rouge, resettling in places such as Canada and the United States, where special efforts were made to contact them and incorporate them into local Baháʼí community life. Baháʼís in Thailand and other countries reached out to the Cambodian refugees living in camps on the Thai-Cambodian border; this eventually led to the growth of Baháʼí communities there, including the establishment of Spiritual Assemblies.

The Baháʼí community has recently seen a return to growth, especially in the city of Battambang. The city hosted one of 41 Baháʼí regional conferences worldwide in 2009, which attracted over 2,000 participants. Two regional youth conferences occurred in Cambodia in 2013, including one in Battambang and one in Kampong Thom.

In 2012, the Universal House of Justice announced plans to establish a local Baháʼí House of Worship in Battambang. Its design was unveiled in July 2015, with the groundbreaking following in November. The House of Worship—the first Bahá'í House of Worship to serve a single locality—was dedicated in a ceremony in September 2017, attended by 2,500 people.

== Indigenous beliefs ==
Highland tribal groups, most with their own local religious systems. These were arguably the earliest religious people in Cambodia. By the late first millennium BCE and early first millennium CE, Buddhism and Hinduism had arrived in Cambodia. Now tribes include approximately 150,000 people only. The Khmer Loeu have been loosely described as animists, but most indigenous ethnic groups have their own pantheon of local spirits. In general they see their world filled with various invisible spirits (often called yang), some benevolent, others malevolent. They associate spirits with rice, soil, water, fire, stones, paths, and so forth. Shamans, sorcerers or specialists in each village contact these spirits and prescribe ways to appease them.

In times of crisis or change, animal sacrifices may be made to placate the anger of the spirits. Illness is often believed to be caused by evil spirits or sorcerers. Some tribes have special medicine men or shamans who treat the sick. In addition to belief in spirits, villagers believe in taboos on many objects or practices. Among the Khmer Loeu, the Austronesian groups (Rhade and Jarai) have a well-developed hierarchy of spirits with a supreme ruler at its head.

== Judaism ==
There is a small Jewish community in Cambodia consisting of a little over 100 people. Since 2009, there has been a Chabad house in Phnom Penh.

== See also ==
- Freedom of religion in Cambodia
