= Kampong Trabaek District =

Kampong Trabaek ស្រុកកំពង់ត្របែក
- District (srok)
- Location in Cambodia
- Coordinates: 11°8′N 105°29′E
- Country: Cambodia
- Province: Prey Veng
- Communes: 13
- Villages: 122

Population (1998)
  - Total: 106,555
- Time zone: +7
- Geocode: 1403

Kampong Trabaek District (Khmer: ស្រុកកំពង់ត្របែក, pronounced [kɑmpoŋ trabaek]) is a district located in Prey Veng Province, in south eastern Cambodia. The district is bordered by Svay Rieng Province to the east, Vietnam to the south, Mesang District to the north and Prah Sdach District to the west.

== Communes ==
Kampong Trabek District is divided into 13 communes, organized into 122 villages. The communes are:

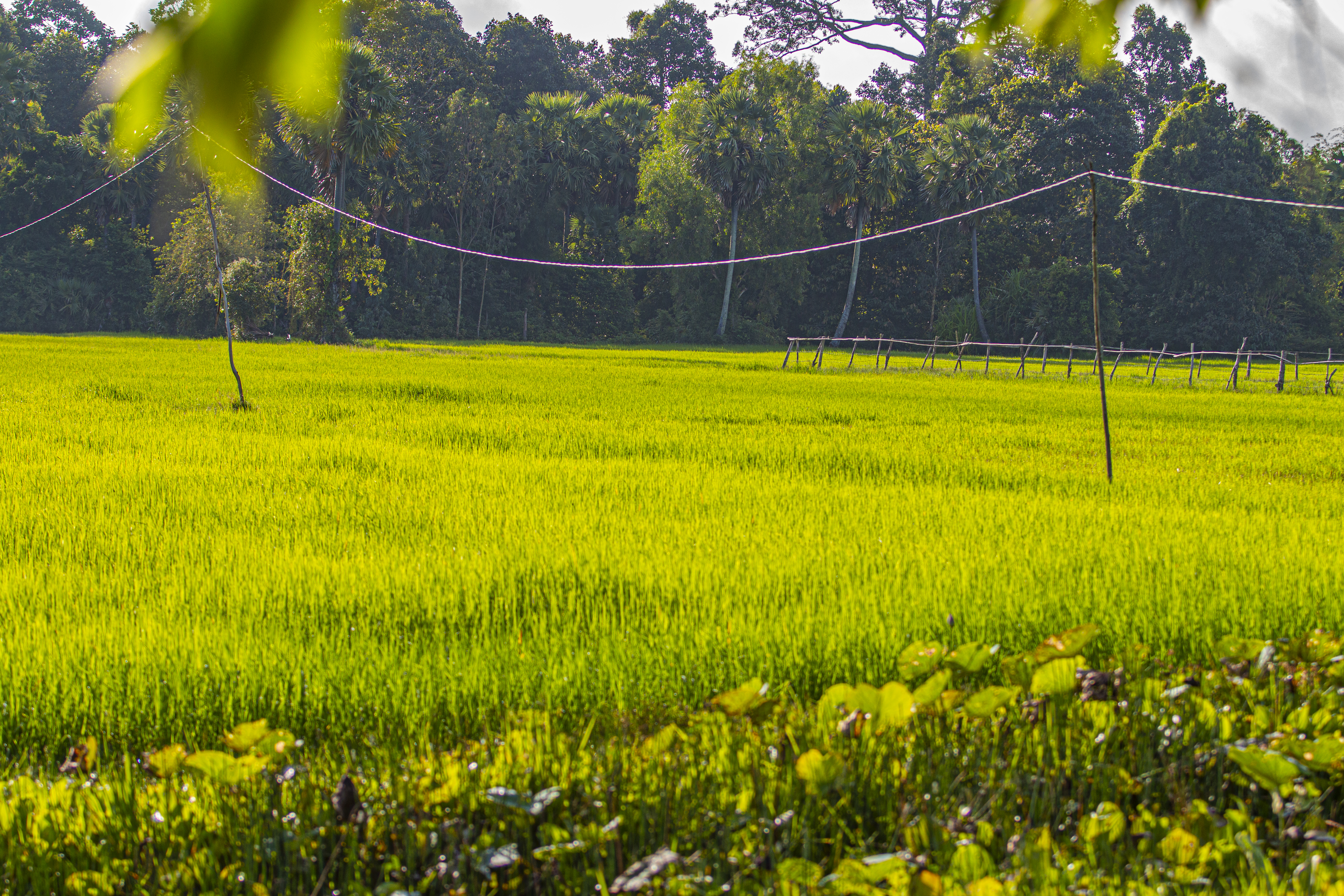
Green rice field in remote village in Kampong Trabaek District

- Ansaong (អន្សោង)
- Cham (ចាម)
- Cheang Dek (ជាងដែក)
- Chrey (ជ្រៃ)
- Kansaom Ak (កន្សោមអក)
- Kou Khchak (គួក ក្ចក)
- Kampong Trabaek (កំពង់ត្របែក)
- Peam Muntea (ពាមមន្ទារ)
- Prasat (ប្រាសាទ)
- Pratheat (ព្រះធាតុ)
- Prey Chhor (ព្រៃឈរ)
- Prey Pon sak ler (ព្រៃពោន)
- Thkov (ថ្កូវ)
