= Svay Antor district =

Svay Antor ស្រុកស្វាយអន្ទរ
- District (srok)
- Location in Cambodia
- Coordinates: 11.53837°N 105.43765°E
- Country: Cambodia
- Province: Prey Veng
- Communes: 11
- Villages: 138

Population (2008)
  - Total: 90,808
- Time zone: +7
- Geocode: 1413

Svay Antor (Khmer: ស្រុកស្វាយអន្ទរ), previously Prey Veng, is a district located in Prey Veng province. As of 2020, there are 11 communes (Khmer: Khum ឃុំ):

- Angkor Tret
- Chea Khlang
- Chrey
- Damrey Puon
- Mebon
- Pean Rong
- Po Puos
- Prey Khla
- Samrong
- Svay Antor
- Teuk Thla
