= Prey Veng Municipality =

Prey Veng ព្រៃវែង
- Municipality
- Prey Veng Municipality ក្រុងព្រៃវែង; Krong Prey Veng
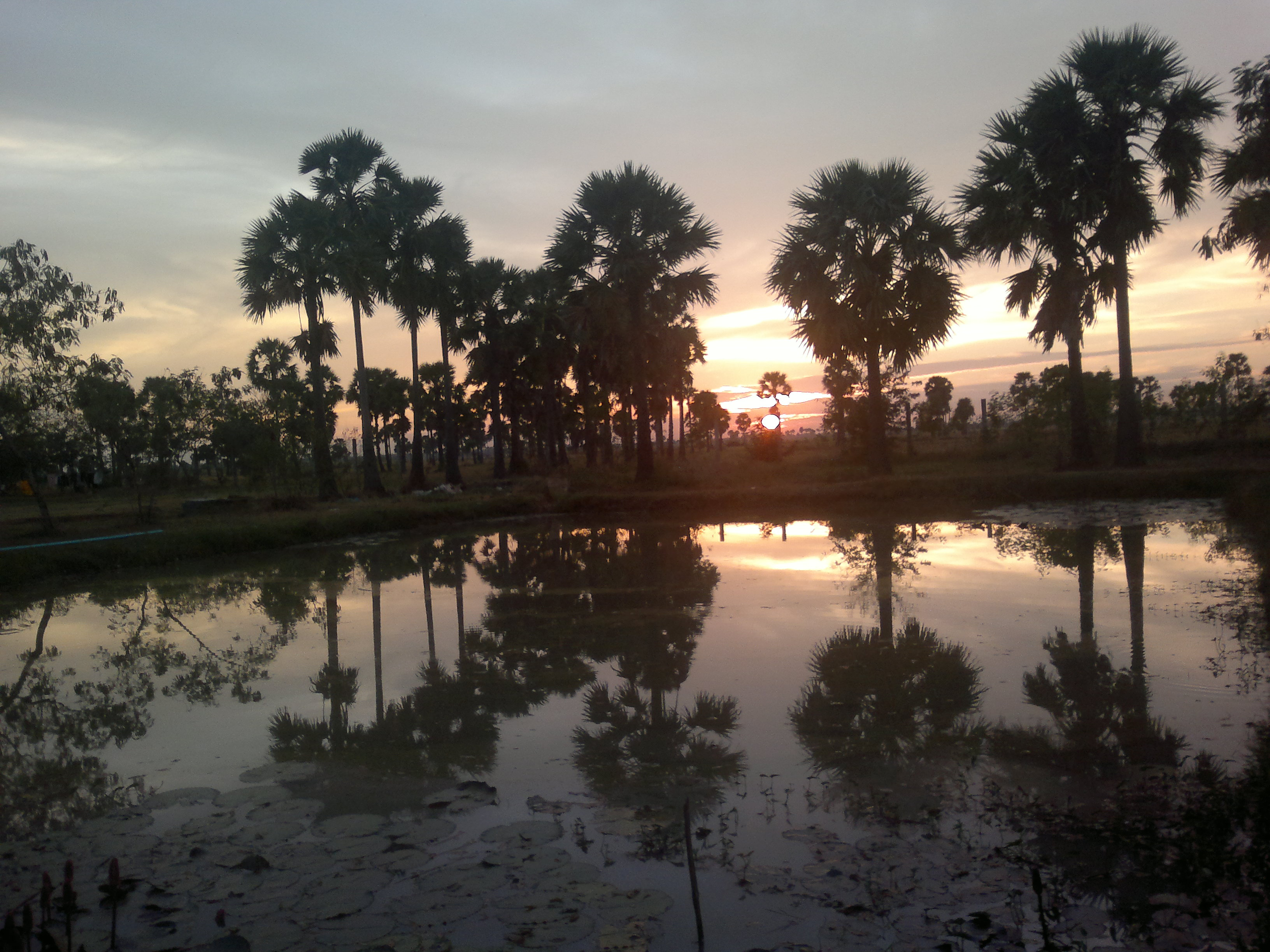

- Location in Cambodia
- Coordinates: 11°29′7″N 105°19′30″E
- Country: Cambodia
- Province: Prey Veng
- Capital: Prey Veng

Government
  - Type: City municipality
  - Mayor: Sin Sarak

Population (2008)
  - Total: 23,890
- Time zone: UTC+7 (ICT)
- Geocode: 1410

Prey Veng (Khmer: ព្រៃវែង, Prei Wêng; pronounced [prɨj.ʋɛːŋ]) is a municipality (krong) located in Prey Veng province, in south eastern Cambodia. The provincial capital Prey Veng town is located in the district.

== Administration ==
No.	District code	Sangkat (quarters)
1	1410-01	Baray សង្កាត់បារាយណ៍
2	1410-02	Cheung Teuk សង្កាត់ជើងទឹក
3	1410-03	Kampong Leav សង្កាត់កំពង់លាវ
4	1410-04	Ta Kao សង្កាត់តាកោ
