= Nur ul-Ihsan Mosque =

Former mosque in Phnom Penh, Cambodia

- ម៉ាស្ជិឌព្រែកប្រធាតុ
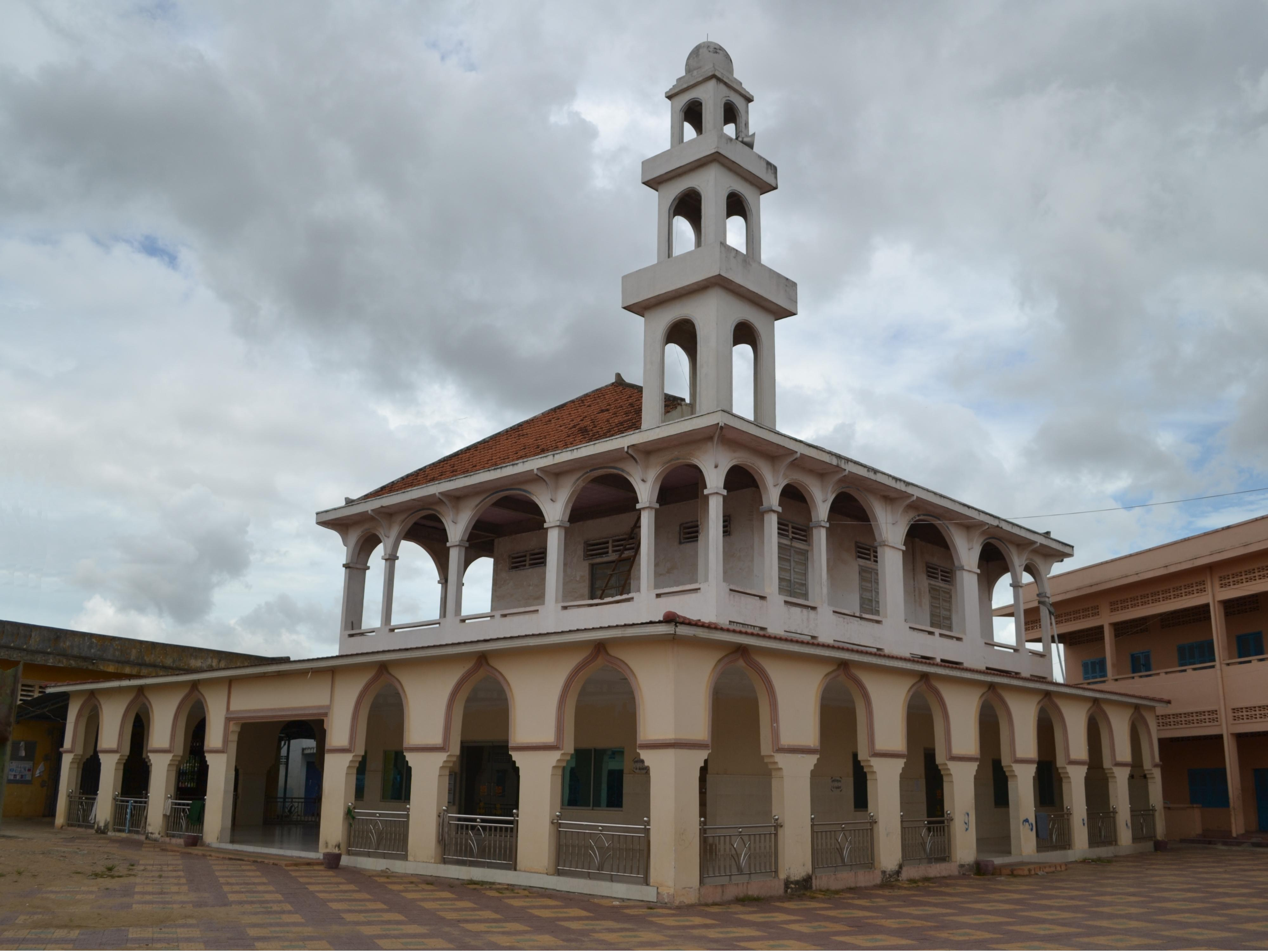
- The former mosque in 2013, prior to its destruction

- Location of the former mosque in Cambodia

Religion
- Affiliation: Sunni Islam (former)
- Ecclesiastical or organizational status: Mosque (1813–c. 1970s)
- Status: Destroyed

Location
- Location: Phnom Penh
- Country: Cambodia
- Interactive map of Nur ul-Ihsan Mosque
- Coordinates: 11°37′50″N 104°54′13″E

Architecture
- Type: Mosque
- Established: 1813
- Demolished: 2018
- Minaret: 1

The Nur ul-Ihsan Mosque (Khmer: ម៉ាស្ជិឌព្រែកប្រធាតុ) was, until 2018, the oldest mosque in Phnom Penh, the capital of Cambodia. It was situated 7 km north of the centre of the city.

It was built in 1813 by the Cham community. It survived the Khmer rouge regime which transformed it into a pigsty.

In 2018 it was destroyed and replaced by the KM7 Mosque, a Middle Eastern design financed by a donation from the Government of Kuwait.

== See also ==
- Islam in Cambodia
- List of mosques in Cambodia
