= List of mosques in Cambodia =

This is a list of mosques in Cambodia.

The construction of mosques in Cambodia itself has been documented since the time of the Islamic community Chams in Cambodia, until who escaped the ethnic cleansing by the Khmer Rouge. Because of that, they mostly hide along the Mekong River. Most of the mosques during the Khmer Rouge era were converted into pig pens, as a form of Islamophobia in Cambodia.

Name	Image	Location	Year (CE)	Remarks
Nur ul-Ihsan Mosque		Phnom Penh	1813	The oldest mosque in Cambodia; destroyed in 2018; and replaced by the KM7 Mosque.
Al-Serkal Mosque		Phnom Penh	1968	The original mosque was demolished in 2012 and a new building, a gift of the United Arab Emirates, was opened in 2014.
Darul Ta'Zim Mosque i		Kandal province		
An-Nur an-Na'im Mosque				
Dhiya-Ud-Din Mosque				
		Kandal province		
Syamsinah-Ar-Rahmah Mosque				
Prey-Pis Mosque				
Nurussalam Mosque				
Nemat Mosque				
Mahmood-Aini-mosque				
Khleang-Sbaik Mosque				
Attaowa Mosque				
Al-Muttaqin Mosque				
Al-Makmur-Chrak-Romeat-Mosque				
Arrahman Mosque				
Deroesalam Mosque				
Duong-village-mosque		Duong village		
KM 7 Mosque		Phnom Penh	2018	Replaced the former Nur ul-Ihsan Mosque
KM 9 Mosque				
Muk-Dak-Mosque				

== See also ==
- Islam in Cambodia
- Lists of mosques
