= Kanhchriech District =

Kanhchriech កញ្ច្រៀច
- District
- Kanhchriech District ស្រុកកញ្ច្រៀច
- Location in Cambodia
- Coordinates: 11°42′N 105°32′E
- Country: Cambodia
- Province: Prey Veng

Population (1998)
  - Total: 56,026
- Time zone: UTC+7 (ICT)
- Geocode: 1404

Kanhchriech (Khmer: កញ្ច្រៀច, pronounced [kaɲ.criəc]) is a district (Srok) located in Prey Veng Province in southeastern Cambodia.
