= Me Sang District =

Me Sang មេសាង
- District
- Me Sang District ស្រុកមេសាង
- Location in Cambodia
- Coordinates: 11°18′N 105°33′E
- Country: Cambodia
- Province: Prey Veng

Population (1998)
  - Total: 92,359
- Time zone: UTC+7 (ICT)
- Geocode: 1405

Me Sang (Khmer: មេសាង, pronounced [meː.saːŋ]) is a district (srok) located in Prey Veng Province, in south eastern Cambodia.
