= Prey Veng (city) =

Prey Veng ព្រៃវែង
- City
- Prey Veng City ក្រុងព្រៃវែង
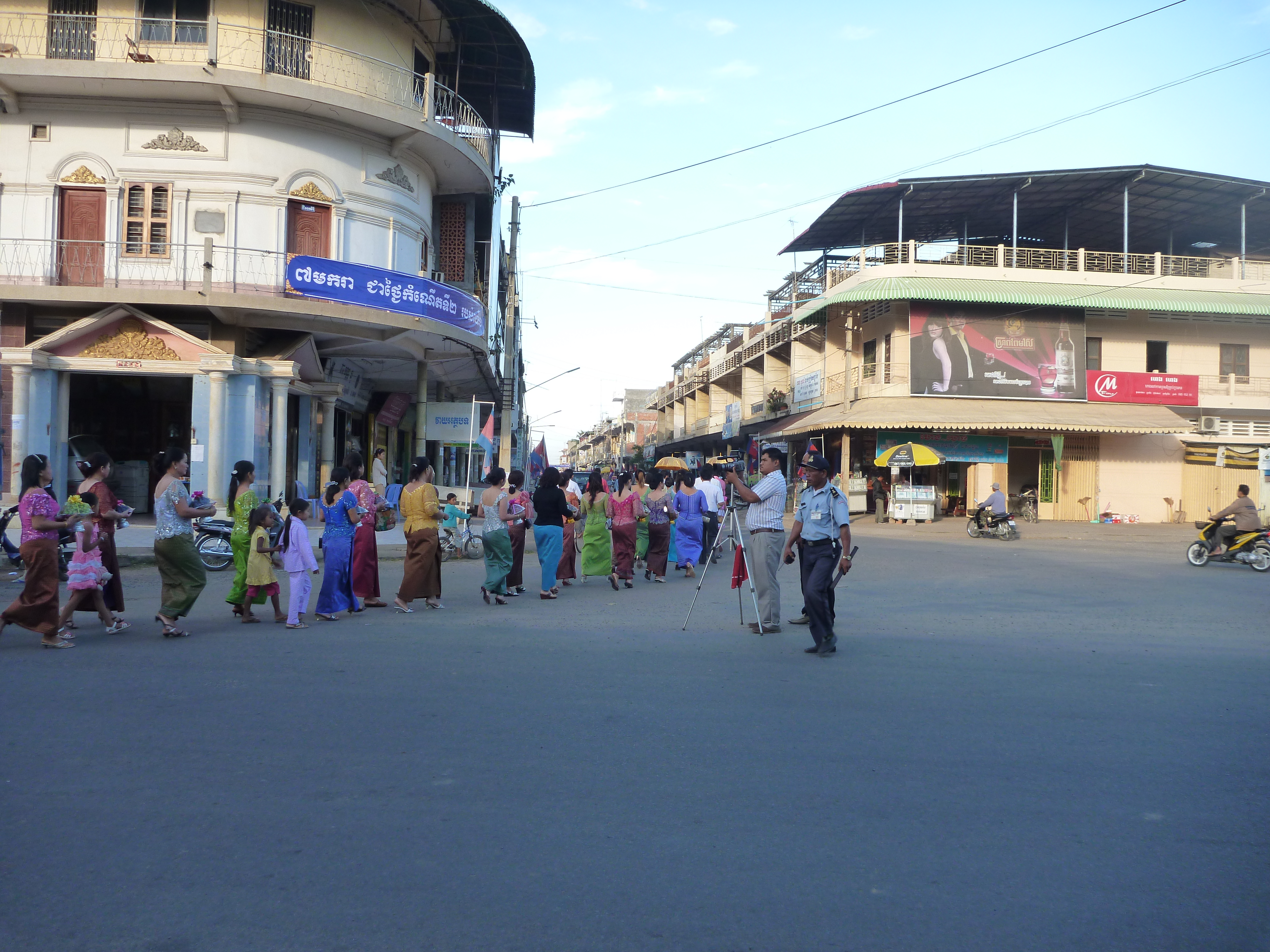

- Location within Cambodia
- Coordinates: 11°29′N 105°19′E
- Country: Cambodia
- Province: Prey Veng
- Municipality: Prey Veng

Government
  - Type: City
- Elevation: 7 m (23 ft)

Population (2019)
  - Total: 36,254
- Time zone: UTC+7 (ICT)

Prey Veng (Khmer: ព្រៃវែង [prɨj.ʋɛːŋ]) is the capital of Prey Veng Province, located in southeastern Cambodia.

== Geography ==
The town is located on National Road 11 between Nak Loeung and Kampong Cham. It is located about 2½ hours by road from Phnom Penh.

This quaint town is off the usual tourist trail and is uncrowded. It houses several old dilapidated colonial French Indochina era homes.

There is a large seasonal lake west of the city, which is usually dry from March to August.

=== Climate ===
Climate data for Prey Veng (1982–2024)
Month	Jan	Feb	Mar	Apr	May	Jun	Jul	Aug	Sep	Oct	Nov	Dec	Year
Mean daily maximum °C (°F)	32.0 (89.6)	32.9 (91.2)	34.0 (93.2)	34.7 (94.5)	34.2 (93.6)	33.8 (92.8)	33.2 (91.8)	32.7 (90.9)	32.4 (90.3)	32.0 (89.6)	31.4 (88.5)	32.2 (90.0)	33.0 (91.3)
Mean daily minimum °C (°F)	21.9 (71.4)	22.0 (71.6)	23.0 (73.4)	24.6 (76.3)	24.7 (76.5)	24.9 (76.8)	24.5 (76.1)	25.0 (77.0)	24.8 (76.6)	24.4 (75.9)	24.0 (75.2)	22.6 (72.7)	23.9 (75.0)
Average precipitation mm (inches)	26.8 (1.06)	8.5 (0.33)	59.3 (2.33)	73.4 (2.89)	117.3 (4.62)	164.8 (6.49)	153.6 (6.05)	149.1 (5.87)	208.2 (8.20)	272.5 (10.73)	126.3 (4.97)	38.9 (1.53)	1,398.7 (55.07)
Source: World Meteorological Organization
