= Prey Veng province =

Province of Cambodia

Prey Veng Province ខេត្តព្រៃវែង
- Province

Khmer transcription(s)
  - Khmer: ខេត្តព្រៃវែង
  - UNGEGN: Khaet Prei Vêng
  - ALA-LC: Khett Prai Vaeng
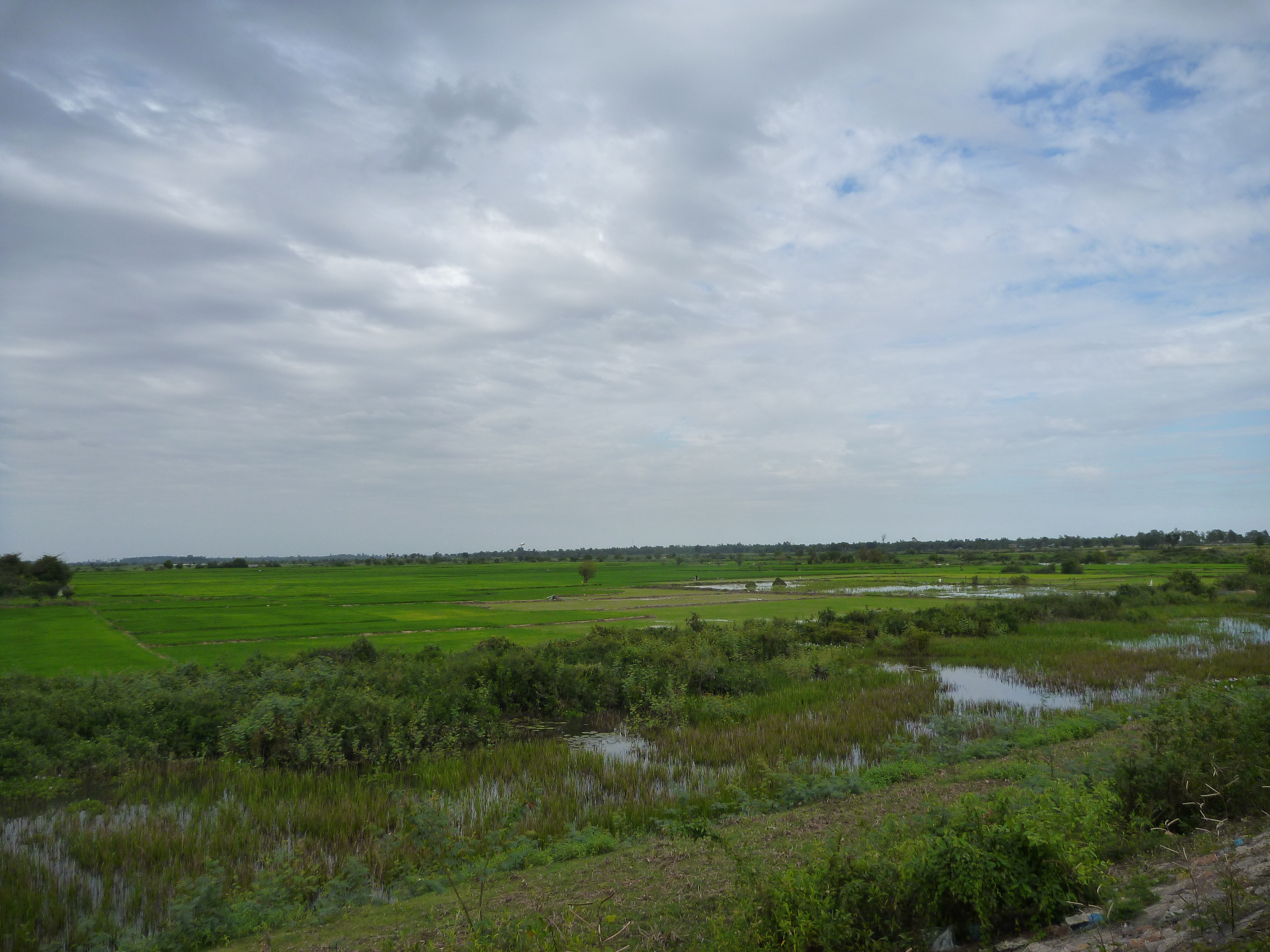
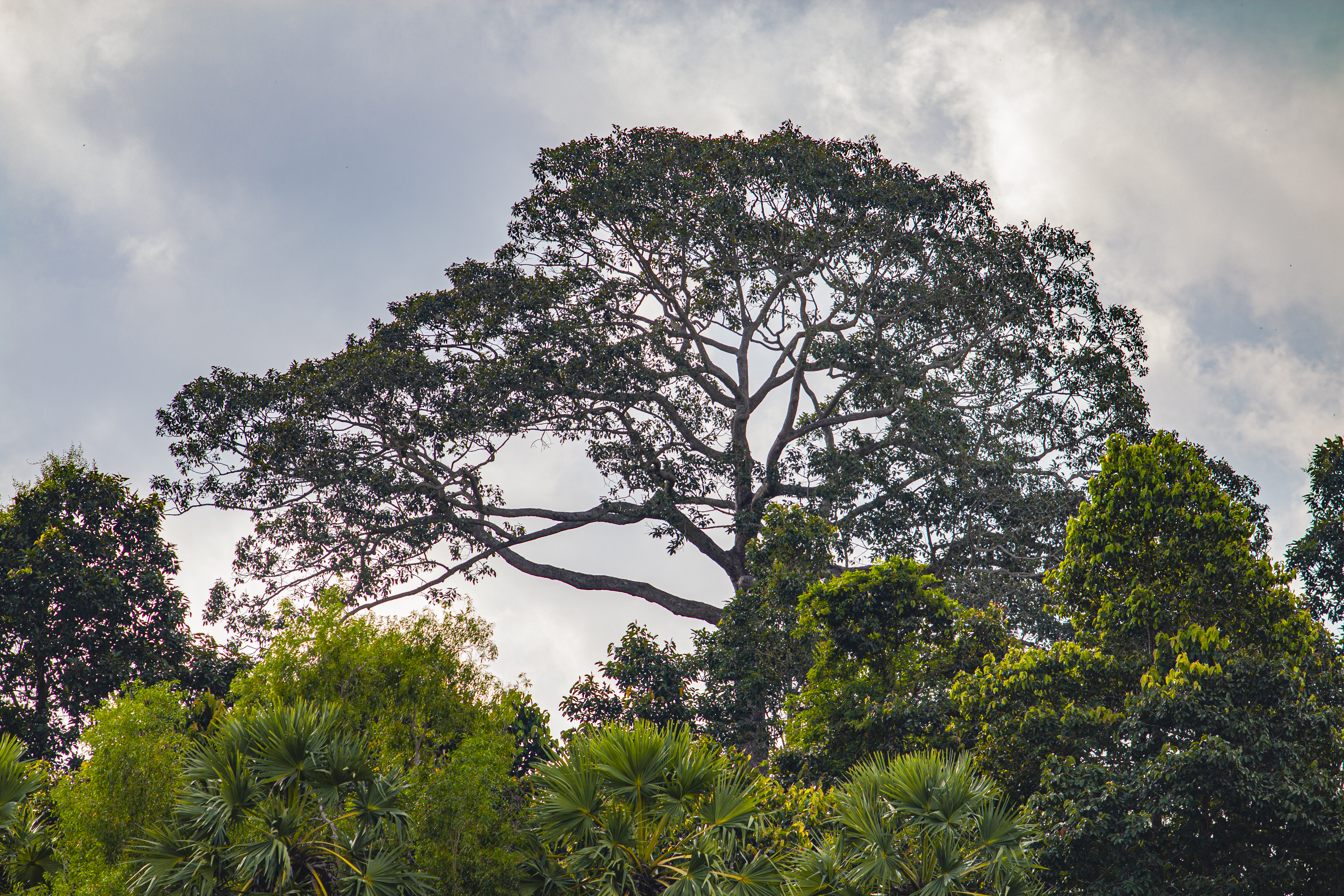
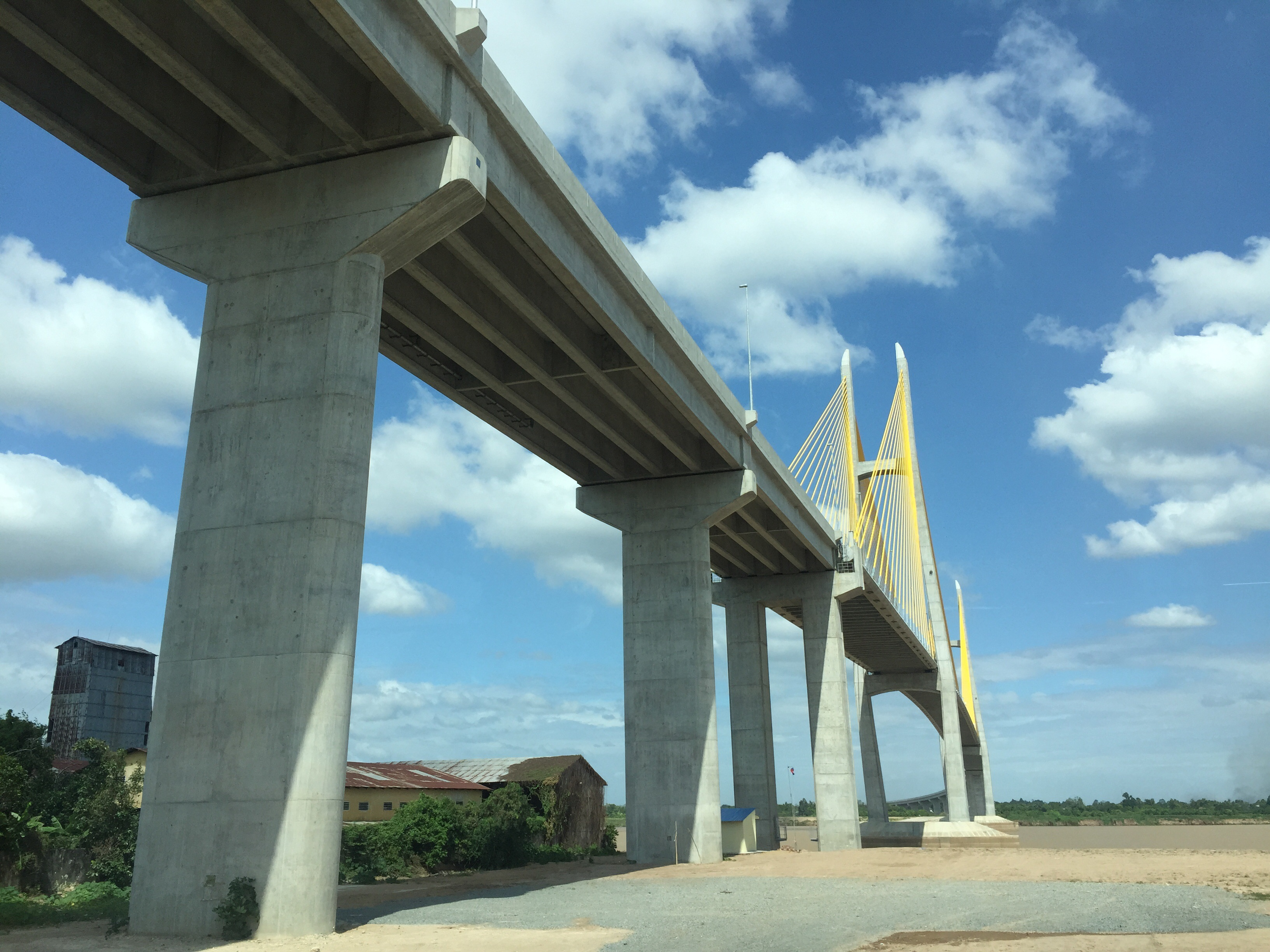

- Seal

- Map of Cambodia highlighting Prey Veng
- Coordinates: 11°29′N 105°20′E
- Country: Cambodia
- Provincial status: 1907
- Capital: Prey Veng

Government
  - Governor: Suon Somalin (CPP)
  - National Assembly: 11 / 125

Area
  - Total: 4,883 km^{2} (1,885 sq mi)
  - Rank: 16th

Population (2024)
  - Total: ▲1,331,111
  - Rank: 3rd
  - Density: 217/km^{2} (560/sq mi)
  - Rank: 4th
- Time zone: UTC+07:00 (ICT)
- Dialing code: +855
- ISO 3166 code: KH-14
- HDI (2017): 0.555 medium

Prey Veng Province (Khmer: ខេត្តព្រៃវែង, Khaet Prei Vêng, [prɨj. ʋɛːŋ]; lit. 'tall forest') is a province of Cambodia. The capital is Prey Veng. The province is bordered by those of Kampong Cham to the northwest, Tbong Khmum to the northeast, Kandal to the west, and Svay Rieng to the east and by Vietnam (Đồng Tháp and Tây Ninh) or Kampuchea Krom (Phsar Dek, Kampong Kho and Rong Domrey) to the south. It is crossed by two major rivers of the country, namely the Mekong and Tonle Bassac.

== Population ==
The total population is 947,357 persons or 7.07% of the total population of 13,388,910 persons in Cambodia.

== Districts ==
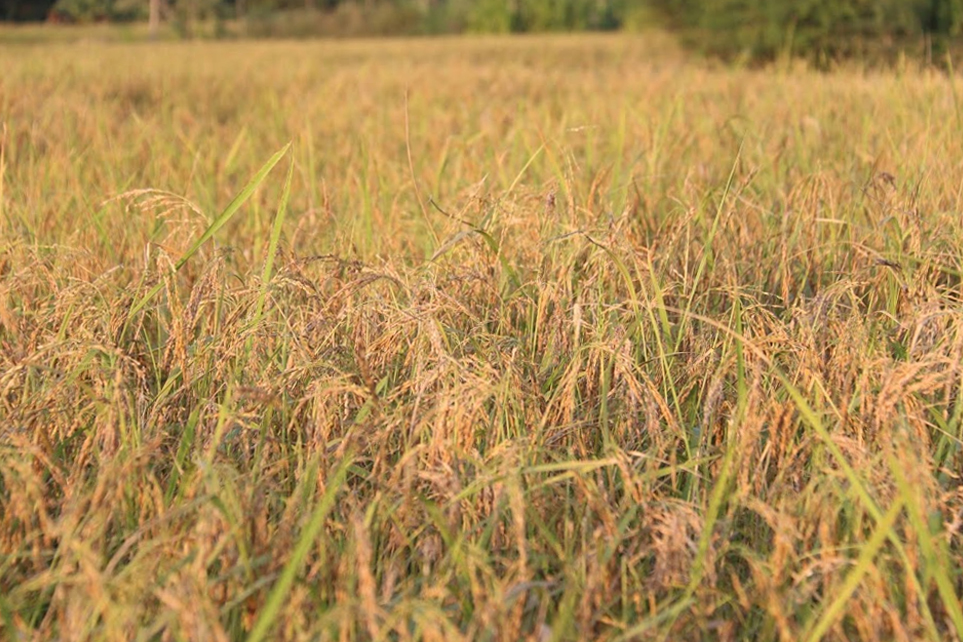
Golden rice field in Prey Veng province

The province contains 1139 villages organized by 116 communes and 12 districts and 1 municipality. The districts are:

| ISO code | District | Khmer |
|---|---|---|
| 14–01 | Ba Phnum | ស្រុកបាភ្នំ |
| 14–02 | Kamchay Mear | ស្រុកកំចាយមារ |
| 14–03 | Kampong Trabaek | ស្រុកកំពង់ត្របែក |
| 14–04 | Kanhchriech | ស្រុកកញ្ជ្រៀច |
| 14–05 | Me Sang | ស្រុកមេសាង |
| 14–06 | Peam Chor | ស្រុកពាមជរ |
| 14–07 | Peam Ro | ស្រុកពាមរក៍ |
| 14–08 | Pea Reang | ស្រុកពារាំង |
| 14–09 | Preah Sdach | ស្រុកព្រះស្ដេច |
| 14–10 | Prey Veng Municipality | ក្រុងព្រៃវែង |
| 14–11 | Pur Rieng | ស្រុកពោធិ៍រៀង |
| 14–12 | Sithor Kandal | ស្រុកស៊ីធរកណ្ដាល |
| 14–13 | Svay Antor | ស្រុកស្វាយអន្ទរ |

== Religion ==
Religion in Prey Veng (2019 census)
1. Buddhism (99.5%)
2. Islam (0.20%)
3. Christianity (0.30%)
4. Animism and Other religions (0.00%)

== Sources ==
Cambodian Ministry of Agriculture, Forestry and Fisheries
