= Islam in Cambodia =

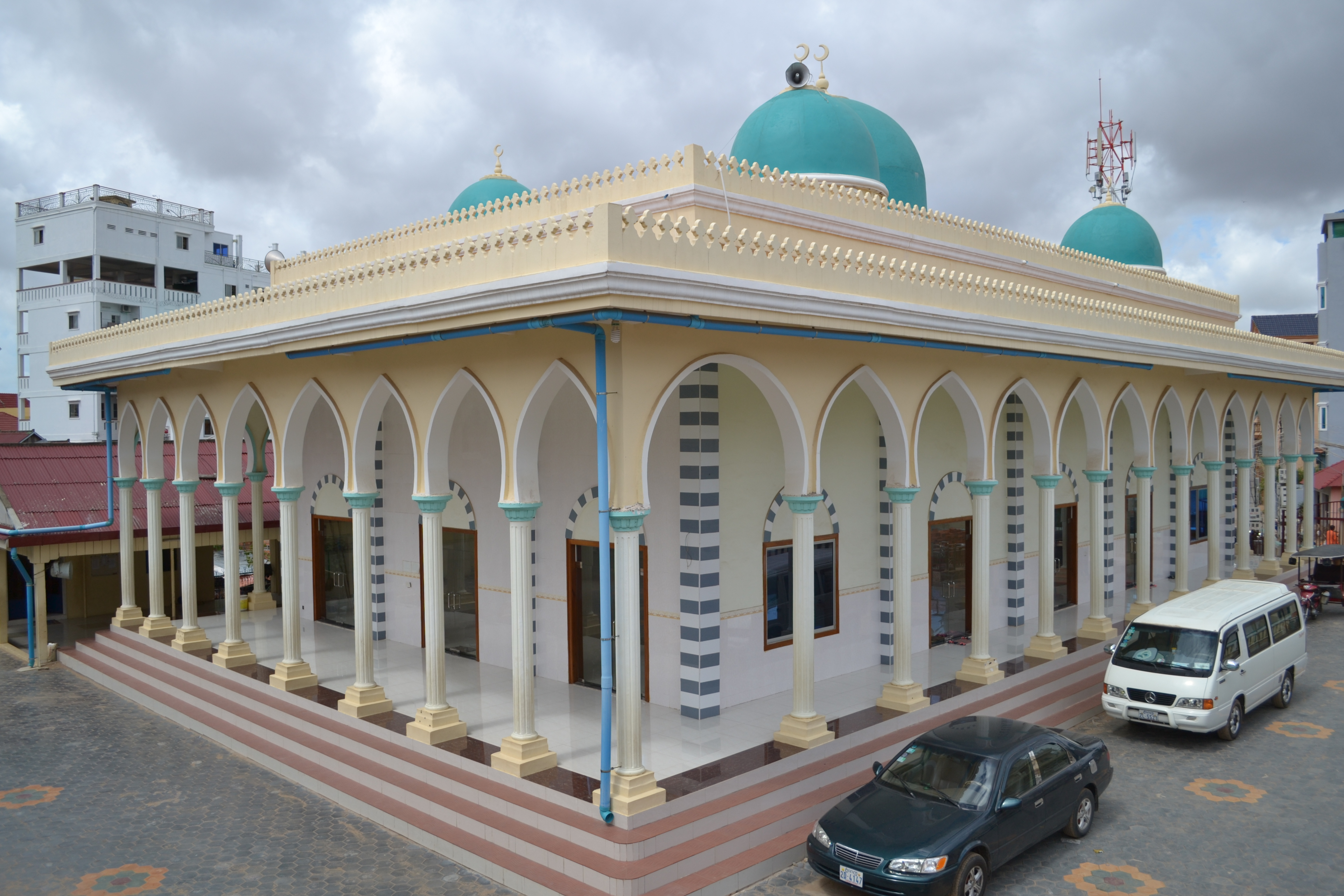
Nur ul-Ihsan Mosque

Islam is the religion of a majority of the Cham and Malay minorities in Cambodia. According to activist Po Dharma, there were 150,000 to 200,000 Muslims in Cambodia as late as 1975, although this may have been an exaggeration. Persecution under the Khmer Rouge eroded their numbers, however, and by the late 1980s they probably had not regained their former strength. In 2009, the Pew Research Center estimated that 1.6% of the population, or 236,000 people were Muslims. Ten years later, according to the 2019 Cambodian census, the Muslim population had rose to 2% of the country's population.

== Demography ==
In 2009, the Pew Research Center estimated that 1.6% of the population, or 236,000 people were Muslims. According to from general Population census results of the Kingdom of Cambodia 2019, there are around 311,045 Muslims in the country as of 2019. As of 2016, data from the Ministry also recorded 884 mosques scattered all throughout Cambodia. Tboung Khmum is a province where the percentage of Muslims is the largest among other provinces, namely 11.8%.

== Historical background ==
The Chams originated from the Kingdom of Champa. After Vietnam invaded and conquered Champa, Cambodia granted refuge to Cham Muslims escaping from Vietnamese conquest. According to some accounts, the Chams first contacted Islam in one of the fathers-in-law of Prophet Muhammad. He is Jahsh, the father of Zaynab bint Jahsh. It was in the wake of many Sahabas who arrived in Indo-China in 617-18 from Abyssinia by sea route. In 1642, King Ramathipadi I ascended the throne of Cambodia and converted to Islam, becoming the only Muslim ruler of Cambodia. After the massacre of Dutch VOC representatives and the expulsion of the VOC from Cambodia, popular discontentment from the majority Buddhist populace deposed him with the aid of the Nguyen lords in 1658, causing much instability in Cambodia in the years following his reign.

== Cham Muslims ==
The Cham have their own mosques. In 1962, there were about 100 mosques in the country. At the end of the nineteenth century, the Muslims in Cambodia formed a unified community under the authority of four religious dignitaries — mupti (mufti), tuk kalih, raja kalik, and tvan pake. A council of notables in Cham villages consisted of one hakem (judge) and several katip (preacher), bilal (rinse), and labi. The four high dignitaries and the hakem were exempt from personal taxes, and they were invited to take part in major national ceremonies at the royal court. When Cambodia became independent, the Islamic community was placed under the control of a five-member council that represented the community in official functions and in contacts with other Islamic communities. Each Muslim community has a hakem who leads the community and the mosque, an imam who leads the prayers, and a bilal who calls the faithful to the daily prayers. The peninsula of Chrouy Changvar near Phnom Penh is considered the spiritual center of the Cham, and several high Muslim officials reside there. Each year some of the Cham go to study the Qur'an at Kelantan in Malaysia, and some go on to study in, or make a pilgrimage to, Mecca. According to figures from the late 1950s, about 7 percent of the Cham had completed the pilgrimage and could wear the fez or turban as a sign of their accomplishment.

The traditional Cham retain many ancient Muslim or pre-Muslim traditions and rites. They consider Allah as the all-powerful God, but they also recognize other non-Islamic practices. They are closer, in many respects, to the Cham of coastal Vietnam than they are to other Muslims. The religious dignitaries of the traditional Cham (and of the Cham in Vietnam) dress completely in white, and they shave their heads and faces. These Cham believe in the power of magic and sorcery, and they attach great importance to magical practices in order to avoid sickness or slow or violent death. They believe in many supernatural powers. Although they show little interest in the pilgrimage to Mecca and in the five daily prayers, the traditional Cham do celebrate many Muslim festivals and rituals.

The orthodox Cham have adopted a more conformist religion largely because of their close contacts with, and intermarriages with, the Malay community. In fact, the orthodox Cham have adopted Malay customs and family organization, and many speak the Malay language. They send pilgrims to Mecca, and they attend international Islamic conferences. Conflicts between the traditional and the orthodox Cham increased between 1954 and 1975. For example, the two groups polarized the population of one village, and each group eventually had its own mosque and separate religious organization.

== Chvea Muslims ==
The Chvea (literally "Java") arrived in Cambodia in the 14th century from the Malay Peninsula and Indonesian Archipelago, and traditionally occupied the coastal part of the country. Some scholars argue that intermarriage between these groups has served to form a separate Muslim community, while other scholars identify them as the Cham people. Unlike the Cham, the Chvea do not speak the Cham language; they speak exclusively Khmer as their mother tongue and have been fully integrated into the Khmer linguistic landscape for centuries.

== Khmer Muslims ==
Khmer is the largest ethnicity in Cambodia which the majority follows to Theravada Buddhism. There are also Khmer Muslim converts from Buddhism and these can be found in Kwan village, Kampong Speu. Where Islam was spread by Abdul Amit a Cham farmer to the villagers of Kwan.

Khmer Muslims refer to individuals from the majority Khmer ethnic group who practice Islam and speak the Khmer language as their primary or native tongue. Unlike the Cham minority who retain their own Austronesian language and distinct historical identity, ethnic Khmer Muslims are deeply rooted in mainstream Khmer cultural traditions, differing primarily only in their religious faith.

The most prominent historical instance of an ethnic Khmer converting to Islam occurred in 1642, when King Ramathipadi I (also known as Ponhea Chan or Sultan Ibrahim) embraced Islam. Upon his conversion, he adopted Islamic dress, took a Muslim wife, and encouraged members of the royal court and the wider Khmer administration to accept the faith. Although his reign ended in 1658 and the state reverted to Buddhism, this era marked the earliest structured integration of Islamic practice directly within the ethnic Khmer population.

In the 21st century, a growing number of indigenous Buddhist Khmers have voluntarily converted to Islam, driven by intermarriage, increased exposure to global Islamic networks, and localized humanitarian programs sponsored by international Muslim organizations. These modern converts remain culturally and linguistically Khmer, utilizing Khmer-language translations of the Quran and Islamic literature for worship.

== Persecution ==
Persecution of the Cham in Cambodia took place mainly during the Khmer Rouge regime from 1975 to 1979. The Khmer Rouge gained had control over the Democratic Kampuchea (DK) after defeating the Khmer Republic forces in 1975. Under its leader Pol Pot, the Khmer Rouge – formally known as the Communist Party of Kampuchea (CPK) – set to redefine the policies of the Democratic Kampuchea through its agrarian and inward-looking economic-political outlook. This resulted in the massive relocation of the masses from urban areas to the countryside where they were forced to work in the fields every day with little food and rest. On top of that, the Khmer Rouge regime began to systematically dismantle the socioeconomic structures of the people and screen them based on their political, religious, and ethnic backgrounds in order to maintain socio-political order based on Pol Pot’s communist ideals. Buddhism, which was then the dominant faith group in Cambodian society, was repressed; the monks were made to be defrocked and sent to work in the fields. Scholars and historians have differed in the definite number of victims, but have estimated that nearly one-third of the Cambodian population than were estimated to have been killed by the regime or died out of starvation and disease - bringing the total number to be between the ranges of 1.05 million to 2.2 million lives. The Cham were also not spared from persecution, torture, and death under the hands of the regime.

David Chandler opined that, although ethnic minorities fell victim to the Khmer Rouge regime, they were not targeted specifically because of their ethnic backgrounds, but rather because they were mostly enemies of the revolution (Kiernan, 2002:252; see also the footnote on Chandler’s The Tragedy of Cambodian History, pp. 4, 263–65, 285). Furthermore, Chandler also rejects the use of the terms “chauvinism” and “genocide” just to avoid drawing possible parallels to Hitler. This indicates that Chandler does not believe in the argument of charging the Khmer Rouge regime with the crime of genocide. Similarly, Michael Vickery holds a similar position to Chandler’s, and refuses to acknowledge the atrocities of the Khmer Rouge regime as genocide; Vickery regarded the Khmer Rouge a “chauvinist” regime, due to its anti-Vietnam and anti-religion policies (Kiernan, 2002:252; see Vickery’s Cambodia 1975-1982, pp. 181–82, 255, 258, 264–65). Stephen Heder also conceded that the Khmer Rouge were not guilty of genocide, stating that the atrocities of the regime were not motivated by race (Kiernan, 2002:252; see Heder’s From Pol Pot to Pen Sovan to the Villages, p. 1).

Ben Kiernan makes the argument that it was indeed genocide and disagrees with the three scholars, by bringing forth examples from the history of the Cham people in Cambodia, as did an international tribunal finding Nuon Chea and Khieu Samphan guilty 92 and 87 counts of said crime respectively According to Ben Kiernan, the racialization of the Cham during the colonial and post-colonial eras could be the main reason behind the Khmer Rouge's hatred of the Cham people. Misinformation and racial stereotypes were used to disconnect the Cham from their ancestral homelands, including the Cham extinction theory that was proposed by colonial scholars, according to that theory, the "real" Cham were extinct. Kiernan writes: "In the twentieth century, Chams have suffered from two myths: the glory of their "empire" has been exaggerated, and so has their present plight. A romanticized view of Cham doom helped deprive them of rights in 1975–79. They were called "Malays" by the French, and after Cambodia's independence, received a new, equally inaccurate label: "Islamic Khmers." Again their ethnic origin was denied, in the perverse sense, Chams became victims of History." Scholars also compare the denial of the Khmer Rouge's racist motivation for its genocide against the Cham to the denial of the Holocaust, both forms of genocide denial are analogous narrational canards that seek to use victims' religions to justify the actions of genocide perpetrators but they ignore wider race and ethnic hatreds and discriminatory backgrounds

== Today ==
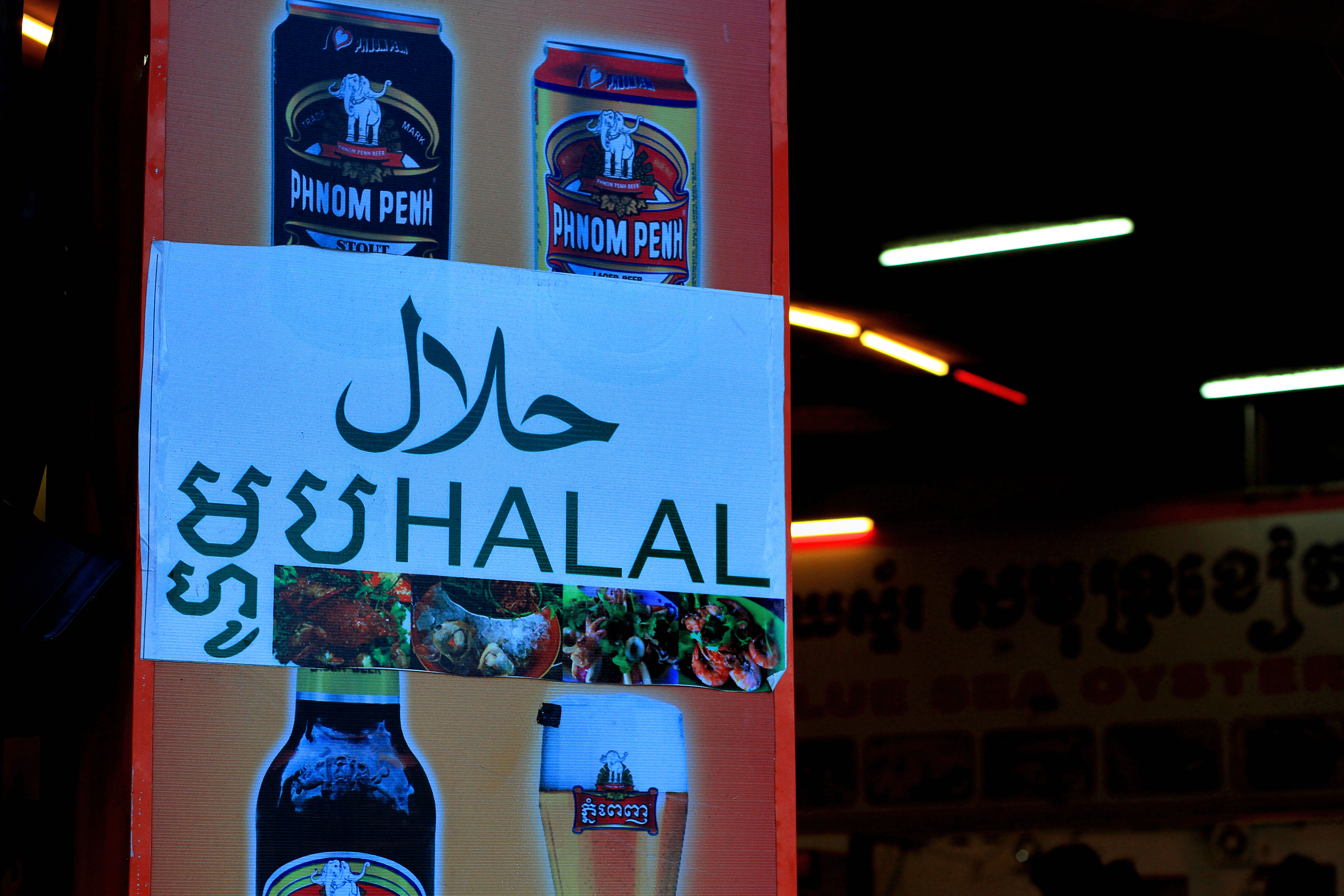
Halal food sign in Phnom Penh

Islam is an officially recognised religion in the country, and Muslims practice their religion normally and out in the open. The term Khmer Muslims as a whole is considered discrimination against minorities, especially the Cham. This commenced in the People's Republic of Kampuchea era, where religions were restored and allowed to be practiced again. The Chams also enjoy democratic rights like all Khmer citizens, with the right to vote and be elected as politicians. The government also sponsors annual iftar gatherings during the holy Islamic month of Ramadan. In 2018, the leader of the Organisation of Islamic Cooperation (OIC) called Cambodia a "beacon for Muslim coexistence".

In 2016, amateur football club was founded by the Cambodian Youth Muslim Alliance, namely CMYA FC, which is to accommodate Muslim youth, especially in the field of sports.

== Notable Muslims ==
- Ramathipadi I, King of Cambodia
- Amath Yashya, Cambodian politician
- Yeu Muslim, Cambodian footballer
- Sareth Krya, Cambodian footballer
- Sos Suhana, Cambodian footballer
- Les Kosem, Cambodian military officer

== See also ==
- Religion in Cambodia
- Kan Imam San
- Cham people
- Islam in Vietnam
- Utsuls
- Mosques in Cambodia
- Kampong Cham Province
