= Trapeang Phong =

Temple in Cambodia

Prasat Trapeang Phong
- ប្រាសាទត្រពាំងផុង
- Location in Cambodia

Religion
- Affiliation: Hinduism
- District: Prasat Bakong
- Province: Siem Reap
- Deity: Harihara

Location
- Location: Kok Srok village, Roluos commune, Prasat Bakong District, Siem Reap Province
- Country: Cambodia
- Interactive map of Prasat Trapeang Phong
- Coordinates: 13°18′33″N 103°58′05″E

Architecture
- Style: Early Angkorian
- Creator: Jayavarman III
- Completed: mid-9th century CE

Specifications
- Length: 7 m (23 ft)
- Width: 7 m (23 ft)
- Height (max): 16 m
- Materials: Brick, sandstone, laterite

The Trapeang Phong temple (Khmer: ប្រាសាទត្រពាំងផុង) is an early Hindu temple that was built by King Jayavarman III in the middle of the 9th century. The temple, is made of a singular brick, is 7x7 meters in size and 16 meters in height.

In 2024, Cambodia’s APSARA National Authority archelogists have started to restore parts of the temple that has been damaged under the impacts of weather conditions. The Trapeang Phong temple is among the historic temples located within Angkor Archaeological Park, which was designated as a UNESCO World Heritage Site in 1992.

== Location ==
The Trapeang Phong temple is located in the Siem Reap province of northwestern Cambodia, within the Angkor Archaeological Park. Administratively, it lies in the Prasat Bakong District, specifically in the Roluos Commune, near a village called Kok Srok. This places the temple in the area of the ancient city Hariharalaya, which was the first capital of Angkor in the 9th century. It is 200 miles (320 km) northwest of Phom Penh, Cambodia’s capital.

=== Physical surroundings ===
The Trapeang Phong temple stands on a low natural mound amid wetlands south of Roluos. Situated in a zone that is regularly flooded by the fluctuations of the Tonlé Sap lake, the temple’s site is rarely visited, it is only accessible by a track or by boat, as the track is often submerged during the rainy season. In fact, in wet season, the temple’s mound which becomes and island, is only accessible by boat. In the dry season, the waters recede, revealing two man made ponds.

Two rectangular reservoirs are associated with the Trapeang Phong temple, the name trapeang itself means “reservoir,”. One lies immediately to the east of the temple mound, measuring roughly 270 m by 75 m, oriented east–west. Another, larger reservoir is located to the north of the site. These reservoirs are thought to have been prototypes for the later Angkorian hydraulic systems.

== Site ==
Like most other Angkorian temples, the Trapeang Phong temple is oriented towards the east. With its doorway on the eastern side, there are false doors on the other three sides. Originally, the temple was not an isolated brick tower but part of a broader temple compound. It is noted that the site featured five towers, a library building.

Today, however, only the main central sanctuary tower remains standing, and the temple's entrance porch and sandstone doorframe on the east are partly broken but still display intricately carved lintels and colonnettes. The false doors on the north, west, and south sides are made of sandstone and are in relatively good condition. Notably, the brick walls of the shrine bear some of Angkor's oldest apsara carvings, executed in stucco over brick.

== History ==
Believed to have been the center of Hariharalaya, the first capital of the Khmer Empire under Jayavarman II in the Angkor region before the end of the 9th century, the temple occupies a significant place in early Khmer history. The temple served a Hindu sectarian function, likely dedicated to Harihara, Harihara being a syncretic form combining Shiva and Vishnu. In fact, the Trapeang Phong temple may have given its name to the city Hariharalaya, the word Alaya (Sanskrit: आलय) meaning temple or sanctuary.

== Restoration ==
The temple of Trapeang Phong was first cleared in 1936 by an archaeological mission directed by Philippe Stern and Jacques Lagisquet. Excavations revealed that the well-preserved central brick tower was in fact part of a larger architectural complex composed of several sanctuaries and platforms. Phillipe Stern dated the core tower to the mid-9th century, while assigning the smaller towers to the late-8th-century early Angkorian style.

In modern times, more systematic conservation efforts have been undertaken by the Franco-Khmer Archaeological Mission on the Territorial Planning of Angkor (Mafkata), established in 1999 with the support of the French Ministry of Foreign Affairs and in collaboration with APSARA.Two major excavation campaigns were conducted in 2004 and 2005, during which 21 archaeological trenches were opened. These investigations demonstrated that the large reservoirs and platforms shaping the current topography were late Angkorian constructions. They also confirmed the importance of the site for understanding the beginnings of Angkorian urbanism, while rejecting earlier hypotheses that identified the Trapeang Phong temple as the center of the first capital.
