= Angkor Thom district =

Angkor Thom ស្រុកអង្គរធំ
- District (srok)
- District location in Siem Reap province
- Coordinates: 13°26′N 103°51′E
- Country: Cambodia
- Province: Siem Reap

Area
  - Total: 307.5 km^{2} (118.7 sq mi)

Population (2019)
  - Total: 29,154
- Time zone: +7
- Geocode: 1702

Angkor Thom (Khmer: ស្រុកអង្គរធំ) is a district in Siem Reap Province, Cambodia. It covers an area of approximately 307.5 km^{2} (118.7 sq mi) and had a population of 29,154 in 2019. It is subdivided into four communes and 25 villages.

== Geography ==
Angkor Thum is one of the districts (srok) of Siem Reap province, Cambodia. It covered a total area of approximately 307.5 km^{2} (118.7 sq mi), and is one of the smallest districts in Siem Reap Province by land area. In 2009, 181.43 km^{2} (70.05 sq mi) of the land area was occupied by forests, 53.84 km^{2} (20.79 sq mi) was classified as cultivable land, and 38.53 km^{2} (14.88 sq mi) as built up land. It is bordered by Banteay Srei and Angkor Chum Districts, and connected to Varin District by contiguous forests.

== Administration ==
The district is headed by a district governor. Angkor Thum District is subdivided into four communes (khum) – Chob Ta Trav, Leang Dai, Peak Snaeng, and Svay Chek. The district administration office is located approximately 15 km (9.3 mi) from the commune office of Chob Ta Trav, 0.1 km (0.062 mi) from Leang Dai, 7 km (4.3 mi) from Peak Snaeng, and 6 km (3.7 mi) from Svay Chek. The communes are administered by commune councils headed by commune chiefs, elected directly for five-year terms. The four communes are further subdivided into 25 villages (phum). Chob Ta Trav consists of five villages, Leang Dai has eight, Peak Snaeng and Svay Chek have six each.

== Demographics ==
According to the 1998 census, Angkor Thom District had a population of 17,750, including 8,611 males and 9,139 females. The district had 3,162 households, with an average household size of 5.5 persons. According to the 2008 census, the population had increased to 24,335, including 11,748 males and 12,587 females. The district had 4,802 households, with an average household size of 5.0 persons. As per the 2019 census, the population was 29,154, including 14,202 males and 14,952 females. The district had 6,809 households, with an average household size of 4.3 persons.

== Economy ==
According to the 2008 census, approximately 96% of families in the district were engaged primarily in agriculture, accounting for 4,361 families. About 4,317 of these families were primarily engaged in rice cultivation. The remaining families were engaged in services (3%), trade (1%), and other occupations. In 2008, during the wet-season, approximately 3,649 ha (9,020 acres) of the land area was under rice cultivation, while an additional 2,402 ha (5,940 acres) of land was under rice cultivation in the uplands.

Other occupations include traditional handicraft activities including rattan basket-making, mat weaving, incense production, and the manufacture of traditional musical instruments. The district hosts the Institute for Khmer Traditional Textiles, a silk-weaving centre established with the assistance of Government of Japan, and supports traditional Khmer silk-weaving techniques.
