= Kampong Phluk =

Kampong Phluk កំពង់ភ្លុក
- Commune
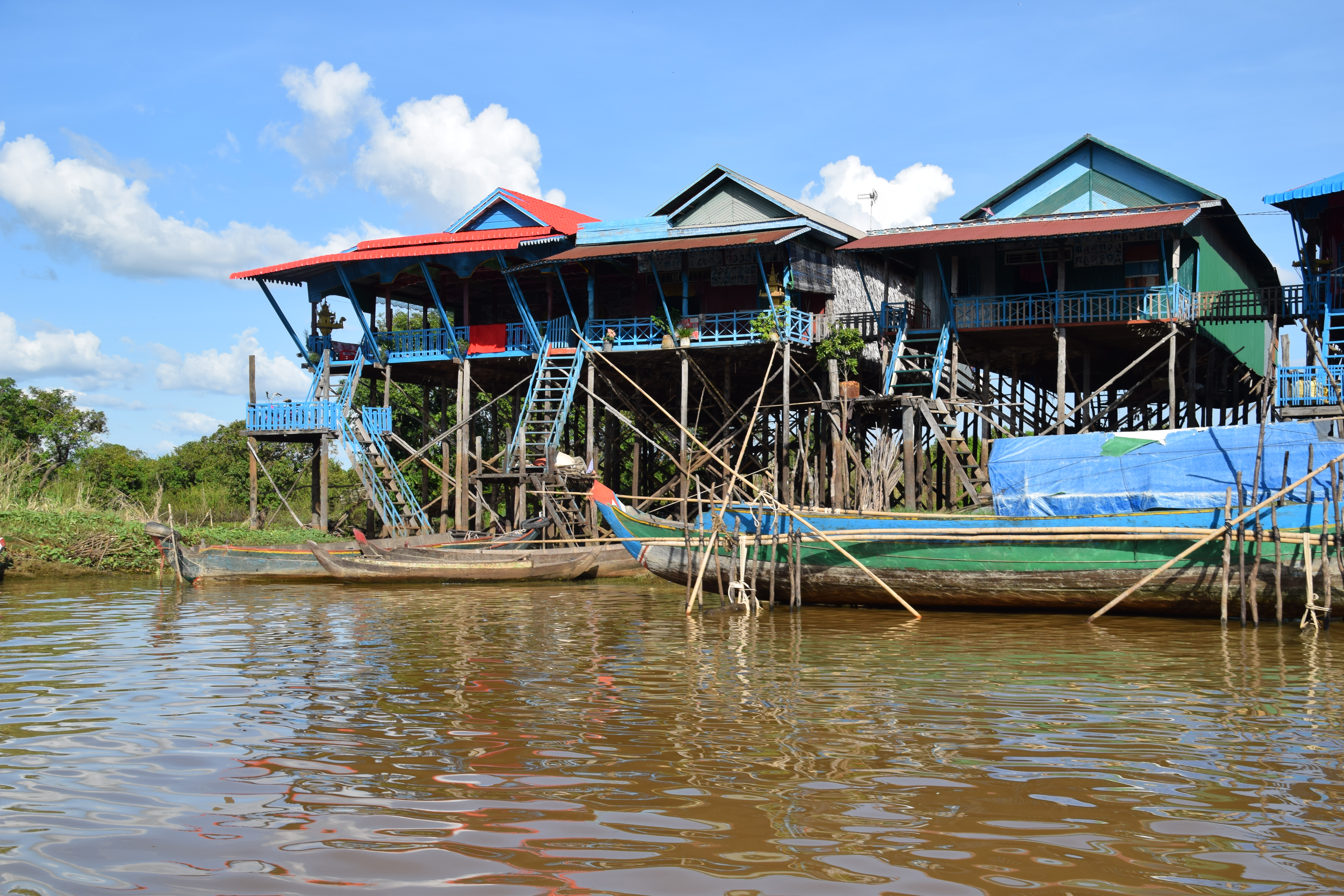
- Houses on the water in Kampong Phlouk

- Location within Cambodia
- Coordinates: 13.209°N 103.9736°E
- Country: Cambodia
- Province: Siem Reap Province
- District: Prasat Bakong District

Population (2019)
  - Total: 3,707

Kampong Phluk (Khmer: កំពង់ភ្លុក) is a commune in Prasat Bakong District in Siem Reap Province Cambodia. The name means "Harbor of the Tusks". The community largely depends on fishing for survival, primarily shrimp, spending Cambodia's wet season (May–October) fishing.

Many houses and buildings are constructed on stilts ranging from 6 m to 9 m to accommodate the changes in water level between wet and dry seasons.

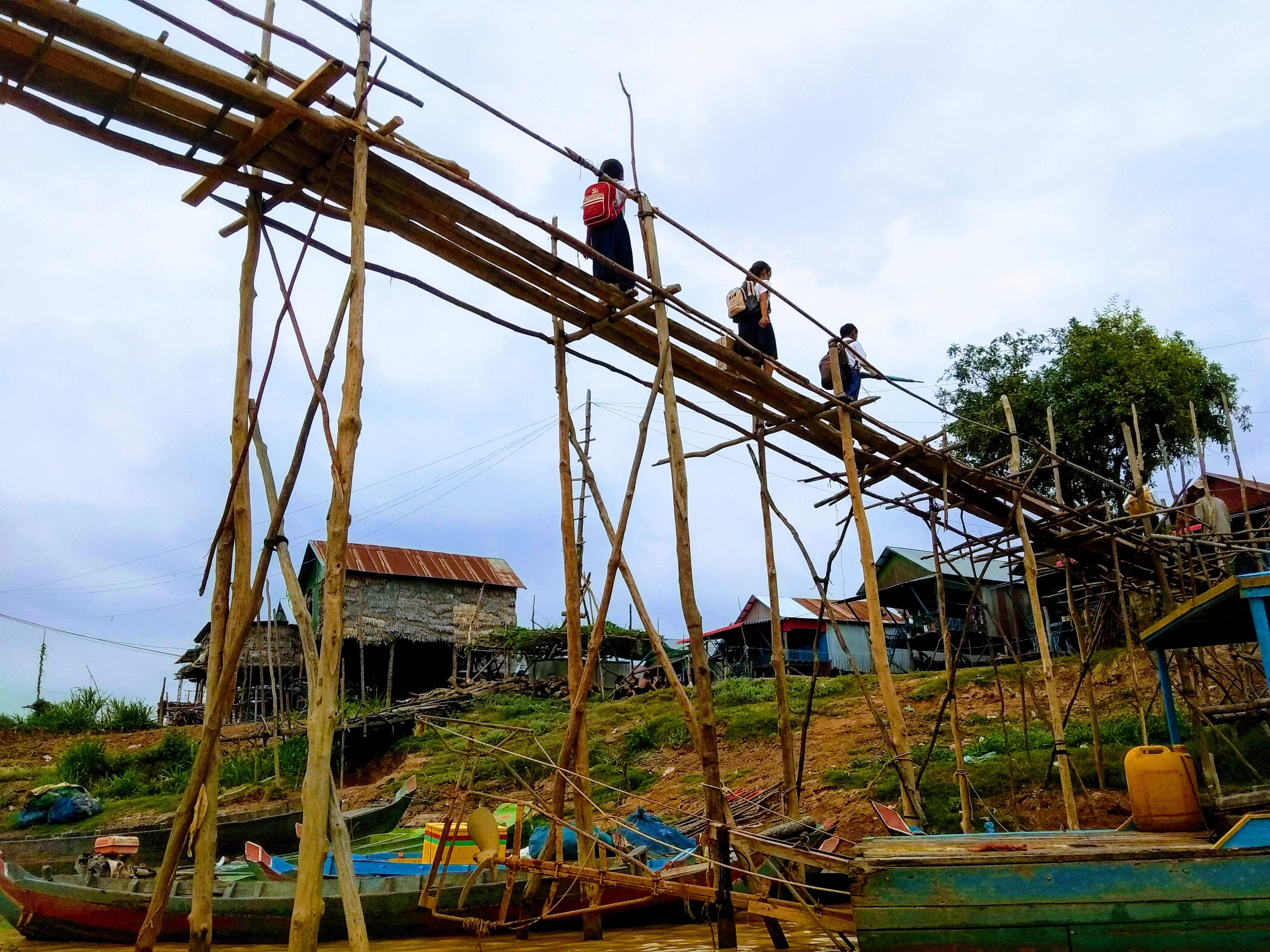
How pupils go to school in Kampung Phluk

During the dry season (November–April) as the river thins due to receding water, many turn to farming to supplement their income. Tourism, which started in the village approximately 10 years ago, is also a growing part of the local economy.

As of 2019, the commune has 911 families with a total population of 3,707. The commune consist of three villages: Tnaot Kambot (ត្នោតកំបុត), Dey Krahom (ដីក្រហម), and Kok Kdol (គោគក្ដុល).

== Gallery ==
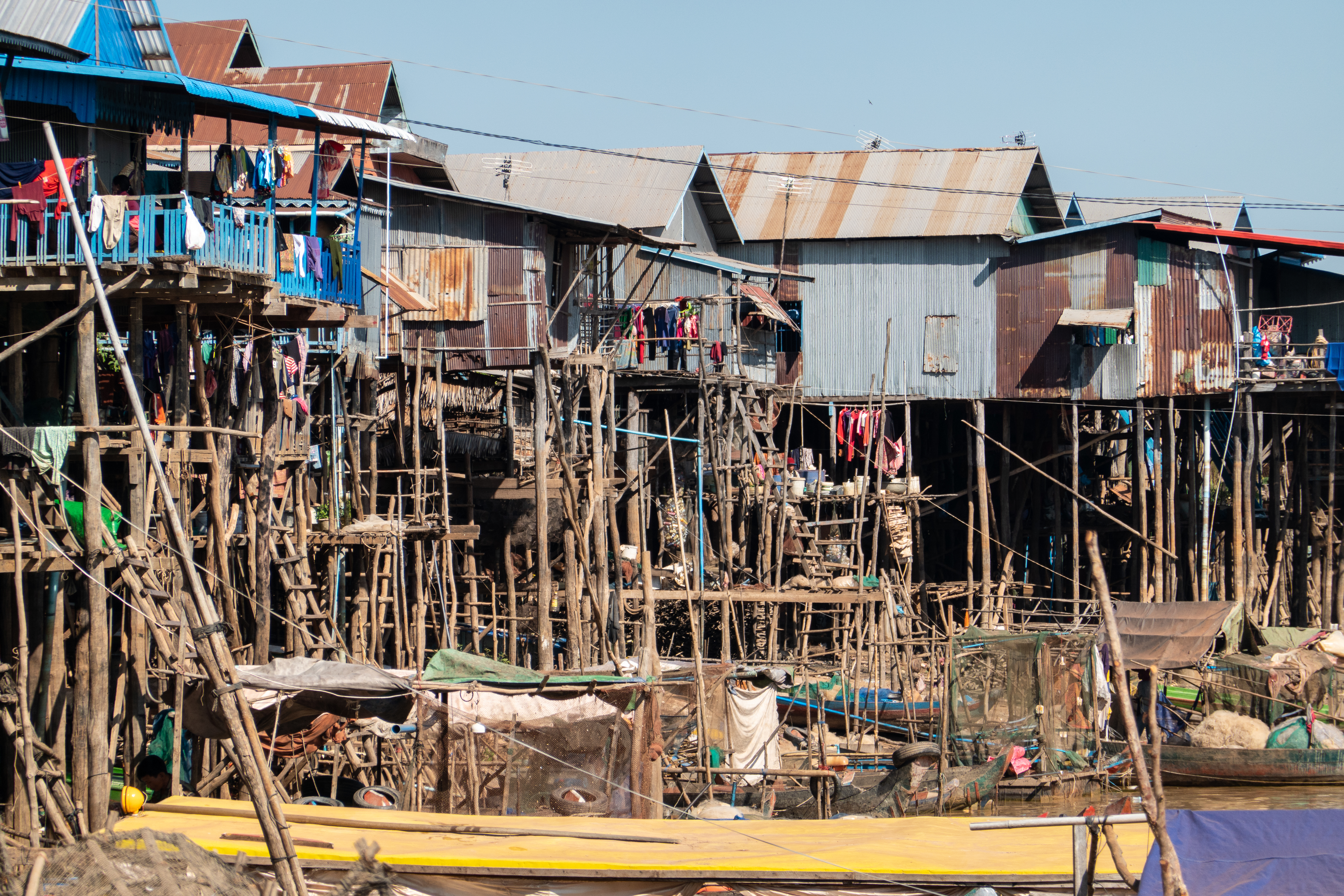

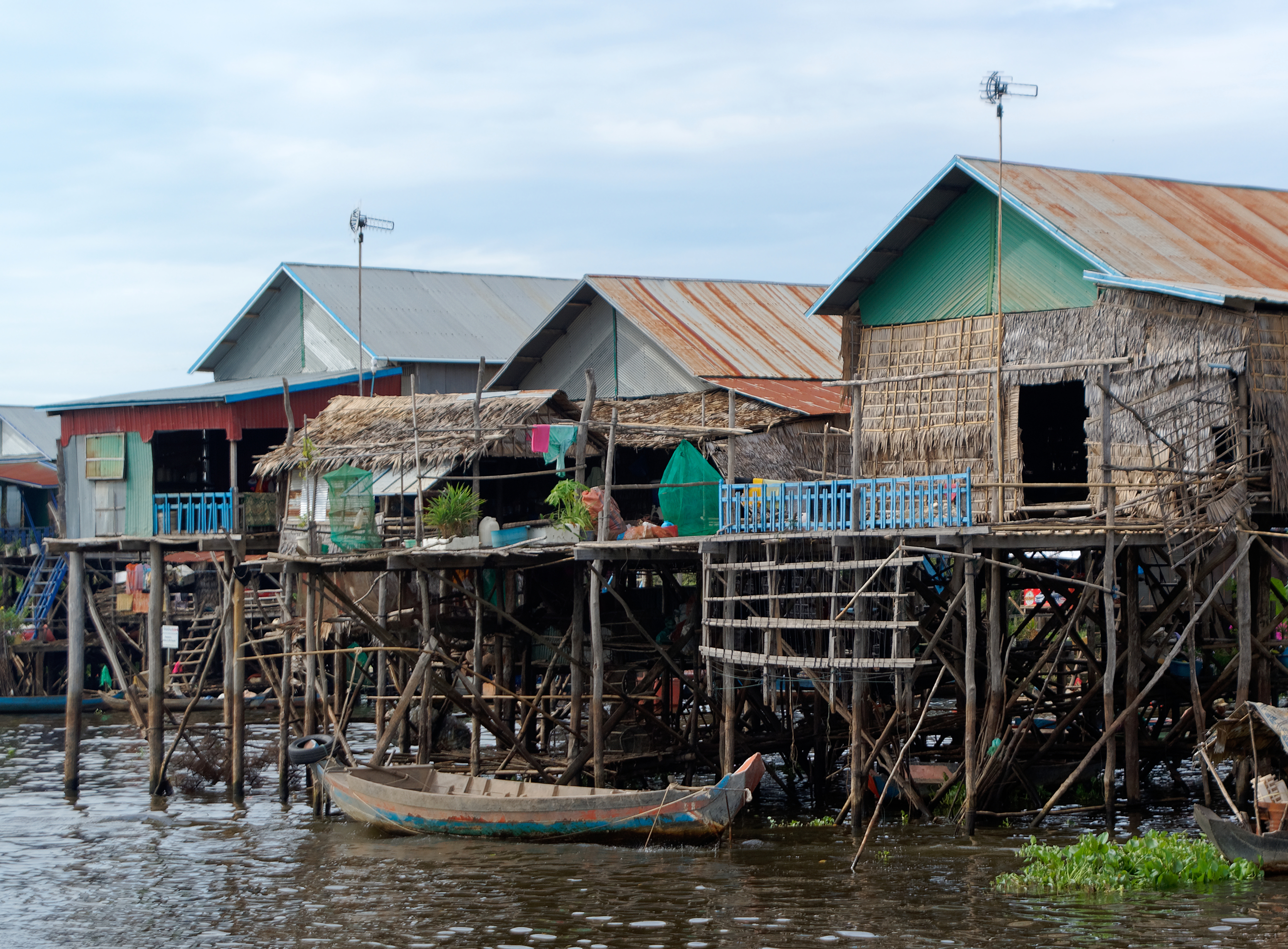

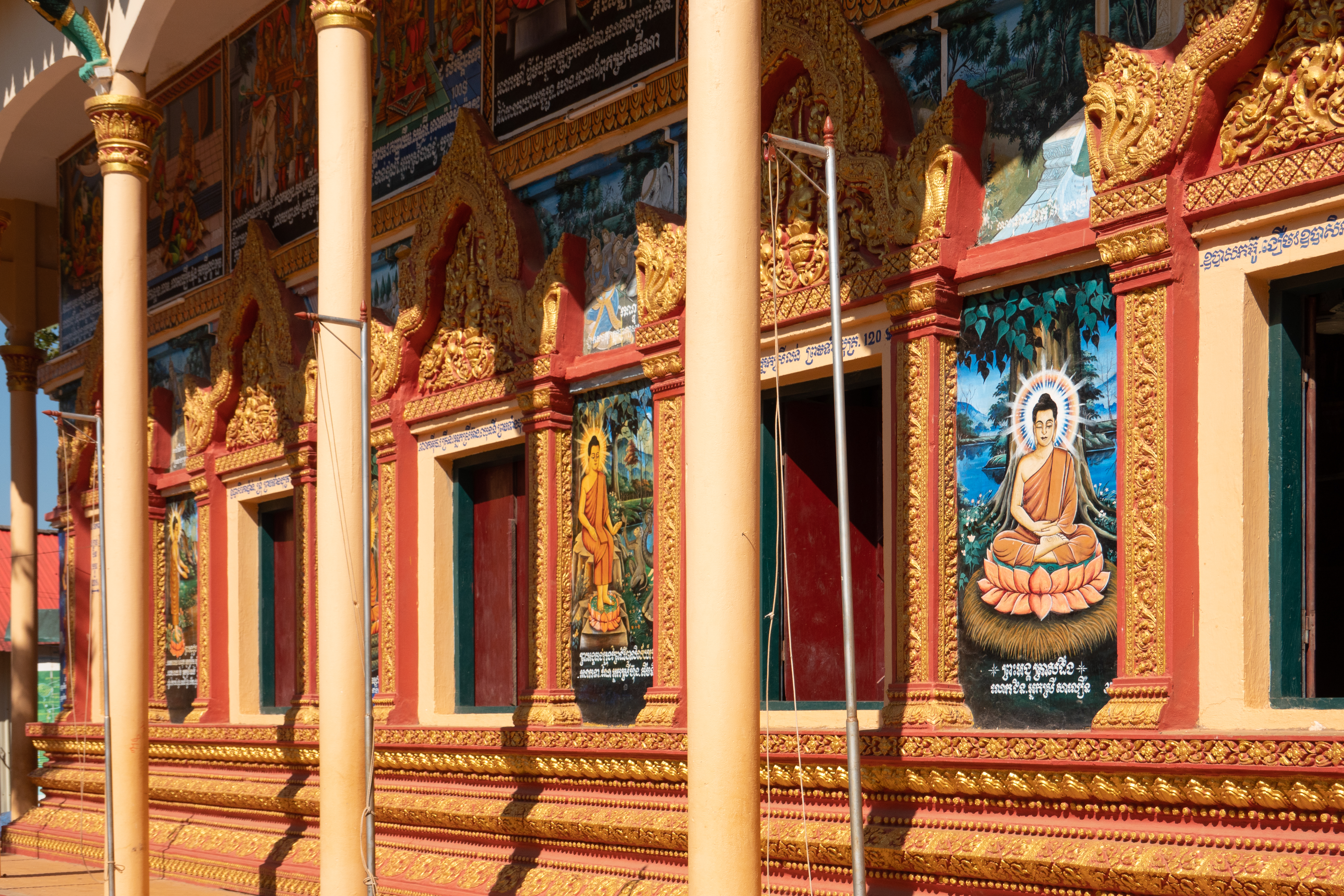

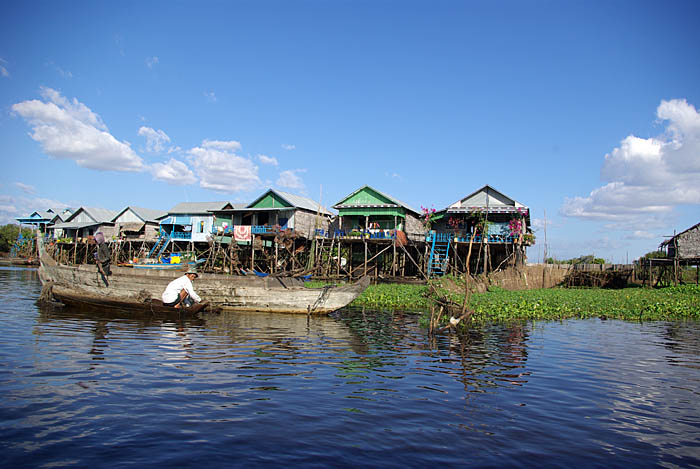

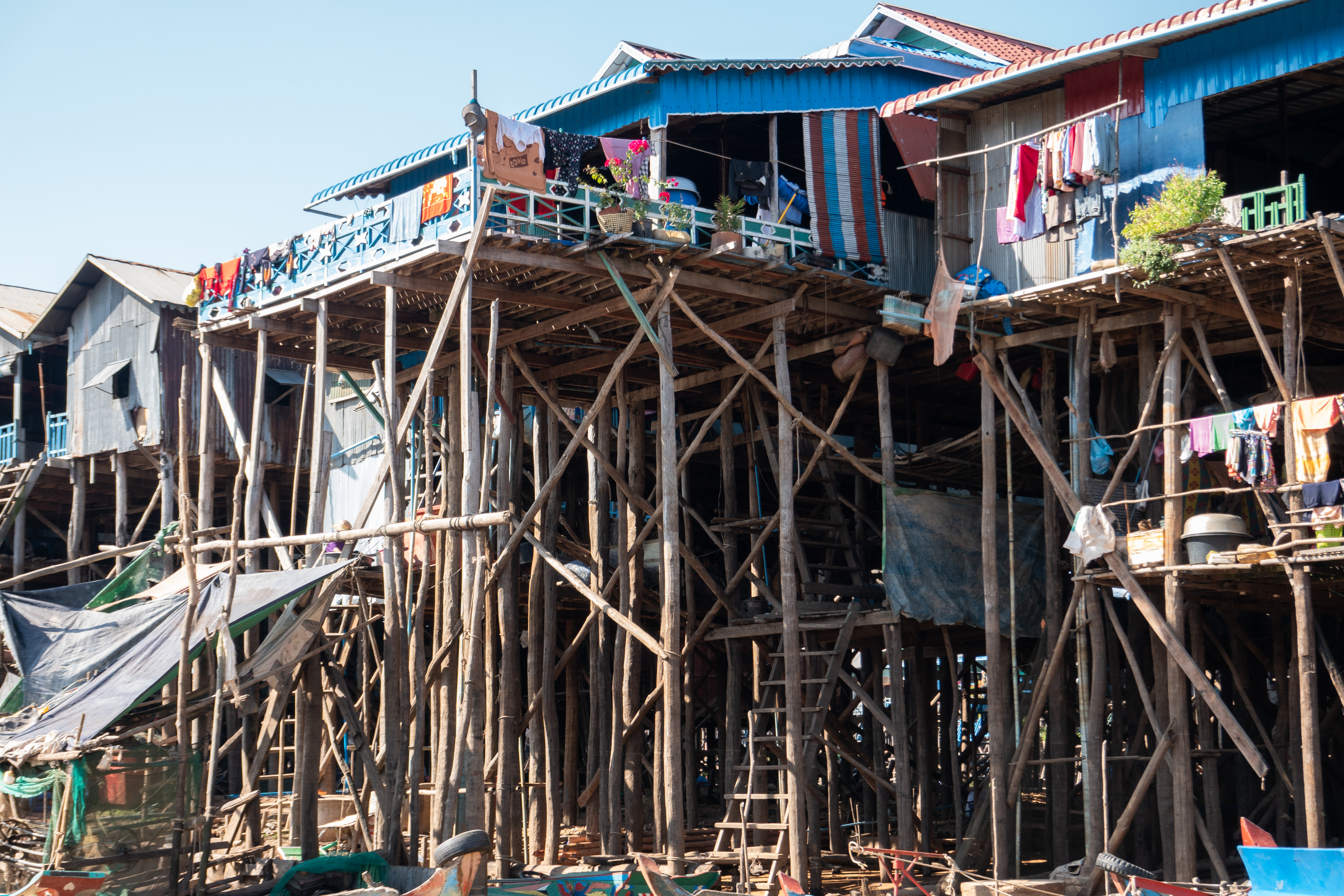

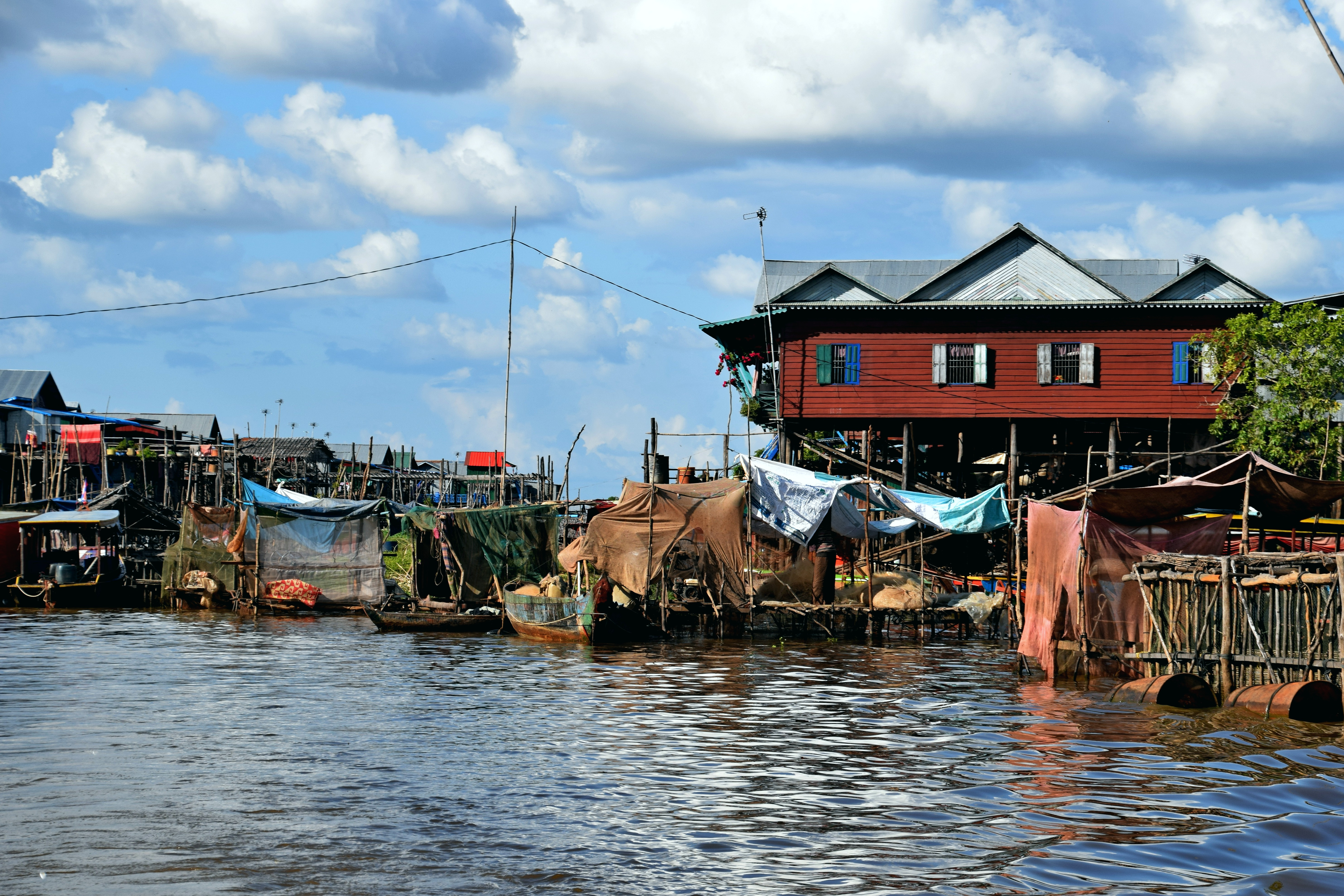

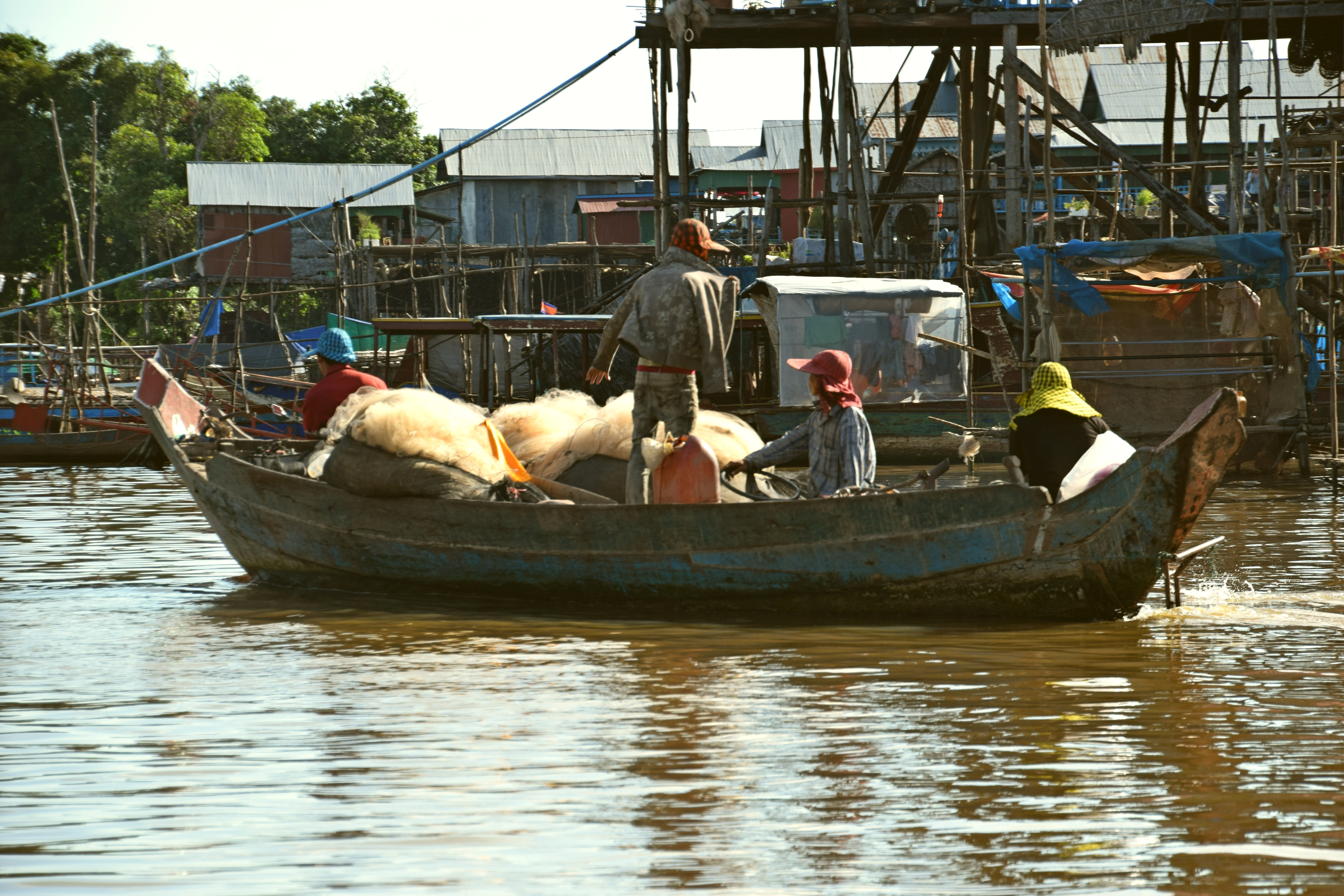

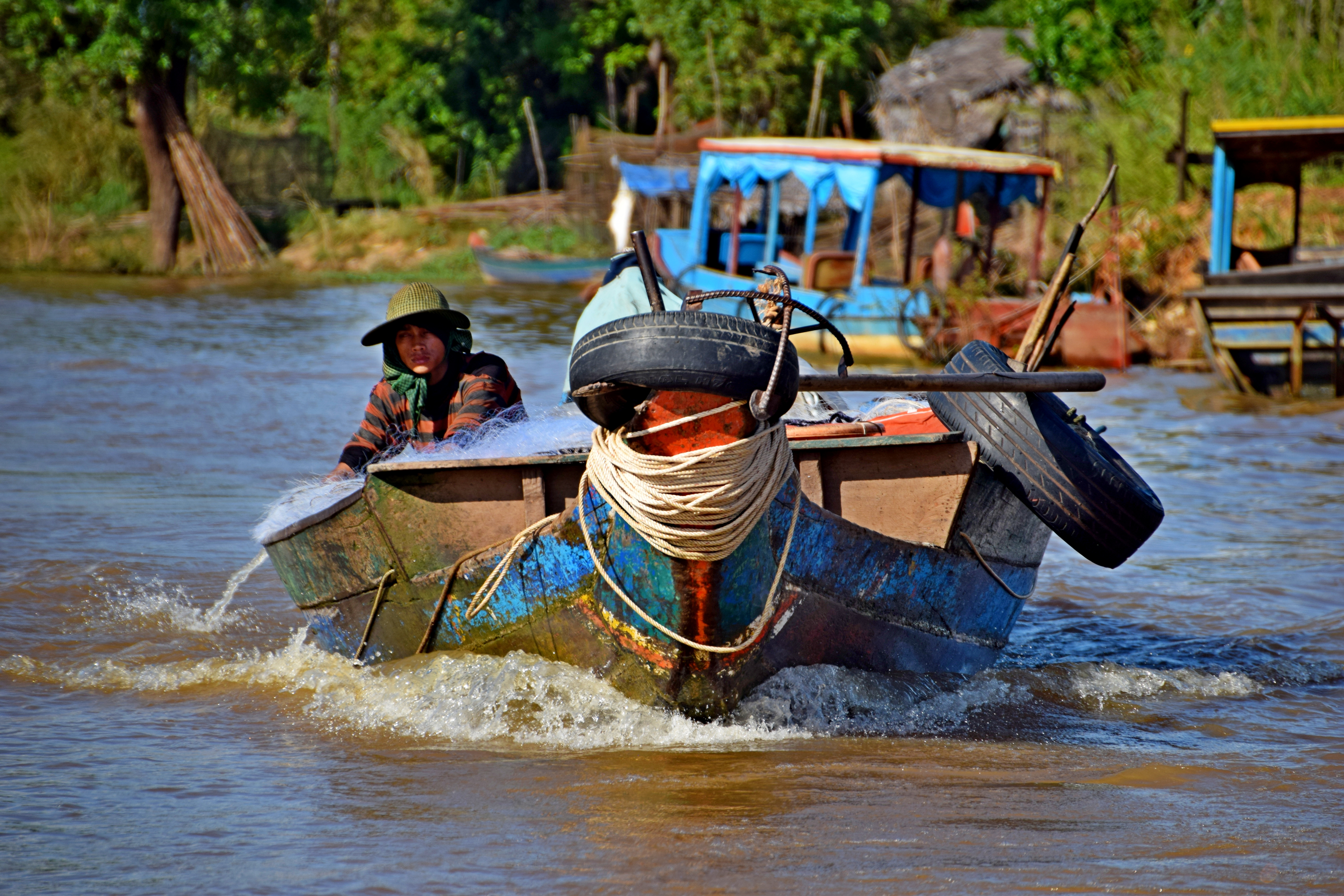

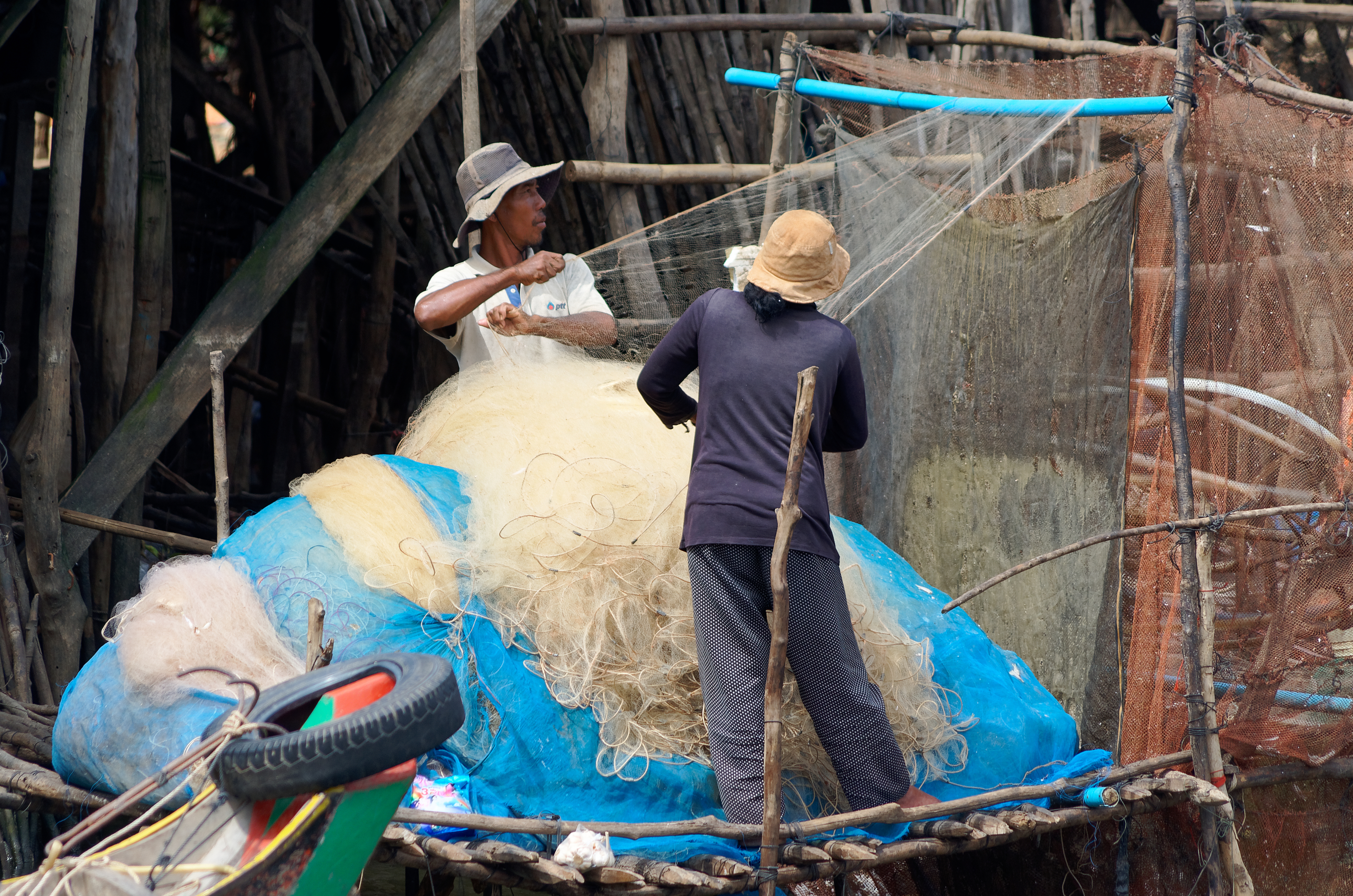

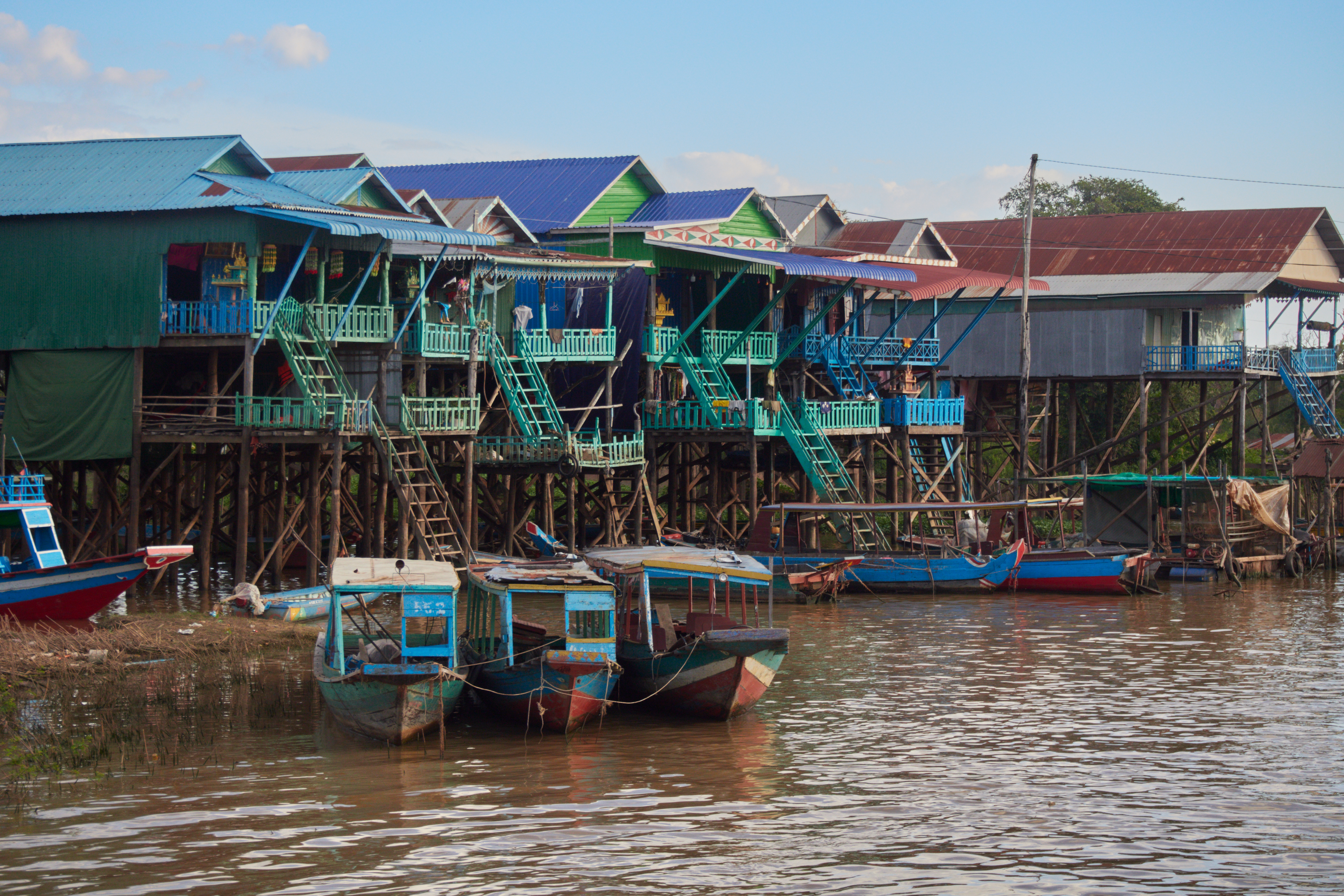

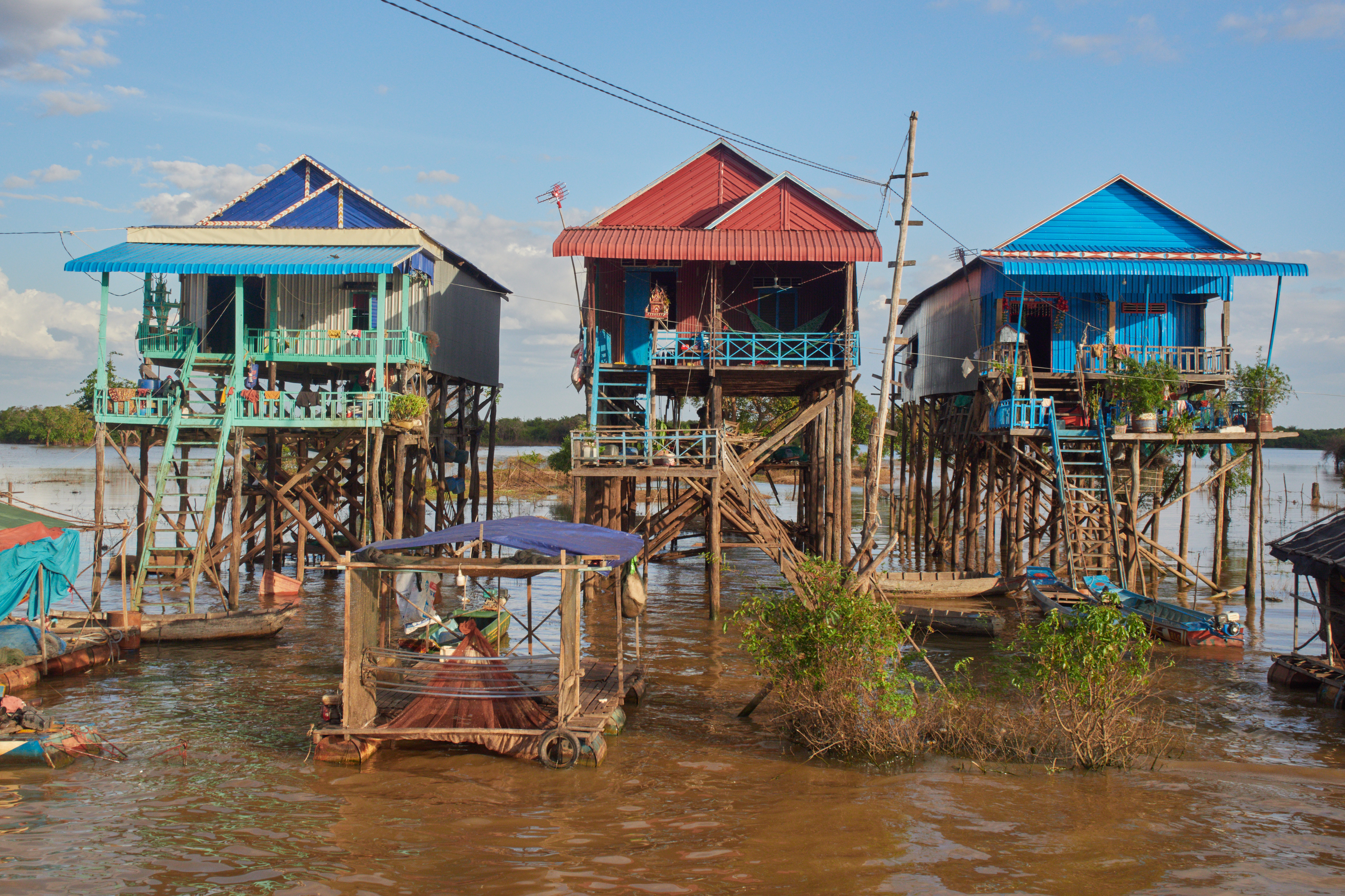
