= Roluos =

Roluos ឃុំរលួស
- Commune
- Location within Cambodia
- Coordinates: 13°48′17″N 102°57′53″E
- Country: Cambodia
- Province: Banteay Meanchey
- District: Svay Chek District
- Villages: 7
- Time zone: UTC+07

Roluos, also Phumi Roluos Chas, is a small town and khum (commune) of Svay Chek District in Banteay Meanchey Province in north-western Cambodia. It is located on road 56, 24 kilometres (15 mi) north of Sisophon.

== Villages ==
- Baek Chan Thmei
- Khvav Kaeut
- Stueng
- Ta Ong Kaeut
- Slaeng
- Roluos
- Ta Sman

== See also ==
- Roluos (temples) - the early Angkor temples known as the "Roluos group" are located in another village with the same name, part of the district of Prasat Bakong, in the province of Siem Reap.
