= Banteay Srei district =

Banteay Srei ស្រុកបន្ទាយស្រី
- District (srok)
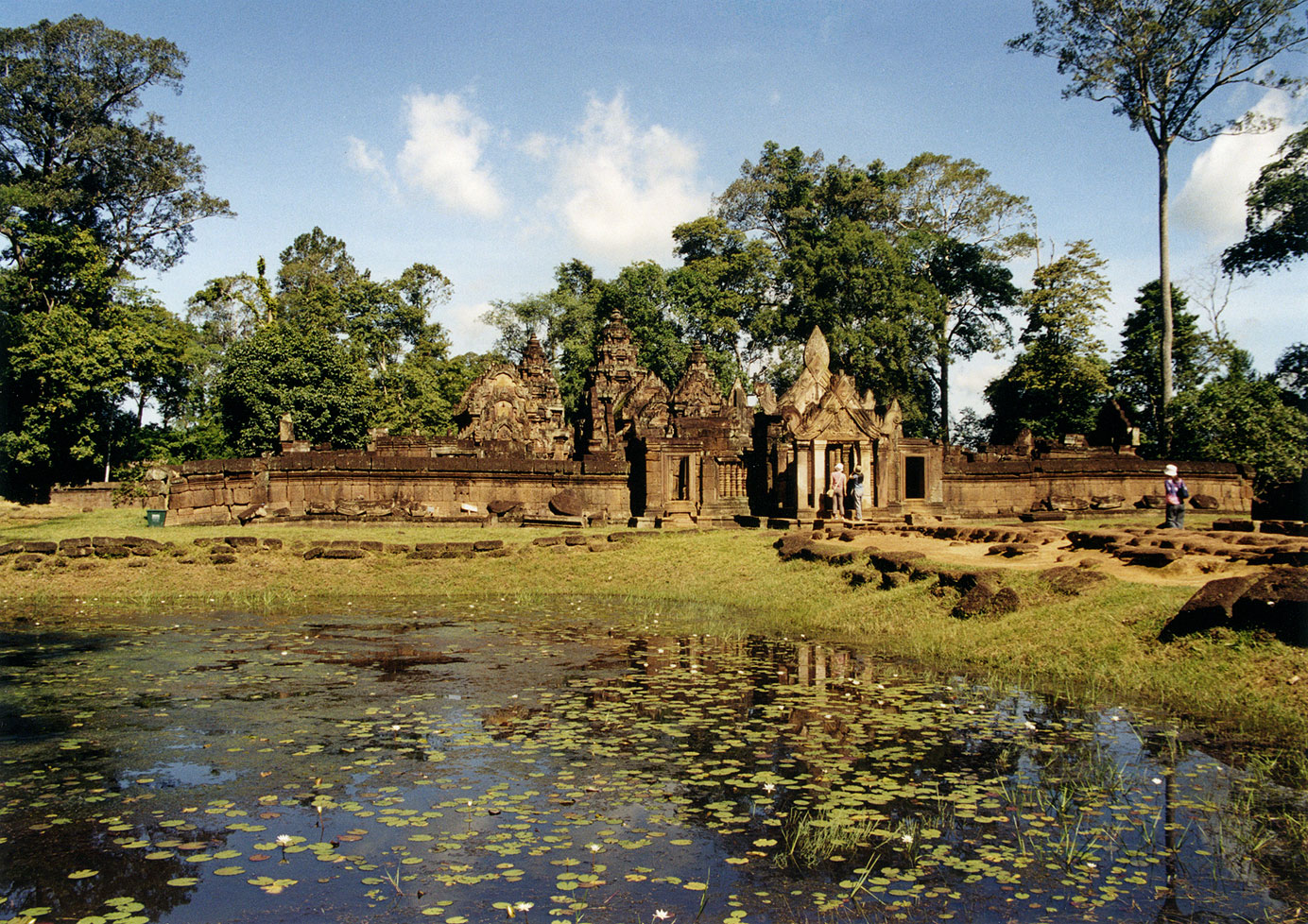
- Banteay Srei

- District location in Siem Reap province
- Coordinates: 13°26′N 103°51′E
- Country: Cambodia
- Province: Siem Reap
- Communes: 5
- Villages: 29

Area
  - Total: 600.72 km^{2} (231.94 sq mi)

Population (2019)
  - Total: 43,738
- Time zone: +7
- Geocode: 1703

Banteay Srei (Khmer: ស្រុកបន្ទាយស្រី, literally "Women's Fortress") is a district in Siem Reap Province, Cambodia. It covers an area of approximately 600.72 km^{2} (231.94 sq mi) and had a population of 43,738 in 2019. It is subdivided into five communes and 29 villages. The Banteay Srei and Banteay Samre temples are located in the district.

== Geography ==
Banteay Srei is one of the districts (srok) of Siem Reap province, Cambodia. It covered a total area of approximately 600.72 km^{2} (231.94 sq mi), of which 22.69 km^{2} (8.76 sq mi) was classified as forest land, 66.64 km^{2} (25.73 sq mi) as cultivation land, 136.36 km^{2} (52.65 sq mi) as construction land, and 375.03 km^{2} (144.80 sq mi) as others in 2009.

== Administrative divisions ==
The district is headed by a district governor. Banteay Sreo District is subdivided into four communes (khum) – Khnar Sanday, Khun Ream, Preah Dak, Rumchek, and Tbaeng. The district administration office is located approximately 0.05 km (0.031 mi) from the commune office of Khnar Sanday, 11 km (6.8 mi) from Khun Ream, 19 km (12 mi) from Preah Dak, 15 km (9.3 mi) from Rumchek, and 12 km (7.5 mi) from Tbaeng. The communes are administered by commune councils headed by commune chiefs, elected directly for five-year terms. The five communes are further subdivided into 29 villages (phum).

Administrative divisions
Code	Commune	Khmer	Villages
170301	Khnar Sanday	ខ្នារសណ្តាយ	Banteay Srei (បន្ទាយស្រី), Khnar (ខ្នារ), Prei (ប្រីយ៍), Sanday (សណ្ដាយ), Kakaoh Chrum (កកោះជ្រុំ), Tuol Kralanh (ទួលក្រឡាញ់)
170302	Khun Ream	ឃុនរាម	Khnar Rongveas (ខ្នារង្វាស), Kam Prohm (កំព្រហ្ម), Khun Ream (ឃុនរាម), Chhuk Sa (ឈូកស), Tuol Kruos (ទួលគ្រួស), Trapeang Thma (ត្រពាំងថ្ម), Peung Chhatr (ពើងឆ័ត្រ)
170303	Preah Dak	ព្រះដាក់	Preah Dak (ព្រះដាក់), Thnal Bandaoy (ថ្នល់បណ្តោយ), Tatrai (តាត្រៃ), Thnal Totueng (ថ្នល់ទទឹង), Ta Koh (តាកុះ), Ou Totueng (អូរទទឹង)
170304	Rumchek	រំចេក	Rumchek (រំចេក), Sala Kravan (សាលាក្រវ៉ាន់), Rovieng Tatum (រវៀងតាទុំ)
170305	Tbeng	ត្បែង	Tbeng Kaeut (ត្បែងកើត), Tbaeng Lich (ត្បែងលិច), Wat (វត្ត), Srah Khvav (ស្រះខ្វាវ), Kulen Thmey (គូលែនថ្មី), Skon (ស្គន់), Thma Chol (ថ្មជល់)

== Demographics ==
According to the 1998 census, Banteay Srei District had a population of 32,271, including 16,736 males and 15,535 females. The district had 5,936 households, with an average household size of 5.2 persons. According to the 2008 census, the population had increased to 42,773, including 21,726 males and 21,047 females. The district had 8,359 households, with an average household size of 5.0 persons. As per the 2019 census, the population was 43,738, including 21,503 males and 22,235 females. The district had 10,130 households, with an average household size of 4.3 persons.

== Economy ==
In 2008, approximately 97% of families in the district were engaged primarily in agriculture, accounting for 10,766 families. About 10,764 of these families were primarily engaged in rice cultivation. The remaining families were engaged in services (1%), trade (1%), and other occupations. In 2008, rice was cultivated across 8,275 ha (20,450 acres) during the wet season and 70 ha (170 acres) during the dry season. Other crops cultivated in the district include maize, mung bean, peanut, cassava, sweet potato, soy bean, and sesame. Other activities include palm jaggery production, and handicrafts like basket weaving, wood carving, and production of puppets.

== Culture ==
The Banteay Srei and Banteay Samre temples are located in the district. Banteay Srei is a Hindu temple dedicated to Shiva, that was built in the 10th century using sandstone and laterite, while Banteay Samre dates to the 12th century.

The district also hosts the Angkor Centre for the Conservation of Biodiversity, a wildlife rescue centre, and a butterfly park. The Cambodia Landmine Museum displays various landmines used during the Cambodian Civil War.
