= Prasat Bakong District =

Prasat Bakong District ស្រុកប្រាសាទបាគង
- District (srok)
- District location in Siem Reap Province
- Coordinates: 13°20′26.5″N 103°59′8.9″E
- Country: Cambodia
- Province: Siem Reap
- Time zone: UTC+7 (ICT)
- Geocode: 1709

'Prasat Bakong District' Bakong District is a district located in Siem Reap Province, in north-west Cambodia. According to the 1998 census of Cambodia, it had a population of 54,129.

== See also ==
- Roluos (temples) - the three early Angkor temples known as the "Roluos group" are located to the north-west of the village of this name (not to be confused with Roluos, in the Svay Chek District, Banteay Meanchey Province), in the western part of the district and 13 km east of the provincial capital of Siem Reap.

== Administrative divisions ==
Code Commune	Commune	Language Khmer	Village
170901	Ampil Commune	ឃុំអំពិល	គោកចាន់(Kouk Chan), ថ្នល់បាក់(Thnal Bak), ត្នោត(Tnaot), ត្រពាំងរុន(Trapeang Runn), តាប៉ាង(Ta Pang), ព្រៃគុយ(Prey Kuy), បង្កោង(Bangkaong), គីរីមានន្ទ(Kiri Meanon), បុស្សធំ(Bos Thum), ត្រាចជ្រុំ (Trach Chrum)
170902	Bakong Commune	ឃុំបាគង	ថ្នល់ត្រង់(Thnal Trang), ឱឡោក(Aolaok), លលៃ(Loley), ស្ទឹង(Stueng), គោកត្រាច(Kouk Trach), តាភោគ(Ta Phouk)
170903	Ballangk Commune	ឃុំបល្ល័ង្គ	ធ្លកកំបុត(Thlok Kambot), គោកប្ញស្សី(Kouk Ruessei), ស្នារសង្រ្កាម(Snar Sangkream), ក្រពើ(Krapeu), តាកុយ(Ta Koy), ព្រុំកុដិ(Prum Kod), ត្រាច(Trach), ពពេល(Popel)
170904	Kampong Phluk Commune	ឃុំកំពង់ភ្លុក	គោកក្តុល(Kouk Kdol), ត្នោតកំបុត(Tnaot Kambot), ដីក្រហម(Dei Kraham)
170905	Kantreang	ឃុំកន្ទ្រាំង	អង្រ្កង(Angkrong), កន្រ្ទាំង(Kantreang), ស្រិតលិច(Sret Khang Lech), ស្រិតកើត(Sret Khang Kaeut), សូភី(Souphi), ត្រពាំងថ្នល់(Trapeang Thnal), តាត្រាវ(Ta Trav), ពង្រ(PongRor)
170906	Kandaek	ឃុំកណ្តែក	គោកធ្លក(Kouk Thlok), ត្រពាំងទឹម(Trapeang Tuem), ឃុនមោក(Khun Moukh), ច្រេស(Chres), អូរ(Ou), ស្ពានកែ្អក(Spean K'aek), ត្រាង(Trang), ជ្រៃ(Chrey), គោកត្នោត(Kouk Tnaot), ល្អក់(L'ak)
170907	Mean Chey Commune	ឃុំមានជ័យ	ត្រពាំងធំ(Trapeang Thum), តាប្រាក់(Ta Prak), ដូននំ(Doun Num), ជាស្មន់(Chea Sman), បន្ទាយប្ញស្សី(Banteay Ruessei), កំពង់ថ្កូវ(Kampong Thkov)
170908	Roluos Commune	ឃុំរលួស	មមាញ(Momeanh), គោកស្រុក(Kouk Srok), កញ្ជរ(Kanhchor), រលួសកើត(Roluos Khang Kaeut), ចំបក់(Chambak), ដូនទាវ(Doun Teav), រលួសលិច(Roluos Khang Lech)
170909	Trapeang Thom Commune	ឃុំត្រពាំងធំ	កូនសត្វ(Koun Satv), បឹងជុំ(Boeng Chum), តាអី(Ta Ei), រកាកំបុត(Roka Kambot), សួង(Suong), ភ្នំដី(Phnum Dei), ល្វា(Lvea), ស្វាយជ័យ(Svay Chey), អន្លង់ពីរ(Anlong Pir)
