= Angkor Chum District =

Angkor Chum ស្រុកអង្គរជុំ
- District (srok)
- District location in Siem Reap Province
- Coordinates: 14°10′N 104°20′E
- Country: Cambodia
- Province: Siem Reap

Area
  - Total: 479.03 km^{2} (184.95 sq mi)

Population (2019)
  - Total: 55,176
- Time zone: +7
- Geocode: 1701

Angkor Chum District (Khmer: ស្រុកអង្គរជុំ, literally "City of the Periphery" ) is a district in Siem Reap Province, Cambodia. It covers an area of approximately 479.03 km^{2} (184.95 sq mi) and had a population of 55,176 in 2019. It is subdivided into seven communes and 86 villages.

== Geography ==
Angkor Thum is one of the districts (srok) of Siem Reap province, Cambodia. Located in the northwestern part of the province, it covered a total area of approximately 479.03 km^{2} (184.95 sq mi). In 2009, 221.97 km^{2} (85.70 sq mi) of the land area was occupied by forests, 202.74 km^{2} (78.28 sq mi) was classified as cultivable land, and 11.22 km^{2} (4.33 sq mi) as built-up land. One of the notable geographical features in the district is Poeung Tanon, a hill with distinctive rock formations.

== Administration ==
The district is headed by a district governor. Angkor Chum District is subdivided into seven communes (khum) – Char Chhuk, Doun Peng, Kouk Doung, Koul, Nokor Pheas, Srae Khvav, and Ta Saom. The district administration office is located approximately 1.5 km (0.93 mi) from the commune office of Char Chhuk, 4 km (2.5 mi) from Doun Peng, 17.4 km (10.8 mi) from Kouk Doung, 7 km (4.3 mi) from Koul, 11.5 km (7.1 mi) from Nokor Pheas, 11 km (6.8 mi) from Srae Khvav, and 4 km (2.5 mi) from Ta Saom. The communes are administered by commune councils headed by commune chiefs, elected directly for five-year terms. The four communes are further subdivided into 86 villages (phum). Char Chhuk has 20 villages, Doun Peng has eight, Kouk Doung has 17, Koul has seven, Nokor Pheas has ten, Srae Khvav has 11, and Ta Saom has 13.

== Demographics ==
According to the 1998 census, Angkor Chum District had a population of 48,476, including 22,671 males and 25,805 females. The district had 9,091 households, with an average household size of 5.3 persons. According to the 2008 census, the population had increased to 53,768, including 25,239 males and 28,529 females. The district had 11,329 households, with an average household size of 4.7 persons. As per the 2019 census, the population was 55,176, including 25,867 males and 29,309 females. The district had 13,320 households, with an average household size of 4.1 persons..

== Economy ==
The economy is dependent on agriculture and animal husbandry. According to the 2008 census, approximately 97% of families in the district were engaged primarily in agriculture, accounting for 10,766 families. About 10,764 of these families were primarily engaged in rice cultivation. The remaining families were engaged in services (1%), trade (1%), and other occupations. In 2008, rice was cultivated across 18,730 ha (46,300 acres) during the wet season, and the rice production was approximately 26,088 tonnes. Other crops cultivated in the district include maize, mung bean, peanut, cassava, sweet potato, and sesame.
