= Varin district =

Varin ស្រុកវ៉ារិន
- District (srok)
- District location in Siem Reap province
- Coordinates: 13°45′N 103°55′E
- Country: Cambodia
- Province: Siem Reap
- Time zone: +7
- Geocode: 1714

Varin is a district located in Siem Reap province, in north-west Cambodia. According to the 1998 census of Cambodia, it had a population of 19,818.

== Administrative divisions ==
VarinIs a district in Siem Reap. The district has 5 communes and 29 villages.

Code Commune	Commune	Language Khmer	Village
171401	Prasat Commune	ឃុំប្រាសាទ	កញ្ចន់រុន, ទំនាបស្វាយ, កាប់ដៃ, ប្រាសាទ, វៀន
171402	Lvea Krang Commune	ឃុំល្វាក្រាំង	គោកចាន់, អូរទៃ, គោកកណ្តាល
171403	Srae Nouy Commune	ឃុំស្រែណូយ	ស្រែណូយ, ស្រែពោធិ៍, ល្វាក្រាំង, គោកវត្ត, សមុទ្រ, វត្ត, ព្រៃខ្នុល
171404	Svay Sor Commune	ឃុំស្វាយស	អូរ, ស្វាយស, ប្ញស្សីធំ, ប្ញស្សីតូច, កំបោរ, ចារ
171405	Varin Commune	ឃុំវ៉ារិន	នេល, រំដួល, វ៉ារិន, គោកភ្នំ, គោកស្រុក, ទួលមាឌ, គោកគ្រួស
