= Siem Reap province =

Province of Cambodia

Siem Reap Province ខេត្តសៀមរាប
- Province

Khmer transcription(s)
  - Khmer: ខេត្តសៀមរាប
  - UNGEGN: Khaet Siam Riap
  - ALA-LC: Khett Siam Rāp
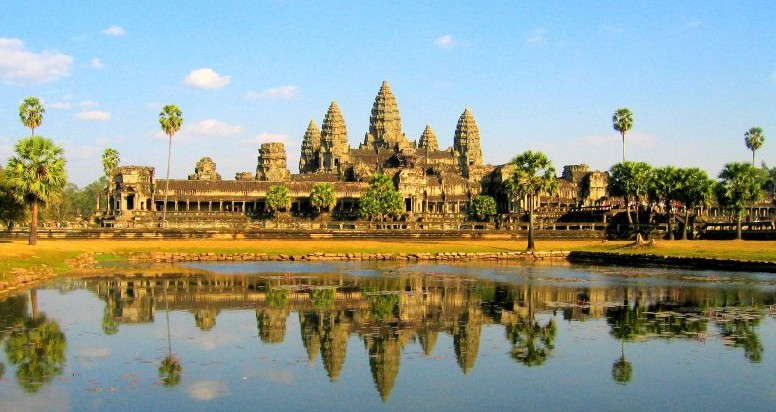
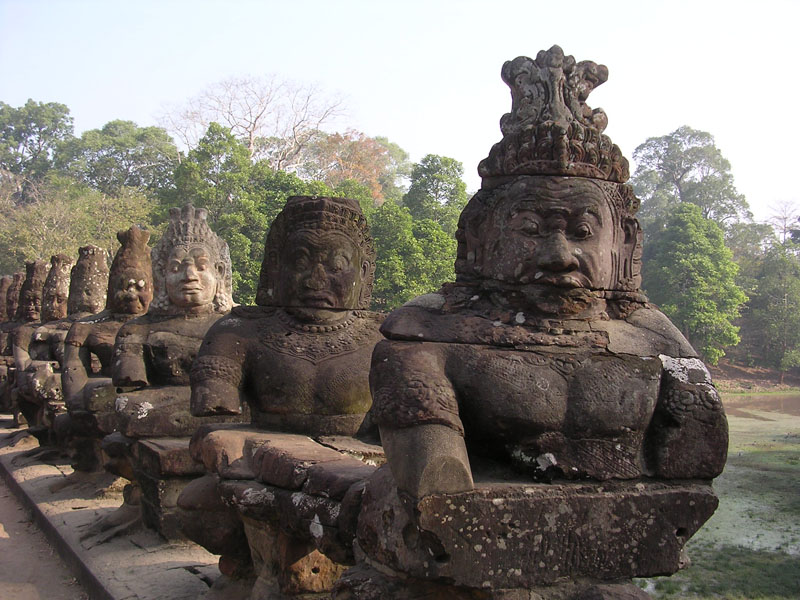
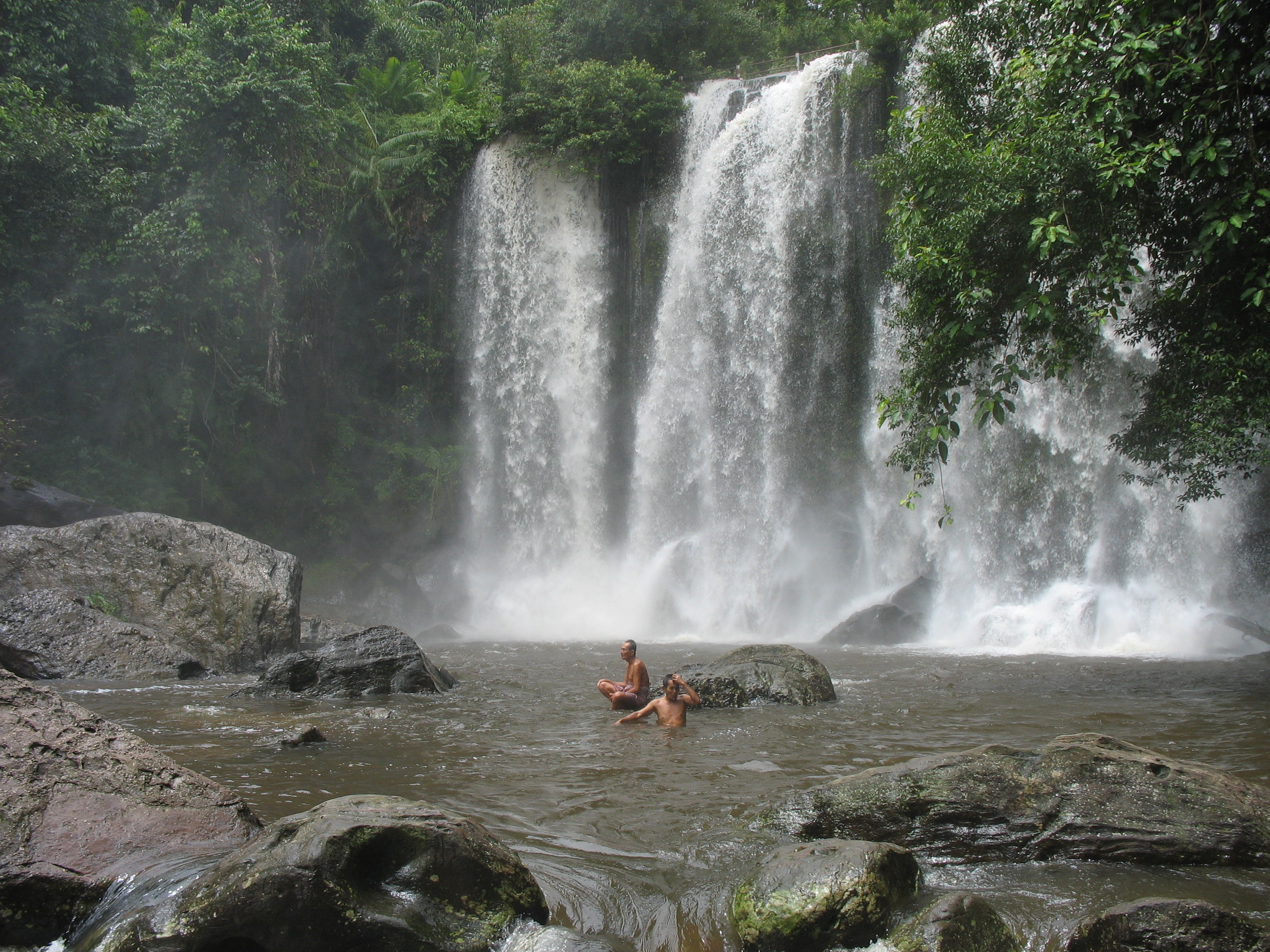
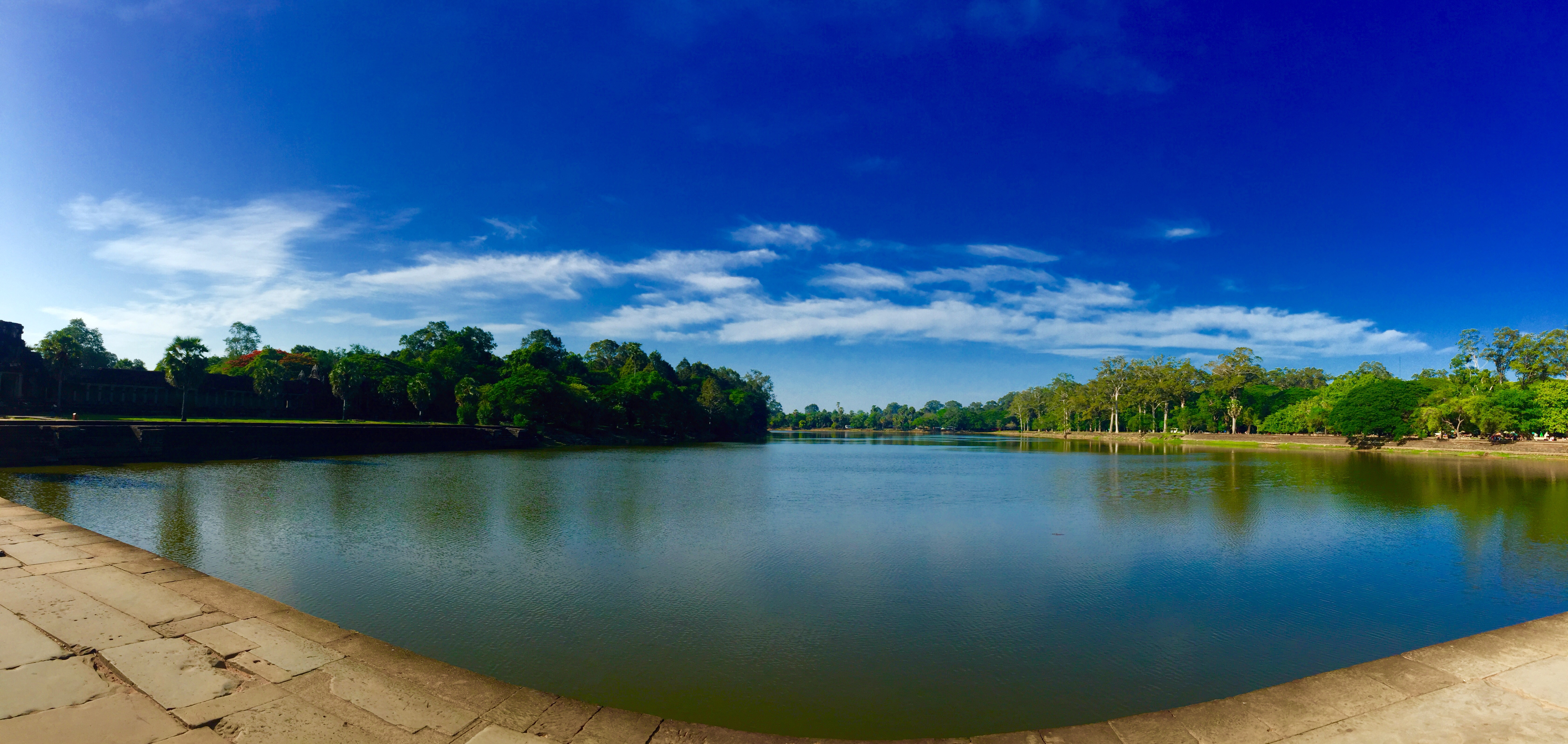
- From top: Angkor Wat, South Gate of Angkor Thom, Phnom Kulen waterfall, moat of Angkor

- Seal
- Nickname: Gateway to Angkor
- Map of Cambodia highlighting Siem Reap
- Coordinates: 13°21′N 103°51′E
- Country: Cambodia
- Settled: 802
- Provincial status: 23 December 1907
- Capital: Siem Reap and Run Ta Aek
- Subdivisions: 2 municipalities; 11 districts

Government
  - Governor: Prak Sophoan (CPP)
  - National Assembly: 6 / 125

Area
  - Total: 10,299 km^{2} (3,976 sq mi)
  - Rank: 10th

Population (2024)
  - Total: ▼1,099,825
  - Rank: 5th
  - Density: 98/km^{2} (250/sq mi)
  - Rank: 13th
- Demonym: Siem Reaper(s)
- Time zone: UTC+07:00 (ICT)
- ISO 3166 code: KH-17
- Website: www.siemreap.gov.kh

Siem Reap Province, (Khmer: សៀមរាប, Khaet Siam Riap, [siəm riəp]; lit. 'defeat of Siam'), is a province of northwestern Cambodia. It borders the provinces of Oddar Meanchey to the north, Preah Vihear and Kampong Thom to the east, Battambang to the south, and Banteay Meanchey to the west. Its capital and largest city is Siem Reap.

Siem Reap province is the tenth largest province in Cambodia. Having reached a population of one million in 2019, it ranks as the nation's fourth most populous province. A portion of Siem Reap province's southern border is demarcated by the Tonle Sap and as such, it is one of the nine provinces that making up the Tonle Sap Biosphere Reserve. The province is known as the site of Angkor and the Angkor Wat temple ruins, a UNESCO World Heritage Site. It is also the home of Banteay Srei, Roluos (temples), the UNESCO tentative site of Beng Mealea, and the UNESCO tentative site of Phnom Kulen National Park, home to the country's largest reclining Buddha.

== Etymology ==
The name Siem Reap literally means 'defeat Siam' and emerged after the victory of Ang Chan I over the Siamese in 1530 at Angkor, a reminder of the centuries-old conflict between the Siamese and the Khmer. In Siam, the province and its capital were called Siemmarat (Thai: เสียมราฐ), literally meaning 'Siam's territory'.

== Subdivisions ==
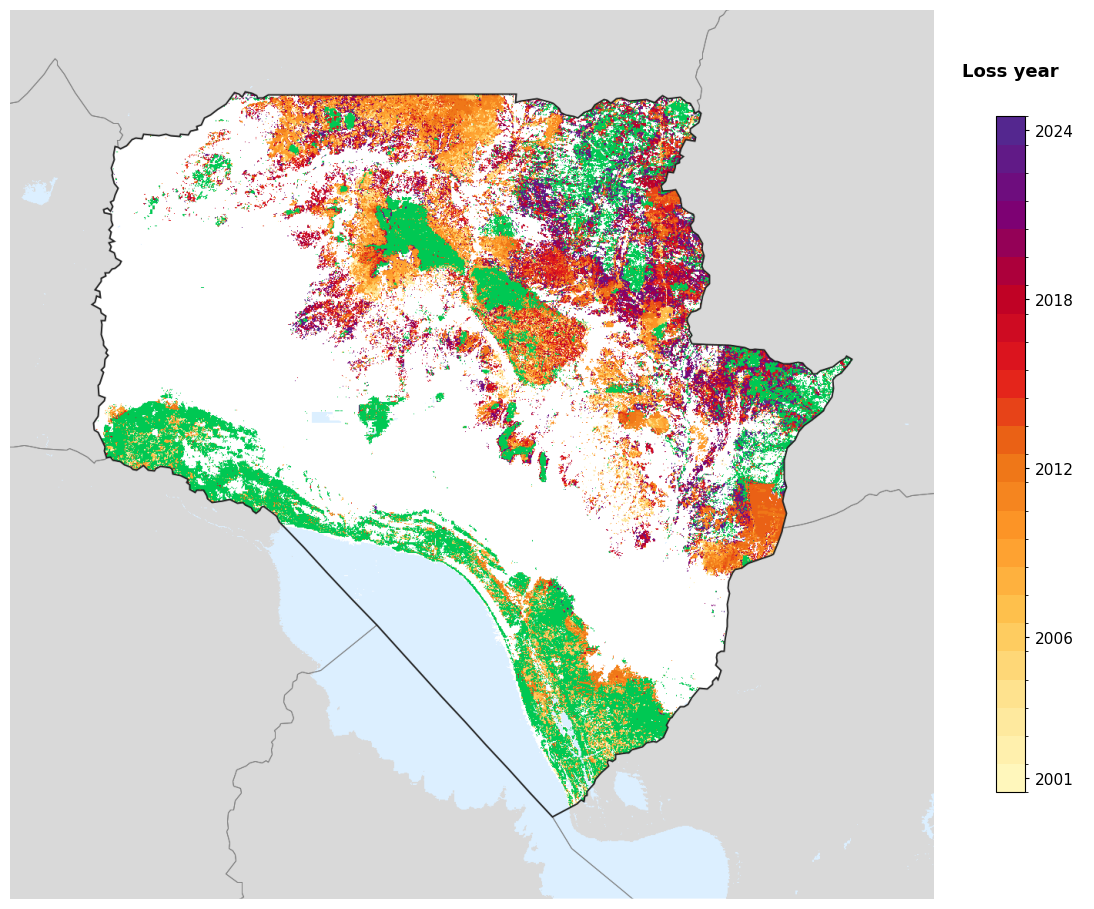
Tree-cover loss year in Siem Reap, 2001-2024, from the Global Forest Change dataset.

The province is divided into 2 municipalities and 11 districts, and further subdivided into 100 communes and 907 villages.

ISO code	Name	Khmer	Subdivisions
— Municipality —
17–10	Siem Reap	សៀមរាប	12 sangkat
	Run Ta Aek Techo Sen	រុនតាឯកតេជោសែន	2 sangkat
— District —
17–01	Angkor Chum	អង្គរជុំ	7 khum
17–02	Angkor Thom	អង្គរធំ	4 khum
17–03	Banteay Srei	បន្ទាយស្រី	5 khum
17–04	Chi Kraeng	ជីក្រែង	12 khum
17–06	Kralanh	ក្រឡាញ់	10 khum
17–07	Puok	ពួក	14 khum
17–09	Prasat Bakong	ប្រាសាទបាគង	8 khum
17–11	Soutr Nikom	សូត្រនិគម	10 khum
17–12	Srei Snam	ស្រីស្នំ	6 khum
17–13	Svay Leu	ស្វាយលើ	5 khum
17–14	Varin	វ៉ារិន	5 khum

== Gallery ==
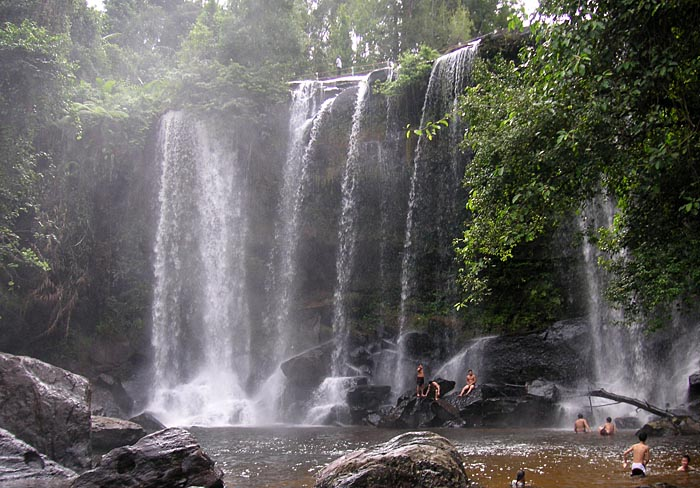
Phnom Kulen

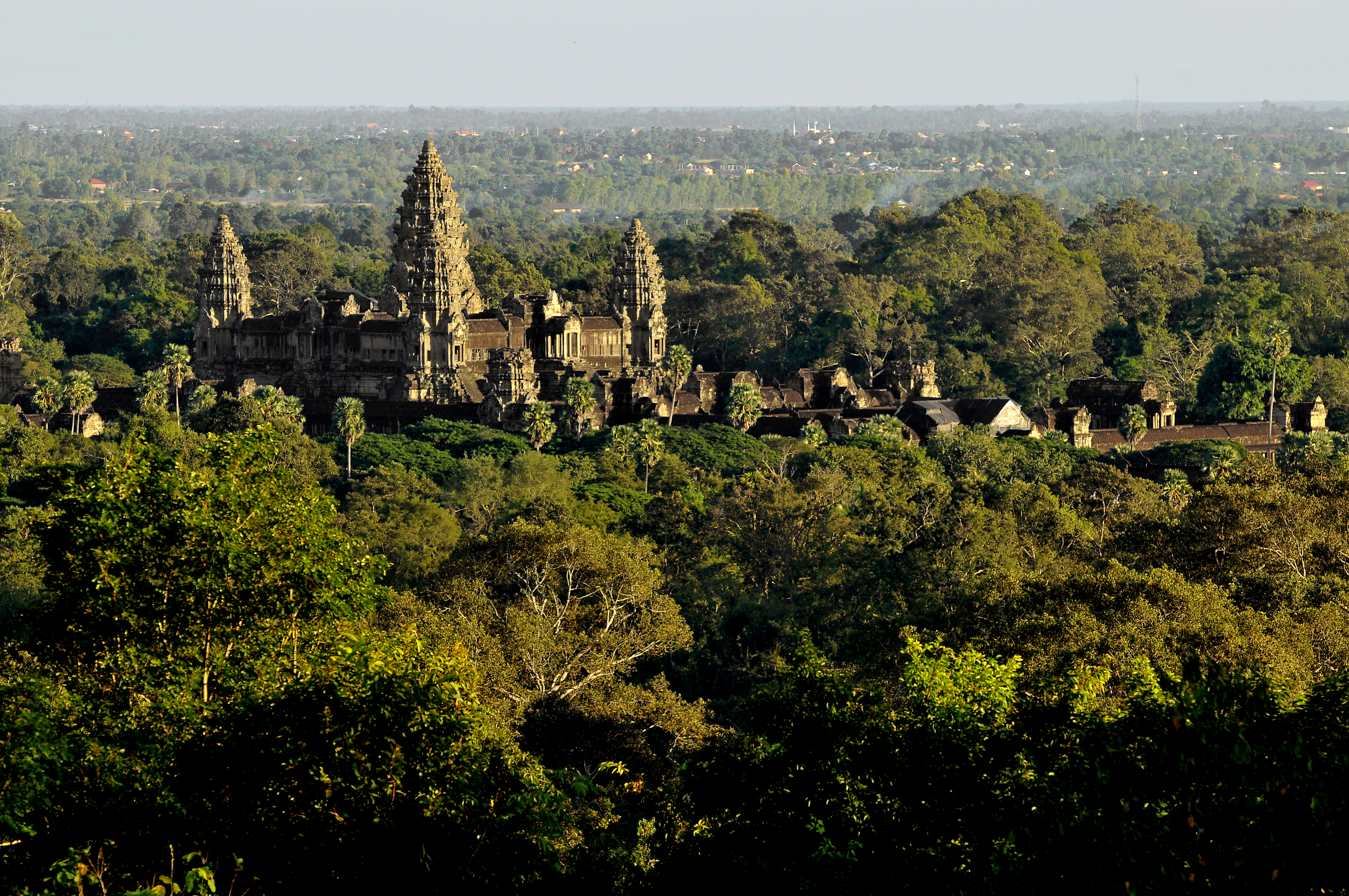
Angkor Wat view from Phnom Bakheng

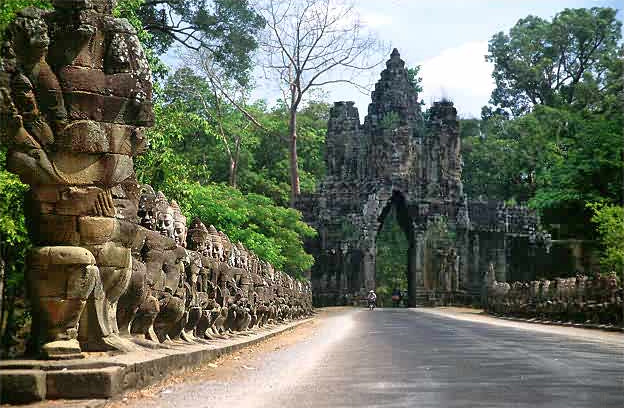
South gate of Angkor Thom

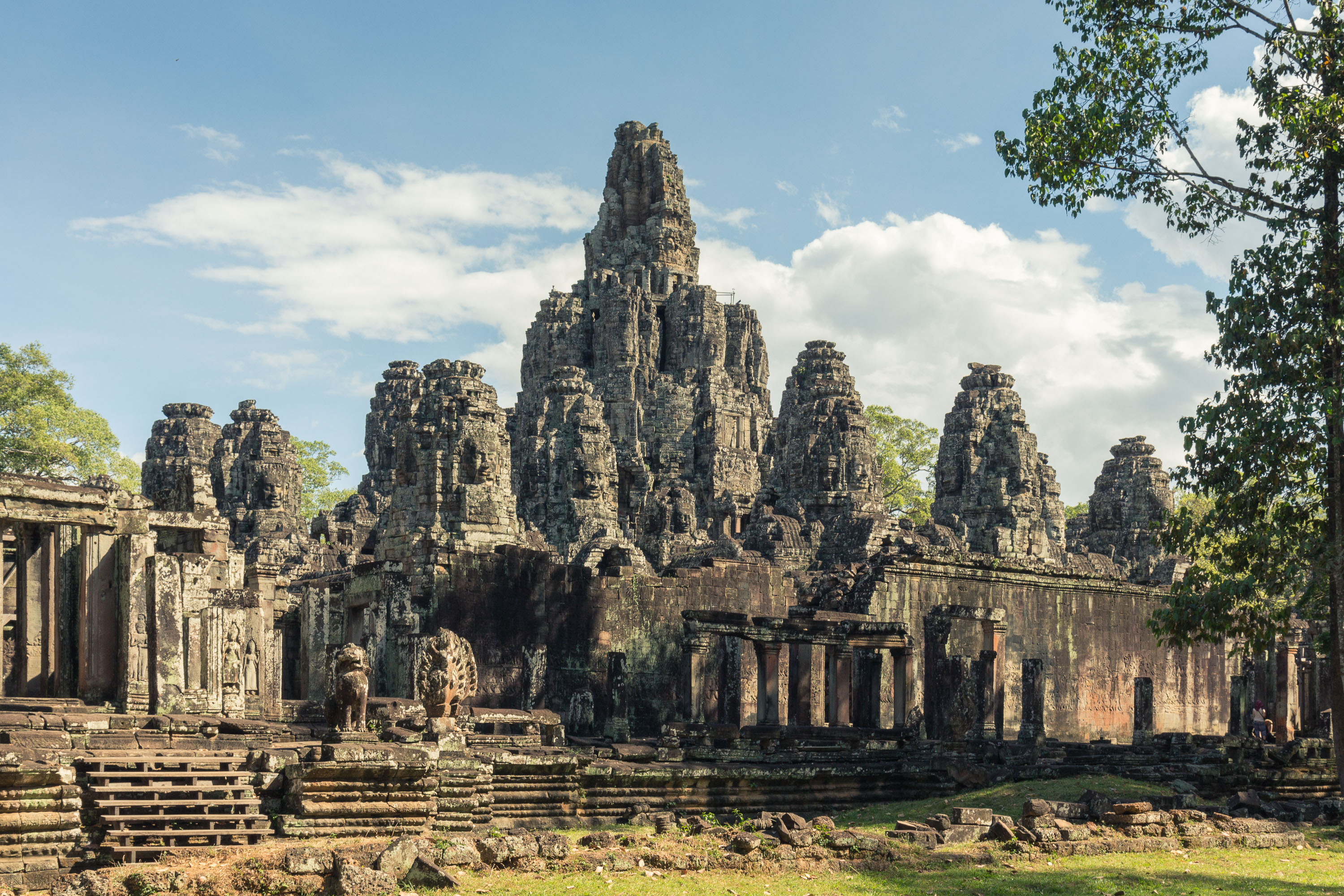
Bayon Temple

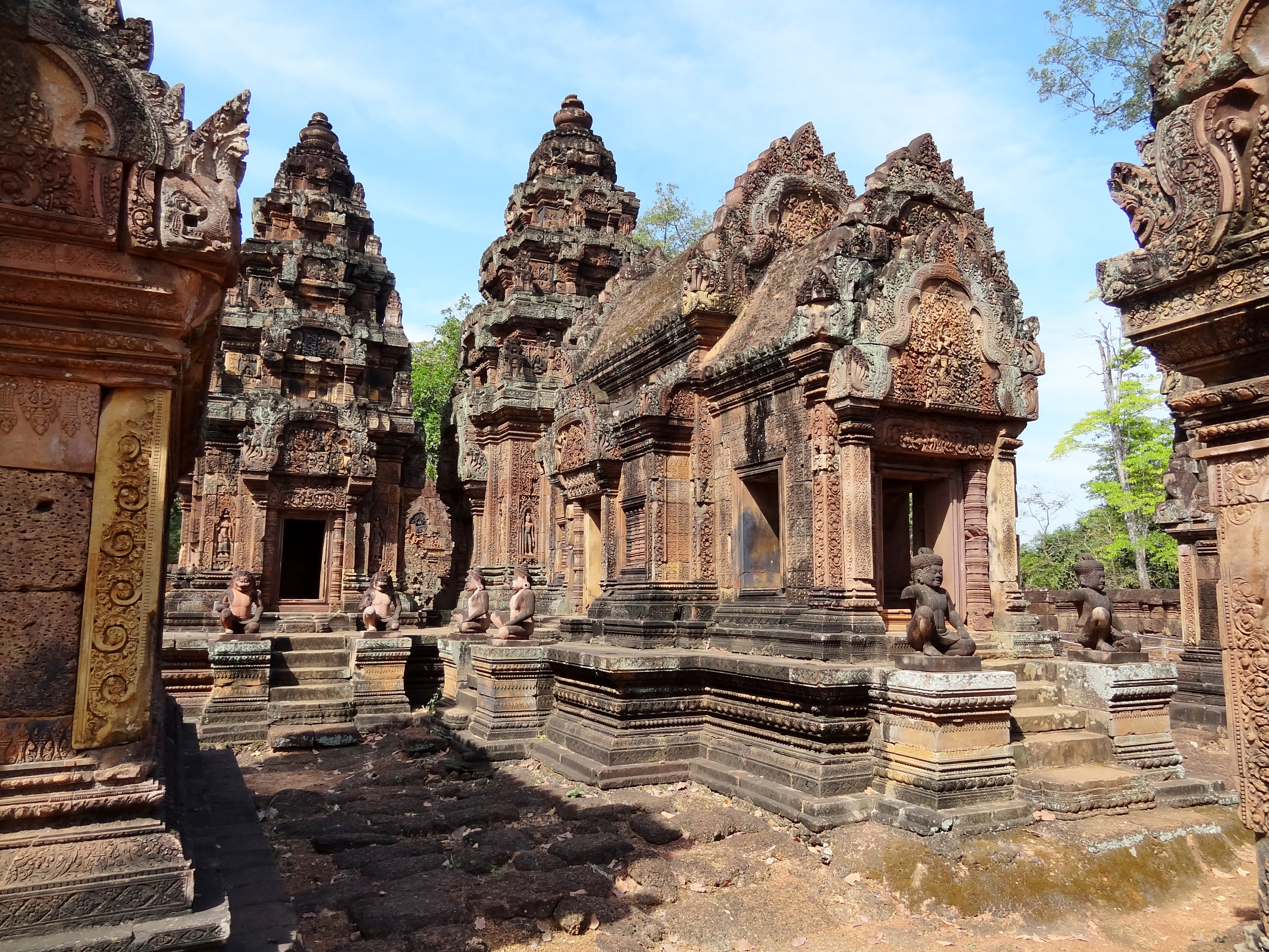
Banteay Srei

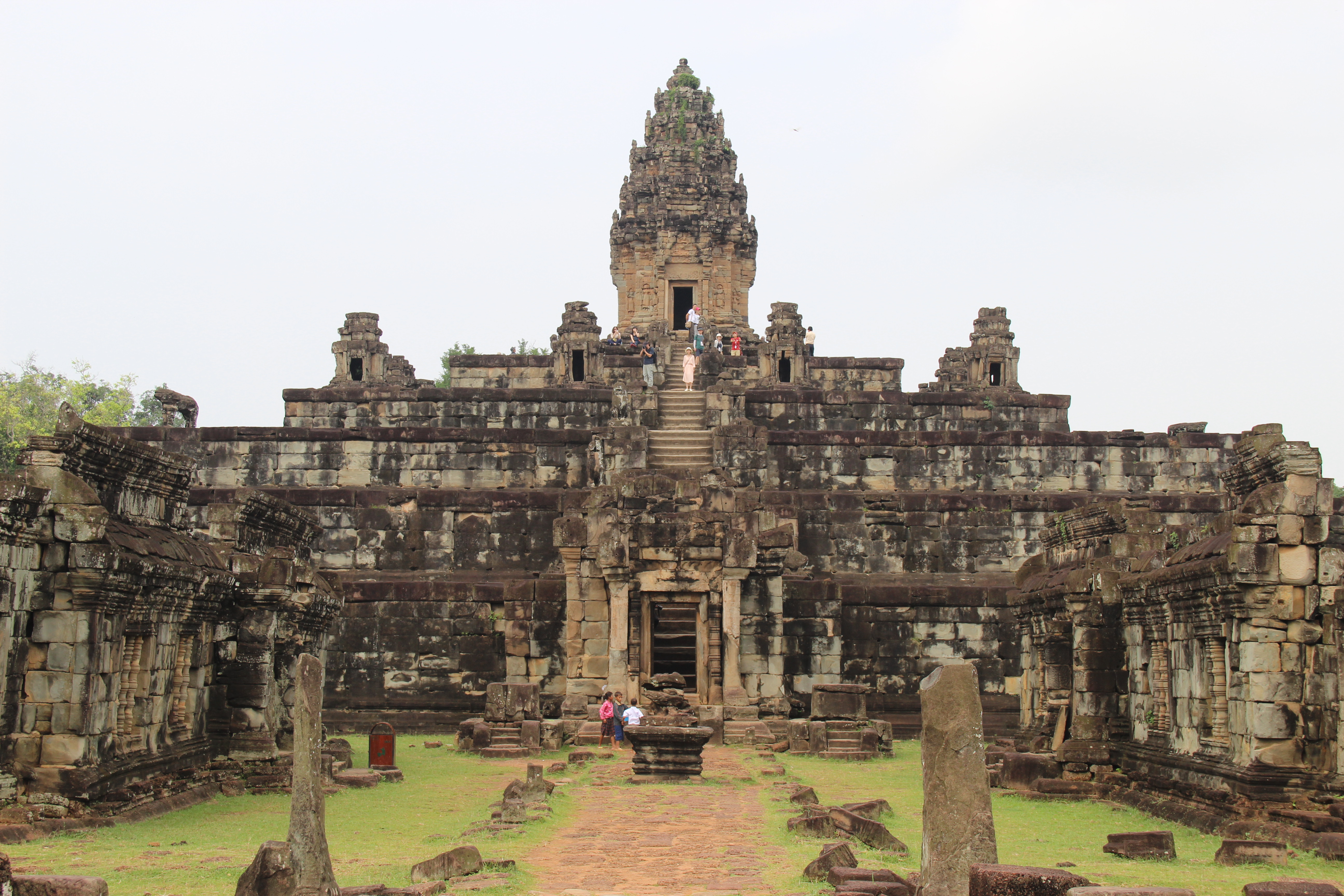
Prasat Bakong
