= List of communes in Cambodia =

Commune ឃុំ/សង្កាត់ (Khmer)
- Category: Third-level administrative subdivision of a unitary state
- Location: Cambodia
- Number: 1,652
- Subdivisions: Villages (4th-level) Blocks (5th-level)

The communes of Cambodia (ឃុំ khum/សង្កាត់ sangkat) are the third-level administrative divisions in Cambodia. They are the subdivisions of the districts and municipalities of Cambodia. Communes can consist of as few as 1 or as many as 33 villages (phum), depending on the population. There are a total of 1,652 communes and 14,578 villages in Cambodia.

== Banteay Meanchey Province ==
Banteay Meanchey contains 55 Communes (ឃុំ Khum), 12 Quarters (សង្កាត់ Sangkat) and 666 Villages (ភូមិ Phum).

=== Mongkol Borey District ===
Mongkol Borey contains 13 Communes (ឃុំ Khum) and 159 Villages (ភូមិ Phum).

#	Name	Khmer	UNGEGN	Administrative Unit	Geocode	# of Villages
1	Banteay Neang	បន្ទាយនាង	Bântéay Néang	Commune (ឃុំ Khum)	010201	19
2	Bat Trang	បត់ត្រង់	Bát Tráng	Commune (ឃុំ Khum)	010202	11
3	Chamnaom	ចំណោម	Châmnaôm	Commune (ឃុំ Khum)	010203	18
4	Kouk Ballangk	គោកបល្ល័ង្គ	Koŭk Bâlleăngk	Commune (ឃុំ Khum)	010204	8
5	Koy Maeng	គយម៉ែង	Kôy Mêng	Commune (ឃុំ Khum)	010205	8
6	Ou Prasat	អូរប្រាសាទ	Or Brasat	Commune (ឃុំ Khum)	010206	14
7	Phnum Touch	ភ្នំតូច	Phnum Toch	Commune (ឃុំ Khum)	010207	10
8	Rohat Tuek	រហាត់ទឹក	Rôhăt Tœ̆k	Commune (ឃុំ Khum)	010208	13
9	Ruessei Kraok	ឫស្សីក្រោក	Rœ̆ssei Kraôk	Commune (ឃុំ Khum)	010209	17
10	Sambuor	សំបួរ	Sâmbuŏr	Commune (ឃុំ Khum)	010210	11
11	Soea	សឿ	Sœă	Commune (ឃុំ Khum)	010211	13
12	Srah Reang	ស្រះរាំង	Srăh Reăng	Commune (ឃុំ Khum)	010212	9
13	Ta Lam	តាឡំ	Ta Lâm	Commune (ឃុំ Khum)	010213	8

=== Phnum Srok District ===
Phnum Srok contains 6 Communes (ឃុំ Khum) and 60 Villages (ភូមិ Phum).

#	Name	Khmer	UNGEGN	Administrative Unit	Geocode	# of Villages
1	Nam Tau	ណាំតៅ		Commune (ឃុំ Khum)	010301	18
2	Poy Char	ប៉ោយចារ		Commune (ឃុំ Khum)	010302	10
3	Ponley	ពន្លៃ		Commune (ឃុំ Khum)	010303	6
4	Spean Sraeng	ស្ពានស្រែង		Commune (ឃុំ Khum)	010304	6
5	Srah Chik	ស្រះជីក		Commune (ឃុំ Khum)	010305	9
6	Phnum Dei	ភ្នំដី		Commune (ឃុំ Khum)	010306	11

=== Preah Netr Preah District ===
Preah Netr Preah contains 9 Communes (ឃុំ Khum) and 118 Villages (ភូមិ Phum).

#	Name	Khmer	UNGEGN	Administrative Unit	Geocode	# of Villages
1	Chnuor Mean Chey	ឈ្នួរមានជ័យ		Commune (ឃុំ Khum)	010401	12
2	Chob Vari	ជប់វារី		Commune (ឃុំ Khum)	010402	11
3	Phnum Lieb	ភ្នំលៀប		Commune (ឃុំ Khum)	010403	16
4	Prasat	ប្រាសាទ		Commune (ឃុំ Khum)	010404	14
5	Preak Netr Preah	ព្រះនេត្រព្រះ		Commune (ឃុំ Khum)	010405	13
6	Rohal	រហាល		Commune (ឃុំ Khum)	010406	11
7	Tean Kam	ទានកាំ		Commune (ឃុំ Khum)	010407	6
8	Tuek Chour	ទឹកជោរ		Commune (ឃុំ Khum)	010408	18
9	Bos Sbov	បុស្បូវ		Commune (ឃុំ Khum)	010409	17

=== Ou Chrov District ===
Ou Chrov contains 7 Communes (ឃុំ Khum) and 56 Villages (ភូមិ Phum).

#	Name	Khmer	UNGEGN	Administrative Unit	Geocode	# of Villages
1	Changha	ចង្ហា		Commune (ឃុំ Khum)	010501	6
2	Koub	កូប		Commune (ឃុំ Khum)	010502	11
3	Kuttasat	គុត្ដសត		Commune (ឃុំ Khum)	010503	4
4	Samraong	សំរោង		Commune (ឃុំ Khum)	010505	10
5	Souphi	សូភី		Commune (ឃុំ Khum)	010506	5
6	Soengh	សឹង្ហ		Commune (ឃុំ Khum)	010507	9
7	Ou Beichoan	អូរបីជាន់		Commune (ឃុំ Khum)	010509	11

=== Serei Saophoan Municipality ===
Serei Saophoan contains 7 Quarters (សង្កាត់ Sangkat) and 46 Villages (ភូមិ Phum).

#	Name	Khmer	UNGEGN	Administrative Unit	Geocode	# of Villages
1	Kampong Svay	កំពង់ស្វាយ		Quarter (សង្កាត់ Sangkat)	010602	9
2	Kaoh Pong Satv	កោះពងសត្វ		Quarter (សង្កាត់ Sangkat)	010603	5
3	Mkak	ម្កាក់		Quarter (សង្កាត់ Sangkat)	010604	7
4	Ou Ambel	អូរអំបិល		Quarter (សង្កាត់ Sangkat)	010605	5
5	Phniet	ភ្នៀត		Quarter (សង្កាត់ Sangkat)	010606	7
6	Preah Ponlea	ព្រះពន្លា		Quarter (សង្កាត់ Sangkat)	010607	7
7	Tuek Thla	ទឹកថ្លា		Quarter (សង្កាត់ Sangkat)	010608	6

=== Thma Puok District ===
Thma Puok contains 6 Communes (ឃុំ Khum) and 67 Villages (ភូមិ Phum).

#	Name	Khmer	UNGEGN	Administrative Unit	Geocode	# of Villages
1	Banteay Chhmar	បន្ទាយឆ្មារ		Commune (ឃុំ Khum)	010701	16
2	Kouk Romiet	គោករមៀត		Commune (ឃុំ Khum)	010702	21
3	Phum Thmei	ភូមិថ្មី		Commune (ឃុំ Khum)	010703	7
4	Thma Puok	ថ្មពួក		Commune (ឃុំ Khum)	010704	7
5	Kouk Kakthen	គោកកឋិន		Commune (ឃុំ Khum)	010705	9
6	Kumru	គំរូ		Commune (ឃុំ Khum)	010706	7

=== Svay Chek District ===
Svay Chek contains 8 Communes (ឃុំ Khum) and 73 Villages (ភូមិ Phum).

#	Name	Khmer	UNGEGN	Administrative Unit	Geocode	# of Villages
1	Phkoam	ផ្គាំ		Commune (ឃុំ Khum)	010801	11
2	Sarongk	សារង្គ		Commune (ឃុំ Khum)	010802	6
3	Sla Kram	ស្លក្រាម		Commune (ឃុំ Khum)	010803	10
4	Svay Chek	ស្វាយចេក		Commune (ឃុំ Khum)	010804	14
5	Ta Baen	តាបែន		Commune (ឃុំ Khum)	010805	5
6	Ta Phou	តាផូ		Commune (ឃុំ Khum)	010806	11
7	Treas	ទ្រាស		Commune (ឃុំ Khum)	010807	9
8	Roluos	រលួស		Commune (ឃុំ Khum)	010808	7

=== Malai District ===
Malai contains 6 Communes (ឃុំ Khum) and 49 Villages (ភូមិ Phum).

#	Name	Khmer	UNGEGN	Administrative Unit	Geocode	# of Villages
1	Boeng Beng	បឹងបេង		Commune (ឃុំ Khum)	010901	7
2	Malai	ម៉ាឡៃ		Commune (ឃុំ Khum)	010902	8
3	Ou Sampoar	អូរសំព័រ		Commune (ឃុំ Khum)	010903	4
4	Ou Sralau	អូរស្រឡៅ		Commune (ឃុំ Khum)	010904	8
5	Tuol Pongro	ទួលពង្រ		Commune (ឃុំ Khum)	010905	16
6	Ta Kong	តាគង់		Commune (ឃុំ Khum)	010906	6

=== Poipet Municipality ===
Poipet contains 5 Quarters (សង្កាត់ Sangkat) and 38 Villages (ភូមិ Phum).

#	Name	Khmer	UNGEGN	Administrative Unit	Geocode	# of Villages
1	Nimitt	និមិត្ដ		Quarter (សង្កាត់ Sangkat)	011001	15
2	Poipet	ប៉ោយប៉ែត	Paôypêt	Quarter (សង្កាត់ Sangkat)	011002	6
3	Phsar Kandal	ផ្សារកណ្តាល		Quarter (សង្កាត់ Sangkat)	011003	5
4	Ou Chrov	អូរជ្រៅ		Quarter (សង្កាត់ Sangkat)	011004	7
5	Ou Reusey	អូរឫស្សី		Quarter (សង្កាត់ Sangkat)	011005	5

== Battambang Province ==
Battambang contains 93 Communes (ឃុំ Khum), 10 Quarters (សង្កាត់ Sangkat) and 844 Villages (ភូមិ Phum).

=== Banan District ===
Banan contains 8 Communes (ឃុំ Khum) and 77 Villages (ភូមិ Phum).

#	Name	Khmer	UNGEGN	Administrative Unit	Geocode	# of Villages
1	Kantueu Muoy	កន្ទឺ ១		Commune (ឃុំ Khum)	020101	7
2	Kantueu Pir	កន្ទឺ ២		Commune (ឃុំ Khum)	020102	7
3	Bay Damram	បាយដំរាំ		Commune (ឃុំ Khum)	020103	8
4	Chheu Teal	ឈើទាល		Commune (ឃុំ Khum)	020104	15
5	Chaeng Mean Chey	ចែងមានជ័យ		Commune (ឃុំ Khum)	020105	8
6	Phnum Sampov	ភ្នំសំពៅ		Commune (ឃុំ Khum)	020106	10
7	Snoeng	ស្នឹង		Commune (ឃុំ Khum)	020107	11
8	Ta Kream	តាគ្រាម		Commune (ឃុំ Khum)	020108	11

=== Thma Koul District ===
Thma Koul contains 10 Communes (ឃុំ Khum) and 71 Villages (ភូមិ Phum).

#	Name	Khmer	UNGEGN	Administrative Unit	Geocode	# of Villages
1	Ta Pung	តាពូង		Commune (ឃុំ Khum)	020201	7
2	Ta Meun	តាម៉ឺន		Commune (ឃុំ Khum)	020202	10
3	Ou Ta Ki	អូរតាគី		Commune (ឃុំ Khum)	020203	8
4	Chrey	ជ្រៃ		Commune (ឃុំ Khum)	020204	10
5	Anlong Run	អន្លង់រុន		Commune (ឃុំ Khum)	020205	5
6	Chrouy Sdau	ជ្រោយស្ដៅ		Commune (ឃុំ Khum)	020206	4
7	Boeng Pring	បឹងព្រីង		Commune (ឃុំ Khum)	020207	4
8	Kouk Khmum	គោកឃ្មុំ		Commune (ឃុំ Khum)	020208	8
9	Bansay Traeng	បន្សាយត្រែង		Commune (ឃុំ Khum)	020209	8
10	Rung Chrey	រូងជ្រៃ		Commune (ឃុំ Khum)	020210	7

=== Battambang Municipality ===
Battambang contains 10 Quarters (សង្កាត់ Sangkat) and 62 Villages (ភូមិ Phum).

#	Name	Khmer	UNGEGN	Administrative Unit	Geocode	# of Villages
1	Tuol Ta Ek	ទួលតាឯក		Quarter (សង្កាត់ Sangkat)	020301	5
2	Prek Preah Sdach	ព្រែកព្រះស្ដេច		Quarter (សង្កាត់ Sangkat)	020302	8
3	Rottanak	រតនៈ		Quarter (សង្កាត់ Sangkat)	020303	8
4	Chomkar Somraong	ចំការសំរោង		Quarter (សង្កាត់ Sangkat)	020304	5
5	Sla Ket	ស្លាកែត		Quarter (សង្កាត់ Sangkat)	020305	3
6	Kdol Doun Teav	ក្ដុលដូនទាវ		Quarter (សង្កាត់ Sangkat)	020306	7
7	Ou Mal	អូរម៉ាល់		Quarter (សង្កាត់ Sangkat)	020307	10
8	Wat Kor	វត្ដគរ		Quarter (សង្កាត់ Sangkat)	020308	6
9	Ou Char	អូរចារ		Quarter (សង្កាត់ Sangkat)	020309	6
10	Svay Por	ស្វាយប៉ោ		Quarter (សង្កាត់ Sangkat)	020310	4

=== Bavel District ===
Bavel contains 9 Communes (ឃុំ Khum) and 103 Villages (ភូមិ Phum).

#	Name	Khmer	UNGEGN	Administrative Unit	Geocode	# of Villages
1	Bavel	បវេល		Commune (ឃុំ Khum)	020401	12
2	Khnach Romeas	ខ្នាចរមាស		Commune (ឃុំ Khum)	020402	8
3	Lvea	ល្វា		Commune (ឃុំ Khum)	020403	12
4	Prey Khpos	ព្រៃខ្ពស់		Commune (ឃុំ Khum)	020404	10
5	Ampil Pram Daeum	អំពិលប្រាំដើម		Commune (ឃុំ Khum)	020405	15
6	Kdol Ta Haen	ក្ដុលតាហែន		Commune (ឃុំ Khum)	020406	15
7	Khlaeng Meas	ឃ្លាំងមាស		Commune (ឃុំ Khum)	020407	13
8	Boeung Pram	បឹងប្រាំ		Commune (ឃុំ Khum)	020408	9
9	Bouvel	បួវិល		Commune (ឃុំ Khum)	020409	9

=== Aek Phnum District ===
Aek Phnum contains 7 Communes (ឃុំ Khum) and 45 Villages (ភូមិ Phum).

#	Name	Khmer	UNGEGN	Administrative Unit	Geocode	# of Villages
1	Preaek Norint	ព្រែកនរិន្ទ		Commune (ឃុំ Khum)	020501	10
2	Samraong Knong	សំរោងក្នុង		Commune (ឃុំ Khum)	020502	5
3	Preaek Khpob	ព្រែកខ្ពប		Commune (ឃុំ Khum)	020503	5
4	Preaek Luong	ព្រែកហ្លួង		Commune (ឃុំ Khum)	020504	7
5	Peam Aek	ពាមឯក		Commune (ឃុំ Khum)	020505	8
6	Prey Chas	ព្រៃចាស់		Commune (ឃុំ Khum)	020506	5
7	Kaoh Chiveang	កោះជីវាំង		Commune (ឃុំ Khum)	020507	5

=== Moung Ruessei District ===
Moung Ruessei contains 9 Communes (ឃុំ Khum) and 93 Villages (ភូមិ Phum).

#	Name	Khmer	UNGEGN	Administrative Unit	Geocode	# of Villages
1	Moung	មោង		Commune (ឃុំ Khum)	020601	15
2	Kear	គារ		Commune (ឃុំ Khum)	020602	12
3	Prey Svay	ព្រៃស្វាយ		Commune (ឃុំ Khum)	020603	9
4	Ruessei Krang	ឫស្សីក្រាំង		Commune (ឃុំ Khum)	020604	11
5	Chrey	ជ្រៃ		Commune (ឃុំ Khum)	020605	8
6	Ta Loas	តាលាស់		Commune (ឃុំ Khum)	020606	10
7	Kakaoh	កកោះ		Commune (ឃុំ Khum)	020607	8
8	Prey Touch	ព្រៃតូច		Commune (ឃុំ Khum)	020608	8
9	Robas Mongkol	របស់មង្គល		Commune (ឃុំ Khum)	020609	12

=== Rotonak Mondol District ===
Rotonak Mondol contains 5 Communes (ឃុំ Khum) and 38 Villages (ភូមិ Phum).

#	Name	Khmer	UNGEGN	Administrative Unit	Geocode	# of Villages
1	Sdau	ស្ដៅ		Commune (ឃុំ Khum)	020701	8
2	Andaeuk Haeb	អណ្ដើកហែប		Commune (ឃុំ Khum)	020702	7
3	Phlov Meas	ផ្លូវមាស		Commune (ឃុំ Khum)	020703	7
4	Traeng	ត្រែង		Commune (ឃុំ Khum)	020704	8
5	Reaksmei Songha	រស្មីសង្ហារ		Commune (ឃុំ Khum)	020705	8

=== Sangkae District ===
Sangkae contains 10 Communes (ឃុំ Khum) and 64 Villages (ភូមិ Phum).

#	Name	Khmer	UNGEGN	Administrative Unit	Geocode	# of Villages
1	Anlong Vil	អន្លង់វិល		Commune (ឃុំ Khum)	020801	10
2	Norea	នរា		Commune (ឃុំ Khum)	020802	4
3	Ta Pon	តាប៉ុន		Commune (ឃុំ Khum)	020803	5
4	Roka	រកា		Commune (ឃុំ Khum)	020804	6
5	Kampong Preah	កំពង់ព្រះ		Commune (ឃុំ Khum)	020805	6
6	Kampong Prieng	កំពង់ព្រៀង		Commune (ឃុំ Khum)	020806	6
7	Reang Kesei	រាំងកេសី		Commune (ឃុំ Khum)	020807	9
8	Ou Dambang Muoy	អូរដំបង ១		Commune (ឃុំ Khum)	020808	6
9	Ou Dambang Pir	អូរដំបង ២		Commune (ឃុំ Khum)	020809	6
10	Vaot Ta Muem	វត្ដតាមិម		Commune (ឃុំ Khum)	020810	6

=== Samlout District ===
Samlout contains 7 Communes (ឃុំ Khum) and 59 Villages (ភូមិ Phum).

#	Name	Khmer	UNGEGN	Administrative Unit	Geocode	# of Villages
1	Ta Taok	តាតោក		Commune (ឃុំ Khum)	020901	9
2	Kampong Lpov	កំពង់ល្ពៅ		Commune (ឃុំ Khum)	020902	9
3	Ou Samril	អូរសំរិល		Commune (ឃុំ Khum)	020903	6
4	Sung	ស៊ុង		Commune (ឃុំ Khum)	020904	10
5	Samlout	សំឡូត		Commune (ឃុំ Khum)	020905	11
6	Mean Chey	មានជ័យ		Commune (ឃុំ Khum)	020906	7
7	Ta Sanh	តាសាញ		Commune (ឃុំ Khum)	020907	7

=== Sampov Lun District ===
Sampov Lun contains 6 Communes (ឃុំ Khum) and 42 Villages (ភូមិ Phum).

#	Name	Khmer	UNGEGN	Administrative Unit	Geocode	# of Villages
1	Sampov Lun	សំពៅលូន		Commune (ឃុំ Khum)	021001	4
2	Angkor Ban	អង្គរបាន		Commune (ឃុំ Khum)	021002	5
3	Ta Sda	តាស្ដា		Commune (ឃុំ Khum)	021003	6
4	Santepheap	សន្ដិភាព		Commune (ឃុំ Khum)	021004	7
5	Serei Mean Chey	សេរីមានជ័យ		Commune (ឃុំ Khum)	021005	12
6	Chrey Seima	ជ្រៃសីមា		Commune (ឃុំ Khum)	021006	8

=== Phnum Proek District ===
Phnum Proek contains 5 Communes (ឃុំ Khum) and 45 Villages (ភូមិ Phum).

#	Name	Khmer	UNGEGN	Administrative Unit	Geocode	# of Villages
1	Phnum Proek	ភ្នំព្រឹក		Commune (ឃុំ Khum)	021101	6
2	Pech Chenda	ពេជ្រចិន្ដា		Commune (ឃុំ Khum)	021102	9
3	Bour	បួរ		Commune (ឃុំ Khum)	021103	9
4	Barang Thleak	បារាំងធ្លាក់		Commune (ឃុំ Khum)	021104	13
5	Ou Rumduol	អូររំដួល		Commune (ឃុំ Khum)	021105	8

=== Kamrieng District ===
Kamrieng contains 6 Communes (ឃុំ Khum) and 49 Villages (ភូមិ Phum).

#	Name	Khmer	UNGEGN	Administrative Unit	Geocode	# of Villages
1	Kamrieng	កំរៀង		Commune (ឃុំ Khum)	021201	6
2	Boeng Reang	បឹងរាំង		Commune (ឃុំ Khum)	021202	8
3	Ou Da	អូរដា		Commune (ឃុំ Khum)	021203	10
4	Trang	ត្រាង		Commune (ឃុំ Khum)	021204	9
5	Ta Saen	តាសែន		Commune (ឃុំ Khum)	021205	6
6	Ta Krei	តាក្រី		Commune (ឃុំ Khum)	021206	10

=== Koas Krala District ===
Koas Krala contains 6 Communes (ឃុំ Khum) and 51 Villages (ភូមិ Phum).

#	Name	Khmer	UNGEGN	Administrative Unit	Geocode	# of Villages
1	Thipakdei	ធិបតី		Commune (ឃុំ Khum)	021301	11
2	Kaos Krala	គាស់ក្រឡ		Commune (ឃុំ Khum)	021302	9
3	Hab	ហប់		Commune (ឃុំ Khum)	021303	7
4	Preah Phos	ព្រះផុស		Commune (ឃុំ Khum)	021304	9
5	Doun Ba	ដូនបា		Commune (ឃុំ Khum)	021305	8
6	Chhnal Moan	ឆ្នាល់មាន់		Commune (ឃុំ Khum)	021306	7

=== Rukh Kiri District ===
Rukh Kiri contains 5 Communes (ឃុំ Khum) and 45 Villages (ភូមិ Phum).

#	Name	Khmer	UNGEGN	Administrative Unit	Geocode	# of Villages
1	Preaek Chik	ព្រែកជីក		Commune (ឃុំ Khum)	021401	11
2	Prey Tralach	ព្រៃត្រឡាច		Commune (ឃុំ Khum)	021402	8
3	Mukh Reah	មុខរាហ៍		Commune (ឃុំ Khum)	021403	7
4	Sdok Pravoek	ស្តុកប្រវឹក		Commune (ឃុំ Khum)	021404	10
5	Basak	បាសាក់		Commune (ឃុំ Khum)	021405	9

== Kampong Cham Province ==
Kampong Cham contains 105 Communes (ឃុំ Khum), 4 Quarters (សង្កាត់ Sangkat) and 947 Villages (ភូមិ Phum).

=== Batheay District ===
Batheay contains 12 Communes (ឃុំ Khum) and 89 Villages (ភូមិ Phum).

#	Name	Khmer	UNGEGN	Administrative Unit	Geocode	# of Villages
1	Batheay	បាធាយ		Commune (ឃុំ Khum)	030101	6
2	Chbar Ampov	ច្បារអំពៅ		Commune (ឃុំ Khum)	030102	4
3	Chealea	ជាលា		Commune (ឃុំ Khum)	030103	5
4	Cheung Prey	ជើងព្រៃ		Commune (ឃុំ Khum)	030104	7
5	Me Pring	មេព្រីង		Commune (ឃុំ Khum)	030105	5
6	Ph'av	ផ្អាវ		Commune (ឃុំ Khum)	030106	7
7	Sambour	សំបូរ		Commune (ឃុំ Khum)	030107	9
8	Sandaek	សណ្ដែក		Commune (ឃុំ Khum)	030108	9
9	Tang Krang	តាំងក្រាំង		Commune (ឃុំ Khum)	030109	8
10	Tang Krasang	តាំងក្រសាំង		Commune (ឃុំ Khum)	030110	11
11	Trab	ត្រប់		Commune (ឃុំ Khum)	030111	11
12	Tumnob	ទំនប់		Commune (ឃុំ Khum)	030112	7

=== Chamkar Leu District ===
Chamkar Leu contains 8 Communes (ឃុំ Khum) and 90 Villages (ភូមិ Phum).

#	Name	Khmer	UNGEGN	Administrative Unit	Geocode	# of Villages
1	Bos Khnor	បុសខ្នុរ		Commune (ឃុំ Khum)	030201	15
2	Chamkar Andoung	ចំការអណ្ដូង		Commune (ឃុំ Khum)	030202	13
3	Cheyyou	ជយោ		Commune (ឃុំ Khum)	030203	7
4	Lvea Leu	ល្វាលើ		Commune (ឃុំ Khum)	030204	7
5	Spueu	ស្ពឺ		Commune (ឃុំ Khum)	030205	8
6	Svay Teab	ស្វាយទាប		Commune (ឃុំ Khum)	030206	17
7	Ta Ong	តាអុង		Commune (ឃុំ Khum)	030207	12
8	Ta Prok	តាប្រុក		Commune (ឃុំ Khum)	030208	11

=== Cheung Prey District ===
Cheung Prey contains 10 Communes (ឃុំ Khum) and 74 Villages (ភូមិ Phum).

#	Name	Khmer	UNGEGN	Administrative Unit	Geocode	# of Villages
1	Khnor Dambang	ខ្នុរដំបង		Commune (ឃុំ Khum)	030301	3
2	Kouk Rovieng	គោករវៀង		Commune (ឃុំ Khum)	030302	4
3	Pdau Chum	ផ្ដៅជុំ		Commune (ឃុំ Khum)	030303	4
4	Prey Char	ព្រៃចារ		Commune (ឃុំ Khum)	030304	6
5	Pring Chrum	ព្រីងជ្រុំ		Commune (ឃុំ Khum)	030305	5
6	Sampong Chey	សំពងជ័យ		Commune (ឃុំ Khum)	030306	14
7	Sdaeung Chey	ស្ដើងជ័យ		Commune (ឃុំ Khum)	030307	7
8	Soutib	សូទិព្វ		Commune (ឃុំ Khum)	030308	8
9	Sramar	ស្រម៉រ		Commune (ឃុំ Khum)	030309	13
10	Trapeang Kor	ត្រពាំងគរ		Commune (ឃុំ Khum)	030310	10

=== Kampong Cham Municipality ===
Kampong Cham contains 4 Quarters (សង្កាត់ Sangkat) and 34 Villages (ភូមិ Phum).

#	Name	Khmer	UNGEGN	Administrative Unit	Geocode	# of Villages
1	Boeng Kok	បឹងកុក		Quarter (សង្កាត់ Sangkat)	030501	8
2	Kampong Cham	កំពង់ចាម	Kâmpóng Cham	Quarter (សង្កាត់ Sangkat)	030502	9
3	Sambuor Meas	សំបួរមាស		Quarter (សង្កាត់ Sangkat)	030503	10
4	Veal Vong	វាលវង់		Quarter (សង្កាត់ Sangkat)	030504	7

=== Kampong Siem District ===
Kampong Siem contains 15 Communes (ឃុំ Khum) and 114 Villages (ភូមិ Phum).

#	Name	Khmer	UNGEGN	Administrative Unit	Geocode	# of Villages
1	Ampil	អំពិល		Commune (ឃុំ Khum)	030601	14
2	Hanchey	ហាន់ជ័យ		Commune (ឃុំ Khum)	030602	4
3	Kien Chrey	កៀនជ្រៃ		Commune (ឃុំ Khum)	030603	6
4	Kokor	គគរ		Commune (ឃុំ Khum)	030604	4
5	Kaoh Mitt	កោះមិត្ដ		Commune (ឃុំ Khum)	030605	9
6	Kaoh Roka	កោះរកា		Commune (ឃុំ Khum)	030606	7
7	Kaoh Samraong	កោះសំរោង		Commune (ឃុំ Khum)	030607	8
8	Kaoh Tontuem	កោះទន្ទឹម		Commune (ឃុំ Khum)	030608	5
9	Krala	ក្រឡា		Commune (ឃុំ Khum)	030609	13
10	Ou Svay	អូរស្វាយ		Commune (ឃុំ Khum)	030610	7
11	Ro'ang	រអាង		Commune (ឃុំ Khum)	030611	8
12	Rumchek	រំចេក		Commune (ឃុំ Khum)	030612	4
13	Srak	ស្រក		Commune (ឃុំ Khum)	030613	4
14	Trean	ទ្រាន		Commune (ឃុំ Khum)	030614	12
15	Vihear Thum	វិហារធំ		Commune (ឃុំ Khum)	030615	9

=== Kang Meas District ===
Kang Meas contains 11 Communes (ឃុំ Khum) and 98 Villages (ភូមិ Phum).

#	Name	Khmer	UNGEGN	Administrative Unit	Geocode	# of Villages
1	Angkor Ban	អង្គរបាន		Commune (ឃុំ Khum)	030701	9
2	Kang Ta Noeng	កងតាណឹង		Commune (ឃុំ Khum)	030702	9
3	Khchau	ខ្ចៅ		Commune (ឃុំ Khum)	030703	10
4	Peam Chi Kang	ពាមជីកង		Commune (ឃុំ Khum)	030704	7
5	Preaek Koy	ព្រែកកុយ		Commune (ឃុំ Khum)	030705	7
6	Preaek Krabau	ព្រែកក្របៅ		Commune (ឃុំ Khum)	030706	10
7	Reay Pay	រាយប៉ាយ		Commune (ឃុំ Khum)	030707	11
8	Roka Ar	រកាអារ		Commune (ឃុំ Khum)	030708	9
9	Roka Koy	រកាគយ		Commune (ឃុំ Khum)	030709	7
10	Sdau	ស្ដៅ		Commune (ឃុំ Khum)	030710	6
11	Sour Kong	សូរគង		Commune (ឃុំ Khum)	030711	13

=== Kaoh Soutin District ===
Kaoh Soutin contains 8 Communes (ឃុំ Khum) and 86 Villages (ភូមិ Phum).

#	Name	Khmer	UNGEGN	Administrative Unit	Geocode	# of Villages
1	Kampong Reab	កំពង់រាប		Commune (ឃុំ Khum)	030801	8
2	Kaoh Sotin	កោះសូទិន		Commune (ឃុំ Khum)	030802	15
3	Lve	ល្វេ		Commune (ឃុំ Khum)	030803	10
4	Moha Leaph	មហាលាភ		Commune (ឃុំ Khum)	030804	10
5	Moha Khnhoung	មហាខ្ញូង		Commune (ឃុំ Khum)	030805	9
6	Peam Prathnuoh	ពាមប្រធ្នោះ		Commune (ឃុំ Khum)	030806	13
7	Pongro	ពង្រ		Commune (ឃុំ Khum)	030807	8
8	Preaek Ta Nong	ព្រែកតានង់		Commune (ឃុំ Khum)	030808	13

=== Prey Chhor District ===
Prey Chhor contains 15 Communes (ឃុំ Khum) and 176 Villages (ភូមិ Phum).

#	Name	Khmer	UNGEGN	Administrative Unit	Geocode	# of Villages
1	Baray	បារាយណ៍		Commune (ឃុំ Khum)	031301	13
2	Boeng Nay	បឹងណាយ		Commune (ឃុំ Khum)	031302	17
3	Chrey Vien	ជ្រៃវៀន		Commune (ឃុំ Khum)	031303	18
4	Khvet Thum	ខ្វិតធំ		Commune (ឃុំ Khum)	031304	8
5	Kor	គរ		Commune (ឃុំ Khum)	031305	10
6	Krouch	ក្រូច		Commune (ឃុំ Khum)	031306	7
7	Lvea	ល្វា		Commune (ឃុំ Khum)	031307	10
8	Mien	មៀន		Commune (ឃុំ Khum)	031308	19
9	Prey Chhor	ព្រៃឈរ		Commune (ឃុំ Khum)	031309	4
10	Sour Saen	សូរសែន្យ		Commune (ឃុំ Khum)	031310	8
11	Samraong	សំរោង		Commune (ឃុំ Khum)	031311	11
12	Sragnae	ស្រង៉ែ		Commune (ឃុំ Khum)	031312	8
13	Thma Pun	ថ្មពូន		Commune (ឃុំ Khum)	031313	9
14	Tong Rong	តុងរ៉ុង		Commune (ឃុំ Khum)	031314	10
15	Trapeang Preah	ត្រពាំងព្រះ		Commune (ឃុំ Khum)	031315	24

=== Srei Santhor District ===
Srei Santhor contains 14 Communes (ឃុំ Khum) and 86 Villages (ភូមិ Phum).

#	Name	Khmer	UNGEGN	Administrative Unit	Geocode	# of Villages
1	Baray	បារាយណ៍		Commune (ឃុំ Khum)	031401	4
2	Chi Bal	ជីបាល		Commune (ឃុំ Khum)	031402	5
3	Khnar Sa	ខ្នារស		Commune (ឃុំ Khum)	031403	5
4	Kaoh Andaet	កោះអណ្ដែត		Commune (ឃុំ Khum)	031404	4
5	Mean Chey	មានជ័យ		Commune (ឃុំ Khum)	031405	7
6	Phteah Kandal	ផ្ទះកណ្ដាល		Commune (ឃុំ Khum)	031406	4
7	Pram Yam	ប្រាំយ៉ាម		Commune (ឃុំ Khum)	031407	4
8	Preaek Dambouk	ព្រែកដំបូក		Commune (ឃុំ Khum)	031408	9
9	Preaek Pou	ព្រែកពោធិ		Commune (ឃុំ Khum)	031409	12
10	Preaek Rumdeng	ព្រែករំដេង		Commune (ឃុំ Khum)	031410	14
11	Ruessei Srok	ឫស្សីស្រុក		Commune (ឃុំ Khum)	031411	4
12	Svay Pou	ស្វាយពោធិ		Commune (ឃុំ Khum)	031412	6
13	Svay Khsach Phnum	ស្វាយខ្សាច់ភ្នំ		Commune (ឃុំ Khum)	031413	4
14	Tong Tralach	ទងត្រឡាច		Commune (ឃុំ Khum)	031414	4

=== Stueng Trang District ===
Stueng Trang contains 12 Communes (ឃុំ Khum) and 100 Villages (ភូមិ Phum).

#	Name	Khmer	UNGEGN	Administrative Unit	Geocode	# of Villages
1	Areaks Tnot	អារក្សត្នោត		Commune (ឃុំ Khum)	031501	7
2	Dang Kdar	ដងក្ដារ		Commune (ឃុំ Khum)	031503	10
3	Khpob Ta Nguon	ខ្ពបតាងួន		Commune (ឃុំ Khum)	031504	6
4	Me Sar Chrey	មេសរជ្រៃ		Commune (ឃុំ Khum)	031505	5
5	Ou Mlu	អូរម្លូ		Commune (ឃុំ Khum)	031506	13
6	Peam Kaoh Snar	ពាមកោះស្នា		Commune (ឃុំ Khum)	031507	9
7	Preah Andoung	ព្រះអណ្ដូង		Commune (ឃុំ Khum)	031508	3
8	Preaek Bak	ព្រែកបាក់		Commune (ឃុំ Khum)	031509	5
9	Preak Kak	ព្រែកកក់		Commune (ឃុំ Khum)	031510	24
10	Soupheas	សូភាស		Commune (ឃុំ Khum)	031512	7
11	Tuol Preah Khleang	ទួលព្រះឃ្លាំង		Commune (ឃុំ Khum)	031513	7
12	Tuol Sambuor	ទួលសំបួរ		Commune (ឃុំ Khum)	031514	4

== Kampong Chhnang Province ==
Kampong Chhnang contains 67 Communes (ឃុំ Khum), 4 Quarters (សង្កាត់ Sangkat) and 569 Villages (ភូមិ Phum).

=== Baribour District ===
Baribour contains 11 Communes (ឃុំ Khum) and 64 Villages (ភូមិ Phum).

#	Name	Khmer	UNGEGN	Administrative Unit	Geocode	# of Villages
1	Anhchanh Rung	អញ្ចាញរូង		Commune (ឃុំ Khum)	040101	6
2	Chhnok Tru	ឆ្នុកទ្រូ		Commune (ឃុំ Khum)	040102	3
3	Chak	ចក		Commune (ឃុំ Khum)	040103	5
4	Khon Rang	ខុនរ៉ង		Commune (ឃុំ Khum)	040104	10
5	Kampong Preah Kokir	កំពង់ព្រះគគីរ		Commune (ឃុំ Khum)	040105	4
6	Melum	មេលំ		Commune (ឃុំ Khum)	040106	5
7	Phsar	ផ្សារ		Commune (ឃុំ Khum)	040107	7
8	Pech Changvar	ពេជចង្វារ		Commune (ឃុំ Khum)	040108	6
9	Popel	ពពេល		Commune (ឃុំ Khum)	040109	8
10	Ponley	ពន្លៃ		Commune (ឃុំ Khum)	040110	6
11	Trapeang Chan	ត្រពាំងចាន់		Commune (ឃុំ Khum)	040111	4

=== Chol Kiri District ===
Chol Kiri contains 5 Communes (ឃុំ Khum) and 29 Villages (ភូមិ Phum).

#	Name	Khmer	UNGEGN	Administrative Unit	Geocode	# of Villages
1	Chol Sar	ជលសា		Commune (ឃុំ Khum)	040201	6
2	Kaoh Thkov	កោះថ្កូវ		Commune (ឃុំ Khum)	040202	10
3	Kampong Ous	កំពង់អុស		Commune (ឃុំ Khum)	040203	4
4	Peam Chhkaok	ពាមឆ្កោក		Commune (ឃុំ Khum)	040204	4
5	Prey Kri	ព្រៃគ្រី		Commune (ឃុំ Khum)	040205	5

=== Kampong Chhnang Municipality ===
Kampong Chhnang contains 4 Quarters (សង្កាត់ Sangkat) and 26 Villages (ភូមិ Phum).

#	Name	Khmer	UNGEGN	Administrative Unit	Geocode	# of Villages
1	Phsar Chhnang	ផ្សារឆ្នាំង		Quarter (សង្កាត់ Sangkat)	040301	8
2	Kampong Chhnang	កំពង់ឆ្នាំង		Quarter (សង្កាត់ Sangkat)	040302	6
3	B'er	ប្អេរ		Quarter (សង្កាត់ Sangkat)	040303	4
4	Khsam	ខ្សាម		Quarter (សង្កាត់ Sangkat)	040304	8

=== Kampong Leaeng District ===
Kampong Leaeng contains 9 Communes (ឃុំ Khum) and 44 Villages (ភូមិ Phum).

#	Name	Khmer	UNGEGN	Administrative Unit	Geocode	# of Villages
1	Chranouk	ច្រណូក		Commune (ឃុំ Khum)	040401	4
2	Dar	ដារ		Commune (ឃុំ Khum)	040402	5
3	Kampong Hau	កំពង់ហៅ		Commune (ឃុំ Khum)	040403	6
4	Phlov Tuk	ផ្លូវទូក		Commune (ឃុំ Khum)	040404	3
5	Pou	ពោធិ៍		Commune (ឃុំ Khum)	040405	6
6	Pralay Meas	ប្រឡាយមាស		Commune (ឃុំ Khum)	040406	6
7	Samraong Saen	សំរោងសែន		Commune (ឃុំ Khum)	040407	2
8	Svay Rumpear	ស្វាយរំពារ		Commune (ឃុំ Khum)	040408	5
9	Trangel	ត្រងិល		Commune (ឃុំ Khum)	040409	7

=== Kampong Tralach District ===
Kampong Tralach contains 10 Communes (ឃុំ Khum) and 103 Villages (ភូមិ Phum).

#	Name	Khmer	UNGEGN	Administrative Unit	Geocode	# of Villages
1	Ampil Tuek	អំពិលទឹក		Commune (ឃុំ Khum)	040501	11
2	Chhuk Sa	ឈូកស		Commune (ឃុំ Khum)	040502	14
3	Chres	ច្រេស		Commune (ឃុំ Khum)	040503	14
4	Kampong Tralach	កំពង់ត្រឡាច		Commune (ឃុំ Khum)	040504	7
5	Longveaek	លង្វែក		Commune (ឃុំ Khum)	040505	8
6	Ou Ruessei	អូរឫស្សី		Commune (ឃុំ Khum)	040506	8
7	Peani	ពានី		Commune (ឃុំ Khum)	040507	9
8	Saeb	សែប		Commune (ឃុំ Khum)	040508	12
9	Ta Ches	តាជេស		Commune (ឃុំ Khum)	040509	15
10	Thma Edth	ថ្មឥដ្ឋ		Commune (ឃុំ Khum)	040510	5

=== Rolea B'ier District ===
Rolea B'ier contains 14 Communes (ឃុំ Khum) and 135 Villages (ភូមិ Phum).

#	Name	Khmer	UNGEGN	Administrative Unit	Geocode	# of Villages
1	Andoung Snay	អណ្ដូងស្នាយ		Commune (ឃុំ Khum)	040601	7
2	Banteay Preal	បន្ទាយព្រាល		Commune (ឃុំ Khum)	040602	10
3	Cheung Kreav	ជើងគ្រាវ		Commune (ឃុំ Khum)	040603	11
4	Chrey Bak	ជ្រៃបាក់		Commune (ឃុំ Khum)	040604	16
5	Kouk Banteay	គោកបន្ទាយ		Commune (ឃុំ Khum)	040605	8
6	Krang Leav	ក្រាំងលាវ		Commune (ឃុំ Khum)	040606	8
7	Pongro	ពង្រ		Commune (ឃុំ Khum)	040607	12
8	Prasnoeb	ប្រស្នឹប		Commune (ឃុំ Khum)	040608	7
9	Prey Mul	ព្រៃមូល		Commune (ឃុំ Khum)	040609	7
10	Rolea B'ier	រលាប្អៀរ		Commune (ឃុំ Khum)	040610	6
11	Srae Thmei	ស្រែថ្មី		Commune (ឃុំ Khum)	040611	12
12	Svay Chrum	ស្វាយជ្រុំ		Commune (ឃុំ Khum)	040612	14
13	Tuek Hout	ទឹកហូត		Commune (ឃុំ Khum)	040613	9
14	Phnom Kraing Dey Meas	ភ្នំក្រាំងដីមាស		Commune (ឃុំ Khum)	040614	8

=== Sameakki Mean Chey District ===
Sameakki Mean Chey contains 9 Communes (ឃុំ Khum) and 90 Villages (ភូមិ Phum).

#	Name	Khmer	UNGEGN	Administrative Unit	Geocode	# of Villages
1	Chhean Laeung	ឈានឡើង		Commune (ឃុំ Khum)	040701	9
2	Khnar Chhmar	ខ្នារឆ្មារ		Commune (ឃុំ Khum)	040702	7
3	Krang Lvea	ក្រាំងល្វា		Commune (ឃុំ Khum)	040703	12
4	Peam	ពាម		Commune (ឃុំ Khum)	040704	13
5	Sedthei	សេដ្ឋី		Commune (ឃុំ Khum)	040705	9
6	Svay	ស្វាយ		Commune (ឃុំ Khum)	040706	13
7	Svay Chuk	ស្វាយជុក		Commune (ឃុំ Khum)	040707	11
8	Tbaeng Khpos	ត្បែងខ្ពស់		Commune (ឃុំ Khum)	040708	9
9	Thlok Vien	ធ្លកវៀន		Commune (ឃុំ Khum)	040709	7

=== Tuek Phos District ===
Tuek Phos contains 9 Communes (ឃុំ Khum) and 78 Villages (ភូមិ Phum).

#	Name	Khmer	UNGEGN	Administrative Unit	Geocode	# of Villages
1	Akphivoadth	អភិវឌ្ឍន៍		Commune (ឃុំ Khum)	040801	10
2	Chieb	ជៀប		Commune (ឃុំ Khum)	040802	11
3	Chaong Maong	ចោងម៉ោង		Commune (ឃុំ Khum)	040803	8
4	Kbal Tuek	ក្បាលទឹក		Commune (ឃុំ Khum)	040804	10
5	Khlong Popok	ខ្លុងពពក		Commune (ឃុំ Khum)	040805	7
6	Krang Skear	ក្រាំងស្គារ		Commune (ឃុំ Khum)	040806	7
7	Tang Krasang	តាំងក្រសាំង		Commune (ឃុំ Khum)	040807	12
8	Tuol Khpos	ទួលខ្ពស់		Commune (ឃុំ Khum)	040808	7
9	Kdol Saen Chey	ក្តុលសែនជ័យ		Commune (ឃុំ Khum)	040809	6

== Kampong Speu Province ==
Kampong Speu contains 78 Communes (ឃុំ Khum), 10 Quarters (សង្កាត់ Sangkat) and 1,365 Villages (ភូមិ Phum).

=== Basedth District ===
Basedth contains 15 Communes (ឃុំ Khum) and 218 Villages (ភូមិ Phum).

#	Name	Khmer	UNGEGN	Administrative Unit	Geocode	# of Villages
1	Basedth	បរសេដ្ឋ		Commune (ឃុំ Khum)	050101	22
2	Kat Phluk	កាត់ភ្លុក		Commune (ឃុំ Khum)	050102	11
3	Nitean	និទាន		Commune (ឃុំ Khum)	050103	15
4	Pheakdei	ភក្ដី		Commune (ឃុំ Khum)	050104	9
5	Pheari Mean Chey	ភារីមានជ័យ		Commune (ឃុំ Khum)	050105	13
6	Phong	ផុង		Commune (ឃុំ Khum)	050106	13
7	Pou Angkrang	ពោធិអង្ក្រង		Commune (ឃុំ Khum)	050107	19
8	Pou Chamraeun	ពោធិ៍ចំរើន		Commune (ឃុំ Khum)	050108	14
9	Pou Mreal	ពោធិ៍ម្រាល		Commune (ឃុំ Khum)	050109	18
10	Svay Chacheb	ស្វាយចចិប		Commune (ឃុំ Khum)	050110	15
11	Tuol Ampil	ទួលអំពិល		Commune (ឃុំ Khum)	050111	15
12	Tuol Sala	ទួលសាលា		Commune (ឃុំ Khum)	050112	17
13	Kak	កក់		Commune (ឃុំ Khum)	050113	14
14	Svay Rumpear	ស្វាយរំពារ		Commune (ឃុំ Khum)	050114	14
15	Preah Khae	ព្រះខែ		Commune (ឃុំ Khum)	050115	9

=== Chbar Mon Municipality ===
Chbar Mon contains 5 Quarters (សង្កាត់ Sangkat) and 56 Villages (ភូមិ Phum).

#	Name	Khmer	UNGEGN	Administrative Unit	Geocode	# of Villages
1	Chbar Mon	ច្បារមន		Quarter (សង្កាត់ Sangkat)	050201	13
2	Kandaol Dom	កណ្ដោលដុំ		Quarter (សង្កាត់ Sangkat)	050202	10
3	Rokar Thum	រការធំ		Quarter (សង្កាត់ Sangkat)	050203	12
4	Sopoar Tep	សុព័រទេព		Quarter (សង្កាត់ Sangkat)	050204	10
5	Svay Kravan	ស្វាយក្រវ៉ាន់		Quarter (សង្កាត់ Sangkat)	050205	11

=== Kong Pisei District ===
Kong Pisei contains 13 Communes (ឃុំ Khum) and 250 Villages (ភូមិ Phum).

#	Name	Khmer	UNGEGN	Administrative Unit	Geocode	# of Villages
1	Angk Popel	អង្គពពេល		Commune (ឃុំ Khum)	050301	13
2	Chongruk	ជង្រុក		Commune (ឃុំ Khum)	050302	25
3	Moha Ruessei	មហាឫស្សី		Commune (ឃុំ Khum)	050303	22
4	Pechr Muni	ពេជ្រមុនី		Commune (ឃុំ Khum)	050304	13
5	Preah Nipean	ព្រះនិព្វាន		Commune (ឃុំ Khum)	050305	27
6	Prey Nheat	ព្រៃញាតិ		Commune (ឃុំ Khum)	050306	25
7	Prey Vihear	ព្រៃវិហារ		Commune (ឃុំ Khum)	050307	19
8	Roka Kaoh	រកាកោះ		Commune (ឃុំ Khum)	050308	12
9	Sdok	ស្ដុក		Commune (ឃុំ Khum)	050309	18
10	Snam Krapeu	ស្នំក្រពើ		Commune (ឃុំ Khum)	050310	24
11	Srang	ស្រង់		Commune (ឃុំ Khum)	050311	18
12	Tuek L'ak	ទឹកល្អក់		Commune (ឃុំ Khum)	050312	12
13	Veal	វាល		Commune (ឃុំ Khum)	050313	22

=== Aural District ===
Aural contains 5 Communes (ឃុំ Khum) and 67 Villages (ភូមិ Phum).

#	Name	Khmer	UNGEGN	Administrative Unit	Geocode	# of Villages
1	Haong Samnam	ហោងសំណំ		Commune (ឃុំ Khum)	050401	9
2	Reaksmei Sameakki	រស្មីសាមគ្គី		Commune (ឃុំ Khum)	050402	8
3	Trapeang Chour	ត្រពាំងជោ		Commune (ឃុំ Khum)	050403	18
4	Sangkae Satob	សង្កែសាទប		Commune (ឃុំ Khum)	050404	15
5	Ta Sal	តាសាល		Commune (ឃុំ Khum)	050405	17

=== Phnum Sruoch District ===
Phnum Sruoch contains 13 Communes (ឃុំ Khum) and 149 Villages (ភូមិ Phum).

#	Name	Khmer	UNGEGN	Administrative Unit	Geocode	# of Villages
1	Chambak	ចំបក់		Commune (ឃុំ Khum)	050601	4
2	Choam Sangkae	ជាំសង្កែ		Commune (ឃុំ Khum)	050602	9
3	Dambouk Rung	ដំបូករូង		Commune (ឃុំ Khum)	050603	8
4	Kiri Voan	គិរីវន្ដ		Commune (ឃុំ Khum)	050604	9
5	Krang Dei Vay	ក្រាំងដីវ៉ាយ		Commune (ឃុំ Khum)	050605	9
6	Moha Sang	មហាសាំង		Commune (ឃុំ Khum)	050606	26
7	Ou	អូរ		Commune (ឃុំ Khum)	050607	22
8	Prey Rumduol	ព្រៃរំដួល		Commune (ឃុំ Khum)	050608	7
9	Prey Kmeng	ព្រៃក្មេង		Commune (ឃុំ Khum)	050609	8
10	Tang Samraong	តាំងសំរោង		Commune (ឃុំ Khum)	050610	10
11	Tang Sya	តាំងស្យា		Commune (ឃុំ Khum)	050611	17
12	Traeng Trayueng	ត្រែងត្រយឹង		Commune (ឃុំ Khum)	050613	11
13	Yeay Mao Pichnil	យាយម៉ៅពេជ្យនិល		Commune (ឃុំ Khum)	050614	9

=== Samraong Tong District ===
Samraong Tong contains 15 Communes (ឃុំ Khum) and 290 Villages (ភូមិ Phum).

#	Name	Khmer	UNGEGN	Administrative Unit	Geocode	# of Villages
1	Roleang Chak	រលាំងចក		Commune (ឃុំ Khum)	050701	19
2	Kahaeng	កាហែង		Commune (ឃុំ Khum)	050702	15
3	Khtum Krang	ខ្ទុំក្រាំង		Commune (ឃុំ Khum)	050703	14
4	Krang Ampil	ក្រាំងអំពិល		Commune (ឃុំ Khum)	050704	15
5	Pneay	ព្នាយ		Commune (ឃុំ Khum)	050705	19
6	Roleang Kreul	រលាំងគ្រើល		Commune (ឃុំ Khum)	050706	26
7	Samrong Tong	សំរោងទង		Commune (ឃុំ Khum)	050707	18
8	Sambour	សំបូរ		Commune (ឃុំ Khum)	050708	18
9	Saen Dei	សែនដី		Commune (ឃុំ Khum)	050709	21
10	Skuh	ស្គុះ		Commune (ឃុំ Khum)	050710	21
11	Tang Krouch	តាំងក្រូច		Commune (ឃុំ Khum)	050711	18
12	Thummoda Ar	ធម្មតាអរ		Commune (ឃុំ Khum)	050712	21
13	Trapeang Kong	ត្រពាំងគង		Commune (ឃុំ Khum)	050713	29
14	Tumpoar Meas	ទំព័រមាស		Commune (ឃុំ Khum)	050714	13
15	Voa Sar	វល្លិសរ		Commune (ឃុំ Khum)	050715	23

=== Thpong District ===
Thpong contains 7 Communes (ឃុំ Khum) and 84 Villages (ភូមិ Phum).

#	Name	Khmer	UNGEGN	Administrative Unit	Geocode	# of Villages
1	Amleang	អមលាំង		Commune (ឃុំ Khum)	050801	17
2	Monourom	មនោរម្យ		Commune (ឃុំ Khum)	050802	10
3	Prambei Mum	ប្រាំបីមុម		Commune (ឃុំ Khum)	050804	13
4	Rung Roeang	រុងរឿង		Commune (ឃុំ Khum)	050805	10
5	Toap Mean	ទ័ពមាន		Commune (ឃុំ Khum)	050806	7
6	Veal Pon	វាលពន់		Commune (ឃុំ Khum)	050807	13
7	Yea Angk	យាអង្គ		Commune (ឃុំ Khum)	050808	14

=== Odongk Maechay Municipality ===
Odongk Maechay contains 5 Quarters (សង្កាត់ Sangkat) and 91 Villages (ភូមិ Phum).

#	Name	Khmer	UNGEGN	Administrative Unit	Geocode	# of Villages
1	Veang Chas	វាំងចាស់		Quarter (សង្កាត់ Sangkat)	050901	11
2	Veal Pong	វាលពង់		Quarter (សង្កាត់ Sangkat)	050902	26
3	Trach Tong	ត្រាចទង		Quarter (សង្កាត់ Sangkat)	050903	17
4	Preah Srae	ព្រះស្រែ		Quarter (សង្កាត់ Sangkat)	050904	18
5	Khsem Khsant	ក្សេមក្សាន្ដ		Quarter (សង្កាត់ Sangkat)	050905	19

=== Samkkei Munichay District ===
Samkkei Munichay contains 10 Communes (ឃុំ Khum) and 160 Villages (ភូមិ Phum).

#	Name	Khmer	UNGEGN	Administrative Unit	Geocode	# of Villages
1	Chan Saen	ចាន់សែន		Commune (ឃុំ Khum)	051001	15
2	Cheung Roas	ជើងរាស់		Commune (ឃុំ Khum)	051002	16
3	Chumpu Proeks	ជំពូព្រឹក្ស		Commune (ឃុំ Khum)	051003	7
4	Krang Chek	ក្រាំងចេក		Commune (ឃុំ Khum)	051004	24
5	Mean Chey	មានជ័យ		Commune (ឃុំ Khum)	051005	14
6	Prey Krasang	ព្រៃក្រសាំង		Commune (ឃុំ Khum)	051006	15
7	Yutth Sameakki	យុទ្ធសាមគ្គី		Commune (ឃុំ Khum)	051007	15
8	Damnak Reang	ដំណាក់រាំង		Commune (ឃុំ Khum)	051008	18
9	Peang Lvea	ពាំងល្វា		Commune (ឃុំ Khum)	051009	18
10	Phnom Touch	ភ្នំតូច		Commune (ឃុំ Khum)	051010	18

== Kampong Thom Province ==
Kampong Thom contains 73 Communes (ឃុំ Khum), 8 Quarters (សង្កាត់ Sangkat) and 765 Villages (ភូមិ Phum).

=== Baray District ===
Baray contains 10 Communes (ឃុំ Khum) and 97 Villages (ភូមិ Phum).

#	Name	Khmer	UNGEGN	Administrative Unit	Geocode	# of Villages
1	Bak Sna	បាក់ស្នា		Commune (ឃុំ Khum)	060101	7
2	Ballangk	បល្ល័ង្គ		Commune (ឃុំ Khum)	060102	15
3	Baray	បារាយណ៍		Commune (ឃុំ Khum)	060103	12
4	Boeng	បឹង		Commune (ឃុំ Khum)	060104	5
5	Chaeung Daeung	ចើងដើង		Commune (ឃុំ Khum)	060105	10
6	Chhuk Khsach	ឈូកខ្សាច់		Commune (ឃុំ Khum)	060107	14
7	Chong Doung	ចុងដូង		Commune (ឃុំ Khum)	060108	8
8	Kokir Thum	គគីធំ		Commune (ឃុំ Khum)	060110	9
9	Krava	ក្រវ៉ា		Commune (ឃុំ Khum)	060111	8
10	Tnaot Chum	ត្នោតជុំ		Commune (ឃុំ Khum)	060117	9

=== Kampong Svay District ===
Kampong Svay contains 11 Communes (ឃុំ Khum) and 97 Villages (ភូមិ Phum).

#	Name	Khmer	UNGEGN	Administrative Unit	Geocode	# of Villages
1	Chey	ជ័យ		Commune (ឃុំ Khum)	060201	6
2	Damrei Slab	ដំរីស្លាប់		Commune (ឃុំ Khum)	060202	5
3	Kampong Kou	កំពង់គោ		Commune (ឃុំ Khum)	060203	5
4	Kampong Svay	កំពង់ស្វាយ		Commune (ឃុំ Khum)	060204	12
5	Nipech	នីពេជ		Commune (ឃុំ Khum)	060205	3
6	Phat Sanday	ផាត់សណ្ដាយ		Commune (ឃុំ Khum)	060206	5
7	San Kor	សាន់គ		Commune (ឃុំ Khum)	060207	14
8	Tbaeng	ត្បែង		Commune (ឃុំ Khum)	060208	15
9	Trapeang Ruessei	ត្រពាំងឫស្សី		Commune (ឃុំ Khum)	060209	20
10	Kdei Doung	ក្ដីដូង		Commune (ឃុំ Khum)	060210	4
11	Prey Kuy	ព្រៃគុយ		Commune (ឃុំ Khum)	060211	8

=== Stueng Saen Municipality ===
Stueng Saen contains 8 Quarters (សង្កាត់ Sangkat) and 39 Villages (ភូមិ Phum).

#	Name	Khmer	UNGEGN	Administrative Unit	Geocode	# of Villages
1	Damrei Choan Khla	ដំរីជាន់ខ្លា		Quarter (សង្កាត់ Sangkat)	060301	4
2	Kampong Thum	កំពង់ធំ		Quarter (សង្កាត់ Sangkat)	060302	7
3	Kampong Roteh	កំពង់រទេះ		Quarter (សង្កាត់ Sangkat)	060303	2
4	Ou Kanthor	អូរកន្ធរ		Quarter (សង្កាត់ Sangkat)	060304	4
5	Kampong Krabau	កំពង់ក្របៅ		Quarter (សង្កាត់ Sangkat)	060306	3
6	Prey Ta Hu	ព្រៃតាហ៊ូ		Quarter (សង្កាត់ Sangkat)	060308	3
7	Achar Leak	អាចារ្យលាក់		Quarter (សង្កាត់ Sangkat)	060309	3
8	Srayov	ស្រយ៉ូវ		Quarter (សង្កាត់ Sangkat)	060310	13

=== Prasat Ballangk District ===
Prasat Ballangk contains 7 Communes (ឃុំ Khum) and 64 Villages (ភូមិ Phum).

#	Name	Khmer	UNGEGN	Administrative Unit	Geocode	# of Villages
1	Doung	ដូង		Commune (ឃុំ Khum)	060401	8
2	Kraya	ក្រយា		Commune (ឃុំ Khum)	060402	6
3	Phan Nheum	ផាន់ញើម		Commune (ឃុំ Khum)	060403	8
4	Sakream	សាគ្រាម		Commune (ឃុំ Khum)	060404	11
5	Sala Visai	សាលាវិស័យ		Commune (ឃុំ Khum)	060405	19
6	Sameakki	សាមគ្គី		Commune (ឃុំ Khum)	060406	5
7	Tuol Kreul	ទួលគ្រើល		Commune (ឃុំ Khum)	060407	7

=== Prasat Sambour District ===
Prasat Sambour contains 5 Communes (ឃុំ Khum) and 66 Villages (ភូមិ Phum).

#	Name	Khmer	UNGEGN	Administrative Unit	Geocode	# of Villages
1	Chhuk	ឈូក		Commune (ឃុំ Khum)	060501	16
2	Koul	គោល		Commune (ឃុំ Khum)	060502	11
3	Sambour	សំបូរណ៍		Commune (ឃុំ Khum)	060503	15
4	Sraeung	ស្រើង		Commune (ឃុំ Khum)	060504	9
5	Tang Krasau	តាំងក្រសៅ		Commune (ឃុំ Khum)	060505	15

=== Sandan District ===
Sandan contains 9 Communes (ឃុំ Khum) and 84 Villages (ភូមិ Phum).

#	Name	Khmer	UNGEGN	Administrative Unit	Geocode	# of Villages
1	Chheu Teal	ឈើទាល		Commune (ឃុំ Khum)	060601	11
2	Dang Kambet	ដងកាំបិត		Commune (ឃុំ Khum)	060602	5
3	Klaeng	ក្លែង		Commune (ឃុំ Khum)	060603	8
4	Mean Rith	មានរិទ្ធ		Commune (ឃុំ Khum)	060604	8
5	Mean Chey	មានជ័យ		Commune (ឃុំ Khum)	060605	11
6	Ngan	ងន		Commune (ឃុំ Khum)	060606	13
7	Sandan	សណ្ដាន់		Commune (ឃុំ Khum)	060607	13
8	Sochet	សុចិត្រ		Commune (ឃុំ Khum)	060608	7
9	Tum Ring	ទំរីង		Commune (ឃុំ Khum)	060609	8

=== Santuk District ===
Santuk contains 10 Communes (ឃុំ Khum) and 92 Villages (ភូមិ Phum).

#	Name	Khmer	UNGEGN	Administrative Unit	Geocode	# of Villages
1	Boeng Lvea	បឹងល្វា		Commune (ឃុំ Khum)	060701	7
2	Chroab	ជ្រាប់		Commune (ឃុំ Khum)	060702	4
3	Kampong Thma	កំពង់ថ្ម		Commune (ឃុំ Khum)	060703	15
4	Kakaoh	កកោះ		Commune (ឃុំ Khum)	060704	10
5	Kraya	ក្រយា		Commune (ឃុំ Khum)	060705	11
6	Pnov	ព្នៅ		Commune (ឃុំ Khum)	060706	3
7	Prasat	ប្រាសាទ		Commune (ឃុំ Khum)	060707	12
8	Tang Krasang	តាំងក្រសាំង		Commune (ឃុំ Khum)	060708	11
9	Ti Pou	ទីពោ		Commune (ឃុំ Khum)	060709	14
10	Tboung Krapeu	ត្បូងក្រពើ		Commune (ឃុំ Khum)	060710	5

=== Stoung District ===
Stoung contains 13 Communes (ឃុំ Khum) and 135 Villages (ភូមិ Phum).

#	Name	Khmer	UNGEGN	Administrative Unit	Geocode	# of Villages
1	Banteay Stoung	បន្ទាយស្ទោង		Commune (ឃុំ Khum)	060801	15
2	Chamna Kraom	ចំណាក្រោម		Commune (ឃុំ Khum)	060802	10
3	Chamna Leu	ចំណាលើ		Commune (ឃុំ Khum)	060803	10
4	Kampong Chen Cheung	កំពង់ចិនជើង		Commune (ឃុំ Khum)	060804	6
5	Kampong Chen Tboung	កំពង់ចិនត្បូង		Commune (ឃុំ Khum)	060805	7
6	Msa Krang	ម្សាក្រង		Commune (ឃុំ Khum)	060806	11
7	Peam Bang	ពាមបាង		Commune (ឃុំ Khum)	060807	3
8	Popok	ពពក		Commune (ឃុំ Khum)	060808	8
9	Pralay	ប្រឡាយ		Commune (ឃុំ Khum)	060809	14
10	Preah Damrei	ព្រះដំរី		Commune (ឃុំ Khum)	060810	9
11	Rung Roeang	រុងរឿង		Commune (ឃុំ Khum)	060811	9
12	Samprouch	សំព្រោជ		Commune (ឃុំ Khum)	060812	17
13	Trea	ទ្រា		Commune (ឃុំ Khum)	060813	16

=== Tang Kouk District ===
Tang Kouk contains 8 Communes (ឃុំ Khum) and 91 Villages (ភូមិ Phum).

#	Name	Khmer	UNGEGN	Administrative Unit	Geocode	# of Villages
1	Pongro	ពង្រ		Commune (ឃុំ Khum)	060901	7
2	Chraneang	ច្រនាង		Commune (ឃុំ Khum)	060902	13
3	Chrolong	ជ្រលង		Commune (ឃុំ Khum)	060903	9
4	Triel	ទ្រៀល		Commune (ឃុំ Khum)	060904	22
5	Sou Young	សូយោង		Commune (ឃុំ Khum)	060905	11
6	Sralau	ស្រឡៅ		Commune (ឃុំ Khum)	060906	15
7	Svay Phleung	ស្វាយភ្លើង		Commune (ឃុំ Khum)	060907	7
8	Andoung Pou	អណ្ដូងពោធិ៍		Commune (ឃុំ Khum)	060908	7

== Kampot Province ==
Kampot contains 85 Communes (ឃុំ Khum), 8 Quarters (សង្កាត់ Sangkat) and 491 Villages (ភូមិ Phum).

=== Angkor Chey District ===
Angkor Chey contains 11 Communes (ឃុំ Khum) and 79 Villages (ភូមិ Phum).

#	Name	Khmer	UNGEGN	Administrative Unit	Geocode	# of Villages
1	Angk Phnum Touch	អង្គភ្នំតូច		Commune (ឃុំ Khum)	070101	5
2	Ankor Chey	អង្គរជ័យ		Commune (ឃុំ Khum)	070102	6
3	Champei	ចំប៉ី		Commune (ឃុំ Khum)	070103	8
4	Dambouk Khpos	ដំបូកខ្ពស់		Commune (ឃុំ Khum)	070104	11
5	Dan Koum	ដានគោម		Commune (ឃុំ Khum)	070105	6
6	Daeum Doung	ដើមដូង		Commune (ឃុំ Khum)	070106	4
7	Mroum	ម្រោម		Commune (ឃុំ Khum)	070107	6
8	Phnum Kong	ភ្នំកុង		Commune (ឃុំ Khum)	070108	10
9	Praphnum	ប្រភ្នំ		Commune (ឃុំ Khum)	070109	9
10	Samlanh	សំឡាញ		Commune (ឃុំ Khum)	070110	7
11	Tani	តានី		Commune (ឃុំ Khum)	070111	7

=== Banteay Meas District ===
Banteay Meas contains 15 Communes (ឃុំ Khum) and 88 Villages (ភូមិ Phum).

#	Name	Khmer	UNGEGN	Administrative Unit	Geocode	# of Villages
1	Banteay Meas Khang Kaeut	បន្ទាយមាសខាងកើត		Commune (ឃុំ Khum)	070201	8
2	Banteay Meas Khang lech	បន្ទាយមាសខាងលិច		Commune (ឃុំ Khum)	070202	9
3	Prey Tonle	ព្រៃទន្លេ		Commune (ឃុំ Khum)	070203	5
4	Samraong Kraom	សំរោងក្រោម		Commune (ឃុំ Khum)	070204	6
5	Samraong Leu	សំរោងលើ		Commune (ឃុំ Khum)	070205	5
6	Sdach Kong Khang Cheung	ស្ដេចគង់ខាងជើង		Commune (ឃុំ Khum)	070206	4
7	Sdach Kong Khang lech	ស្ដេចគង់ខាងលិច		Commune (ឃុំ Khum)	070207	5
8	Sdach Kong Khang Tboung	ស្ដេចគង់ខាងត្បូង		Commune (ឃុំ Khum)	070208	4
9	Tnoat Chong Srang	ត្នោតចុងស្រង់		Commune (ឃុំ Khum)	070209	8
10	Trapeang Sala Khang Kaeut	ត្រពាំងសាលាខាងកើត		Commune (ឃុំ Khum)	070210	5
11	Trapeang Sala Khang Lech	ត្រពាំងសាលាខាងលិច		Commune (ឃុំ Khum)	070211	5
12	Tuk Meas Khang Kaeut	ទូកមាសខាងកើត		Commune (ឃុំ Khum)	070212	6
13	Tuk Meas Khang Lech	ទូកមាសខាងលិច		Commune (ឃុំ Khum)	070213	8
14	Voat Angk Khang Cheung	វត្ដអង្គខាងជើង		Commune (ឃុំ Khum)	070214	5
15	Voat Angk Khang Tboung	វត្ដអង្គខាងត្បូង		Commune (ឃុំ Khum)	070215	5

=== Chhuk District ===
Chhuk contains 15 Communes (ឃុំ Khum) and 80 Villages (ភូមិ Phum).

#	Name	Khmer	UNGEGN	Administrative Unit	Geocode	# of Villages
1	Baniev	បានៀវ		Commune (ឃុំ Khum)	070301	5
2	Takaen	តាកែន		Commune (ឃុំ Khum)	070302	12
3	Boeng Nimol	បឹងនិមល		Commune (ឃុំ Khum)	070303	4
4	Chhuk	ឈូក		Commune (ឃុំ Khum)	070304	4
5	Doun Yay	ដូនយ៉យ		Commune (ឃុំ Khum)	070305	5
6	Krang Sbov	ក្រាំងស្បូវ		Commune (ឃុំ Khum)	070306	5
7	Krang Snay	ក្រាំងស្នាយ		Commune (ឃុំ Khum)	070307	6
8	Lbaeuk	ល្បើក		Commune (ឃុំ Khum)	070308	5
9	Trapeang Phleang	ត្រពាំងភ្លាំង		Commune (ឃុំ Khum)	070309	6
10	Mean Chey	មានជ័យ		Commune (ឃុំ Khum)	070310	5
11	Neareay	នារាយណ៍		Commune (ឃុំ Khum)	070311	4
12	Satv Pong	សត្វពង		Commune (ឃុំ Khum)	070312	4
13	Trapeang Bei	ត្រពាំងបី		Commune (ឃុំ Khum)	070313	4
14	Tramaeng	ត្រមែង		Commune (ឃុំ Khum)	070314	5
15	Dechou Akphivoadth	តេជោអភិវឌ្ឍន៍		Commune (ឃុំ Khum)	070315	6

=== Chum Kiri District ===
Chum Kiri contains 7 Communes (ឃុំ Khum) and 39 Villages (ភូមិ Phum).

#	Name	Khmer	UNGEGN	Administrative Unit	Geocode	# of Villages
1	Chres	ច្រេស		Commune (ឃុំ Khum)	070401	5
2	Chumpu Voan	ជំពូវន្ដ		Commune (ឃុំ Khum)	070402	8
3	Snay Anhchit	ស្នាយអញ្ជិត		Commune (ឃុំ Khum)	070403	5
4	Srae Chaeng	ស្រែចែង		Commune (ឃុំ Khum)	070404	5
5	Srae Knong	ស្រែក្នុង		Commune (ឃុំ Khum)	070405	6
6	Srae Samraong	ស្រែសំរោង		Commune (ឃុំ Khum)	070406	5
7	Trapeang Reang	ត្រពាំងរាំង		Commune (ឃុំ Khum)	070407	5

=== Dang Tong District ===
Dang Tong contains 10 Communes (ឃុំ Khum) and 54 Villages (ភូមិ Phum).

#	Name	Khmer	UNGEGN	Administrative Unit	Geocode	# of Villages
1	Damnak Sokram	ដំណាក់សុក្រំ		Commune (ឃុំ Khum)	070501	5
2	Dang Tong	ដងទង់		Commune (ឃុំ Khum)	070502	11
3	Khcheay Khang Cheung	ឃ្ជាយខាងជើង		Commune (ឃុំ Khum)	070503	5
4	Khcheay Khang Tboung	ខ្ជាយខាងត្បូង		Commune (ឃុំ Khum)	070504	4
5	Mean Ritth	មានរិទ្ធិ		Commune (ឃុំ Khum)	070505	4
6	Srae Chea Khang Cheung	ស្រែជាខាងជើង		Commune (ឃុំ Khum)	070506	4
7	Srae Chea Khang Tboung	ស្រែជាខាងត្បូង		Commune (ឃុំ Khum)	070507	3
8	Totung	ទទុង		Commune (ឃុំ Khum)	070508	9
9	Angk Romeas	អង្គ រមាស		Commune (ឃុំ Khum)	070509	5
10	L'ang	ល្អាង		Commune (ឃុំ Khum)	070510	4

=== Kampong Trach District ===
Kampong Trach contains 14 Communes (ឃុំ Khum) and 70 Villages (ភូមិ Phum).

#	Name	Khmer	UNGEGN	Administrative Unit	Geocode	# of Villages
1	Boeng Sala Khang Cheung	បឹងសាលាខាងជើង		Commune (ឃុំ Khum)	070601	4
2	Boeng Sala Khang Tboung	បឹងសាលាខាងត្បូង		Commune (ឃុំ Khum)	070602	4
3	Damnak Kantuot Khang Cheung	ដំណាក់កន្ទួតខាងជើង		Commune (ឃុំ Khum)	070603	4
4	Damnak Kantuot Khang Tboung	ដំណាក់កន្ទួតខាងត្បូង		Commune (ឃុំ Khum)	070604	5
5	Kampong Trach Khang Kaeut	កំពង់ត្រាចខាងកើត		Commune (ឃុំ Khum)	070605	4
6	Kampong Trach Khang Lech	កំពង់ត្រាចខាងលិច		Commune (ឃុំ Khum)	070606	7
7	Prasat Phnom Khyang	ប្រាសាទភ្នំខ្យង		Commune (ឃុំ Khum)	070607	3
8	Phnom Prasat	ភ្នំប្រាសាទ		Commune (ឃុំ Khum)	070608	7
9	Ang Sophy	អង្គសុរភី		Commune (ឃុំ Khum)	070609	6
10	Preaek Kroes	ព្រែកក្រឹស		Commune (ឃុំ Khum)	070612	7
11	Ruessei Srok Khang Kaeut	ឫស្សីស្រុកខាងកើត		Commune (ឃុំ Khum)	070613	4
12	Ruessei Srok Khang Lech	ឫស្សីស្រុកខាងលិច		Commune (ឃុំ Khum)	070614	6
13	Svay Tong Khang Cheung	ស្វាយទងខាងជើង		Commune (ឃុំ Khum)	070615	4
14	Svay Tong Khang Tboung	ស្វាយទងខាងត្បូង		Commune (ឃុំ Khum)	070616	5

=== Tuek Chhou District ===
Tuek Chhou contains 13 Communes (ឃុំ Khum) and 55 Villages (ភូមិ Phum).

#	Name	Khmer	UNGEGN	Administrative Unit	Geocode	# of Villages
1	Chum Kriel	ជុំគ្រៀល		Commune (ឃុំ Khum)	070702	4
2	Kampong Kraeng	កំពង់ក្រែង		Commune (ឃុំ Khum)	070703	5
3	Kampong Samraong	កំពង់សំរោង		Commune (ឃុំ Khum)	070704	3
4	Kandaol	កណ្ដោល		Commune (ឃុំ Khum)	070705	5
5	Koun Satv	កូនសត្វ		Commune (ឃុំ Khum)	070708	4
6	Makprang	ម៉ាក់ប្រាង្គ		Commune (ឃុំ Khum)	070709	3
7	Prey Khmum	ព្រៃឃ្មុំ		Commune (ឃុំ Khum)	070712	4
8	Prey Thnang	ព្រៃថ្នង		Commune (ឃុំ Khum)	070713	5
9	Stueng Kaev	ស្ទឹងកែវ		Commune (ឃុំ Khum)	070715	5
10	Thmei	ថ្មី		Commune (ឃុំ Khum)	070716	6
11	Trapeang Pring	ត្រពាំងព្រីង		Commune (ឃុំ Khum)	070717	4
12	Trapeang Sangkae	ត្រពាំងសង្កែ		Commune (ឃុំ Khum)	070718	3
13	Trapeang Thum	ត្រពាំងធំ		Commune (ឃុំ Khum)	070719	4

=== Kampot Municipality ===
Kampot contains 5 Quarters (សង្កាត់ Sangkat) and 15 Villages (ភូមិ Phum).

#	Name	Khmer	UNGEGN	Administrative Unit	Geocode	# of Villages
1	Kampong Kandal	កំពង់កណ្ដាល		Quarter (សង្កាត់ Sangkat)	070801	2
2	Krang Ampil	ក្រាំងអំពិល		Quarter (សង្កាត់ Sangkat)	070802	2
3	Kampong Bay	កំពង់បាយ		Quarter (សង្កាត់ Sangkat)	070803	2
4	Andoung Khmer	អណ្ដូងខ្មែរ		Quarter (សង្កាត់ Sangkat)	070804	5
5	Traeuy Kaoh	ត្រើយកោះ		Quarter (សង្កាត់ Sangkat)	070805	4

=== Bokor Municipality ===
Bokor contains 3 Quarters (សង្កាត់ Sangkat) and 11 Villages (ភូមិ Phum).

#	Name	Khmer	UNGEGN	Administrative Unit	Geocode	# of Villages
1	Boeng Tuk	បឹងទូក		Quarter (សង្កាត់ Sangkat)	070901	3
2	Kaoh Touch	កោះតូច		Quarter (សង្កាត់ Sangkat)	070902	4
3	Preaek Tnoat	ព្រែកត្នោត		Quarter (សង្កាត់ Sangkat)	070903	4

== Kandal Province ==
Kandal contains 101 Communes (ឃុំ Khum), 26 Quarters (សង្កាត់ Sangkat) and 1,010 Villages (ភូមិ Phum).

=== Kandal Stueng District ===
Kandal Stueng contains 18 Communes (ឃុំ Khum) and 127 Villages (ភូមិ Phum).

#	Name	Khmer	UNGEGN	Administrative Unit	Geocode	# of Villages
1	Ampov Prey	អំពៅព្រៃ		Commune (ឃុំ Khum)	080101	9
2	Anlong Romiet	អន្លង់រមៀត		Commune (ឃុំ Khum)	080102	6
3	Barku	បារគូ		Commune (ឃុំ Khum)	080103	7
4	Boeng Khyang	បឹងខ្យាង		Commune (ឃុំ Khum)	080104	6
5	Cheung Kaeub	ជើងកើប		Commune (ឃុំ Khum)	080105	6
6	Daeum Rues	ដើមឫស		Commune (ឃុំ Khum)	080106	14
7	Kandaok	កណ្ដោក		Commune (ឃុំ Khum)	080107	7
8	Thmei	ថ្មី		Commune (ឃុំ Khum)	080108	5
9	Kouk Trab	គោកត្រប់		Commune (ឃុំ Khum)	080109	9
10	Preah Putth	ព្រះពុទ្ធ		Commune (ឃុំ Khum)	080113	5
11	Preaek Roka	ព្រែករកា		Commune (ឃុំ Khum)	080115	4
12	Preaek Slaeng	ព្រែកស្លែង		Commune (ឃុំ Khum)	080116	4
13	Roka	រកា		Commune (ឃុំ Khum)	080117	7
14	Roleang Kaen	រលាំងកែន		Commune (ឃុំ Khum)	080118	11
15	Siem Reap	សៀមរាប	Siĕm Réab	Commune (ឃុំ Khum)	080122	6
16	Tbaeng	ត្បែង		Commune (ឃុំ Khum)	080125	7
17	Trapeang Veaeng	ត្រពាំងវែង		Commune (ឃុំ Khum)	080127	5
18	Trea	ទ្រា		Commune (ឃុំ Khum)	080128	9

=== Kien Svay District ===
Kien Svay contains 8 Communes (ឃុំ Khum) and 67 Villages (ភូមិ Phum).

#	Name	Khmer	UNGEGN	Administrative Unit	Geocode	# of Villages
1	Banteay Daek	បន្ទាយដែក		Commune (ឃុំ Khum)	080201	6
2	Chheu Teal	ឈើទាល		Commune (ឃុំ Khum)	080202	8
3	Dei Edth	ដីឥដ្ឋ		Commune (ឃុំ Khum)	080203	10
4	Kampong Svay	កំពង់ស្វាយ		Commune (ឃុំ Khum)	080204	6
5	Kokir	គគីរ		Commune (ឃុំ Khum)	080206	12
6	Kokir Thum	គគីរធំ		Commune (ឃុំ Khum)	080207	7
7	Phum Thum	ភូមិធំ		Commune (ឃុំ Khum)	080208	5
8	Samraong Thum	សំរោងធំ		Commune (ឃុំ Khum)	080211	13

=== Khsach Kandal District ===
Khsach Kandal contains 12 Communes (ឃុំ Khum) and 67 Villages (ភូមិ Phum).

#	Name	Khmer	UNGEGN	Administrative Unit	Geocode	# of Villages
1	Chey Thum	ជ័យធំ		Commune (ឃុំ Khum)	080302	6
2	Kampong Chamlang	កំពង់ចំលង		Commune (ឃុំ Khum)	080303	3
3	Kaoh Chouram	កោះចូរ៉ាម		Commune (ឃុំ Khum)	080304	4
4	Preah Prasab	ព្រះប្រសប់		Commune (ឃុំ Khum)	080306	4
5	Preaek Ta Meak	ព្រែកតាមាក់		Commune (ឃុំ Khum)	080310	10
6	Puk Ruessei	ពុកឫស្សី		Commune (ឃុំ Khum)	080311	6
7	Roka Chonlueng	រកាជន្លឹង		Commune (ឃុំ Khum)	080312	5
8	Sanlung	សន្លុង		Commune (ឃុំ Khum)	080313	6
9	Sithor	ស៊ីធរ		Commune (ឃុំ Khum)	080314	6
10	Svay Romiet	ស្វាយរមៀត		Commune (ឃុំ Khum)	080316	6
11	Ta Aek	តាឯក		Commune (ឃុំ Khum)	080317	3
12	Vihear Suork	វិហារសួគ៌		Commune (ឃុំ Khum)	080318	8

=== Kaoh Thum District ===
Kaoh Thum contains 6 Communes (ឃុំ Khum) and 60 Villages (ភូមិ Phum).

#	Name	Khmer	UNGEGN	Administrative Unit	Geocode	# of Villages
1	Kampong Kong	កំពង់កុង		Commune (ឃុំ Khum)	080403	12
2	Kaoh Thum Ka	កោះធំ ‹ក›		Commune (ឃុំ Khum)	080404	7
3	Kaoh Thum Kha	កោះធំ ‹ខ›		Commune (ឃុំ Khum)	080405	5
4	Leuk Daek	លើកដែក		Commune (ឃុំ Khum)	080407	15
5	Pouthi Ban	ពោធិ៍បាន		Commune (ឃុំ Khum)	080408	9
6	Preaek Thmei	ព្រែកថ្មី		Commune (ឃុំ Khum)	080411	12

=== Leuk Daek District ===
Leuk Daek contains 7 Communes (ឃុំ Khum) and 25 Villages (ភូមិ Phum).

#	Name	Khmer	UNGEGN	Administrative Unit	Geocode	# of Villages
1	Kampong Phnum	កំពង់ភ្នំ		Commune (ឃុំ Khum)	080501	4
2	K'am Samnar	ក្អមសំណរ		Commune (ឃុំ Khum)	080502	3
3	Khpob Ateav	ខ្ពបអាទាវ		Commune (ឃុំ Khum)	080503	3
4	Peam Reang	ពាមរាំង		Commune (ឃុំ Khum)	080504	4
5	Preaek Dach	ព្រែកដាច់		Commune (ឃុំ Khum)	080505	4
6	Preaek Tonloab	ព្រែកទន្លាប់		Commune (ឃុំ Khum)	080506	4
7	Sandar	សណ្ដារ		Commune (ឃុំ Khum)	080507	3

=== Lvea Aem District ===
Lvea Aem contains 10 Communes (ឃុំ Khum) and 27 Villages (ភូមិ Phum).

#	Name	Khmer	UNGEGN	Administrative Unit	Geocode	# of Villages
1	Boeng Krum	បឹងគ្រំ		Commune (ឃុំ Khum)	080603	2
2	Kaoh Kaev	កោះកែវ		Commune (ឃុំ Khum)	080604	2
3	Kaoh Reah	កោះរះ		Commune (ឃុំ Khum)	080605	2
4	Lvea Sar	ល្វាសរ		Commune (ឃុំ Khum)	080606	3
5	Phum Thum	ភូមិធំ		Commune (ឃុំ Khum)	080608	2
6	Preaek Rey	ព្រែករៃ		Commune (ឃុំ Khum)	080610	3
7	Preaek Ruessei	ព្រែកឫស្សី		Commune (ឃុំ Khum)	080611	5
8	Sambuor	សំបួរ		Commune (ឃុំ Khum)	080612	3
9	Thma Kor	ថ្មគរ		Commune (ឃុំ Khum)	080614	2
10	Tuek Khleang	ទឹកឃ្លាំង		Commune (ឃុំ Khum)	080615	3

=== Mukh Kampul District ===
Mukh Kampul contains 7 Communes (ឃុំ Khum) and 39 Villages (ភូមិ Phum).

#	Name	Khmer	UNGEGN	Administrative Unit	Geocode	# of Villages
1	Preaek Anhchanh	ព្រែកអញ្ចាញ		Commune (ឃុំ Khum)	080703	7
2	Preaek Dambang	ព្រែកដំបង		Commune (ឃុំ Khum)	080704	5
3	Roka Kong Ti Muoy	រកាកោង ទី ១		Commune (ឃុំ Khum)	080707	4
4	Roka Kong Ti Pir	រកាកោង ទី ២		Commune (ឃុំ Khum)	080708	4
5	Ruessei Chrouy	ឫស្សីជ្រោយ		Commune (ឃុំ Khum)	080709	7
6	Sambuor Meas	សំបួរមាស		Commune (ឃុំ Khum)	080710	7
7	Svay Ampear	ស្វាយអំពារ		Commune (ឃុំ Khum)	080711	5

=== Angk Snuol District ===
Angk Snuol contains 10 Communes (ឃុំ Khum) and 200 Villages (ភូមិ Phum).

#	Name	Khmer	UNGEGN	Administrative Unit	Geocode	# of Villages
1	Baek Chan	បែកចាន		Commune (ឃុំ Khum)	080801	21
2	Chhak Chheu Neang	ឆក់ឈើនាង		Commune (ឃុំ Khum)	080803	10
3	Damnak Ampil	ដំណាក់អំពិល		Commune (ឃុំ Khum)	080804	10
4	Krang Mkak	ក្រាំងម្កាក់		Commune (ឃុំ Khum)	080807	15
5	Lumhach	លំហាច		Commune (ឃុំ Khum)	080808	20
6	Mkak	ម្កាក់		Commune (ឃុំ Khum)	080809	29
7	Peuk	ពើក		Commune (ឃុំ Khum)	080811	19
8	Prey Puoch	ព្រៃពួច		Commune (ឃុំ Khum)	080813	23
9	Samraong Leu	សំរោងលើ		Commune (ឃុំ Khum)	080814	28
10	Tuol Prech	ទួលព្រេជ		Commune (ឃុំ Khum)	080816	25

=== Ponhea Lueu District ===
Ponhea Lueu contains 11 Communes (ឃុំ Khum) and 124 Villages (ភូមិ Phum).

#	Name	Khmer	UNGEGN	Administrative Unit	Geocode	# of Villages
1	Chhveang	ឈ្វាំង		Commune (ឃុំ Khum)	080901	16
2	Chrey Loas	ជ្រៃលាស់		Commune (ឃុំ Khum)	080902	15
3	Kampong Luong	កំពង់ហ្លួង		Commune (ឃុំ Khum)	080903	8
4	Kampong Os	កំពង់អុស		Commune (ឃុំ Khum)	080904	5
5	Kaoh Chen	កោះចិន		Commune (ឃុំ Khum)	080905	11
6	Phnum Bat	ភ្នំបាត		Commune (ឃុំ Khum)	080906	22
7	Ponhea Lueu	ពញាឮ		Commune (ឃុំ Khum)	080907	3
8	Preaek Ta Teaen	ព្រែកតាទែន		Commune (ឃុំ Khum)	080910	3
9	Phsar Daek	ផ្សារដែក		Commune (ឃុំ Khum)	080911	10
10	Tumnob Thum	ទំនប់ធំ		Commune (ឃុំ Khum)	080913	19
11	Vihear Luong	វិហារហ្លួង		Commune (ឃុំ Khum)	080914	12

=== S'ang District ===
S'ang contains 12 Communes (ឃុំ Khum) and 120 Villages (ភូមិ Phum).

#	Name	Khmer	UNGEGN	Administrative Unit	Geocode	# of Villages
1	Khpob	ខ្ពប		Commune (ឃុំ Khum)	081001	10
2	Kaoh Khael	កោះខែល		Commune (ឃុំ Khum)	081003	6
3	Kaoh Khsach Tonlea	កោះខ្សាច់ទន្លា		Commune (ឃុំ Khum)	081004	8
4	Krang Yov	ក្រាំងយ៉ូវ		Commune (ឃុំ Khum)	081005	19
5	Prasat	ប្រាសាទ		Commune (ឃុំ Khum)	081006	5
6	Preaek Ambel	ព្រែកអំបិល		Commune (ឃុំ Khum)	081007	16
7	Preaek Koy	ព្រែកគយ		Commune (ឃុំ Khum)	081008	10
8	S'ang Phnum	ស្អាងភ្នំ		Commune (ឃុំ Khum)	081010	9
9	Svay Prateal	ស្វាយប្រទាល		Commune (ឃុំ Khum)	081012	9
10	Ta Lon	តាលន់		Commune (ឃុំ Khum)	081014	9
11	Traeuy Sla	ត្រើយស្លា		Commune (ឃុំ Khum)	081015	9
12	Tuek Vil	ទឹកវិល		Commune (ឃុំ Khum)	081016	10

=== Ta Khmau Municipality ===
Ta Khmau contains 10 Quarters (សង្កាត់ Sangkat) and 59 Villages (ភូមិ Phum).

#	Name	Khmer	UNGEGN	Administrative Unit	Geocode	# of Villages
1	Ta Kdol	តាក្ដុល		Quarter (សង្កាត់ Sangkat)	081101	4
2	Prek Ruessey	ព្រែកឫស្សី		Quarter (សង្កាត់ Sangkat)	081102	5
3	Doeum Mien	ដើមមៀន		Quarter (សង្កាត់ Sangkat)	081103	6
4	Ta Khmao	តាខ្មៅ		Quarter (សង្កាត់ Sangkat)	081104	11
5	Prek Ho	ព្រែកហូរ		Quarter (សង្កាត់ Sangkat)	081105	6
6	Kampong Samnanh	កំពង់សំណាញ់		Quarter (សង្កាត់ Sangkat)	081106	6
7	Svay Rolum	ស្វាយរលំ		Quarter (សង្កាត់ Sangkat)	081107	6
8	Kaoh Anlong Chen	កោះអន្លង់ចិន		Quarter (សង្កាត់ Sangkat)	081108	4
9	Setbou	សិត្បូ		Quarter (សង្កាត់ Sangkat)	081109	4
10	Roka Khpos	រកាខ្ពស់		Quarter (សង្កាត់ Sangkat)	081110	7

=== Sampeou Poun Municipality ===
Sampeou Poun contains 5 Quarters (សង្កាត់ Sangkat) and 53 Villages (ភូមិ Phum).

#	Name	Khmer	UNGEGN	Administrative Unit	Geocode	# of Villages
1	Chheu Kmau	ឈើខ្មៅ		Quarter (សង្កាត់ Sangkat)	081201	11
2	Preaek Chrey	ព្រែកជ្រៃ		Quarter (សង្កាត់ Sangkat)	081202	7
3	Preaek Sdei	ព្រែកស្ដី		Quarter (សង្កាត់ Sangkat)	081203	15
4	Chrouy Ta Kaev	ជ្រោយតាកែវ		Quarter (សង្កាត់ Sangkat)	081204	9
5	Sampeou Poun	សំពៅពូន		Quarter (សង្កាត់ Sangkat)	081205	11

=== Akreiy Ksatr Municipality ===
Akreiy Ksatr contains 11 Quarters (សង្កាត់ Sangkat) and 42 Villages (ភូមិ Phum).

#	Name	Khmer	UNGEGN	Administrative Unit	Geocode	# of Villages
1	Bak Dav	បាក់ដាវ		Quarter (សង្កាត់ Sangkat)	081301	4
2	Kaoh Oknha Tei	កោះឧកញ៉ាតី		Quarter (សង្កាត់ Sangkat)	081302	5
3	Preaek Ampil	ព្រែកអំពិល		Quarter (សង្កាត់ Sangkat)	081303	7
4	Preaek Luong	ព្រែកលួង		Quarter (សង្កាត់ Sangkat)	081304	4
5	Preaek Ta kov	ព្រែកតាកូវ		Quarter (សង្កាត់ Sangkat)	081305	3
6	Svay Chrum	ស្វាយជ្រំ		Quarter (សង្កាត់ Sangkat)	081306	3
7	Akreiy Ksatr	អរិយក្សត្រ		Quarter (សង្កាត់ Sangkat)	081307	4
8	Sarikakaev	សារិកាកែវ		Quarter (សង្កាត់ Sangkat)	081308	3
9	Peam Oknha Ong	ពាមឧកញ៉ាអុង		Quarter (សង្កាត់ Sangkat)	081309	5
10	Preaek Kmeng	ព្រែកក្មេង		Quarter (សង្កាត់ Sangkat)	081310	2
11	Barong	បារុង		Quarter (សង្កាត់ Sangkat)	081311	2

== Koh Kong Province ==
Koh Kong contains 26 Communes (ឃុំ Khum), 3 Quarters (សង្កាត់ Sangkat) and 119 Villages (ភូមិ Phum).

=== Botum Sakor District ===
Botum Sakor contains 4 Communes (ឃុំ Khum) and 21 Villages (ភូមិ Phum).

#	Name	Khmer	UNGEGN	Administrative Unit	Geocode	# of Villages
1	Andoung Tuek	អណ្ដូងទឹក		Commune (ឃុំ Khum)	090101	7
2	Kandaol	កណ្ដោល		Commune (ឃុំ Khum)	090102	5
3	Ta Noun	តានូន		Commune (ឃុំ Khum)	090103	4
4	Thma Sa	ថ្មស		Commune (ឃុំ Khum)	090104	5

=== Kiri Sakor District ===
Kiri Sakor contains 3 Communes (ឃុំ Khum) and 9 Villages (ភូមិ Phum).

#	Name	Khmer	UNGEGN	Administrative Unit	Geocode	# of Villages
1	Kaoh Sdach	កោះស្ដេច		Commune (ឃុំ Khum)	090201	3
2	Phnhi Meas	ភ្ញីមាស		Commune (ឃុំ Khum)	090202	3
3	Preaek Khsach	ព្រែកខ្សាច់		Commune (ឃុំ Khum)	090203	3

=== Kaoh Kong District ===
Kaoh Kong contains 4 Communes (ឃុំ Khum) and 11 Villages (ភូមិ Phum).

#	Name	Khmer	UNGEGN	Administrative Unit	Geocode	# of Villages
1	Chrouy Pras	ជ្រោយប្រស់		Commune (ឃុំ Khum)	090301	2
2	Kaoh Kapi	កោះកាពិ		Commune (ឃុំ Khum)	090302	3
3	Ta Tai Kraom	តាតៃក្រោម		Commune (ឃុំ Khum)	090303	2
4	Trapeang Rung	ត្រពាំងរូង		Commune (ឃុំ Khum)	090304	4

=== Khemara Phoumin Municipality ===
Khemara Phoumin contains 3 Quarters (សង្កាត់ Sangkat) and 11 Villages (ភូមិ Phum).

#	Name	Khmer	UNGEGN	Administrative Unit	Geocode	# of Villages
1	Smach Mean Chey	ស្មាច់មានជ័យ		Quarter (សង្កាត់ Sangkat)	090401	5
2	Dang Tong	ដងទង់		Quarter (សង្កាត់ Sangkat)	090402	4
3	Stueng Veaeng	ស្ទឹងវែង		Quarter (សង្កាត់ Sangkat)	090403	2

=== Mondol Seima District ===
Mondol Seima contains 3 Communes (ឃុំ Khum) and 13 Villages (ភូមិ Phum).

#	Name	Khmer	UNGEGN	Administrative Unit	Geocode	# of Villages
1	Pak Khlang	ប៉ាក់ខ្លង		Commune (ឃុំ Khum)	090501	7
2	Peam Krasaob	ពាមក្រសោប		Commune (ឃុំ Khum)	090502	2
3	Tuol Kokir	ទួលគគីរ		Commune (ឃុំ Khum)	090503	4

=== Srae Ambel District ===
Srae Ambel contains 6 Communes (ឃុំ Khum) and 37 Villages (ភូមិ Phum).

#	Name	Khmer	UNGEGN	Administrative Unit	Geocode	# of Villages
1	Boeng Preav	បឹងព្រាវ		Commune (ឃុំ Khum)	090601	6
2	Chi Kha Kraom	ជី ខ ក្រោម		Commune (ឃុំ Khum)	090602	6
3	Chi kha Leu	ជី ខ លើ		Commune (ឃុំ Khum)	090603	4
4	Chrouy Svay	ជ្រោយស្វាយ		Commune (ឃុំ Khum)	090604	7
5	Dang Peaeng	ដងពែង		Commune (ឃុំ Khum)	090605	7
6	Srae Ambel	ស្រែអំបិល		Commune (ឃុំ Khum)	090606	7

=== Thma Bang District ===
Thma Bang contains 6 Communes (ឃុំ Khum) and 17 Villages (ភូមិ Phum).

#	Name	Khmer	UNGEGN	Administrative Unit	Geocode	# of Villages
1	Ta Tey Leu	តាទៃលើ		Commune (ឃុំ Khum)	090701	3
2	Pralay	ប្រឡាយ		Commune (ឃុំ Khum)	090702	4
3	Chumnoab	ជំនាប់		Commune (ឃុំ Khum)	090703	2
4	Ruessei Chrum	ឫស្សីជ្រុំ		Commune (ឃុំ Khum)	090704	2
5	Chi Phat	ជីផាត		Commune (ឃុំ Khum)	090705	4
6	Thma Doun Pov	ថ្មដូនពៅ		Commune (ឃុំ Khum)	090706	2

== Kratié Province ==
Kratié contains 43 Communes (ឃុំ Khum), 5 Quarters (សង្កាត់ Sangkat) and 327 Villages (ភូមិ Phum).

=== Chhloung District ===
Chhloung contains 8 Communes (ឃុំ Khum) and 50 Villages (ភូមិ Phum).

#	Name	Khmer	UNGEGN	Administrative Unit	Geocode	# of Villages
1	Chhloung	ឆ្លូង		Commune (ឃុំ Khum)	100101	6
2	Damrei Phong	ដំរីផុង		Commune (ឃុំ Khum)	100102	11
3	Han Chey	ហាន់ជ័យ		Commune (ឃុំ Khum)	100103	4
4	Kampong Damrei	កំពង់ដំរី		Commune (ឃុំ Khum)	100104	6
5	Kanhchor	កញ្ជរ		Commune (ឃុំ Khum)	100105	5
6	Khsach Andeth	ខ្សាច់អណ្ដែត		Commune (ឃុំ Khum)	100106	5
7	Pongro	ពង្រ		Commune (ឃុំ Khum)	100107	5
8	Preaek Saman	ព្រែកសាម៉ាន់		Commune (ឃុំ Khum)	100108	8

=== Kracheh Municipality ===
Kracheh contains 5 Quarters (សង្កាត់ Sangkat) and 19 Villages (ភូមិ Phum).

#	Name	Khmer	UNGEGN	Administrative Unit	Geocode	# of Villages
1	Kaoh Trong	កោះទ្រង់		Quarter (សង្កាត់ Sangkat)	100207	2
2	Krakor	ក្រគរ		Quarter (សង្កាត់ Sangkat)	100208	2
3	Kracheh	ក្រចេះ		Quarter (សង្កាត់ Sangkat)	100209	5
4	Ou Ruessei	អូរឫស្សី		Quarter (សង្កាត់ Sangkat)	100210	8
5	Roka Kandal	រកាកណ្ដាល		Quarter (សង្កាត់ Sangkat)	100211	2

=== Prek Prasab District ===
Prek Prasab contains 8 Communes (ឃុំ Khum) and 61 Villages (ភូមិ Phum).

#	Name	Khmer	UNGEGN	Administrative Unit	Geocode	# of Villages
1	Chambâk	ចំបក់		Commune (ឃុំ Khum)	100301	7
2	Chrouy Banteay	ជ្រោយបន្ទាយ		Commune (ឃុំ Khum)	100302	12
3	Kampong Kor	កំពង់គរ		Commune (ឃុំ Khum)	100303	4
4	Koh Ta Suy	កោះតាស៊ុយ		Commune (ឃុំ Khum)	100304	3
5	Preaek Prasab	ព្រែកប្រសព្វ		Commune (ឃុំ Khum)	100305	13
6	Russey Keo	ឫស្សីកែវ		Commune (ឃុំ Khum)	100306	4
7	Saob	សោប		Commune (ឃុំ Khum)	100307	11
8	Ta Mao	តាម៉ៅ		Commune (ឃុំ Khum)	100308	7

=== Sambour District ===
Sambour contains 6 Communes (ឃុំ Khum) and 34 Villages (ភូមិ Phum).

#	Name	Khmer	UNGEGN	Administrative Unit	Geocode	# of Villages
1	Boeng Char	បឹងចារ		Commune (ឃុំ Khum)	100401	5
2	Kampong Cham	កំពង់ចាម		Commune (ឃុំ Khum)	100402	7
3	Kaoh Khnhaer	កោះខ្ញែរ		Commune (ឃុំ Khum)	100404	5
4	Sambour	សំបូរ		Commune (ឃុំ Khum)	100407	7
5	Sandan	សណ្ដាន់		Commune (ឃុំ Khum)	100408	4
6	Voadthonak	វឌ្ឍនៈ		Commune (ឃុំ Khum)	100410	6

=== Snuol District ===
Snuol contains 6 Communes (ឃុំ Khum) and 69 Villages (ភូមិ Phum).

#	Name	Khmer	UNGEGN	Administrative Unit	Geocode	# of Villages
1	Khsuem	ឃ្សឹម		Commune (ឃុំ Khum)	100501	10
2	Pir Thnu	ពីរធ្នូ		Commune (ឃុំ Khum)	100502	9
3	Snuol	ស្នួល		Commune (ឃុំ Khum)	100503	11
4	Srae Char	ស្រែចារ		Commune (ឃុំ Khum)	100504	15
5	Svay Chreah	ស្វាយជ្រះ		Commune (ឃុំ Khum)	100505	13
6	Kronhoung Saen Chey	គ្រញូងសែនជ័យ		Commune (ឃុំ Khum)	100506	11

=== Chetr Borei District ===
Chetr Borei contains 10 Communes (ឃុំ Khum) and 69 Villages (ភូមិ Phum).

#	Name	Khmer	UNGEGN	Administrative Unit	Geocode	# of Villages
1	Bos Leav	បុសលាវ		Commune (ឃុំ Khum)	100601	9
2	Changkrang	ចង្ក្រង់		Commune (ឃុំ Khum)	100602	5
3	Dar	ដារ		Commune (ឃុំ Khum)	100603	10
4	Kantuot	កន្ទួត		Commune (ឃុំ Khum)	100604	6
5	Kou Loab	គោលាប់		Commune (ឃុំ Khum)	100605	5
6	Kaoh Chraeng	កោះច្រែង		Commune (ឃុំ Khum)	100606	5
7	Sambok	សំបុក		Commune (ឃុំ Khum)	100607	8
8	Thma Andaeuk	ថ្មអណ្ដើក		Commune (ឃុំ Khum)	100608	6
9	Thma Kreae	ថ្មគ្រែ		Commune (ឃុំ Khum)	100609	3
10	Thmei	ថ្មី		Commune (ឃុំ Khum)	100610	12

=== Ou Krieng Saenchey District ===
Ou Krieng Saenchey contains 5 Communes (ឃុំ Khum) and 25 Villages (ភូមិ Phum).

#	Name	Khmer	UNGEGN	Administrative Unit	Geocode	# of Villages
1	Kbal Damrei	ក្បាលដំរី		Commune (ឃុំ Khum)	100701	5
2	Ou Krieng	អូរគ្រៀង		Commune (ឃុំ Khum)	100702	5
3	Oukondear Senchey	អូរកណ្តៀរសែនជ័យ		Commune (ឃុំ Khum)	100703	3
4	Roluos Mean Chey	រលួសមានជ័យ		Commune (ឃុំ Khum)	100704	6
5	Srae Chis	ស្រែជិះ		Commune (ឃុំ Khum)	100705	6

== Mondulkiri Province ==
Mondulkiri contains 17 Communes (ឃុំ Khum), 4 Quarters (សង្កាត់ Sangkat) and 92 Villages (ភូមិ Phum).

=== Kaev Seima District ===
Kaev Seima contains 5 Communes (ឃុំ Khum) and 27 Villages (ភូមិ Phum).

#	Name	Khmer	UNGEGN	Administrative Unit	Geocode	# of Villages
1	Chong Phlah	ចុងផ្លាស់		Commune (ឃុំ Khum)	110101	3
2	Memang	មេម៉ង់		Commune (ឃុំ Khum)	110102	5
3	Srae Chhuk	ស្រែឈូក		Commune (ឃុំ Khum)	110103	6
4	Srae Khtum	ស្រែខ្ទុម		Commune (ឃុំ Khum)	110104	8
5	Srae Preah	ស្រែព្រះ		Commune (ឃុំ Khum)	110105	5

=== Kaoh Nheaek District ===
Kaoh Nheaek contains 6 Communes (ឃុំ Khum) and 26 Villages (ភូមិ Phum).

#	Name	Khmer	UNGEGN	Administrative Unit	Geocode	# of Villages
1	Nang Khi Lik	ណងឃីលិក		Commune (ឃុំ Khum)	110201	4
2	A Buon Leu	អ បួនលើ		Commune (ឃុំ Khum)	110202	3
3	Roya	រយ៉		Commune (ឃុំ Khum)	110203	4
4	Sokh Sant	សុខសាន្ដ		Commune (ឃុំ Khum)	110204	4
5	Srae Huy	ស្រែហ៊ុយ		Commune (ឃុំ Khum)	110205	2
6	Srae Sangkum	ស្រែសង្គម		Commune (ឃុំ Khum)	110206	9

=== Ou Reang District ===
Ou Reang contains 2 Communes (ឃុំ Khum) and 7 Villages (ភូមិ Phum).

#	Name	Khmer	UNGEGN	Administrative Unit	Geocode	# of Villages
1	Dak Dam	ដាក់ដាំ		Commune (ឃុំ Khum)	110301	3
2	Saen Monourom	សែនមនោរម្យ		Commune (ឃុំ Khum)	110302	4

=== Pech Chreada District ===
Pech Chreada contains 4 Communes (ឃុំ Khum) and 18 Villages (ភូមិ Phum).

#	Name	Khmer	UNGEGN	Administrative Unit	Geocode	# of Villages
1	Krang Teh	ក្រង់តេះ		Commune (ឃុំ Khum)	110401	4
2	Pu Chrey	ពូជ្រៃ		Commune (ឃុំ Khum)	110402	4
3	Srae Ampum	ស្រែអំពូម		Commune (ឃុំ Khum)	110403	3
4	Bu Sra	ប៊ូស្រា		Commune (ឃុំ Khum)	110404	7

=== Saen Monourom Municipality ===
Saen Monourom contains 4 Quarters (សង្កាត់ Sangkat) and 14 Villages (ភូមិ Phum).

#	Name	Khmer	UNGEGN	Administrative Unit	Geocode	# of Villages
1	Monourom	មនោរម្យ		Quarter (សង្កាត់ Sangkat)	110501	2
2	Sokh Dom	សុខដុម		Quarter (សង្កាត់ Sangkat)	110502	4
3	Spean Mean Chey	ស្ពានមានជ័យ		Quarter (សង្កាត់ Sangkat)	110503	4
4	Romonea	រមនា		Quarter (សង្កាត់ Sangkat)	110504	4

== Phnom Penh Capital ==
Phnom Penh contains 105 Quarters (សង្កាត់ Sangkat) and 953 Villages (ភូមិ Phum).

=== Chamkar Mon Section ===
Chamkar Mon contains 5 Quarters (សង្កាត់ Sangkat) and 40 Villages (ភូមិ Phum).

#	Name	Khmer	UNGEGN	Administrative Unit	Geocode	# of Villages
1	Tonle Basak	ទន្លេបាសាក់		Quarter (សង្កាត់ Sangkat)	120101	16
2	Tuol Tumpung Ti Pir	ទួលទំពូងទី ២		Quarter (សង្កាត់ Sangkat)	120109	4
3	Tuol Tumpung Ti Muoy	ទួលទំពូងទី ១		Quarter (សង្កាត់ Sangkat)	120110	5
4	Boeng Trabaek	បឹងត្របែក		Quarter (សង្កាត់ Sangkat)	120111	8
5	Phsar Daeum Thkov	ផ្សារដើមថ្កូវ		Quarter (សង្កាត់ Sangkat)	120112	7

=== Doun Penh Section ===
Doun Penh contains 11 Quarters (សង្កាត់ Sangkat) and 134 Villages (ភូមិ Phum).

#	Name	Khmer	UNGEGN	Administrative Unit	Geocode	# of Villages
1	Phsar Thmei Ti Muoy	ផ្សារថ្មីទី ១		Quarter (សង្កាត់ Sangkat)	120201	11
2	Phsar Thmei Ti Pir	ផ្សារថ្មីទី ២		Quarter (សង្កាត់ Sangkat)	120202	9
3	Phsar Thmei Ti Bei	ផ្សារថ្មីទី ៣		Quarter (សង្កាត់ Sangkat)	120203	14
4	Boeng Reang	បឹងរាំង		Quarter (សង្កាត់ Sangkat)	120204	10
5	Phsar Kandal Ti Muoy	ផ្សារកណ្ដាលទី១		Quarter (សង្កាត់ Sangkat)	120205	16
6	Phsar Kandal Ti Pir	ផ្សារកណ្ដាលទី២		Quarter (សង្កាត់ Sangkat)	120206	11
7	Chakto Mukh	ចតុមុខ		Quarter (សង្កាត់ Sangkat)	120207	8
8	Chey Chummeah	ជ័យជំនះ		Quarter (សង្កាត់ Sangkat)	120208	11
9	Phsar Chas	ផ្សារចាស់		Quarter (សង្កាត់ Sangkat)	120209	10
10	Srah Chak	ស្រះចក		Quarter (សង្កាត់ Sangkat)	120210	24
11	Voat Phnum	វត្ដភ្នំ		Quarter (សង្កាត់ Sangkat)	120211	10

=== Prampir Meakkakra Section ===
Prampir Meakkakra contains 8 Quarters (សង្កាត់ Sangkat) and 66 Villages (ភូមិ Phum).

#	Name	Khmer	UNGEGN	Administrative Unit	Geocode	# of Villages
1	Ou Ruessei Ti Muoy	អូរឫស្សីទី ១		Quarter (សង្កាត់ Sangkat)	120301	6
2	Ou Ruessei Ti Pir	អូរឫស្សីទី ២		Quarter (សង្កាត់ Sangkat)	120302	9
3	Ou Ruessei Ti Bei	អូរឫស្សីទី ៣		Quarter (សង្កាត់ Sangkat)	120303	6
4	Ou Ruessei Ti Buon	អូរឫស្សីទី ៤		Quarter (សង្កាត់ Sangkat)	120304	8
5	Monourom	មនោរម្យ		Quarter (សង្កាត់ Sangkat)	120305	9
6	Mittapheap	មិត្ដភាព		Quarter (សង្កាត់ Sangkat)	120306	10
7	Veal Vong	វាលវង់		Quarter (សង្កាត់ Sangkat)	120307	12
8	Boeng Proluet	បឹងព្រលឹត		Quarter (សង្កាត់ Sangkat)	120308	6

=== Tuol Kouk Section ===
Tuol Kouk contains 10 Quarters (សង្កាត់ Sangkat) and 143 Villages (ភូមិ Phum).

#	Name	Khmer	UNGEGN	Administrative Unit	Geocode	# of Villages
1	Phsar Depou Ti Muoy	ផ្សារដេប៉ូទី ១		Quarter (សង្កាត់ Sangkat)	120401	10
2	Phsar Depou Ti Pir	ផ្សារដេប៉ូទី ២		Quarter (សង្កាត់ Sangkat)	120402	11
3	Phsar Depou Ti Bei	ផ្សារដេប៉ូទី ៣		Quarter (សង្កាត់ Sangkat)	120403	10
4	Tuek L'ak Ti Muoy	ទឹកល្អក់ទី ១		Quarter (សង្កាត់ Sangkat)	120404	16
5	Tuek L'ak Ti Pir	ទឹកល្អក់ទី ២		Quarter (សង្កាត់ Sangkat)	120405	13
6	Tuek L'ak Ti Bei	ទឹកល្អក់ទី ៣		Quarter (សង្កាត់ Sangkat)	120406	13
7	Boeng Kak Ti Muoy	បឹងកក់ទី ១		Quarter (សង្កាត់ Sangkat)	120407	14
8	Boeng Kak Ti Pir	បឹងកក់ទី ២		Quarter (សង្កាត់ Sangkat)	120408	23
9	Phsar Daeum Kor	ផ្សារដើមគរ		Quarter (សង្កាត់ Sangkat)	120409	16
10	Boeng Salang	បឹងសាឡាង		Quarter (សង្កាត់ Sangkat)	120410	17

=== Dangkao Section ===
Dangkao contains 12 Quarters (សង្កាត់ Sangkat) and 81 Villages (ភូមិ Phum).

#	Name	Khmer	UNGEGN	Administrative Unit	Geocode	# of Villages
1	Dangkao	ដង្កោ		Quarter (សង្កាត់ Sangkat)	120501	6
2	Pong Tuek	ពងទឹក		Quarter (សង្កាត់ Sangkat)	120507	10
3	Prey Veaeng	ព្រៃវែង		Quarter (សង្កាត់ Sangkat)	120508	9
4	Prey Sa	ព្រៃស		Quarter (សង្កាត់ Sangkat)	120510	12
5	Krang Pongro	ក្រាំងពង្រ		Quarter (សង្កាត់ Sangkat)	120512	4
6	Sak Sampov	សាក់សំពៅ		Quarter (សង្កាត់ Sangkat)	120514	7
7	Cheung Aek	ជើងឯក		Quarter (សង្កាត់ Sangkat)	120515	6
8	Kong Noy	គងនយ		Quarter (សង្កាត់ Sangkat)	120516	4
9	Preaek Kampues	ព្រែកកំពឹស		Quarter (សង្កាត់ Sangkat)	120517	6
10	Roluos	រលួស		Quarter (សង្កាត់ Sangkat)	120518	3
11	Spean Thma	ស្ពានថ្ម		Quarter (សង្កាត់ Sangkat)	120519	8
12	Tien	ទៀន		Quarter (សង្កាត់ Sangkat)	120520	6

=== Mean Chey Section ===
Mean Chey contains 7 Quarters (សង្កាត់ Sangkat) and 59 Villages (ភូមិ Phum).

#	Name	Khmer	UNGEGN	Administrative Unit	Geocode	# of Villages
1	Chak Angrae Leu	ចាក់អង្រែលើ		Quarter (សង្កាត់ Sangkat)	120606	7
2	Chak Angrae Kraom	ចាក់អង្រែក្រោម		Quarter (សង្កាត់ Sangkat)	120607	8
3	Stueng Mean chey 1	ស្ទឹងមានជ័យទី១		Quarter (សង្កាត់ Sangkat)	120608	8
4	Stueng Mean chey 2	ស្ទឹងមានជ័យទី២		Quarter (សង្កាត់ Sangkat)	120609	8
5	Stueng Mean chey 3	ស្ទឹងមានជ័យទី៣		Quarter (សង្កាត់ Sangkat)	120610	6
6	Boeng Tumpun 1	បឹងទំពុនទី១		Quarter (សង្កាត់ Sangkat)	120611	11
7	Boeng Tumpun 2	បឹងទំពុនទី២		Quarter (សង្កាត់ Sangkat)	120612	11

=== Russey Keo Section ===
Russey Keo contains 7 Quarters (សង្កាត់ Sangkat) and 30 Villages (ភូមិ Phum).

#	Name	Khmer	UNGEGN	Administrative Unit	Geocode	# of Villages
1	Svay Pak	ស្វាយប៉ាក		Quarter (សង្កាត់ Sangkat)	120703	3
2	Kilomaetr Lekh Prammuoy	គីឡូម៉ែត្រលេខ៦		Quarter (សង្កាត់ Sangkat)	120704	3
3	Ruessei Kaev	ឫស្សីកែវ		Quarter (សង្កាត់ Sangkat)	120706	4
4	Chrang Chamreh Ti Muoy	ច្រាំងចំរេះទី ១		Quarter (សង្កាត់ Sangkat)	120711	4
5	Chrang Chamreh Ti Pir	ច្រាំងចំរេះទី ២		Quarter (សង្កាត់ Sangkat)	120712	4
6	Tuol Sangkae 1	ទួលសង្កែទី១		Quarter (សង្កាត់ Sangkat)	120713	6
7	Tuol Sangkae 2	ទួលសង្កែទី២		Quarter (សង្កាត់ Sangkat)	120714	6

=== Sen Sok Section ===
Sen Sok contains 6 Quarters (សង្កាត់ Sangkat) and 47 Villages (ភូមិ Phum).

#	Name	Khmer	UNGEGN	Administrative Unit	Geocode	# of Villages
1	Phnom Penh Thmei	ភ្នំពេញថ្មី		Quarter (សង្កាត់ Sangkat)	120801	6
2	Tuek Thla	ទឹកថ្លា		Quarter (សង្កាត់ Sangkat)	120802	7
3	Khmuonh	ឃ្មួញ		Quarter (សង្កាត់ Sangkat)	120803	13
4	Krang Thnong	ក្រាំងធ្នង់		Quarter (សង្កាត់ Sangkat)	120807	8
5	Ou Baek K'am	អូរបែកក្អម		Quarter (សង្កាត់ Sangkat)	120808	5
6	Kouk Khleang	គោកឃ្លាង		Quarter (សង្កាត់ Sangkat)	120809	8

=== Pur SenChey Section ===
Pur SenChey contains 7 Quarters (សង្កាត់ Sangkat) and 75 Villages (ភូមិ Phum).

#	Name	Khmer	UNGEGN	Administrative Unit	Geocode	# of Villages
1	Trapeang Krasang	ត្រពាំងក្រសាំង		Quarter (សង្កាត់ Sangkat)	120901	13
2	Samraong Kraom	សំរោងក្រោម		Quarter (សង្កាត់ Sangkat)	120906	11
3	Chaom Chau 1	ចោមចៅទី១		Quarter (សង្កាត់ Sangkat)	120914	8
4	Chaom Chau 2	ចោមចៅទី២		Quarter (សង្កាត់ Sangkat)	120915	16
5	Chaom Chau 3	ចោមចៅទី៣		Quarter (សង្កាត់ Sangkat)	120916	14
6	Kakab 1	កាកាបទី១		Quarter (សង្កាត់ Sangkat)	120917	8
7	Kakab 2	កាកាបទី២		Quarter (សង្កាត់ Sangkat)	120918	5

=== Chrouy Changvar Section ===
Chrouy Changvar contains 5 Quarters (សង្កាត់ Sangkat) and 22 Villages (ភូមិ Phum).

#	Name	Khmer	UNGEGN	Administrative Unit	Geocode	# of Villages
1	Chrouy Changvar	ជ្រោយចង្វារ		Quarter (សង្កាត់ Sangkat)	121001	5
2	Preaek Lieb	ព្រែកលៀប		Quarter (សង្កាត់ Sangkat)	121002	4
3	Preaek Ta Sek	ព្រែកតាសេក		Quarter (សង្កាត់ Sangkat)	121003	5
4	Kaoh Dach	កោះដាច់		Quarter (សង្កាត់ Sangkat)	121004	5
5	Bak Kaeng	បាក់ខែង		Quarter (សង្កាត់ Sangkat)	121005	3

=== Praek Pnov Section ===
Praek Pnov contains 5 Quarters (សង្កាត់ Sangkat) and 59 Villages (ភូមិ Phum).

#	Name	Khmer	UNGEGN	Administrative Unit	Geocode	# of Villages
1	Preaek Phnov	ព្រែកព្នៅ		Quarter (សង្កាត់ Sangkat)	121101	5
2	Ponhea Pon	ពញាពន់		Quarter (សង្កាត់ Sangkat)	121102	8
3	Samraong	សំរោង		Quarter (សង្កាត់ Sangkat)	121103	4
4	Kouk Roka	គោករកា		Quarter (សង្កាត់ Sangkat)	121104	18
5	Ponsang	ពន្សាំង		Quarter (សង្កាត់ Sangkat)	121105	24

=== Chbar Ampov Section ===
Chbar Ampov contains 8 Quarters (សង្កាត់ Sangkat) and 49 Villages (ភូមិ Phum).

#	Name	Khmer	UNGEGN	Administrative Unit	Geocode	# of Villages
1	Chhbar Ampov Ti Muoy	ច្បារអំពៅទី ១		Quarter (សង្កាត់ Sangkat)	121201	3
2	Chbar Ampov Ti Pir	ច្បារអំពៅទី ២		Quarter (សង្កាត់ Sangkat)	121202	6
3	Nirouth	និរោធ		Quarter (សង្កាត់ Sangkat)	121203	6
4	Preaek Pra	ព្រែកប្រា		Quarter (សង្កាត់ Sangkat)	121204	6
5	Veal Sbov	វាលស្បូវ		Quarter (សង្កាត់ Sangkat)	121205	5
6	Preaek Aeng	ព្រែកឯង		Quarter (សង្កាត់ Sangkat)	121206	9
7	Kbal Kaoh	ក្បាលកោះ		Quarter (សង្កាត់ Sangkat)	121207	8
8	Preaek Thmei	ព្រែកថ្មី		Quarter (សង្កាត់ Sangkat)	121208	6

=== Boeng Keng Kang Section ===
Boeng Keng Kang contains 7 Quarters (សង្កាត់ Sangkat) and 55 Villages (ភូមិ Phum).

#	Name	Khmer	UNGEGN	Administrative Unit	Geocode	# of Villages
1	Boeng Keng Kang Ti Muoy	បឹងកេងកងទី ១		Quarter (សង្កាត់ Sangkat)	121301	9
2	Boeng Keng Kang Ti Pir	បឹងកេងកងទី ២		Quarter (សង្កាត់ Sangkat)	121302	9
3	Boeng Keng Kang Ti Bei	បឹងកេងកងទី ៣		Quarter (សង្កាត់ Sangkat)	121303	9
4	Olympic	អូឡាំពិក		Quarter (សង្កាត់ Sangkat)	121304	5
5	Tumnob Tuek	ទំនប់ទឹក		Quarter (សង្កាត់ Sangkat)	121305	5
6	Tuol Svay Prey Ti Muoy	ទួលស្វាយព្រៃទី ១		Quarter (សង្កាត់ Sangkat)	121306	7
7	Tuol Svay Prey Ti Pir	ទួលស្វាយព្រៃទី ២		Quarter (សង្កាត់ Sangkat)	121307	11

=== Kamboul Section ===
Kamboul contains 7 Quarters (សង្កាត់ Sangkat) and 93 Villages (ភូមិ Phum).

#	Name	Khmer	UNGEGN	Administrative Unit	Geocode	# of Villages
1	Kamboul	កំបូល		Quarter (សង្កាត់ Sangkat)	121401	18
2	Kantaok	កន្ទោក		Quarter (សង្កាត់ Sangkat)	121402	13
3	Ovlaok	ឪឡោក		Quarter (សង្កាត់ Sangkat)	121403	14
4	Snaor	ស្នោរ		Quarter (សង្កាត់ Sangkat)	121404	18
5	Phleung Chheh Roteh	ភ្លើងឆេះរទេះ		Quarter (សង្កាត់ Sangkat)	121405	8
6	Boeng Thum	បឹងធំ		Quarter (សង្កាត់ Sangkat)	121406	16
7	Prateah Lang	ប្រទះឡាង		Quarter (សង្កាត់ Sangkat)	121407	6

== Preah Vihear Province ==
Preah Vihear contains 49 Communes (ឃុំ Khum), 2 Quarters (សង្កាត់ Sangkat) and 232 Villages (ភូមិ Phum).

=== Chey Saen District ===
Chey Saen contains 6 Communes (ឃុំ Khum) and 21 Villages (ភូមិ Phum).

#	Name	Khmer	UNGEGN	Administrative Unit	Geocode	# of Villages
1	S'ang	ស្អាង		Commune (ឃុំ Khum)	130101	3
2	Tasu	តស៊ូ		Commune (ឃុំ Khum)	130102	3
3	Khyang	ខ្យង		Commune (ឃុំ Khum)	130103	3
4	Chrach	ច្រាច់		Commune (ឃុំ Khum)	130104	6
5	Thmea	ធ្មា		Commune (ឃុំ Khum)	130105	3
6	Putrea	ពុទ្រា		Commune (ឃុំ Khum)	130106	3

=== Chhaeb District ===
Chhaeb contains 8 Communes (ឃុំ Khum) and 26 Villages (ភូមិ Phum).

#	Name	Khmer	UNGEGN	Administrative Unit	Geocode	# of Villages
1	Chhaeb Muoy	ឆែបមួយ		Commune (ឃុំ Khum)	130201	3
2	Chhaeb Pir	ឆែបពីរ		Commune (ឃុំ Khum)	130202	4
3	Sangkae Muoy	សង្កែមួយ		Commune (ឃុំ Khum)	130203	2
4	Sangkae Pir	សង្កែពីរ		Commune (ឃុំ Khum)	130204	3
5	Mlu Prey Muoy	ម្លូព្រៃមួយ		Commune (ឃុំ Khum)	130205	3
6	Mlu Prey Pir	ម្លូព្រៃពីរ		Commune (ឃុំ Khum)	130206	2
7	Kampong Sralau Muoy	កំពង់ស្រឡៅមួយ		Commune (ឃុំ Khum)	130207	5
8	Kampong Sralau Pir	កំពង់ស្រឡៅពីរ		Commune (ឃុំ Khum)	130208	4

=== Choam Ksant District ===
Choam Ksant contains 8 Communes (ឃុំ Khum) and 49 Villages (ភូមិ Phum).

#	Name	Khmer	UNGEGN	Administrative Unit	Geocode	# of Villages
1	Choam Ksant	ជាំក្សាន្ដ		Commune (ឃុំ Khum)	130301	7
2	Tuek Kraham	ទឹកក្រហម		Commune (ឃុំ Khum)	130302	7
3	Pring Thum	ព្រីងធំ		Commune (ឃុំ Khum)	130303	2
4	Rumdaoh Srae	រំដោះស្រែ		Commune (ឃុំ Khum)	130304	7
5	Yeang	យាង		Commune (ឃុំ Khum)	130305	6
6	Kantuot	កន្ទួត		Commune (ឃុំ Khum)	130306	7
7	Sror Aem	ស្រអែម		Commune (ឃុំ Khum)	130307	7
8	Morokot	មរកត		Commune (ឃុំ Khum)	130308	6

=== Kuleaen District ===
Kuleaen contains 6 Communes (ឃុំ Khum) and 23 Villages (ភូមិ Phum).

#	Name	Khmer	UNGEGN	Administrative Unit	Geocode	# of Villages
1	Kuleaen Tboung	គូលែនត្បូង		Commune (ឃុំ Khum)	130401	2
2	Kuleaen Cheung	គូលែនជើង		Commune (ឃុំ Khum)	130402	2
3	Thmei	ថ្មី		Commune (ឃុំ Khum)	130403	5
4	Phnum Penh	ភ្នំពេញ		Commune (ឃុំ Khum)	130404	3
5	Phnum Tbaeng Pir	ភ្នំត្បែងពីរ		Commune (ឃុំ Khum)	130405	4
6	Srayang	ស្រយង់		Commune (ឃុំ Khum)	130406	7

=== Rovieng District ===
Rovieng contains 12 Communes (ឃុំ Khum) and 57 Villages (ភូមិ Phum).

#	Name	Khmer	UNGEGN	Administrative Unit	Geocode	# of Villages
1	Robieb	របៀប		Commune (ឃុំ Khum)	130501	6
2	Reaksmei	រស្មី		Commune (ឃុំ Khum)	130502	4
3	Rohas	រហ័ស		Commune (ឃុំ Khum)	130503	6
4	Rung Roeang	រុងរឿង		Commune (ឃុំ Khum)	130504	4
5	Rik Reay	រីករាយ		Commune (ឃុំ Khum)	130505	3
6	Ruos Roan	រួសរាន់		Commune (ឃុំ Khum)	130506	3
7	Rotanak	រតនៈ		Commune (ឃុំ Khum)	130507	5
8	Rieb Roy	រៀបរយ		Commune (ឃុំ Khum)	130508	3
9	Reaksa	រក្សា		Commune (ឃុំ Khum)	130509	8
10	Rumdaoh	រំដោះ		Commune (ឃុំ Khum)	130510	4
11	Romtum	រមទម		Commune (ឃុំ Khum)	130511	6
12	Romoneiy	រមណីយ		Commune (ឃុំ Khum)	130512	5

=== Sangkum Thmei District ===
Sangkum Thmei contains 5 Communes (ឃុំ Khum) and 24 Villages (ភូមិ Phum).

#	Name	Khmer	UNGEGN	Administrative Unit	Geocode	# of Villages
1	Chamraeun	ចំរើន		Commune (ឃុំ Khum)	130601	5
2	Ro'ang	រអាង		Commune (ឃុំ Khum)	130602	6
3	Phnum Tbaeng Muoy	ភ្នំត្បែងមួយ		Commune (ឃុំ Khum)	130603	2
4	Sdau	ស្ដៅ		Commune (ឃុំ Khum)	130604	5
5	Ronak Ser	រណសិរ្ស		Commune (ឃុំ Khum)	130605	6

=== Tbaeng Mean Chey District ===
Tbaeng Mean Chey contains 4 Communes (ឃុំ Khum) and 12 Villages (ភូមិ Phum).

#	Name	Khmer	UNGEGN	Administrative Unit	Geocode	# of Villages
1	Chhean Mukh	ឈានមុខ		Commune (ឃុំ Khum)	130703	3
2	Pou	ពោធិ៍		Commune (ឃុំ Khum)	130704	4
3	Prame	ប្រមេរុ		Commune (ឃុំ Khum)	130705	3
4	Preah Khleang	ព្រះឃ្លាំង		Commune (ឃុំ Khum)	130706	2

=== Preah Vihear Municipality ===
Preah Vihear contains 2 Quarters (សង្កាត់ Sangkat) and 20 Villages (ភូមិ Phum).

#	Name	Khmer	UNGEGN	Administrative Unit	Geocode	# of Villages
1	Kampong Pranak	កំពង់ប្រណាក		Quarter (សង្កាត់ Sangkat)	130801	10
2	Pal Hal	ប៉ាលហាល		Quarter (សង្កាត់ Sangkat)	130802	10

== Prey Veng Province ==
Prey Veng contains 112 Communes (ឃុំ Khum), 4 Quarters (សង្កាត់ Sangkat) and 1,168 Villages (ភូមិ Phum).

=== Ba Phnum District ===
Ba Phnum contains 9 Communes (ឃុំ Khum) and 108 Villages (ភូមិ Phum).

#	Name	Khmer	UNGEGN	Administrative Unit	Geocode	# of Villages
1	Boeng Preah	បឹងព្រះ		Commune (ឃុំ Khum)	140101	14
2	Cheung Phnum	ជើងភ្នំ		Commune (ឃុំ Khum)	140102	7
3	Chheu Kach	ឈើកាច់		Commune (ឃុំ Khum)	140103	14
4	Reaks Chey	រក្សជ័យ		Commune (ឃុំ Khum)	140104	12
5	Roung Damrei	រោងដំរី		Commune (ឃុំ Khum)	140105	12
6	Sdau Kaong	ស្ដៅកោង		Commune (ឃុំ Khum)	140106	15
7	Spueu Ka	ស្ពឺ ក		Commune (ឃុំ Khum)	140107	10
8	Spueu Kha	ស្ពឺ ខ		Commune (ឃុំ Khum)	140108	6
9	Theay	ធាយ		Commune (ឃុំ Khum)	140109	18

=== Kamchay Mear District ===
Kamchay Mear contains 8 Communes (ឃុំ Khum) and 129 Villages (ភូមិ Phum).

#	Name	Khmer	UNGEGN	Administrative Unit	Geocode	# of Villages
1	Cheach	ជាច		Commune (ឃុំ Khum)	140201	26
2	Doun Koeng	ដូនកឹង		Commune (ឃុំ Khum)	140202	10
3	Kranhung	ក្រញូង		Commune (ឃុំ Khum)	140203	19
4	Krabau	ក្របៅ		Commune (ឃុំ Khum)	140204	11
5	Seang Khveang	ស៊ាងឃ្វាង		Commune (ឃុំ Khum)	140205	13
6	Smaong Khang Cheung	ស្មោងខាងជើង		Commune (ឃុំ Khum)	140206	17
7	Smaong Khang Tboung	ស្មោងខាងត្បូង		Commune (ឃុំ Khum)	140207	20
8	Trabaek	ត្របែក		Commune (ឃុំ Khum)	140208	13

=== Kampong Trabaek District ===
Kampong Trabaek contains 13 Communes (ឃុំ Khum) and 122 Villages (ភូមិ Phum).

#	Name	Khmer	UNGEGN	Administrative Unit	Geocode	# of Villages
1	Ansaong	អន្សោង		Commune (ឃុំ Khum)	140301	8
2	Cham	ចាម		Commune (ឃុំ Khum)	140302	10
3	Cheang Daek	ជាងដែក		Commune (ឃុំ Khum)	140303	12
4	Chrey	ជ្រៃ		Commune (ឃុំ Khum)	140304	9
5	Kansoam Ak	កន្សោមអក		Commune (ឃុំ Khum)	140305	9
6	Kou Khchak	គោខ្ចក		Commune (ឃុំ Khum)	140306	12
7	Kampong Trabaek	កំពង់ត្របែក		Commune (ឃុំ Khum)	140307	10
8	Peam Montear	ពាមមន្ទារ		Commune (ឃុំ Khum)	140308	11
9	Prasat	ប្រាសាទ		Commune (ឃុំ Khum)	140309	9
10	Pratheat	ប្រធាតុ		Commune (ឃុំ Khum)	140310	9
11	Prey Chhor	ព្រៃឈរ		Commune (ឃុំ Khum)	140311	8
12	Prey Poun	ព្រៃពោន		Commune (ឃុំ Khum)	140312	8
13	Thkov	ថ្កូវ		Commune (ឃុំ Khum)	140313	7

=== Kanhchriech District ===
Kanhchriech contains 8 Communes (ឃុំ Khum) and 99 Villages (ភូមិ Phum).

#	Name	Khmer	UNGEGN	Administrative Unit	Geocode	# of Villages
1	Chong Ampil	ចុងអំពិល		Commune (ឃុំ Khum)	140401	7
2	Kanhchriech	កញ្ជ្រៀច		Commune (ឃុំ Khum)	140402	11
3	Kdoeang Reay	ក្ដឿងរាយ		Commune (ឃុំ Khum)	140403	17
4	Kouk Kong Kaeut	គោកគង់កើត		Commune (ឃុំ Khum)	140404	12
5	Kouk Kong Lech	គោកគង់លិច		Commune (ឃុំ Khum)	140405	17
6	Preal	ព្រាល		Commune (ឃុំ Khum)	140406	16
7	Thma Pun	ថ្មពូន		Commune (ឃុំ Khum)	140407	11
8	Tnaot	ត្នោត		Commune (ឃុំ Khum)	140408	8

=== Me Sang District ===
Me Sang contains 8 Communes (ឃុំ Khum) and 118 Villages (ភូមិ Phum).

#	Name	Khmer	UNGEGN	Administrative Unit	Geocode	# of Villages
1	Angkor Sar	អង្គរសរ		Commune (ឃុំ Khum)	140501	9
2	Chres	ច្រេស		Commune (ឃុំ Khum)	140502	19
3	Chi Phoch	ជីផុច		Commune (ឃុំ Khum)	140503	18
4	Prey Khnes	ព្រៃឃ្នេស		Commune (ឃុំ Khum)	140504	22
5	Prey Rumdeng	ព្រៃរំដេង		Commune (ឃុំ Khum)	140505	8
6	Prey Totueng	ព្រៃទទឹង		Commune (ឃុំ Khum)	140506	12
7	Svay Chrum	ស្វាយជ្រុំ		Commune (ឃុំ Khum)	140507	18
8	Trapeang Srae	ត្រពាំងស្រែ		Commune (ឃុំ Khum)	140508	12

=== Peam Chor District ===
Peam Chor contains 10 Communes (ឃុំ Khum) and 50 Villages (ភូមិ Phum).

#	Name	Khmer	UNGEGN	Administrative Unit	Geocode	# of Villages
1	Angkor Angk	អង្គរអង្គ		Commune (ឃុំ Khum)	140601	4
2	Kampong Prasat	កំពង់ប្រាសាទ		Commune (ឃុំ Khum)	140602	5
3	Kaoh Chek	កោះចេក		Commune (ឃុំ Khum)	140603	4
4	Kaoh Roka	កោះរកា		Commune (ឃុំ Khum)	140604	4
5	Kaoh Sampov	កោះសំពៅ		Commune (ឃុំ Khum)	140605	5
6	Krang Ta Yang	ក្រាំងតាយ៉ង		Commune (ឃុំ Khum)	140606	8
7	Preaek Krabau	ព្រែកក្របៅ		Commune (ឃុំ Khum)	140607	3
8	Preaek Sambuor	ព្រែកសំបួរ		Commune (ឃុំ Khum)	140608	3
9	Ruessei Srok	ឫស្សីស្រុក		Commune (ឃុំ Khum)	140609	11
10	Svay Phluoh	ស្វាយភ្លោះ		Commune (ឃុំ Khum)	140610	3

=== Peam Ro District ===
Peam Ro contains 8 Communes (ឃុំ Khum) and 44 Villages (ភូមិ Phum).

#	Name	Khmer	UNGEGN	Administrative Unit	Geocode	# of Villages
1	Ba Baong	បាបោង		Commune (ឃុំ Khum)	140701	5
2	Banlich Prasat	បន្លិចប្រាសាទ		Commune (ឃុំ Khum)	140702	6
3	Neak Loeang	អ្នកលឿង		Commune (ឃុំ Khum)	140703	5
4	Peam Mean Chey	ពាមមានជ័យ		Commune (ឃុំ Khum)	140704	5
5	Peam Ro	ពាមរក៍		Commune (ឃុំ Khum)	140705	5
6	Preaek Khsay Ka	ព្រែកខ្សាយ ក		Commune (ឃុំ Khum)	140706	5
7	Preaek Khsay Kha	ព្រែកខ្សាយ ខ		Commune (ឃុំ Khum)	140707	6
8	Prey Kandieng	ព្រៃកណ្ដៀង		Commune (ឃុំ Khum)	140708	7

=== Pea Reang District ===
Pea Reang contains 9 Communes (ឃុំ Khum) and 93 Villages (ភូមិ Phum).

#	Name	Khmer	UNGEGN	Administrative Unit	Geocode	# of Villages
1	Kampong Popil	កំពង់ពពិល		Commune (ឃុំ Khum)	140801	11
2	Kanhcham	កញ្ចំ		Commune (ឃុំ Khum)	140802	15
3	Kampong Prang	កំពង់ប្រាំង		Commune (ឃុំ Khum)	140803	6
4	Mesar Prachan	មេសរប្រចាន់		Commune (ឃុំ Khum)	140805	7
5	Prey Pnov	ព្រៃព្នៅ		Commune (ឃុំ Khum)	140807	16
6	Prey Sniet	ព្រៃស្នៀត		Commune (ឃុំ Khum)	140808	7
7	Prey Sralet	ព្រៃស្រឡិត		Commune (ឃុំ Khum)	140809	15
8	Reab	រាប		Commune (ឃុំ Khum)	140810	7
9	Roka	រកា		Commune (ឃុំ Khum)	140811	9

=== Preah Sdach District ===
Preah Sdach contains 11 Communes (ឃុំ Khum) and 145 Villages (ភូមិ Phum).

#	Name	Khmer	UNGEGN	Administrative Unit	Geocode	# of Villages
1	Angkor Reach	អង្គររាជ្យ		Commune (ឃុំ Khum)	140901	17
2	Banteay Chakrei	បន្ទាយចក្រី		Commune (ឃុំ Khum)	140902	20
3	Boeng Daol	បឹងដោល		Commune (ឃុំ Khum)	140903	11
4	Chey Kampok	ជៃកំពក		Commune (ឃុំ Khum)	140904	12
5	Kampong Soeng	កំពង់សឹង		Commune (ឃុំ Khum)	140905	12
6	Krang Svay	ក្រាំងស្វាយ		Commune (ឃុំ Khum)	140906	10
7	Lvea	ល្វា		Commune (ឃុំ Khum)	140907	11
8	Preah Sdach	ព្រះស្ដេច		Commune (ឃុំ Khum)	140908	13
9	Reathor	រាធរ		Commune (ឃុំ Khum)	140909	5
10	Rumchek	រំចេក		Commune (ឃុំ Khum)	140910	16
11	Sena Reach Otdam	សេនារាជឧត្ដម		Commune (ឃុំ Khum)	140911	18

=== Prey Veng Municipality ===
Prey Veng contains 4 Quarters (សង្កាត់ Sangkat) and 23 Villages (ភូមិ Phum).

#	Name	Khmer	UNGEGN	Administrative Unit	Geocode	# of Villages
1	Baray	បារាយណ៍		Quarter (សង្កាត់ Sangkat)	141001	2
2	Cheung Tuek	ជើងទឹក		Quarter (សង្កាត់ Sangkat)	141002	5
3	Kampong Leav	កំពង់លាវ		Quarter (សង្កាត់ Sangkat)	141003	8
4	Ta Kao	តាកោ		Quarter (សង្កាត់ Sangkat)	141004	8

=== Pur Rieng District ===
Pur Rieng contains 6 Communes (ឃុំ Khum) and 36 Villages (ភូមិ Phum).

#	Name	Khmer	UNGEGN	Administrative Unit	Geocode	# of Villages
1	Pou Rieng	ពោធិ៍រៀង		Commune (ឃុំ Khum)	141101	4
2	Preaek Anteah	ព្រែកអន្ទះ		Commune (ឃុំ Khum)	141102	8
3	Preaek Chrey	ព្រែកជ្រៃ		Commune (ឃុំ Khum)	141103	6
4	Prey Kanlaong	ព្រៃកន្លោង		Commune (ឃុំ Khum)	141104	5
5	Kampong Ruessei	កំពង់ឫស្សី		Commune (ឃុំ Khum)	141106	8
6	Preaek Ta Sar	ព្រែកតាសរ		Commune (ឃុំ Khum)	141107	5

=== Sithor Kandal District ===
Sithor Kandal contains 11 Communes (ឃុំ Khum) and 63 Villages (ភូមិ Phum).

#	Name	Khmer	UNGEGN	Administrative Unit	Geocode	# of Villages
1	Ampil Krau	អំពិលក្រៅ		Commune (ឃុំ Khum)	141201	5
2	Chrey Khmum	ជ្រៃឃ្មុំ		Commune (ឃុំ Khum)	141202	8
3	Lve	ល្វេ		Commune (ឃុំ Khum)	141203	6
4	Pnov Ti Muoy	ព្នៅទី ១		Commune (ឃុំ Khum)	141204	7
5	Pnov Ti Pir	ព្នៅទី ២		Commune (ឃុំ Khum)	141205	4
6	Pou Ti	ពោធិ៍ទី		Commune (ឃុំ Khum)	141206	6
7	Preaek Changkran	ព្រែកចង្ក្រាន		Commune (ឃុំ Khum)	141207	5
8	Prey Daeum Thnoeng	ព្រៃដើមថ្នឹង		Commune (ឃុំ Khum)	141208	4
9	Prey Tueng	ព្រៃទឹង		Commune (ឃុំ Khum)	141209	5
10	Rumlech	រំលេច		Commune (ឃុំ Khum)	141210	6
11	Ruessei Sanh	ឫស្សីសាញ់		Commune (ឃុំ Khum)	141211	7

=== Svay Antor District ===
Svay Antor contains 11 Communes (ឃុំ Khum) and 138 Villages (ភូមិ Phum).

#	Name	Khmer	UNGEGN	Administrative Unit	Geocode	# of Villages
1	Angkor Tret	អង្គរទ្រេត		Commune (ឃុំ Khum)	141301	13
2	Chea Khlang	ជាខ្លាង		Commune (ឃុំ Khum)	141302	8
3	Chrey	ជ្រៃ		Commune (ឃុំ Khum)	141303	16
4	Damrei Puon	ដំរីពួន		Commune (ឃុំ Khum)	141304	17
5	Me Bon	មេបុណ្យ		Commune (ឃុំ Khum)	141305	7
6	Pean Roung	ពានរោង		Commune (ឃុំ Khum)	141306	21
7	Popueus	ពពឺស		Commune (ឃុំ Khum)	141307	4
8	Prey Khla	ព្រៃខ្លា		Commune (ឃុំ Khum)	141308	13
9	Samraong	សំរោង		Commune (ឃុំ Khum)	141309	14
10	Svay Antor	ស្វាយអន្ទរ		Commune (ឃុំ Khum)	141310	7
11	Tuek Thla	ទឹកថ្លា		Commune (ឃុំ Khum)	141311	18

== Pursat Province ==
Pursat contains 42 Communes (ឃុំ Khum), 7 Quarters (សង្កាត់ Sangkat) and 526 Villages (ភូមិ Phum).

=== Bakan District ===
Bakan contains 9 Communes (ឃុំ Khum) and 132 Villages (ភូមិ Phum).

#	Name	Khmer	UNGEGN	Administrative Unit	Geocode	# of Villages
1	Boeng Bat Kandaol	បឹងបត់កណ្ដាល		Commune (ឃុំ Khum)	150101	13
2	Boeng Khnar	បឹងខ្នារ		Commune (ឃុំ Khum)	150102	13
3	Khnar Totueng	ខ្នារទទឹង		Commune (ឃុំ Khum)	150103	10
4	Me Tuek	មេទឹក		Commune (ឃុំ Khum)	150104	15
5	Ou Ta Paong	អូរតាប៉ោង		Commune (ឃុំ Khum)	150105	18
6	Rumlech	រំលេច		Commune (ឃុំ Khum)	150106	13
7	Snam Preah	ស្នាមព្រះ		Commune (ឃុំ Khum)	150107	20
8	Svay Doun Kaev	ស្វាយដូនកែវ		Commune (ឃុំ Khum)	150108	10
9	Trapeang chorng	ត្រពាំងជង		Commune (ឃុំ Khum)	150110	20

=== Kandieng District ===
Kandieng contains 9 Communes (ឃុំ Khum) and 112 Villages (ភូមិ Phum).

#	Name	Khmer	UNGEGN	Administrative Unit	Geocode	# of Villages
1	Anlong Vil	អន្លង់វិល		Commune (ឃុំ Khum)	150201	16
2	Kandieng	កណ្ដៀង		Commune (ឃុំ Khum)	150203	17
3	Kanhchor	កញ្ជរ		Commune (ឃុំ Khum)	150204	14
4	Reang Til	រាំងទិល		Commune (ឃុំ Khum)	150205	5
5	Srae Sdok	ស្រែស្ដុក		Commune (ឃុំ Khum)	150206	17
6	Svay Luong	ស្វាយលួង		Commune (ឃុំ Khum)	150207	13
7	Sya	ស្យា		Commune (ឃុំ Khum)	150208	11
8	Veal	វាល		Commune (ឃុំ Khum)	150209	9
9	Kaoh Chum	កោះជុំ		Commune (ឃុំ Khum)	150210	10

=== Krakor District ===
Krakor contains 11 Communes (ឃុំ Khum) and 107 Villages (ភូមិ Phum).

#	Name	Khmer	UNGEGN	Administrative Unit	Geocode	# of Villages
1	Anlong Tnaot	អន្លង់ត្នោត		Commune (ឃុំ Khum)	150301	12
2	Ansa Chambak	អន្សាចំបក់		Commune (ឃុំ Khum)	150302	7
3	Boeng Kantuot	បឹងកន្ទួត		Commune (ឃុំ Khum)	150303	11
4	Chheu Tom	ឈើតុំ		Commune (ឃុំ Khum)	150304	13
5	Kampong Luong	កំពង់លួង		Commune (ឃុំ Khum)	150305	5
6	Kampong Pou	កំពង់ពោធិ៍		Commune (ឃុំ Khum)	150306	8
7	Kbal Trach	ក្បាលត្រាច		Commune (ឃុំ Khum)	150307	12
8	Ou Sandan	អូរសណ្ដាន់		Commune (ឃុំ Khum)	150308	8
9	Sna Ansa	ស្នាអន្សា		Commune (ឃុំ Khum)	150309	10
10	Svay Sa	ស្វាយស		Commune (ឃុំ Khum)	150310	6
11	Tnaot Chum	ត្នោតជុំ		Commune (ឃុំ Khum)	150311	15

=== Phnum Kravanh District ===
Phnum Kravanh contains 6 Communes (ឃុំ Khum) and 47 Villages (ភូមិ Phum).

#	Name	Khmer	UNGEGN	Administrative Unit	Geocode	# of Villages
1	Bak Chenhchien	បាក់ចិញ្ចៀន		Commune (ឃុំ Khum)	150401	9
2	Leach	លាច		Commune (ឃុំ Khum)	150402	8
3	Prongil	ព្រងិល		Commune (ឃុំ Khum)	150404	9
4	Rokat	រកាត		Commune (ឃុំ Khum)	150405	4
5	Santreae	សន្ទ្រែ		Commune (ឃុំ Khum)	150406	4
6	Samraong	សំរោង		Commune (ឃុំ Khum)	150407	13

=== Pursat Municipality ===
Pursat contains 7 Quarters (សង្កាត់ Sangkat) and 73 Villages (ភូមិ Phum).

#	Name	Khmer	UNGEGN	Administrative Unit	Geocode	# of Villages
1	Chamraeun Phal	ចំរើនផល		Quarter (សង្កាត់ Sangkat)	150501	9
2	Lolok Sa	លលកស		Quarter (សង្កាត់ Sangkat)	150503	10
3	Phteah Prey	ផ្ទះព្រៃ		Quarter (សង្កាត់ Sangkat)	150504	13
4	Prey Nhi	ព្រៃញី		Quarter (សង្កាត់ Sangkat)	150505	8
5	Roleab	រលាប		Quarter (សង្កាត់ Sangkat)	150506	16
6	Svay At	ស្វាយអាត់		Quarter (សង្កាត់ Sangkat)	150507	5
7	Banteay Dei	បន្ទាយដី		Quarter (សង្កាត់ Sangkat)	150508	12

=== Veal Veaeng District ===
Veal Veaeng contains 5 Communes (ឃុំ Khum) and 20 Villages (ភូមិ Phum).

#	Name	Khmer	UNGEGN	Administrative Unit	Geocode	# of Villages
1	Ou Saom	អូរសោម		Commune (ឃុំ Khum)	150601	4
2	Krapeu Pir	ក្រពើពីរ		Commune (ឃុំ Khum)	150602	3
3	Anlong Reab	អន្លង់រាប		Commune (ឃុំ Khum)	150603	5
4	Pramaoy	ប្រម៉ោយ		Commune (ឃុំ Khum)	150604	5
5	Thma Da	ថ្មដា		Commune (ឃុំ Khum)	150605	3

=== Ta Lou Senchey District ===
Ta Lou Senchey contains 2 Communes (ឃុំ Khum) and 35 Villages (ភូមិ Phum).

#	Name	Khmer	UNGEGN	Administrative Unit	Geocode	# of Villages
1	Ta Lou	តាលោ		Commune (ឃុំ Khum)	150701	22
2	Phteah Rung	ផ្ទះរុង		Commune (ឃុំ Khum)	150702	13

== Ratanakiri Province ==
Ratanakiri contains 46 Communes (ឃុំ Khum), 4 Quarters (សង្កាត់ Sangkat) and 243 Villages (ភូមិ Phum).

=== Andoung Meas District ===
Andoung Meas contains 3 Communes (ឃុំ Khum) and 21 Villages (ភូមិ Phum).

#	Name	Khmer	UNGEGN	Administrative Unit	Geocode	# of Villages
1	Malik	ម៉ាលិក		Commune (ឃុំ Khum)	160101	4
2	Nhang	ញ៉ាង		Commune (ឃុំ Khum)	160103	12
3	Ta Lav	តាឡាវ		Commune (ឃុំ Khum)	160104	5

=== Ban Lung Municipality ===
Ban Lung contains 4 Quarters (សង្កាត់ Sangkat) and 19 Villages (ភូមិ Phum).

#	Name	Khmer	UNGEGN	Administrative Unit	Geocode	# of Villages
1	Kachanh	កាចាញ		Quarter (សង្កាត់ Sangkat)	160201	4
2	Labansiek	ឡាបានសៀក		Quarter (សង្កាត់ Sangkat)	160202	5
3	Yeak Laom	យក្ខឡោម		Quarter (សង្កាត់ Sangkat)	160203	5
4	Boeng Kansaeng	បឹងកន្សែង		Quarter (សង្កាត់ Sangkat)	160204	5

=== Bar Kaev District ===
Bar Kaev contains 6 Communes (ឃុំ Khum) and 34 Villages (ភូមិ Phum).

#	Name	Khmer	UNGEGN	Administrative Unit	Geocode	# of Villages
1	Kak	កក់		Commune (ឃុំ Khum)	160301	6
2	Keh Chong	កិះចុង		Commune (ឃុំ Khum)	160302	9
3	La Minh	ឡាមីញ		Commune (ឃុំ Khum)	160303	5
4	Lung Khung	លុងឃុង		Commune (ឃុំ Khum)	160304	4
5	Saeung	ស៊ើង		Commune (ឃុំ Khum)	160305	6
6	Ting Chak	ទីងចាក់		Commune (ឃុំ Khum)	160306	4

=== Koun Mom District ===
Koun Mom contains 6 Communes (ឃុំ Khum) and 23 Villages (ភូមិ Phum).

#	Name	Khmer	UNGEGN	Administrative Unit	Geocode	# of Villages
1	Serei Mongkol	សិរីមង្គល		Commune (ឃុំ Khum)	160401	3
2	Srae Angkrorng	ស្រែអង្គ្រង		Commune (ឃុំ Khum)	160402	3
3	Ta Ang	តាអង		Commune (ឃុំ Khum)	160403	5
4	Teun	តឺន		Commune (ឃុំ Khum)	160404	4
5	Trapeang Chres	ត្រពាំងច្រេស		Commune (ឃុំ Khum)	160405	5
6	Trapeang Kraham	ត្រពាំងក្រហម		Commune (ឃុំ Khum)	160406	3

=== Lumphat District ===
Lumphat contains 6 Communes (ឃុំ Khum) and 26 Villages (ភូមិ Phum).

#	Name	Khmer	UNGEGN	Administrative Unit	Geocode	# of Villages
1	Chey Otdam	ជ័យឧត្ដម		Commune (ឃុំ Khum)	160501	6
2	Ka Laeng	កាឡែង		Commune (ឃុំ Khum)	160502	3
3	Lbang Muoy	ល្បាំង១		Commune (ឃុំ Khum)	160503	4
4	Lbang Pir	ល្បាំង២		Commune (ឃុំ Khum)	160504	2
5	Ba Tang	បាតាង		Commune (ឃុំ Khum)	160505	4
6	Seda	សេដា		Commune (ឃុំ Khum)	160506	7

=== Ou Chum District ===
Ou Chum contains 7 Communes (ឃុំ Khum) and 37 Villages (ភូមិ Phum).

#	Name	Khmer	UNGEGN	Administrative Unit	Geocode	# of Villages
1	Cha Ung	ចាអ៊ុង		Commune (ឃុំ Khum)	160601	5
2	Pouy	ប៉ូយ		Commune (ឃុំ Khum)	160602	8
3	Aekakpheap	ឯកភាព		Commune (ឃុំ Khum)	160603	4
4	Kalai	កាឡៃ		Commune (ឃុំ Khum)	160604	3
5	Ou Chum	អូរជុំ		Commune (ឃុំ Khum)	160605	8
6	Sameakki	សាមគ្គី		Commune (ឃុំ Khum)	160606	4
7	L'ak	ល្អក់		Commune (ឃុំ Khum)	160607	5

=== Ou Ya Dav District ===
Ou Ya Dav contains 7 Communes (ឃុំ Khum) and 29 Villages (ភូមិ Phum).

#	Name	Khmer	UNGEGN	Administrative Unit	Geocode	# of Villages
1	Bar Kham	បរខាំ		Commune (ឃុំ Khum)	160701	6
2	Lum Choar	លំជ័រ		Commune (ឃុំ Khum)	160702	4
3	Pak Nhai	ប៉ក់ញ៉ៃ		Commune (ឃុំ Khum)	160703	4
4	Pa Te	ប៉ាតេ		Commune (ឃុំ Khum)	160704	4
5	Sesan	សេសាន		Commune (ឃុំ Khum)	160705	3
6	Saom Thum	សោមធំ		Commune (ឃុំ Khum)	160706	3
7	Ya Tung	យ៉ាទុង		Commune (ឃុំ Khum)	160707	5

=== Ta Veaeng District ===
Ta Veaeng contains 2 Communes (ឃុំ Khum) and 20 Villages (ភូមិ Phum).

#	Name	Khmer	UNGEGN	Administrative Unit	Geocode	# of Villages
1	Ta Veaeng Leu	តាវែងលើ		Commune (ឃុំ Khum)	160801	10
2	Ta Veaeng Kraom	តាវែងក្រោម		Commune (ឃុំ Khum)	160802	10

=== Veun Sai District ===
Veun Sai contains 9 Communes (ឃុំ Khum) and 34 Villages (ភូមិ Phum).

#	Name	Khmer	UNGEGN	Administrative Unit	Geocode	# of Villages
1	Pong	ប៉ុង		Commune (ឃុំ Khum)	160901	2
2	Hat Pak	ហាត់ប៉ក់		Commune (ឃុំ Khum)	160903	3
3	Ka Choun	កាចូន		Commune (ឃុំ Khum)	160904	6
4	Kaoh Pang	កោះប៉ង់		Commune (ឃុំ Khum)	160905	3
5	Kaoh Peak	កោះពាក្យ		Commune (ឃុំ Khum)	160906	3
6	Kok Lak	កុកឡាក់		Commune (ឃុំ Khum)	160907	4
7	Pa Kalan	ប៉ាកាឡាន់		Commune (ឃុំ Khum)	160908	2
8	Phnum Kok	ភ្នំកុក		Commune (ឃុំ Khum)	160909	5
9	Veun Sai	វើនសៃ		Commune (ឃុំ Khum)	160910	6

== Siem Reap Province ==
Siem Reap contains 86 Communes (ឃុំ Khum), 14 Quarters (សង្កាត់ Sangkat) and 909 Villages (ភូមិ Phum).

=== Angkor Chum District ===
Angkor Chum contains 7 Communes (ឃុំ Khum) and 86 Villages (ភូមិ Phum).

#	Name	Khmer	UNGEGN	Administrative Unit	Geocode	# of Villages
1	Char Chhuk	ចារឈូក		Commune (ឃុំ Khum)	170101	20
2	Doun Peng	ដូនពេង		Commune (ឃុំ Khum)	170102	8
3	Kouk Doung	គោកដូង		Commune (ឃុំ Khum)	170103	17
4	Koul	គោល		Commune (ឃុំ Khum)	170104	7
5	Nokor Pheas	នគរភាស		Commune (ឃុំ Khum)	170105	10
6	Srae Khvav	ស្រែខ្វាវ		Commune (ឃុំ Khum)	170106	11
7	Ta Saom	តាសោម		Commune (ឃុំ Khum)	170107	13

=== Angkor Thum District ===
Angkor Thum contains 4 Communes (ឃុំ Khum) and 25 Villages (ភូមិ Phum).

#	Name	Khmer	UNGEGN	Administrative Unit	Geocode	# of Villages
1	Chob Ta Trav	ជប់តាត្រាវ		Commune (ឃុំ Khum)	170201	5
2	Leang Dai	លាងដៃ		Commune (ឃុំ Khum)	170202	8
3	Peak Snaeng	ពាក់ស្នែង		Commune (ឃុំ Khum)	170203	6
4	Svay Chek	ស្វាយចេក		Commune (ឃុំ Khum)	170204	6

=== Banteay Srei District ===
Banteay Srei contains 5 Communes (ឃុំ Khum) and 29 Villages (ភូមិ Phum).

#	Name	Khmer	UNGEGN	Administrative Unit	Geocode	# of Villages
1	Khnar Sanday	ខ្នារសណ្ដាយ		Commune (ឃុំ Khum)	170301	6
2	Khun Ream	ឃុនរាម		Commune (ឃុំ Khum)	170302	7
3	Preah Dak	ព្រះដាក់		Commune (ឃុំ Khum)	170303	6
4	Rumchek	រំចេក		Commune (ឃុំ Khum)	170304	3
5	Tbaeng	ត្បែង		Commune (ឃុំ Khum)	170306	7

=== Chi Kraeng District ===
Chi Kraeng contains 12 Communes (ឃុំ Khum) and 155 Villages (ភូមិ Phum).

#	Name	Khmer	UNGEGN	Administrative Unit	Geocode	# of Villages
1	Anlong Samnar	អន្លង់សំណរ		Commune (ឃុំ Khum)	170401	16
2	Chi Kraeng	ជីក្រែង		Commune (ឃុំ Khum)	170402	14
3	Kampong Kdei	កំពង់ក្ដី		Commune (ឃុំ Khum)	170403	16
4	Khvav	ខ្វាវ		Commune (ឃុំ Khum)	170404	10
5	Kouk Thlok Kraom	គោកធ្លកក្រោម		Commune (ឃុំ Khum)	170405	18
6	Kouk Thlok Leu	គោកធ្លកលើ		Commune (ឃុំ Khum)	170406	13
7	Lveaeng Ruessei	ល្វែងឫស្សី		Commune (ឃុំ Khum)	170407	13
8	Pongro Kraom	ពង្រក្រោម		Commune (ឃុំ Khum)	170408	13
9	Pongro Leu	ពង្រលើ		Commune (ឃុំ Khum)	170409	10
10	Ruessei Lok	ឫស្សីលក		Commune (ឃុំ Khum)	170410	8
11	Sangvaeuy	សង្វើយ		Commune (ឃុំ Khum)	170411	9
12	Spean Tnaot	ស្ពានត្នោត		Commune (ឃុំ Khum)	170412	15

=== Kralanh District ===
Kralanh contains 10 Communes (ឃុំ Khum) and 98 Villages (ភូមិ Phum).

#	Name	Khmer	UNGEGN	Administrative Unit	Geocode	# of Villages
1	Chanleas Dai	ចន្លាសដៃ		Commune (ឃុំ Khum)	170601	12
2	Kampong Thkov	កំពង់ថ្កូវ		Commune (ឃុំ Khum)	170602	8
3	Kralanh	ក្រឡាញ់		Commune (ឃុំ Khum)	170603	7
4	Krouch Kor	ក្រូចគរ		Commune (ឃុំ Khum)	170604	6
5	Roung Kou	រោងគោ		Commune (ឃុំ Khum)	170605	9
6	Sambuor	សំបួរ		Commune (ឃុំ Khum)	170606	8
7	Saen Sokh	សែនសុខ		Commune (ឃុំ Khum)	170607	16
8	Snuol	ស្នួល		Commune (ឃុំ Khum)	170608	9
9	Sranal	ស្រណាល		Commune (ឃុំ Khum)	170609	13
10	Ta An	តាអាន		Commune (ឃុំ Khum)	170610	10

=== Puok District ===
Puok contains 14 Communes (ឃុំ Khum) and 132 Villages (ភូមិ Phum).

#	Name	Khmer	UNGEGN	Administrative Unit	Geocode	# of Villages
1	Sasar Sdam	សសរស្ដម្ភ		Commune (ឃុំ Khum)	170701	14
2	Doun Kaev	ដូនកែវ		Commune (ឃុំ Khum)	170702	13
3	Kdei Run	ក្ដីរុន		Commune (ឃុំ Khum)	170703	7
4	Kaev Poar	កែវពណ៌		Commune (ឃុំ Khum)	170704	8
5	Khnat	ខ្នាត		Commune (ឃុំ Khum)	170705	12
6	Lvea	ល្វា		Commune (ឃុំ Khum)	170707	12
7	Mukh Paen	មុខប៉ែន		Commune (ឃុំ Khum)	170708	6
8	Pou Treay	ពោធិ៍ទ្រាយ		Commune (ឃុំ Khum)	170709	2
9	Puok	ពួក		Commune (ឃុំ Khum)	170710	11
10	Prey Chruk	ព្រៃជ្រូក		Commune (ឃុំ Khum)	170711	12
11	Reul	រើល		Commune (ឃុំ Khum)	170712	14
12	Samraong Yea	សំរោងយា		Commune (ឃុំ Khum)	170713	6
13	Trei Nhoar	ត្រីញ័រ		Commune (ឃុំ Khum)	170715	10
14	Yeang	យាង		Commune (ឃុំ Khum)	170716	5

=== Prasat Bakong District ===
Prasat Bakong contains 8 Communes (ឃុំ Khum) and 59 Villages (ភូមិ Phum).

#	Name	Khmer	UNGEGN	Administrative Unit	Geocode	# of Villages
1	Bakong	បាគង		Commune (ឃុំ Khum)	170902	6
2	Kampong Phluk	កំពង់ភ្លុក		Commune (ឃុំ Khum)	170904	3
3	Kantreang	កន្ទ្រាំង		Commune (ឃុំ Khum)	170905	8
4	Kandaek	កណ្ដែក		Commune (ឃុំ Khum)	170906	10
5	Mean Chey	មានជ័យ		Commune (ឃុំ Khum)	170907	6
6	Roluos	រលួស		Commune (ឃុំ Khum)	170908	7
7	Trapeang Thum	ត្រពាំងធំ		Commune (ឃុំ Khum)	170909	9
8	Ampil	អំពិល		Commune (ឃុំ Khum)	170910	10

=== Siem Reap Municipality ===
Siem Reap contains 12 Quarters (សង្កាត់ Sangkat) and 99 Villages (ភូមិ Phum).

#	Name	Khmer	UNGEGN	Administrative Unit	Geocode	# of Villages
1	Sla Kram	ស្លក្រាម		Quarter (សង្កាត់ Sangkat)	171001	8
2	Svay Dankum	ស្វាយដង្គំ		Quarter (សង្កាត់ Sangkat)	171002	14
3	Kok Chak	គោកចក		Quarter (សង្កាត់ Sangkat)	171003	8
4	Sala Kamreuk	សាលាកំរើក		Quarter (សង្កាត់ Sangkat)	171004	7
5	Nokor Thum	នគរធំ		Quarter (សង្កាត់ Sangkat)	171005	6
6	Chreav	ជ្រាវ		Quarter (សង្កាត់ Sangkat)	171006	7
7	Chong Khnies	ចុងឃ្នៀស		Quarter (សង្កាត់ Sangkat)	171007	7
8	Sngkat Sambuor	សំបួរ		Quarter (សង្កាត់ Sangkat)	171008	5
9	Siem Reap	សៀមរាប	Siĕm Réab	Quarter (សង្កាត់ Sangkat)	171009	8
10	Srangae	ស្រង៉ែ		Quarter (សង្កាត់ Sangkat)	171010	7
11	Krabei Riel	ក្របីរៀល		Quarter (សង្កាត់ Sangkat)	171012	12
12	Tuek Vil	ទឹកវិល		Quarter (សង្កាត់ Sangkat)	171013	10

=== Soutr Nikom District ===
Soutr Nikom contains 10 Communes (ឃុំ Khum) and 113 Villages (ភូមិ Phum).

#	Name	Khmer	UNGEGN	Administrative Unit	Geocode	# of Villages
1	Chan Sa	ចាន់ស		Commune (ឃុំ Khum)	171101	19
2	Dam Daek	ដំដែក		Commune (ឃុំ Khum)	171102	13
3	Dan Run	ដានរុន		Commune (ឃុំ Khum)	171103	13
4	Kampong Khleang	កំពង់ឃ្លាំង		Commune (ឃុំ Khum)	171104	10
5	Kien Sangkae	កៀនសង្កែ		Commune (ឃុំ Khum)	171105	12
6	Khchas	ខ្ចាស់		Commune (ឃុំ Khum)	171106	7
7	Khnar Pou	ខ្នារពោធិ៍		Commune (ឃុំ Khum)	171107	8
8	Popel	ពពេល		Commune (ឃុំ Khum)	171108	13
9	Samraong	សំរោង		Commune (ឃុំ Khum)	171109	9
10	Ta Yaek	តាយ៉ែក		Commune (ឃុំ Khum)	171110	9

=== Srei Snam District ===
Srei Snam contains 6 Communes (ឃុំ Khum) and 39 Villages (ភូមិ Phum).

#	Name	Khmer	UNGEGN	Administrative Unit	Geocode	# of Villages
1	Chrouy Neang Nguon	ជ្រោយនាងងួន		Commune (ឃុំ Khum)	171201	7
2	Klang Hay	ក្លាំងហាយ		Commune (ឃុំ Khum)	171202	7
3	Tram Sasar	ត្រាំសសរ		Commune (ឃុំ Khum)	171203	7
4	Moung	មោង		Commune (ឃុំ Khum)	171204	5
5	Prei	ប្រីយ៍		Commune (ឃុំ Khum)	171205	5
6	Slaeng Spean	ស្លែងស្ពាន		Commune (ឃុំ Khum)	171206	8

=== Svay Leu District ===
Svay Leu contains 5 Communes (ឃុំ Khum) and 34 Villages (ភូមិ Phum).

#	Name	Khmer	UNGEGN	Administrative Unit	Geocode	# of Villages
1	Boeng Mealea	បឹងមាលា		Commune (ឃុំ Khum)	171301	7
2	Kantuot	កន្ទួត		Commune (ឃុំ Khum)	171302	6
3	Khnang Phnum	ខ្នងភ្នំ		Commune (ឃុំ Khum)	171303	5
4	Svay Leu	ស្វាយលើ		Commune (ឃុំ Khum)	171304	10
5	Ta Siem	តាសៀម		Commune (ឃុំ Khum)	171305	6

=== Varin District ===
Varin contains 5 Communes (ឃុំ Khum) and 25 Villages (ភូមិ Phum).

#	Name	Khmer	UNGEGN	Administrative Unit	Geocode	# of Villages
1	Prasat	ប្រាសាទ		Commune (ឃុំ Khum)	171401	5
2	Lvea Krang	ល្វាក្រាំង		Commune (ឃុំ Khum)	171402	3
3	Srae Nouy	ស្រែណូយ		Commune (ឃុំ Khum)	171403	6
4	Svay Sa	ស្វាយ ស		Commune (ឃុំ Khum)	171404	6
5	Varin	វ៉ារិន		Commune (ឃុំ Khum)	171405	5

=== Run Ta Aek Techo Sen Municipality ===
Run Ta Aek Techo Sen contains 2 Quarters (សង្កាត់ Sangkat) and 15 Villages (ភូមិ Phum).

#	Name	Khmer	UNGEGN	Administrative Unit	Geocode	# of Villages
1	Run Ta Aek	រុនតាឯក		Quarter (សង្កាត់ Sangkat)	171501	7
2	Ballangk	បល្ល័ង្ក		Quarter (សង្កាត់ Sangkat)	171502	8

== Preah Sihanouk Province ==
Preah Sihanouk contains 11 Quarters (សង្កាត់ Sangkat), 18 Communes (ឃុំ Khum) and 111 Villages (ភូមិ Phum).

=== Preah Sihanouk Municipality ===
Preah Sihanouk contains 4 Quarters (សង្កាត់ Sangkat) and 15 Villages (ភូមិ Phum).

#	Name	Khmer	UNGEGN	Administrative Unit	Geocode	# of Villages
1	lek Muoy	លេខ១		Quarter (សង្កាត់ Sangkat)	180101	3
2	Pir	២		Quarter (សង្កាត់ Sangkat)	180102	3
3	Bei	៣		Quarter (សង្កាត់ Sangkat)	180103	3
4	Buon	៤		Quarter (សង្កាត់ Sangkat)	180104	6

=== Prey Nob District ===
Prey Nob contains 10 Communes (ឃុំ Khum) and 42 Villages (ភូមិ Phum).

#	Name	Khmer	UNGEGN	Administrative Unit	Geocode	# of Villages
1	Andoung Thma	អណ្ដូងថ្ម		Commune (ឃុំ Khum)	180201	5
2	Cheung Kou	ជើងគោ		Commune (ឃុំ Khum)	180204	4
3	Prey Nob	ព្រៃនប់		Commune (ឃុំ Khum)	180207	5
4	Sameakki	សាមគ្គី		Commune (ឃុំ Khum)	180209	3
5	Samrong	សំរុង		Commune (ឃុំ Khum)	180210	5
6	Tuek L'ak	ទឹកល្អក់		Commune (ឃុំ Khum)	180211	4
7	Tuek Thla	ទឹកថ្លា		Commune (ឃុំ Khum)	180212	4
8	Tuol Totueng	ទួលទទឹង		Commune (ឃុំ Khum)	180213	4
9	Veal Renh	វាលរេញ		Commune (ឃុំ Khum)	180214	3
10	Ta Ney	តានៃ		Commune (ឃុំ Khum)	180215	5

=== Stueng Hav District ===
Stueng Hav contains 4 Communes (ឃុំ Khum) and 13 Villages (ភូមិ Phum).

#	Name	Khmer	UNGEGN	Administrative Unit	Geocode	# of Villages
1	Kampenh	កំពេញ		Commune (ឃុំ Khum)	180301	2
2	Ou Treh	អូរត្រេះ		Commune (ឃុំ Khum)	180302	4
3	Tumnob Rolok	ទំនប់រលក		Commune (ឃុំ Khum)	180303	4
4	Kaev Phos	កែវផុស		Commune (ឃុំ Khum)	180304	3

=== Kampong Seila District ===
Kampong Seila contains 4 Communes (ឃុំ Khum) and 14 Villages (ភូមិ Phum).

#	Name	Khmer	UNGEGN	Administrative Unit	Geocode	# of Villages
1	Chamkar Luong	ចំការហ្លួង		Commune (ឃុំ Khum)	180401	3
2	Kampong Seila	កំពង់សីលា		Commune (ឃុំ Khum)	180402	4
3	Ou Bak Roteh	អូរបាក់រទេះ		Commune (ឃុំ Khum)	180403	3
4	Stueng Chhay	ស្ទឹងឆាយ		Commune (ឃុំ Khum)	180404	4

=== Kaoh Rung Municipality ===
Kaoh Rung contains 2 Quarters (សង្កាត់ Sangkat) and 4 Villages (ភូមិ Phum).

#	Name	Khmer	UNGEGN	Administrative Unit	Geocode	# of Villages
1	Kaoh Rung	កោះរ៉ុង		Quarter (សង្កាត់ Sangkat)	180501	2
2	Koah Rung Sonlem	កោះរ៉ុងសន្លឹម		Quarter (សង្កាត់ Sangkat)	180502	2

=== Kampong Soam Municipality ===
Kampong Soam contains 5 Quarters (សង្កាត់ Sangkat) and 23 Villages (ភូមិ Phum).

#	Name	Khmer	UNGEGN	Administrative Unit	Geocode	# of Villages
1	Ream	រាម		Quarter (សង្កាត់ Sangkat)	180601	4
2	Bet Trang	បិតត្រាង		Quarter (សង្កាត់ Sangkat)	180602	3
3	Ou Oknha Heng	អូរឧកញ៉ាហេង		Quarter (សង្កាត់ Sangkat)	180603	5
4	Boeng Ta Prum	បឹងតាព្រហ្ម		Quarter (សង្កាត់ Sangkat)	180604	6
5	Ou Chrov	អូរជ្រៅ		Quarter (សង្កាត់ Sangkat)	180605	5

== Stung Treng Province ==
Stung Treng contains 30 Communes (ឃុំ Khum), 4 Quarters (សង្កាត់ Sangkat) and 137 Villages (ភូមិ Phum).

=== Sesan District ===
Sesan contains 7 Communes (ឃុំ Khum) and 22 Villages (ភូមិ Phum).

#	Name	Khmer	UNGEGN	Administrative Unit	Geocode	# of Villages
1	Kamphun	កំភុន		Commune (ឃុំ Khum)	190101	4
2	Kbal Romeas	ក្បាលរមាស		Commune (ឃុំ Khum)	190102	4
3	Phluk	ភ្លុក		Commune (ឃុំ Khum)	190103	2
4	Samkhuoy	សាមឃួយ		Commune (ឃុំ Khum)	190104	4
5	Sdau	ស្ដៅ		Commune (ឃុំ Khum)	190105	2
6	Srae Kor	ស្រែគរ		Commune (ឃុំ Khum)	190106	2
7	Ta Lat	តាឡាត		Commune (ឃុំ Khum)	190107	4

=== Siem Bouk District ===
Siem Bouk contains 7 Communes (ឃុំ Khum) and 17 Villages (ភូមិ Phum).

#	Name	Khmer	UNGEGN	Administrative Unit	Geocode	# of Villages
1	Kaoh Preah	កោះព្រះ		Commune (ឃុំ Khum)	190201	1
2	Kaoh Sampeay	កោះសំពាយ		Commune (ឃុំ Khum)	190202	2
3	Kaoh Sralay	កោះស្រឡាយ		Commune (ឃុំ Khum)	190203	4
4	Ou Mreah	អូរម្រះ		Commune (ឃុំ Khum)	190204	4
5	Ou Ruessei Kandal	អូរឫស្សីកណ្ដាល		Commune (ឃុំ Khum)	190205	1
6	Siem Bouk	សៀមបូក		Commune (ឃុំ Khum)	190206	3
7	Srae Krasang	ស្រែក្រសាំង		Commune (ឃុំ Khum)	190207	2

=== Siem Pang District ===
Siem Pang contains 5 Communes (ឃុំ Khum) and 27 Villages (ភូមិ Phum).

#	Name	Khmer	UNGEGN	Administrative Unit	Geocode	# of Villages
1	Preaek Meas	ព្រែកមាស		Commune (ឃុំ Khum)	190301	4
2	Sekong	សេកុង		Commune (ឃុំ Khum)	190302	8
3	Santepheap	សន្ដិភាព		Commune (ឃុំ Khum)	190303	6
4	Srae Sambour	ស្រែសំបូរ		Commune (ឃុំ Khum)	190304	6
5	Tma Kaev	ថ្មកែវ		Commune (ឃុំ Khum)	190305	3

=== Stueng Traeng Municipality ===
Stueng Traeng contains 4 Quarters (សង្កាត់ Sangkat) and 22 Villages (ភូមិ Phum).

#	Name	Khmer	UNGEGN	Administrative Unit	Geocode	# of Villages
1	Stueng Traeng	ស្ទឹងត្រែង		Quarter (សង្កាត់ Sangkat)	190401	10
2	Srah Ruessei	ស្រះឫស្សី		Quarter (សង្កាត់ Sangkat)	190402	3
3	Preah Bat	ព្រះបាទ		Quarter (សង្កាត់ Sangkat)	190403	3
4	Sameakki	សាមគ្គី		Quarter (សង្កាត់ Sangkat)	190404	6

=== Thala Barivat District ===
Thala Barivat contains 8 Communes (ឃុំ Khum) and 31 Villages (ភូមិ Phum).

#	Name	Khmer	UNGEGN	Administrative Unit	Geocode	# of Villages
1	Anlong Phe	អន្លង់ភេ		Commune (ឃុំ Khum)	190501	5
2	Chamkar Leu	ចំការលើ		Commune (ឃុំ Khum)	190502	3
3	Kang Cham	កាំងចាម		Commune (ឃុំ Khum)	190503	5
4	Anlong Chrey	អន្លង់ជ្រៃ		Commune (ឃុំ Khum)	190505	4
5	Ou Rai	អូររ៉ៃ		Commune (ឃុំ Khum)	190506	4
6	Sam Ang	សំអាង		Commune (ឃុំ Khum)	190509	4
7	Srae Ruessei	ស្រែឫស្សី		Commune (ឃុំ Khum)	190510	2
8	Thala Barivat	ថាឡាបរិវ៉ាត់		Commune (ឃុំ Khum)	190511	4

=== Borei Ou Svay Senchey District ===
Borei Ou Svay Senchey contains 3 Communes (ឃុំ Khum) and 18 Villages (ភូមិ Phum).

#	Name	Khmer	UNGEGN	Administrative Unit	Geocode	# of Villages
1	Ou Svay	អូរស្វាយ		Commune (ឃុំ Khum)	190601	6
2	Kaoh Snaeng	កោះស្នែង		Commune (ឃុំ Khum)	190602	4
3	Preah Rumkel	ព្រះរំកិល		Commune (ឃុំ Khum)	190603	8

== Svay Rieng Province ==
Svay Rieng contains 68 Communes (ឃុំ Khum), 12 Quarters (សង្កាត់ Sangkat) and 690 Villages (ភូមិ Phum).

=== Chantrea District ===
Chantrea contains 6 Communes (ឃុំ Khum) and 29 Villages (ភូមិ Phum).

#	Name	Khmer	UNGEGN	Administrative Unit	Geocode	# of Villages
1	Chantrea	ចន្ទ្រា		Commune (ឃុំ Khum)	200103	4
2	Chres	ច្រេស		Commune (ឃុំ Khum)	200104	8
3	Me Sar Thngak	មេ សរថ្ងក		Commune (ឃុំ Khum)	200105	6
4	Prey Kokir	ព្រៃគគីរ		Commune (ឃុំ Khum)	200108	5
5	Samraong	សំរោង		Commune (ឃុំ Khum)	200109	3
6	Tuol Sdei	ទួលស្ដី		Commune (ឃុំ Khum)	200110	3

=== Kampong Rou District ===
Kampong Rou contains 11 Communes (ឃុំ Khum) and 80 Villages (ភូមិ Phum).

#	Name	Khmer	UNGEGN	Administrative Unit	Geocode	# of Villages
1	Banteay Krang	បន្ទាយក្រាំង		Commune (ឃុំ Khum)	200201	5
2	Nhor	ញរ		Commune (ឃុំ Khum)	200202	6
3	Khsaetr	ខ្សែត្រ		Commune (ឃុំ Khum)	200203	14
4	Preah Ponlea	ព្រះពន្លា		Commune (ឃុំ Khum)	200204	8
5	Prey Thum	ព្រៃធំ		Commune (ឃុំ Khum)	200205	5
6	Reach Montir	រាជមន្ទីរ		Commune (ឃុំ Khum)	200206	4
7	Samlei	សំឡី		Commune (ឃុំ Khum)	200207	8
8	Samyaong	សំយ៉ោង		Commune (ឃុំ Khum)	200208	3
9	Svay Ta Yean	ស្វាយតាយាន		Commune (ឃុំ Khum)	200209	10
10	Thmei	ថ្មី		Commune (ឃុំ Khum)	200211	6
11	Tnaot	ត្នោត		Commune (ឃុំ Khum)	200212	11

=== Rumduol District ===
Rumduol contains 10 Communes (ឃុំ Khum) and 78 Villages (ភូមិ Phum).

#	Name	Khmer	UNGEGN	Administrative Unit	Geocode	# of Villages
1	Bos Mon	បុសមន		Commune (ឃុំ Khum)	200301	7
2	Thmea	ធ្មា		Commune (ឃុំ Khum)	200302	8
3	Kampong Chak	កំពង់ចក		Commune (ឃុំ Khum)	200303	6
4	Chrung Popel	ជ្រុងពពេល		Commune (ឃុំ Khum)	200304	7
5	Kampong Ampil	កំពង់អំពិល		Commune (ឃុំ Khum)	200305	7
6	Meun Chey	ម៉ឺនជ័យ		Commune (ឃុំ Khum)	200306	10
7	Pong Tuek	ពងទឹក		Commune (ឃុំ Khum)	200307	9
8	Sangkae	សង្កែ		Commune (ឃុំ Khum)	200308	8
9	Svay Chek	ស្វាយចេក		Commune (ឃុំ Khum)	200309	9
10	Thna Thnong	ថ្នាធ្នង់		Commune (ឃុំ Khum)	200310	7

=== Romeas Haek District ===
Romeas Haek contains 16 Communes (ឃុំ Khum) and 204 Villages (ភូមិ Phum).

#	Name	Khmer	UNGEGN	Administrative Unit	Geocode	# of Villages
1	Ampil	អំពិល		Commune (ឃុំ Khum)	200401	10
2	Andoung Pou	អណ្ដូងពោធិ៍		Commune (ឃុំ Khum)	200402	10
3	Andoung Trabaek	អណ្ដូងត្របែក		Commune (ឃុំ Khum)	200403	6
4	Angk Prasrae	អង្គប្រស្រែ		Commune (ឃុំ Khum)	200404	12
5	Chantrei	ចន្ដ្រី		Commune (ឃុំ Khum)	200405	18
6	Chrey Thum	ជ្រៃធំ		Commune (ឃុំ Khum)	200406	14
7	Doung	ដូង		Commune (ឃុំ Khum)	200407	22
8	Kampong Trach	កំពង់ត្រាច		Commune (ឃុំ Khum)	200408	10
9	Kokir	គគីរ		Commune (ឃុំ Khum)	200409	5
10	Krasang	ក្រសាំង		Commune (ឃុំ Khum)	200410	10
11	Mukh Da	មុខដា		Commune (ឃុំ Khum)	200411	10
12	Mream	ម្រាម		Commune (ឃុំ Khum)	200412	20
13	Sambuor	សំបួរ		Commune (ឃុំ Khum)	200413	11
14	Sambatt Mean Chey	សម្បត្ដិមានជ័យ		Commune (ឃុំ Khum)	200414	13
15	Trapeang Sdau	ត្រពាំងស្ដៅ		Commune (ឃុំ Khum)	200415	20
16	Tras	ត្រស់		Commune (ឃុំ Khum)	200416	13

=== Svay Chrum District ===
Svay Chrum contains 16 Communes (ឃុំ Khum) and 158 Villages (ភូមិ Phum).

#	Name	Khmer	UNGEGN	Administrative Unit	Geocode	# of Villages
1	Angk Ta Sou	អង្គតាសូ		Commune (ឃុំ Khum)	200501	12
2	Basak	បាសាក់		Commune (ឃុំ Khum)	200502	5
3	Chambak	ចំបក់		Commune (ឃុំ Khum)	200503	7
4	Kampong Chamlang	កំពង់ចំឡង		Commune (ឃុំ Khum)	200504	7
5	Ta Suos	តាសួស		Commune (ឃុំ Khum)	200505	8
6	Chheu Teal	ឈើទាល		Commune (ឃុំ Khum)	200507	12
7	Doun Sa	ដូនស		Commune (ឃុំ Khum)	200508	11
8	Kouk Pring	គោកព្រីង		Commune (ឃុំ Khum)	200509	10
9	Kraol Kou	ក្រោលគោ		Commune (ឃុំ Khum)	200510	13
10	Kruos	គ្រួស		Commune (ឃុំ Khum)	200511	11
11	Pouthi Reach	ពោធិរាជ		Commune (ឃុំ Khum)	200512	11
12	Svay Angk	ស្វាយអង្គ		Commune (ឃុំ Khum)	200513	9
13	Svay Chrum	ស្វាយជ្រំ		Commune (ឃុំ Khum)	200514	7
14	Svay Thum	ស្វាយធំ		Commune (ឃុំ Khum)	200515	12
15	Svay Yea	ស្វាយយា		Commune (ឃុំ Khum)	200516	15
16	Thlok	ធ្លក		Commune (ឃុំ Khum)	200517	8

=== Svay Rieng Municipality ===
Svay Rieng contains 7 Quarters (សង្កាត់ Sangkat) and 43 Villages (ភូមិ Phum).

#	Name	Khmer	UNGEGN	Administrative Unit	Geocode	# of Villages
1	Svay Rieng	ស្វាយរៀង		Quarter (សង្កាត់ Sangkat)	200601	7
2	Prey Chhlak	ព្រៃឆ្លាក់		Quarter (សង្កាត់ Sangkat)	200602	5
3	Koy Trabaek	គយត្របែក		Quarter (សង្កាត់ Sangkat)	200603	2
4	Pou Ta Hao	ពោធិ៍តាហោ		Quarter (សង្កាត់ Sangkat)	200604	4
5	Chek	ចេក		Quarter (សង្កាត់ Sangkat)	200605	10
6	Svay Toea	ស្វាយតឿ		Quarter (សង្កាត់ Sangkat)	200606	7
7	Sangkhoar	សង្ឃរ័		Quarter (សង្កាត់ Sangkat)	200607	8

=== Svay Teab District ===
Svay Teab contains 9 Communes (ឃុំ Khum) and 63 Villages (ភូមិ Phum).

#	Name	Khmer	UNGEGN	Administrative Unit	Geocode	# of Villages
1	Koki Saom	គគីសោម		Commune (ឃុំ Khum)	200702	8
2	Kandieng Reay	កណ្ដៀងរាយ		Commune (ឃុំ Khum)	200703	9
3	Monourom	មនោរម្យ		Commune (ឃុំ Khum)	200704	2
4	Popeaet	ពពែត		Commune (ឃុំ Khum)	200705	6
5	Prey Ta Ei	ព្រៃតាអី		Commune (ឃុំ Khum)	200706	6
6	Prasoutr	ប្រសូត្រ		Commune (ឃុំ Khum)	200707	9
7	Romeang Thkaol	រមាំងថ្កោល		Commune (ឃុំ Khum)	200708	9
8	Sambuor	សំបួរ		Commune (ឃុំ Khum)	200709	8
9	Svay Rumpear	ស្វាយរំពារ		Commune (ឃុំ Khum)	200711	6

=== Bavet Municipality ===
Bavet contains 5 Quarters (សង្កាត់ Sangkat) and 35 Villages (ភូមិ Phum).

#	Name	Khmer	UNGEGN	Administrative Unit	Geocode	# of Villages
1	Bati	បាទី		Quarter (សង្កាត់ Sangkat)	200801	5
2	Bavet	បាវិត		Quarter (សង្កាត់ Sangkat)	200802	5
3	Chrak Mtes	ច្រកម្ទេស		Quarter (សង្កាត់ Sangkat)	200803	15
4	Prasat	ប្រាសាទ		Quarter (សង្កាត់ Sangkat)	200804	2
5	Prey Angkunh	ព្រៃអង្គុញ		Quarter (សង្កាត់ Sangkat)	200805	8

== Takéo Province ==
Takéo contains 97 Communes (ឃុំ Khum), 3 Quarters (សង្កាត់ Sangkat) and 1,121 Villages (ភូមិ Phum).

=== Angkor Borei District ===
Angkor Borei contains 6 Communes (ឃុំ Khum) and 34 Villages (ភូមិ Phum).

#	Name	Khmer	UNGEGN	Administrative Unit	Geocode	# of Villages
1	Angkor Borei	អង្គរបូរី		Commune (ឃុំ Khum)	210101	6
2	Ba Srae	បាស្រែ		Commune (ឃុំ Khum)	210102	8
3	Kouk Thlok	គោកធ្លក		Commune (ឃុំ Khum)	210103	4
4	Ponley	ពន្លៃ		Commune (ឃុំ Khum)	210104	6
5	Preaek Phtoul	ព្រែកផ្ទោល		Commune (ឃុំ Khum)	210105	4
6	Prey Phkoam	ព្រៃផ្គាំ		Commune (ឃុំ Khum)	210106	6

=== Bati District ===
Bati contains 15 Communes (ឃុំ Khum) and 168 Villages (ភូមិ Phum).

#	Name	Khmer	UNGEGN	Administrative Unit	Geocode	# of Villages
1	Chambak	ចំបក់		Commune (ឃុំ Khum)	210201	12
2	Champei	ចំប៉ី		Commune (ឃុំ Khum)	210202	7
3	Doung	ដូង		Commune (ឃុំ Khum)	210203	8
4	Kandoeng	កណ្ដឹង		Commune (ឃុំ Khum)	210204	8
5	Komar Reachea	កុមាររាជា		Commune (ឃុំ Khum)	210205	13
6	Krang Leav	ក្រាំងលាវ		Commune (ឃុំ Khum)	210206	23
7	Krang Thnong	ក្រាំងធ្នង់		Commune (ឃុំ Khum)	210207	8
8	Lumpong	លំពង់		Commune (ឃុំ Khum)	210208	12
9	Pea Ream	ពារាម		Commune (ឃុំ Khum)	210209	8
10	Pot Sar	ពត់សរ		Commune (ឃុំ Khum)	210210	11
11	Sour Phi	សូរភី		Commune (ឃុំ Khum)	210211	8
12	Tang Doung	តាំងដូង		Commune (ឃុំ Khum)	210212	10
13	Tnaot	ត្នោត		Commune (ឃុំ Khum)	210213	8
14	Trapeang Krasang	ត្រពាំងក្រសាំង		Commune (ឃុំ Khum)	210214	17
15	Trapeang Sab	ត្រពាំងសាប		Commune (ឃុំ Khum)	210215	15

=== Borei Cholsar District ===
Borei Cholsar contains 5 Communes (ឃុំ Khum) and 39 Villages (ភូមិ Phum).

#	Name	Khmer	UNGEGN	Administrative Unit	Geocode	# of Villages
1	Borei Cholsar	បូរីជលសារ		Commune (ឃុំ Khum)	210301	7
2	Chey Chouk	ជ័យជោគ		Commune (ឃុំ Khum)	210302	7
3	Doung Khpos	ដូងខ្ពស់		Commune (ឃុំ Khum)	210303	12
4	Kampong Krasang	កំពង់ក្រសាំង		Commune (ឃុំ Khum)	210304	5
5	Kouk Pou	គោកពោធិ៍		Commune (ឃុំ Khum)	210305	8

=== Kiri Vong District ===
Kiri Vong contains 12 Communes (ឃុំ Khum) and 115 Villages (ភូមិ Phum).

#	Name	Khmer	UNGEGN	Administrative Unit	Geocode	# of Villages
1	Angk Prasat	អង្គប្រាសាទ		Commune (ឃុំ Khum)	210401	10
2	Preah Bat Choan Chum	ព្រះបាទជាន់ជុំ		Commune (ឃុំ Khum)	210402	9
3	Kamnab	កំណប់		Commune (ឃុំ Khum)	210403	6
4	Kampeaeng	កំពែង		Commune (ឃុំ Khum)	210404	13
5	Kiri Chong Kaoh	គីរីចុងកោះ		Commune (ឃុំ Khum)	210405	6
6	Kouk Prech	គោកព្រេច		Commune (ឃុំ Khum)	210406	13
7	Phnum Den	ភ្នំដិន		Commune (ឃុំ Khum)	210407	9
8	Prey Ampok	ព្រៃអំពក		Commune (ឃុំ Khum)	210408	9
9	Prey Rumdeng	ព្រៃរំដេង		Commune (ឃុំ Khum)	210409	11
10	Ream Andaeuk	រាមអណ្ដើក		Commune (ឃុំ Khum)	210410	8
11	Saom	សោម		Commune (ឃុំ Khum)	210411	12
12	Ta Ou	តាអូរ		Commune (ឃុំ Khum)	210412	9

=== Kaoh Andaet District ===
Kaoh Andaet contains 6 Communes (ឃុំ Khum) and 68 Villages (ភូមិ Phum).

#	Name	Khmer	UNGEGN	Administrative Unit	Geocode	# of Villages
1	Krapum Chhuk	ក្រពុំឈូក		Commune (ឃុំ Khum)	210501	13
2	Pech Sar	ពេជសារ		Commune (ឃុំ Khum)	210502	17
3	Prey Khla	ព្រៃខ្លា		Commune (ឃុំ Khum)	210503	15
4	Prey Yuthka	ព្រៃយុថ្កា		Commune (ឃុំ Khum)	210504	6
5	Romenh	រមេញ		Commune (ឃុំ Khum)	210505	10
6	Thlea Prachum	ធ្លាប្រជុំ		Commune (ឃុំ Khum)	210506	7

=== Prey Kabbas District ===
Prey Kabbas contains 13 Communes (ឃុំ Khum) and 112 Villages (ភូមិ Phum).

#	Name	Khmer	UNGEGN	Administrative Unit	Geocode	# of Villages
1	Angkanh	អង្កាញ់		Commune (ឃុំ Khum)	210601	6
2	Ban Kam	បានកាម		Commune (ឃុំ Khum)	210602	7
3	Champa	ចំប៉ា		Commune (ឃុំ Khum)	210603	9
4	Char	ចារ		Commune (ឃុំ Khum)	210604	9
5	Kampeaeng	កំពែង		Commune (ឃុំ Khum)	210605	9
6	Kampong Reab	កំពង់រាប		Commune (ឃុំ Khum)	210606	8
7	Kdanh	ក្ដាញ់		Commune (ឃុំ Khum)	210607	7
8	Pou Rumchak	ពោធិ៍រំចាក		Commune (ឃុំ Khum)	210608	11
9	Prey Kabbas	ព្រៃកប្បាស		Commune (ឃុំ Khum)	210609	10
10	Prey Lvea	ព្រៃល្វា		Commune (ឃុំ Khum)	210610	7
11	Prey Phdau	ព្រៃផ្ដៅ		Commune (ឃុំ Khum)	210611	11
12	Snao	ស្នោ		Commune (ឃុំ Khum)	210612	6
13	Tang Yab	តាំងយ៉ាប		Commune (ឃុំ Khum)	210613	12

=== Samraong District ===
Samraong contains 11 Communes (ឃុំ Khum) and 147 Villages (ភូមិ Phum).

#	Name	Khmer	UNGEGN	Administrative Unit	Geocode	# of Villages
1	Boeng Tranh Khang Cheung	បឹងត្រាញ់ខាងជើង		Commune (ឃុំ Khum)	210701	9
2	Boeng Tranh Khang Tboung	បឹងត្រាញ់ខាងត្បូង		Commune (ឃុំ Khum)	210702	10
3	Cheung Kuon	ជើងគួន		Commune (ឃុំ Khum)	210703	11
4	Chumreah Pen	ជំរះពេន		Commune (ឃុំ Khum)	210704	19
5	Khvav	ខ្វាវ		Commune (ឃុំ Khum)	210705	18
6	Lumchang	លំចង់		Commune (ឃុំ Khum)	210706	10
7	Rovieng	រវៀង		Commune (ឃុំ Khum)	210707	23
8	Samraong	សំរោង		Commune (ឃុំ Khum)	210708	9
9	Soengh	សឹង្ហ		Commune (ឃុំ Khum)	210709	14
10	Sla	ស្លា		Commune (ឃុំ Khum)	210710	13
11	Trea	ទ្រា		Commune (ឃុំ Khum)	210711	11

=== Doun Kaev Municipality ===
Doun Kaev contains 3 Quarters (សង្កាត់ Sangkat) and 40 Villages (ភូមិ Phum).

#	Name	Khmer	UNGEGN	Administrative Unit	Geocode	# of Villages
1	Baray	បារាយណ៍		Quarter (សង្កាត់ Sangkat)	210801	14
2	Roka Knong	រកាក្នុង		Quarter (សង្កាត់ Sangkat)	210802	12
3	Roka Krau	រកាក្រៅ		Quarter (សង្កាត់ Sangkat)	210803	14

=== Tram Kak District ===
Tram Kak contains 15 Communes (ឃុំ Khum) and 244 Villages (ភូមិ Phum).

#	Name	Khmer	UNGEGN	Administrative Unit	Geocode	# of Villages
1	Angk Ta Saom	អង្គតាសោម		Commune (ឃុំ Khum)	210901	22
2	Cheang Tong	ជាងទង		Commune (ឃុំ Khum)	210902	16
3	Kus	គុស		Commune (ឃុំ Khum)	210903	30
4	Leay Bour	លាយបូរ		Commune (ឃុំ Khum)	210904	25
5	Nhaeng Nhang	ញ៉ែងញ៉ង		Commune (ឃុំ Khum)	210905	11
6	Ou Saray	អូរសារាយ		Commune (ឃុំ Khum)	210906	12
7	Trapeang Kranhoung	ត្រពាំងក្រញូង		Commune (ឃុំ Khum)	210907	9
8	Otdam Soriya	ឧត្ដមសុរិយា		Commune (ឃុំ Khum)	210908	14
9	Popel	ពពេល		Commune (ឃុំ Khum)	210909	12
10	Samraong	សំរោង		Commune (ឃុំ Khum)	210910	16
11	Srae Ronoung	ស្រែរនោង		Commune (ឃុំ Khum)	210911	17
12	Ta Phem	តាភេម		Commune (ឃុំ Khum)	210912	23
13	Tram Kak	ត្រាំកក់		Commune (ឃុំ Khum)	210913	13
14	Trapeang Thum Khang Cheung	ត្រពាំងធំខាងជើង		Commune (ឃុំ Khum)	210914	11
15	Trapeang Thum Khang Tboung	ត្រពាំងធំខាងត្បូង		Commune (ឃុំ Khum)	210915	13

=== Treang District ===
Treang contains 14 Communes (ឃុំ Khum) and 154 Villages (ភូមិ Phum).

#	Name	Khmer	UNGEGN	Administrative Unit	Geocode	# of Villages
1	Angkanh	អង្កាញ់		Commune (ឃុំ Khum)	211001	8
2	Angk Khnor	អង្គខ្នុរ		Commune (ឃុំ Khum)	211002	7
3	Chi Khma	ជីខ្មា		Commune (ឃុំ Khum)	211003	10
4	Khvav	ខ្វាវ		Commune (ឃុំ Khum)	211004	11
5	Prambei Mum	ប្រាំបីមុំ		Commune (ឃុំ Khum)	211005	12
6	Angk Kaev	អង្គកែវ		Commune (ឃុំ Khum)	211006	8
7	Prey Sloek	ព្រៃស្លឹក		Commune (ឃុំ Khum)	211007	17
8	Roneam	រនាម		Commune (ឃុំ Khum)	211008	11
9	Sambuor	សំបួរ		Commune (ឃុំ Khum)	211009	10
10	Sanlung	សន្លុង		Commune (ឃុំ Khum)	211010	12
11	Smaong	ស្មោង		Commune (ឃុំ Khum)	211011	5
12	Srangae	ស្រង៉ែ		Commune (ឃុំ Khum)	211012	15
13	Thlok	ធ្លក		Commune (ឃុំ Khum)	211013	18
14	Tralach	ត្រឡាច		Commune (ឃុំ Khum)	211014	10

== Oddar Meanchey Province ==
Oddar Meanchey contains 19 Communes (ឃុំ Khum), 5 Quarters (សង្កាត់ Sangkat) and 308 Villages (ភូមិ Phum).

=== Anlong Veaeng District ===
Anlong Veaeng contains 5 Communes (ឃុំ Khum) and 58 Villages (ភូមិ Phum).

#	Name	Khmer	UNGEGN	Administrative Unit	Geocode	# of Villages
1	Anlong Veaeng	អន្លង់វែង		Commune (ឃុំ Khum)	220101	16
2	Trapeang Tav	ត្រពាំងតាវ		Commune (ឃុំ Khum)	220103	10
3	Trapeang Prei	ត្រពាំងប្រីយ៍		Commune (ឃុំ Khum)	220104	13
4	Thlat	ថ្លាត		Commune (ឃុំ Khum)	220105	8
5	Lumtong	លំទង		Commune (ឃុំ Khum)	220106	11

=== Banteay Ampil District ===
Banteay Ampil contains 4 Communes (ឃុំ Khum) and 86 Villages (ភូមិ Phum).

#	Name	Khmer	UNGEGN	Administrative Unit	Geocode	# of Villages
1	Ampil	អំពិល		Commune (ឃុំ Khum)	220201	31
2	Beng	បេង		Commune (ឃុំ Khum)	220202	23
3	Kouk Khpos	គោកខ្ពស់		Commune (ឃុំ Khum)	220203	13
4	Kouk Mon	គោកមន		Commune (ឃុំ Khum)	220204	19

=== Chong Kal District ===
Chong Kal contains 4 Communes (ឃុំ Khum) and 35 Villages (ភូមិ Phum).

#	Name	Khmer	UNGEGN	Administrative Unit	Geocode	# of Villages
1	Cheung Tien	ជើងទៀន		Commune (ឃុំ Khum)	220301	7
2	Chong Kal	ចុងកាល់		Commune (ឃុំ Khum)	220302	10
3	Krasang	ក្រសាំង		Commune (ឃុំ Khum)	220303	10
4	Pongro	ពង្រ		Commune (ឃុំ Khum)	220304	8

=== Samraong Municipality ===
Samraong contains 5 Quarters (សង្កាត់ Sangkat) and 76 Villages (ភូមិ Phum).

#	Name	Khmer	UNGEGN	Administrative Unit	Geocode	# of Villages
1	Bansay Reak	បន្សាយរាក់		Quarter (សង្កាត់ Sangkat)	220401	8
2	Bos Sbov	បុស្បូវ		Quarter (សង្កាត់ Sangkat)	220402	9
3	Koun Kriel	កូនក្រៀល		Quarter (សង្កាត់ Sangkat)	220403	33
4	Samraong	សំរោង		Quarter (សង្កាត់ Sangkat)	220404	18
5	Ou Smach	អូរស្មាច់		Quarter (សង្កាត់ Sangkat)	220405	8

=== Trapeang Prasat District ===
Trapeang Prasat contains 6 Communes (ឃុំ Khum) and 53 Villages (ភូមិ Phum).

#	Name	Khmer	UNGEGN	Administrative Unit	Geocode	# of Villages
1	Bak Anloung	បាក់អន្លូង		Commune (ឃុំ Khum)	220501	6
2	Ph'av	ផ្អាវ		Commune (ឃុំ Khum)	220502	12
3	Ou Svay	អូរស្វាយ		Commune (ឃុំ Khum)	220503	7
4	Preah Pralay	ព្រះប្រឡាយ		Commune (ឃុំ Khum)	220504	7
5	Tumnob Dach	ទំនប់ដាច់		Commune (ឃុំ Khum)	220505	6
6	Trapeang Prasat	ត្រពាំងប្រាសាទ		Commune (ឃុំ Khum)	220506	15

== Kep Province ==
Kep contains 2 Communes (ឃុំ Khum), 3 Quarters (សង្កាត់ Sangkat) and 18 Villages (ភូមិ Phum).

=== Damnak Chang'aeur District ===
Damnak Chang'aeur contains 2 Communes (ឃុំ Khum) and 11 Villages (ភូមិ Phum).

#	Name	Khmer	UNGEGN	Administrative Unit	Geocode	# of Villages
1	Angkaol	អង្កោល		Commune (ឃុំ Khum)	230101	4
2	Pong Tuek	ពងទឹក		Commune (ឃុំ Khum)	230103	7

=== Kep Municipality ===
Kep contains 3 Quarters (សង្កាត់ Sangkat) and 7 Villages (ភូមិ Phum).

#	Name	Khmer	UNGEGN	Administrative Unit	Geocode	# of Villages
1	Kep	កែប		Quarter (សង្កាត់ Sangkat)	230201	2
2	Prey Thum	ព្រៃធំ		Quarter (សង្កាត់ Sangkat)	230202	3
3	Ou Krasar	អូរក្រសារ		Quarter (សង្កាត់ Sangkat)	230203	2

== Pailin Province ==
Pailin contains 4 Quarters (សង្កាត់ Sangkat), 4 Communes (ឃុំ Khum) and 92 Villages (ភូមិ Phum).

=== Pailin Municipality ===
Pailin contains 4 Quarters (សង្កាត់ Sangkat) and 41 Villages (ភូមិ Phum).

#	Name	Khmer	UNGEGN	Administrative Unit	Geocode	# of Villages
1	Pailin	ប៉ៃលិន		Quarter (សង្កាត់ Sangkat)	240101	13
2	Ou Ta Vau	អូរតាវ៉ៅ		Quarter (សង្កាត់ Sangkat)	240102	10
3	Tuol Lvea	ទួលល្វា		Quarter (សង្កាត់ Sangkat)	240103	11
4	Bar Yakha	បរយ៉ាខា		Quarter (សង្កាត់ Sangkat)	240104	7

=== Sala Krau District ===
Sala Krau contains 4 Communes (ឃុំ Khum) and 51 Villages (ភូមិ Phum).

#	Name	Khmer	UNGEGN	Administrative Unit	Geocode	# of Villages
1	Sala Krau	សាលាក្រៅ		Commune (ឃុំ Khum)	240201	8
2	Stueng Trang	ស្ទឹងត្រង់		Commune (ឃុំ Khum)	240202	16
3	Stueng Kach	ស្ទឹងកាច់		Commune (ឃុំ Khum)	240203	18
4	Ou Andoung	អូរអណ្ដូង		Commune (ឃុំ Khum)	240204	9

== Tboung Khmum Province ==
Tboung Khmum contains 62 Communes (ឃុំ Khum), 2 Quarters (សង្កាត់ Sangkat) and 875 Villages (ភូមិ Phum).

=== Dambae District ===
Dambae contains 7 Communes (ឃុំ Khum) and 83 Villages (ភូមិ Phum).

#	Name	Khmer	UNGEGN	Administrative Unit	Geocode	# of Villages
1	Chong Cheach	ចុងជាច		Commune (ឃុំ Khum)	250101	13
2	Dambae	តំបែរ		Commune (ឃុំ Khum)	250102	10
3	Kouk Srok	គោកស្រុក		Commune (ឃុំ Khum)	250103	9
4	Neang Teut	នាងទើត		Commune (ឃុំ Khum)	250104	5
5	Seda	សេដា		Commune (ឃុំ Khum)	250105	24
6	Trapeang Pring	ត្រពាំងព្រីង		Commune (ឃុំ Khum)	250106	12
7	Tuek Chrov	ទឹកជ្រៅ		Commune (ឃុំ Khum)	250107	10

=== Krouch Chhmar District ===
Krouch Chhmar contains 12 Communes (ឃុំ Khum) and 77 Villages (ភូមិ Phum).

#	Name	Khmer	UNGEGN	Administrative Unit	Geocode	# of Villages
1	Chhuk	ឈូក		Commune (ឃុំ Khum)	250201	8
2	Chumnik	ជំនីក		Commune (ឃុំ Khum)	250202	4
3	Kampong Treas	កំពង់ទ្រាស		Commune (ឃុំ Khum)	250203	6
4	Kaoh Pir	កោះពីរ		Commune (ឃុំ Khum)	250204	4
5	Krouch Chhmar	ក្រូចឆ្មារ		Commune (ឃុំ Khum)	250205	7
6	Peus Muoy	ប៉ឺស១		Commune (ឃុំ Khum)	250206	5
7	Peus Pir	ប៉ើស២		Commune (ឃុំ Khum)	250207	4
8	Preaek A chi	ព្រែកអាជី		Commune (ឃុំ Khum)	250208	6
9	Roka Khnor	រការខ្នុរ		Commune (ឃុំ Khum)	250209	7
10	Svay Khleang	ស្វាយឃ្លាំង		Commune (ឃុំ Khum)	250210	6
11	Trea	ទ្រា		Commune (ឃុំ Khum)	250211	8
12	Tuol Snuol	ទួលស្នួល		Commune (ឃុំ Khum)	250212	12

=== Memot District ===
Memot contains 14 Communes (ឃុំ Khum) and 182 Villages (ភូមិ Phum).

#	Name	Khmer	UNGEGN	Administrative Unit	Geocode	# of Villages
1	Chan Mul	ចាន់មូល		Commune (ឃុំ Khum)	250301	12
2	Choam	ជាំ		Commune (ឃុំ Khum)	250302	10
3	Choam Kravien	ជាំក្រវៀន		Commune (ឃុំ Khum)	250303	18
4	Choam Ta Mau	ជាំតាម៉ៅ		Commune (ឃុំ Khum)	250304	14
5	Dar	ដារ		Commune (ឃុំ Khum)	250305	21
6	Kampoan	កំពាន់		Commune (ឃុំ Khum)	250306	9
7	Kokir	គគីរ		Commune (ឃុំ Khum)	250307	8
8	Memong	មេមង		Commune (ឃុំ Khum)	250308	9
9	Memot	មេមត់		Commune (ឃុំ Khum)	250309	15
10	Rumchek	រំចេក		Commune (ឃុំ Khum)	250310	13
11	Rung	រូង		Commune (ឃុំ Khum)	250311	13
12	Tonlung	ទន្លូង		Commune (ឃុំ Khum)	250312	13
13	Tramung	ត្រមូង		Commune (ឃុំ Khum)	250313	20
14	Triek	ទ្រៀក		Commune (ឃុំ Khum)	250314	7

=== Ou Reang Ov District ===
Ou Reang Ov contains 7 Communes (ឃុំ Khum) and 142 Villages (ភូមិ Phum).

#	Name	Khmer	UNGEGN	Administrative Unit	Geocode	# of Villages
1	Ampil Ta Pok	អំពិលតាពក		Commune (ឃុំ Khum)	250401	24
2	Chak	ចក		Commune (ឃុំ Khum)	250402	17
3	Damril	ដំរិល		Commune (ឃុំ Khum)	250403	20
4	Kong Chey	គងជ័យ		Commune (ឃុំ Khum)	250404	22
5	Mien	មៀន		Commune (ឃុំ Khum)	250405	14
6	Preah Theat	ព្រះធាតុ		Commune (ឃុំ Khum)	250406	22
7	Tuol Souphi	ទួលសូភី		Commune (ឃុំ Khum)	250407	23

=== Ponhea Kraek District ===
Ponhea Kraek contains 8 Communes (ឃុំ Khum) and 150 Villages (ភូមិ Phum).

#	Name	Khmer	UNGEGN	Administrative Unit	Geocode	# of Villages
1	Dountei	ដូនតី		Commune (ឃុំ Khum)	250501	21
2	Kak	កក់		Commune (ឃុំ Khum)	250502	23
3	Kandaol Chrum	កណ្ដោលជ្រុំ		Commune (ឃុំ Khum)	250503	25
4	Kaong Kang	កោងកាង		Commune (ឃុំ Khum)	250504	16
5	Kraek	ក្រែក		Commune (ឃុំ Khum)	250505	33
6	Popel	ពពេល		Commune (ឃុំ Khum)	250506	10
7	Trapeang Phlong	ត្រពាំងផ្លុង		Commune (ឃុំ Khum)	250507	14
8	Veal Mlu	វាលម្លូរ		Commune (ឃុំ Khum)	250508	8

=== Suong Municipality ===
Suong contains 2 Quarters (សង្កាត់ Sangkat) and 30 Villages (ភូមិ Phum).

#	Name	Khmer	UNGEGN	Administrative Unit	Geocode	# of Villages
1	Suong	សួង	Suŏng	Quarter (សង្កាត់ Sangkat)	250601	15
2	Vihear Luong	វិហារលួង		Quarter (សង្កាត់ Sangkat)	250602	15

=== Tboung Khmum District ===
Tboung Khmum contains 14 Communes (ឃុំ Khum) and 211 Villages (ភូមិ Phum).

#	Name	Khmer	UNGEGN	Administrative Unit	Geocode	# of Villages
1	Anhchaeum	អញ្ចើម		Commune (ឃុំ Khum)	250701	22
2	Boeng Pruol	បឹងព្រួល		Commune (ឃុំ Khum)	250702	11
3	Chikor	ជីគរ		Commune (ឃុំ Khum)	250703	19
4	Chirou Ti Muoy	ជីរោទ៍ ទី១		Commune (ឃុំ Khum)	250704	9
5	Chirou Ti Pir	ជីរោទ៍ ទី២		Commune (ឃុំ Khum)	250705	12
6	Chob	ជប់		Commune (ឃុំ Khum)	250706	16
7	Kor	គរ		Commune (ឃុំ Khum)	250707	20
8	Lngieng	ល្ងៀង		Commune (ឃុំ Khum)	250708	9
9	Mong Riev	មង់រៀវ		Commune (ឃុំ Khum)	250709	11
10	Peam Chileang	ពាមជីលាំង		Commune (ឃុំ Khum)	250710	11
11	Roka Po Pram	រកាពប្រាំ		Commune (ឃុំ Khum)	250711	21
12	Sralab	ស្រឡប់		Commune (ឃុំ Khum)	250712	20
13	Thma Pech	ថ្មពេជ្រ		Commune (ឃុំ Khum)	250713	15
14	Tonle Bet	ទន្លេបិទ		Commune (ឃុំ Khum)	250714	15
