= Phnom Chisor =

Phnom Chisor (Chiso)
- ភ្នំជីសូរ
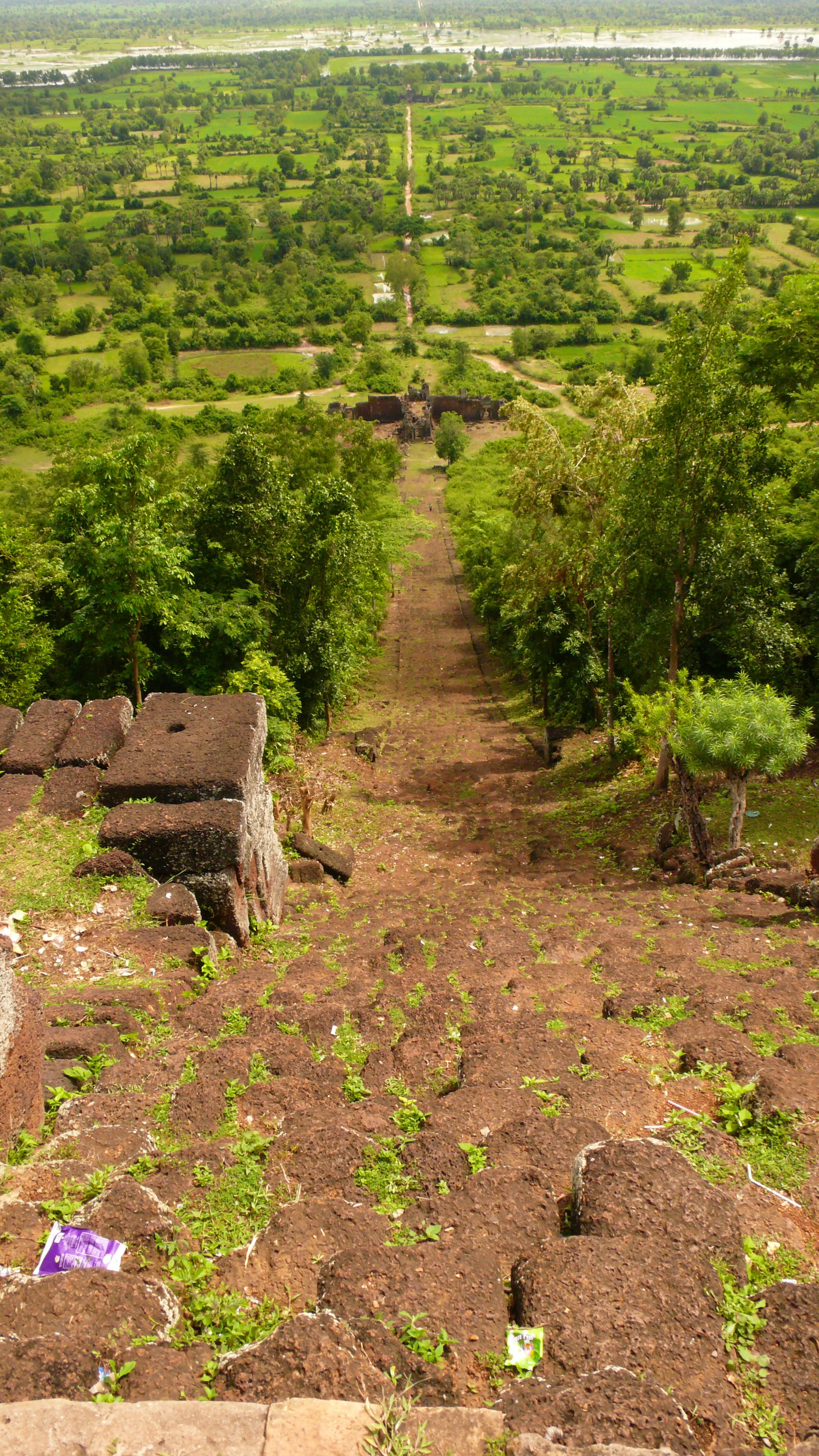
- Central sanctuary of Phnom Chisor temple

- Location in Cambodia

Religion
- Affiliation: Hinduism and Buddhism
- District: Samraŏng
- Province: Takéo
- Deity: Shiva, Vishnu, and Brahman

Location
- Country: Cambodia
- Coordinates: 11°11′4″N 104°49′24″E

Architecture
- Type: Angkorian style of Khmer architecture
- Creator: King Suryavarman I (1002-1050 AD)
- Completed: 11th century

Specifications
- Temple: Six (largest is central temple) with 5 secondary temples
- Inscriptions: K. 31 – in situ, doorframe north edicule featuring 13 lines in Khmer dating to 941 K. 32 – a stele that is now located in the Angkor National Museum featuring 10 lines in Sanskrit, 10 lines in Khmer and 1 line in Sanskrit across its sides K. 33 – a stele that is in the Guimet Museum featuring 10 lines in Khmer K. 34 – a stele that is in the Guimet Museum featuring 16 lines in Sanskrit, 2 lines in Khmer, 31 lines in Khmer, and 2 lines in Khmer across its sides
- Elevation: 133 m (436 ft)

Phnom Chisor (Khmer: ភ្នំជីសូរ, Phnum Chisor [pʰnom djee-saw]; "Chisor Mountain") is a mountain that stands at 133-metres tall within Dok Por village, of Rovieng commune, Samraŏng District, Takéo Province, Cambodia. It lies about 42 km south of Phnom Penh (modern and colonial capital of Cambodia since 1866) and 27 km north of The town of Takeo or lesser known as Doun Kaev. The Ministry of Culture and Fine Art are preparing documents to nominate the site in the list of UNESCO world heritage, yet currently is not on the list as of now.

== Temple: Prasat Phnom Chisor ==
On top of Chisor Mountain lies an ancient structure researchers call Prasat Phnom Chisor or Sri Suryaparvata (or Suyagiri), which was roughly translated to Mountain of the sun. The temple was constructed by Suryavarman 1, the King of the Khmer Empire, or Angkor, and was a Monarch who practiced Brahmanism. Phnom Chisor was dedicated to Shiva and partly to Vishnu which is a reference to Phnom Chisor's founder Suryavarman 1 and his tolerance to local Vishnu cults. The word "Surya" in King Suryavarman 1's name is simply the Sanskrit word for the Sun god in Hinduism or the sun.

Standing at 60 metres long, and 50 metres wide, made of a mix of sandstones and other stones, The temple Phnom Chisor is one of few that were built on a mountain. spanning nearly 400 metres with approximately 610 steps, the stairs are currently in need of repairs, yet still accessible to the people. surrounded by 2 galleries, the first measures about 60 metres each side, the second smaller, and located in the centre, and the central gallery appears to be the primary worship area. There are still religious Reliefs that depict Brahma, Shiva, and Vishnu, carved into some sandstone lintels. Tour agencies claim that there are 6 Brick temples with the central temple being the largest, and separately there are supposedly 5 secondary temples to the east, and 2 libraries that are to the west all enclosed in a laterite enclosed wall. The Pagoda was rebuilt in 1917 (French Indochina) but destroyed again amidst the Vietnam war during the 1970s, however it was rebuilt again in 1979.

1. Sen Nimol Temple (Khmer: ប្រាសាទសែននិមល(?)): now heavily overgrown and decayed, situated just below the mountain, some lintels have been spared yet the temple is not in use.
2. Sen Roveang Temple (Khmer: ប្រាសាទសែនរវាំង or សែនភូវាំង): a building that appears to be on its last legs at first is used as a Buddhist sanctuary with a reclining buddha housed inside and is about 800m from Sen Nimol Temple

The site is mainly in use today as a place of pilgrimage and veneration of Buddhism, as well as tourism, yet is still religiously important to both Brahman worshipers and Buddhists. In front of the temple the steps connect Phnom Chisor to Sen Chhmos temple, Sen Phouvang temple, and Tonle Om lake which is incredibly sacred to Brahmans, and considered to have the ability to wash away their sins.

=== Historical Context: Suryavarman I ===
Suryavarman 1's motive for the construction of Phnom Chisor was probably one of control. The Mekong Delta area is situated nearby to Phnom Chiso, and this was where the Khmer civilisation appeared during the Funan period. being aware of Suryavarman 1's historical lineage of kings that date back to Chenla, and Funan, The King was probably trying to emphasize the link to the area in order to cement his control of the population and area for the Angkorian Empire and support his empire building and expansion of territories. Suryavarman 1 who rained from 1002 to 1050 AD, known as a conqueror from the beginning of his reign, and defeated King Udayadityavarman by 1002 AD and then Jayaviravarman who was of Malay origin by 1010 AD to secure his throne. He was known to not only found the construction of temples, but also water irrigation and developing the site of the traditional Angkor capital. Ta keo, a 7-8 hour drive from Phnom Chisor is another example of temple founded by Jayavarman V, yet said to be unfinished until Suryavarman 1 continued its construction, which would have been another ploy to attain support for his regime. Ta keo (Khmer: តាកែវ "Takaeoo") is known as the "tower of crystal", and was dedicated to Shiva and originally stopped after a thunderstrike hit the structure causing the people to believe in a bad omen. No structural changes were made, and the previous plans were followed by Suryavarman, making archaeologists believe that the king only wanted to finish what other king's could not finish and diminish any thought or rumour of bad luck as he was the "Sun King" and powerful ruler in the minds of his Subjects. Therefor there are clear motives behind each construction finished or started by King Suryavarman 1 of the Khmer empire like Phnom Chisor, and those were of expansion and control of existing and new territories, which is highly politically important for the long and stable reign Suryavarman held until his death.

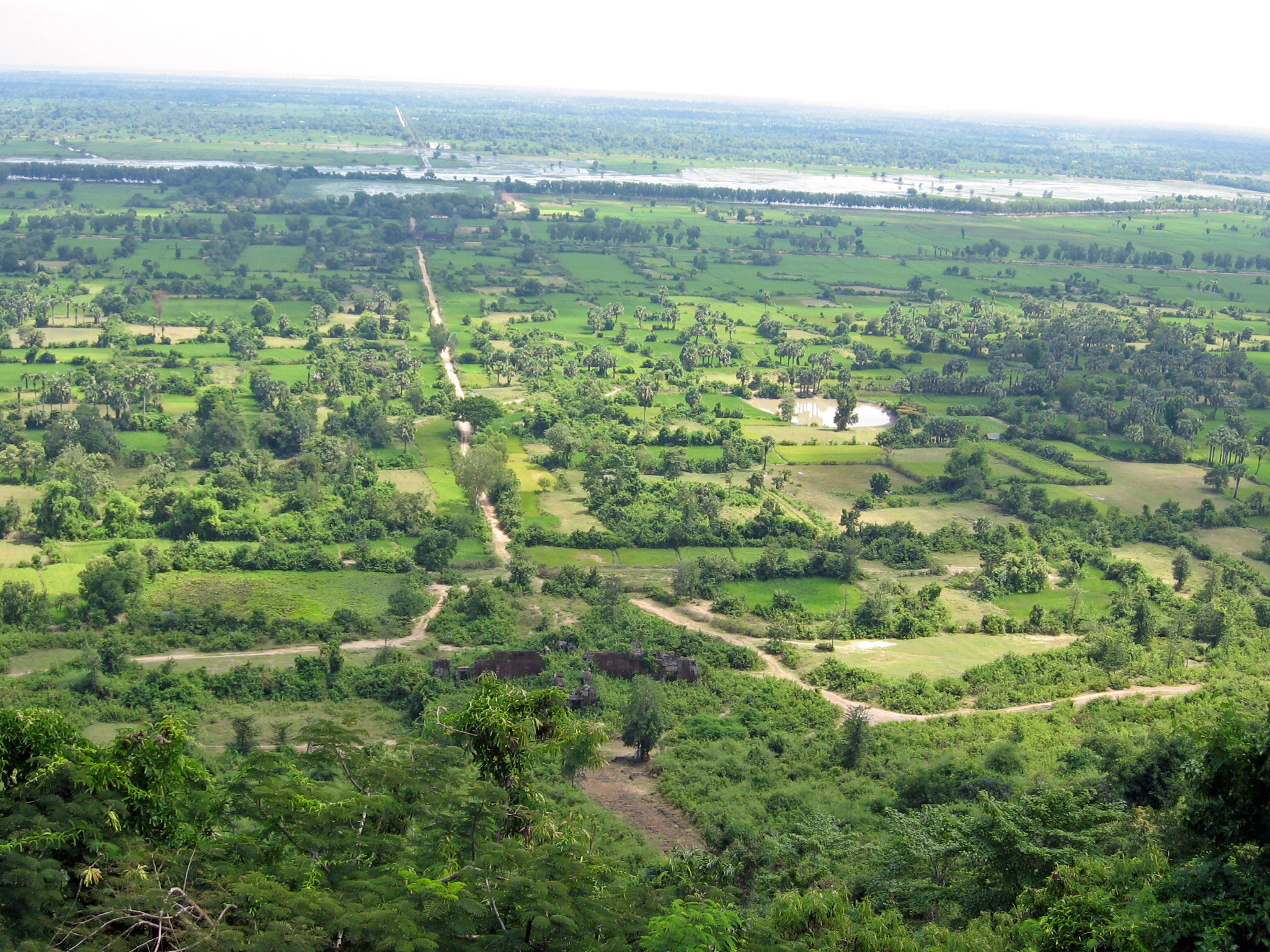
Phnom Chisor geography

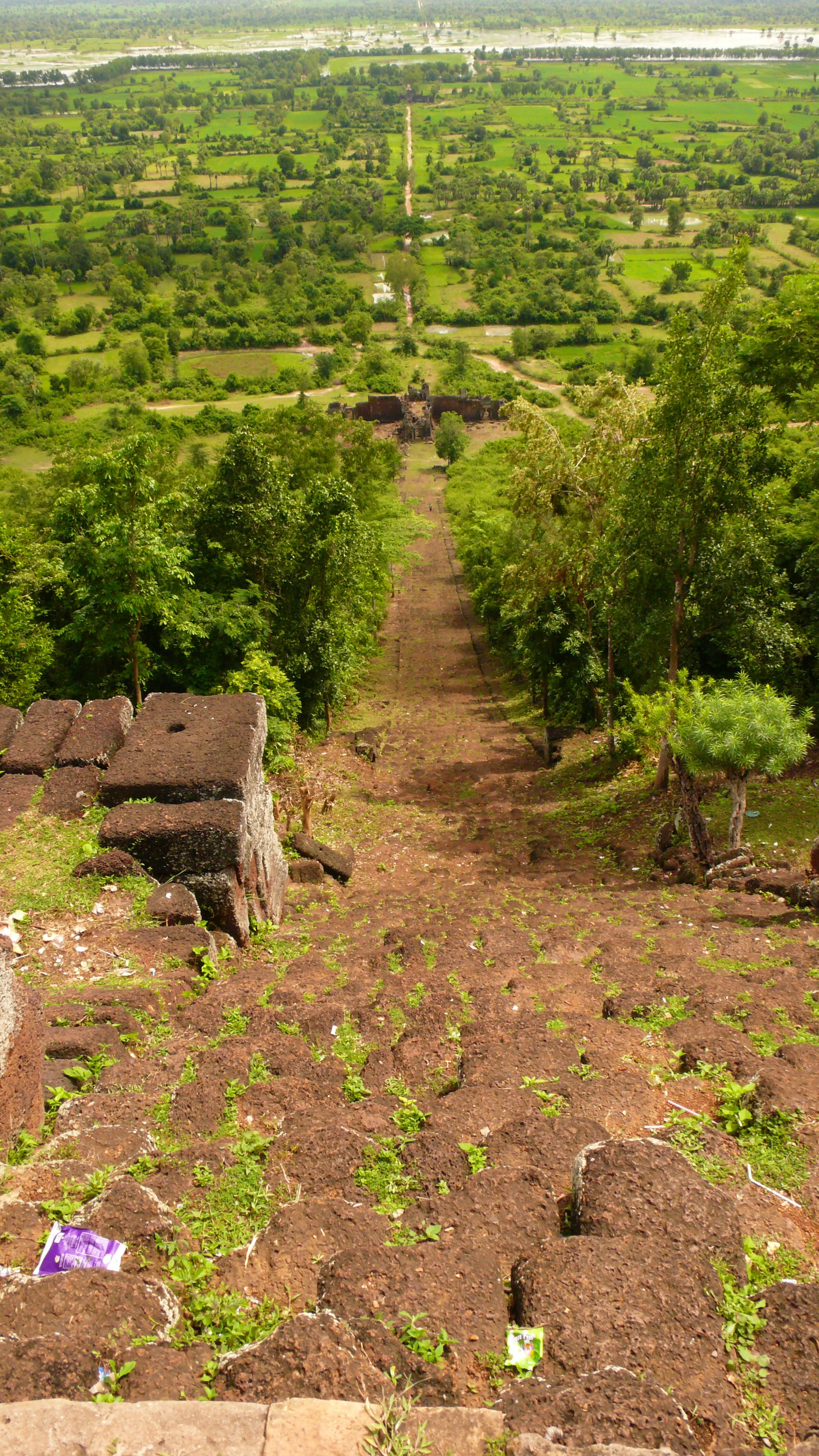
Stairs leading up Phnom Chisor
