= Doung Khpos Commune =

Doung Khpos ឃុំដូងខ្ពស់
- Commune (Khum)
- Location within Cambodia
- Coordinates: 10°51′20″N 104°53′02″E
- Country: Cambodia
- Province: Takéo
- District: Bourei Cholsar
- Time zone: UTC+7
- Geocode: 210303

Doung Khpos Commune (Khmer: ឃុំដូងខ្ពស់) is a khum (commune) in Bourei Cholsar District, Takéo Province, Cambodia.

== Administration ==
As of 2019, Doung Khpos Commune has 12 phums (villages) as follows.

No.	Code	Village	Khmer
1	21030301	Ta Sai	តាសៃ
2	21030302	Souphi	សូភី
3	21030303	Roteh Phluk	រទេះភ្លូក
4	21030304	Trapeang Tonle	ត្រពាំងទន្លេ
5	21030305	Ach Tonsay	អាចម៍ទន្សាយ
6	21030306	Doung Khpos	ដូងខ្ពស់
7	21030307	Ta Ros	តារស់
8	21030308	Ta Yueng	តាយឹង
9	21030309	Traeuy Khlouk	ត្រើយឃ្លោក
10	21030310	Angkanh	អង្កាញ់
11	21030311	Chrey Ngouk	ជ្រៃងោក
12	21030312	Prey Mlob	ព្រៃម្លប់
