= Prey Yuthka Commune =

Prey Yuthka ឃុំព្រៃយុថ្កា
- Commune (Khum)
- Location within Cambodia
- Coordinates: 10°40′38″N 104°58′41″E
- Country: Cambodia
- Province: Takéo
- District: Kaoh Andaet
- Time zone: UTC+7
- Geocode: 210504

Prey Yuthka Commune (Khmer: ឃុំព្រៃយុថ្កា) is a khum (commune) in Kaoh Andaet District, Takéo Province, Cambodia.

== Administration ==
As of 2019, Prey Yuthka Commune has 6 phums (villages) as follows.

No.	Code	Village	Khmer
1	21050401	Ta Nhuem	តាញឹម
2	21050402	Prey Bay	ព្រៃបាយ
3	21050403	Ta Phin	តាភិន
4	21050404	Ta Phan	តាផាន់
5	21050405	Ta Hien	តាហៀន
6	21050406	Pong Andaeuk	ពងអណ្ដើក
