= Bourei Cholsar Commune =

Bourei Cholsar ឃុំបូរីជលសារ
- Commune (Khum)
- Location within Cambodia
- Coordinates: 10°50′34″N 104°59′41″E
- Country: Cambodia
- Province: Takéo
- District: Bourei Cholsar
- Time zone: UTC+7
- Geocode: 210301

Bourei Cholsar Commune (Khmer: ឃុំបូរីជលសារ) is a khum (commune) in Bourei Cholsar District, Takéo Province, Cambodia.

== Administration ==
As of 2019, Bourei Cholsar Commune has 7 phums (villages) as follows.

No.	Code	Village	Khmer
1	21030101	Angk Krouch	អង្គក្រូច
2	21030102	Snay Duoch	ស្នាយដួច
3	21030103	Kampong Ampil	កំពង់អំពិល
4	21030104	Anlong Tien	អន្លង់ទៀន
5	21030105	K'aek Yum	ក្អែកយំ
6	21030106	Daeum Kor	ដើមគរ
7	21030107	Prek Khsach (Preaek ~)	ព្រែកខ្សាច់
