= Kouk Pou Commune =

Kouk Pou ឃុំគោកពោធិ៍
- Commune (Khum)
- Location within Cambodia
- Coordinates: 10°53′43″N 104°55′49″E
- Country: Cambodia
- Province: Takéo
- District: Bourei Cholsar
- Time zone: UTC+7
- Geocode: 210305

Kouk Pou Commune (Khmer: ឃុំគោកពោធិ៍) is a khum (commune) in Bourei Cholsar District, Takéo Province, Cambodia.

== Administration ==
As of 2019, Kouk Pou Commune has 8 phums (villages) as follows.

| No. | Code | Village | Khmer |
|---|---|---|---|
| 1 | 21030501 | Kandaol | កណ្ដោល |
| 2 | 21030502 | Pong Tuek | ពងទឹក |
| 3 | 21030503 | Chrey Kouk Pou | ជ្រៃគោកពោធិ៍ |
| 4 | 21030504 | Prey Mul | ព្រៃមូល |
| 5 | 21030505 | Prey Hiev | ព្រៃហៀវ |
| 6 | 21030506 | Neak Ta Tbal | អ្នកតាត្បាល់ |
| 7 | 21030507 | Kampong Youl | កំពង់យោល |
| 8 | 21030508 | Thma Sa | ថ្មស |
