= Romenh Commune =

Romenh ឃុំរមេញ
- Commune (Khum)
- Location within Cambodia
- Coordinates: 10°47′42″N 104°56′55″E
- Country: Cambodia
- Province: Takéo
- District: Kaoh Andaet
- Time zone: UTC+7
- Geocode: 210505

Romenh Commune (Khmer: ឃុំរមេញ) is a khum (commune) in Kaoh Andaet District, Takéo Province, Cambodia.

== Administration ==
As of 2019, Romenh Commune has 10 phums (villages) as follows.

No.	Code	Village	Khmer
1	21050501	Romenh Khang Tboung	រមេញខាងត្បូង
2	21050502	Romenh Khang Cheung	រមេញខាងជើង
3	21050503	Daeum Chan	ដើមចាន់
4	21050504	Mea Neak	មានាគ
5	21050505	Daeum Krouch	ដើមក្រូច
6	21050506	Pralay Meas	ប្រឡាយមាស
7	21050507	Chambak Aem	ចំបក់ឯម
8	21050508	Samraong	សំរោង
9	21050509	Prasat	ប្រាសាទ
10	21050510	Daeum Pou	ដើមពោធិ
