= Lumchang Commune =

Lumchang ឃុំលំចង់
- Commune (Khum)
- Location within Cambodia
- Coordinates: 11°03′06″N 104°46′10″E
- Country: Cambodia
- Province: Takéo
- District: Samraŏng
- Time zone: UTC+7
- Geocode: 210706

Lumchang Commune (Khmer: ឃុំលំចង់) is a khum (commune) in Samraŏng District, Takéo Province, Cambodia.

== Administration ==
As of 2019, Lumchang Commune has 10 phums (villages) as follows.

No.	Code	Village	Khmer
1	21070601	Lumchang	លំចង់
2	21070602	Svay Prey	ស្វាយព្រៃ
3	21070603	Pong Tuek	ពងទឹក
4	21070604	Kdol	ក្ដុល
5	21070605	Thoammeaney	ធម្មន័យ
6	21070606	Tuol Trea	ទួលទ្រា
7	21070607	Ta Mung	តាមូង
8	21070608	Rung	រូង
9	21070609	Khvav	ខ្វាវ
10	21070610	Prasiet	ប្រសៀត
