= Champa Commune =

Khum (commune) in Takeo Province, Cambodia

Champa ឃុំចំប៉ា
- Commune (Khum)
- Location within Cambodia
- Coordinates: 11°08′19″N 104°54′24″E
- Country: Cambodia
- Province: Takéo
- District: Prey Kabbas
- Time zone: UTC+7
- Geocode: 210603

Champa Commune (Khmer: ឃុំចំប៉ា) is a khum (commune) in Prey Kabbas District, Takéo Province, Cambodia.

== Administration ==
As of 2019, Champa Commune has 9 phums (villages) as follows.

No.	Code	Village	Khmer
1	21060301	Ponsang	ពន្សាំង
2	21060302	Ruessei Thmei	ឫស្សីថ្មី
3	21060303	Chroy	ជ្រយ
4	21060304	Chumpu Proeks	ជម្ពូព្រឹក្ស
5	21060305	Champa	ចំប៉ា
6	21060306	Samraong	សំរោង
7	21060307	Danghoet	ដង្ហឹត
8	21060308	Chek	ចេក
9	21060309	Roneam Pechr	រនាមពេជ្រ
