= Komar Reachea Commune =

Komar Reachea ឃុំកុមាររាជា
- Commune (Khum)
- Location within Cambodia
- Coordinates: 11°15′46″N 104°44′07″E
- Country: Cambodia
- Province: Takéo
- District: Bati
- Time zone: UTC+7
- Geocode: 210205

Komar Reachea Commune (Khmer: ឃុំកុមាររាជា) is a khum (commune) in Bati District, Takéo Province, Cambodia.

== Administration ==
As of 2019, Komar Reachea Commune has 13 phums (villages) as follows.

No.	Code	Village	Khmer
1	21020501	Prey Khla	ព្រៃខ្លា
2	21020502	Trapeang Phlong	ត្រពាំងផ្លុង
3	21020503	Serei Mean Chouk	សិរីមានជោគ
4	21020504	Tramung Chrum	ត្រមូងជ្រុំ
5	21020505	Krang Pongro	ក្រាំងពង្រ
6	21020506	Royak	រយ៉ក
7	21020507	Sdok	ស្ដុក
8	21020508	Chbar Mon	ច្បារមន
9	21020509	Thmei	ថ្មី
10	21020510	Khnar Tong	ខ្នារទង់
11	21020511	Prey Slaeng	ព្រៃស្លែង
12	21020512	Kanhchang	កញ្ចាង
13	21020513	Kanhchum	កញ្ជុំ
