= Preah Bat Choan Chum Commune =

Preah Bat Choan Chum ឃុំព្រះបាទជាន់ជុំ
- Commune (Khum)
- Location within Cambodia
- Coordinates: 10°38′39″N 104°52′17″E
- Country: Cambodia
- Province: Takéo
- District: Kiri Vong
- Time zone: UTC+7
- Geocode: 210402

Preah Bat Choan Chum Commune (Khmer: ឃុំព្រះបាទជាន់ជុំ) is a khum (commune), in Kiri Vong District, Takéo Province, Cambodia.

== Villages ==
As of 2019, Preah Bat Choan Chum Commune has 9 phums (villages) as follows.

No.	Code	Village	Khmer
1	21040201	Pou Khvet	ពោធិ៍ខ្វិត
2	21040202	Kampong	កំពង់
3	21040203	Trapeang Srang	ត្រពាំងស្រង់
4	21040204	Traeuy Tonloab	ត្រើយទន្លាប់
5	21040205	Prey Thum	ព្រៃធំ
6	21040206	Pou Roung	ពោធិ៍រោង
7	21040207	Chrouy	ជ្រោយ
8	21040208	Pou	ពោធិ៍
9	21040209	Kampong Thmei	កំពង់ថ្មី
