= Trapeang Sab Commune =

Trapeang Sab ឃុំត្រពាំងសាប
- Commune (Khum)
- Location within Cambodia
- Coordinates: 11°16′21″N 104°47′56″E
- Country: Cambodia
- Province: Takéo
- District: Bati
- Time zone: UTC+7
- Geocode: 210215

Trapeang Sab Commune (Khmer: ឃុំត្រពាំងសាប) is a khum (commune) in Bati District, Takéo Province, Cambodia.

== Administration ==
As of 2019, Trapeang Sab Commune has 16 phums (villages) as follows.

No.	Code	Village	Khmer
1	21021501	Pun Phnum	ពូនភ្នំ
2	21021503	Trapeang Tuem	ត្រពាំងទឹម
3	21021504	Roka Khpos	រកាខ្ពស់
4	21021505	Khsach Lob	ខ្សាច់លប់
5	21021506	Roleang Kreul	រលាំងគ្រើល
6	21021507	Chak	ចក
7	21021508	Trapeang Sab	ត្រពាំងសាប
8	21021509	Ta Su	តាស៊ូ
9	21021510	Sangkae	សង្កែ
10	21021511	Smau Khnhei	ស្មៅខ្ញី
11	21021512	A Cheang	អាជាំង
12	21021513	Prech	ព្រេច
13	21021514	Sdok Prei	ស្ដុកប្រីយ៍
14	21021515	Daeum Kray	ដើមក្រាយ
15	21021516	Trakiet	ត្រគៀត
