= Thlok Commune (Treang District) =

Thlok ឃុំធ្លក
- Commune (Khum)
- Location within Cambodia
- Coordinates: 10°54′36″N 104°49′20″E
- Country: Cambodia
- Province: Takéo
- District: Treang
- Time zone: UTC+7
- Geocode: 211013

Thlok (Khmer: ឃុំធ្លក) is a khum (commune) in Treang District, Takéo Province, Cambodia.

== Administration ==
The commune contains 18 phums (villages) as follows.

No	Code	Village	Khmer	Notes
1	21101301	Tropeang Sla	ត្រពាំងស្លា	
2	21101302	Rovieng	រវៀង	
3	21101303	Svay	ស្វាយ	
4	21101304	Kraing Thum	ក្រាំងធំ	
5	21101305	Kreang Dai	គ្រាំងដៃ	
6	21101306	Chen	ចិន	
7	21101307	Prey Veng	ព្រៃវែង	
8	21101308	Chheu Teal Bak	ឈើទាលបាក់	
9	21101309	Prey Chheu Teal	ព្រៃឈើទាល	
10	21101310	Kreang Tauch	គ្រាំងតូច	
11	21101311	Kdei Tnaot	ក្ដីត្នោត	
12	21101312	Samraong	សំរោង	
13	21101313	Samno Khmau	សំណខ្មៅ	
14	21101314	Kreang Thnong	គ្រាំងធ្នង់	
15	21101315	Kreang Raung	គ្រាំងរោង	
16	21101316	Ponley	ពន្លៃ	
17	21101317	Lve	ល្វេ	
18	21101318	Chrung Kris	ជ្រុងគ្រីស	
