= Chumreah Pen Commune =

Chumreah Pen ឃុំជំរះពេន
- Commune (Khum)
- Location within Cambodia
- Coordinates: 11°10′18″N 104°45′36″E
- Country: Cambodia
- Province: Takéo
- District: Samraŏng
- Time zone: UTC+7
- Geocode: 210704

Chumreah Pen Commune (Khmer: ឃុំជំរះពេន) is a khum (commune) in Samraŏng District, Takéo Province, Cambodia.

== Administration ==
As of 2019, Chumreah Pen Commune has 19 phums (villages) as follows.

No.	Code	Village	Khmer
1	21070401	Srae Ta Sokh	ស្រែតាសុខ
2	21070402	Svay Ron	ស្វាយរន្ធ
3	21070403	Thlok Damnak Luong	ធ្លកដំណាក់ហ្លួង
4	21070404	Tramaeng	ត្រមែង
5	21070405	Damnak Trayueng	ដំណាក់ត្រយឹង
6	21070406	Ta Yueng	តាយឹង
7	21070407	Prey Khla	ព្រៃខ្លា
8	21070408	Ponlueu	ពន្លឺ
9	21070409	Kansaom Khlaeng	កន្សោមក្លែង
10	21070410	Trapeang Khnar	ត្រពាំងខ្នារ
11	21070411	Angkor Phdiek	អង្គរផ្ដៀក
12	21070412	Chumreah Pen	ជំរះពេន
13	21070413	Slaeng	ស្លែង
14	21070414	Trapeang Rumduol	ត្រពាំងរំដួល
15	21070415	Boeng	បឹង
16	21070416	Trapeang Chambak	ត្រពាំងចំបក់
17	21070417	Prey Neang Puon	ព្រៃនាងពួន
18	21070418	Snaeng Romeang	ស្នែងរមាំង
19	21070419	Prey Snuol	ព្រៃស្នួល
