= Sangkat Roka Krau =

Roka Krau សង្កាត់រកាក្រៅ
- Sangkat
- Location within Cambodia
- Coordinates: 10°58′04″N 104°46′37″E
- Country: Cambodia
- Province: Takéo
- Municipality: Doun Kaev
- Time zone: UTC+7
- Geocode: 210803

Sangkat Roka Krau (Khmer: សង្កាត់រកាក្រៅ) is a sangkat (quarter) in Doun Kaev Municipality, Takéo Province, Cambodia.

== Administration ==
As of 2019, Sangkat Roka Krau has 14 phums (villages) as follows.

No.	Code	Village	Khmer
1	21080301	Tumnob	ទំនប់
2	21080302	Tram	ត្រាំ
3	21080303	Prohut	ព្រហ៊ូត
4	21080304	Ta Du	តាឌូ
5	21080305	Thnal Baek	ថ្នល់បែក
6	21080306	Thmei	ថ្មី
7	21080307	Trapeang Sala	ត្រពាំងសាលា
8	21080308	Ben Mau	បិនម៉ៅ
9	21080309	Sour Chant	សូរ្យច័ន្ទ
10	21080310	Trapeang Phlong	ត្រពាំងផ្លុង
11	21080311	Prech	ព្រេច
12	21080312	Tom	តុំ
13	21080313	Thnong	ធ្នង់
14	21080314	Trapeang Angk	ត្រពាំងអង្គ
