= Soengh Commune (Samraong District) =

Soengh ឃុំសឹង្ហ
- Commune (Khum)
- Location within Cambodia
- Coordinates: 11°05′31″N 104°47′31″E
- Country: Cambodia
- Province: Takéo
- District: Samraŏng
- Time zone: UTC+7
- Geocode: 210709

Soengh Commune (Khmer: ឃុំសឹង្ហ) is a khum (commune) in Samraŏng District, Takéo Province, Cambodia.

== Administration ==
As of 2019, Soengh Commune has 14 phums (villages) as follows.

No.	Code	Village	Khmer
1	21070901	Chhuk Sa Khang Cheung	ឈូកសខាងជើង
2	21070902	Chhuk Sa Khang Tboung	ឈូកសខាងត្បូង
3	21070903	Kdei	ក្ដី
4	21070904	Prey Khla	ព្រៃខ្លា
5	21070905	Trapeang Kei	ត្រពាំងកី
6	21070906	Veng (Veaeng)	វែង
7	21070907	Tonloab	ទន្លាប់
8	21070908	Pa Na	ប៉ាណា
9	21070909	Kay Bang	កាយបាំង
10	21070910	Krang Traeng	ក្រាំងត្រែង
11	21070911	Soengh	សឹង្ហ
12	21070912	Trapeang Prei	ត្រពាំងប្រីយ៍
13	21070913	Angk Kdei	អង្គក្ដី
14	21070914	Krang Sdau	ក្រាំងស្ដៅ
