= Prey Sloek Commune =

Prey Sloek ឃុំព្រៃស្លឹក
- Commune (Khum)
- Location within Cambodia
- Coordinates: 10°53′56″N 104°46′54″E
- Country: Cambodia
- Province: Takéo
- District: Treang
- Time zone: UTC+7
- Geocode: 211007

Prey Sloek (Khmer: ឃុំព្រៃស្លឹក) is a khum (commune) in Treang District, Takéo Province, Cambodia.

== Administration ==
The commune contains 17 phums (villages) as follows.

No	Code	Village	Khmer	Notes
1	21100701	Prey Sandek	ព្រៃសណ្ដែក	
2	21100702	Srae Chrok	ស្រែច្រក	
3	21100703	Kauk Nhoar	គោកញ័រ	
4	21100704	Niel	នៀល	
5	21100705	Prey Mien	ព្រៃមៀន	
6	21100706	Prey Sloek	ព្រៃស្លឹក	
7	21100707	Phnum Thnok	ភ្នំថ្នក់	
8	21100708	Deum Phdiek	ដើមផ្ដៀក	
9	21100709	Tropeang Ta Moung	ត្រពាំងតាមូង	
10	21100710	Baray	បារាយណ៍	
11	21100711	Tropeang Veng	ត្រពាំងវែង	
12	21100712	Svay Rumdeng	ស្វាយរំដេង	
13	21100713	Phnum Khleng	ភ្នំខ្លែង	
14	21100714	Tropeang Angk	ត្រពាំងអង្គ	
15	21100715	Sangha	សង្ហា	
16	21100716	Samraong Mean Chey	សំរោងមានជ័យ	
17	21100717	So Chan	សូចាន់	
