= Pou Rumchak Commune =

Pou Rumchak ឃុំពោធិ៍រំចាក
- Commune (Khum)
- Location within Cambodia
- Coordinates: 11°06′56″N 104°56′51″E
- Country: Cambodia
- Province: Takéo
- District: Prey Kabbas
- Time zone: UTC+7
- Geocode: 210608

Pou Rumchak Commune (Khmer: ឃុំពោធិ៍រំចាក) is a khum (commune) in Prey Kabbas District, Takéo Province, Cambodia.

== Administration ==
As of 2019, Pou Rumchak Commune has 11 phums (villages) as follows.

No.	Code	Village	Khmer
1	21060801	Kdei Ta Hok	ក្ដីតាហុក
2	21060802	Thnal Bat	ថ្នល់បត់
3	21060803	Svay Samraong	ស្វាយសំរោង
4	21060804	Angk Sangkae	អង្គសង្កែ
5	21060805	Krasang	ក្រសាំង
6	21060806	Prey Ta Pong	ព្រៃតាពង
7	21060807	Kouk Angkong	គោកអង្គង់
8	21060808	Sama Leav	សម៉លាវ
9	21060809	Sama Khmer	សម៉ខ្មែរ
10	21060810	Kor	គរ
11	21060811	Kouk Kanhchab	គោកកញ្ចាប
