= Kamnab Commune =

Kamnab ឃុំកំណប់
- Commune (Khum)
- Location within Cambodia
- Coordinates: 10°38′28″N 104°55′36″E
- Country: Cambodia
- Province: Takéo
- District: Kiri Vong
- Time zone: UTC+7
- Geocode: 210403

Kamnab Commune (Khmer: ឃុំកំណប់) is a khum (commune) in Kiri Vong District, Takéo Province, Cambodia.

== Administration ==
As of 2019, Kamnab Commune has 6 phums (villages) as follows.

No.	Code	Village	Khmer
1	21040301	Kamnab	កំណប់
2	21040302	Krangol	ក្រងុល
3	21040303	Daeum Slaeng	ដើមស្លែង
4	21040304	Khmal	ខ្មល់
5	21040305	Pou Sangkae	ពោធិ៍សង្កែ
6	21040306	Chamkar Tieb	ចំការទៀប
