= Angk Prasat Commune =

Angk Prasat ឃុំអង្គប្រាសាទ
- Commune (Khum)
- Location within Cambodia
- Coordinates: 10°44′57″N 104°47′52″E
- Country: Cambodia
- Province: Takéo
- District: Kiri Vong
- Time zone: UTC+7
- Geocode: 210401

Angk Prasat Commune (Khmer: ឃុំអង្គប្រាសាទ) is a khum (commune) in Kiri Vong District, Takéo Province, Cambodia.

== Administration ==
As of 2019, Angk Prasat Commune has 10 phums (villages) as follows.

No.	Code	Village	Khmer
1	21040101	Pou Ta Mok	ពោធិ៍តាម៉ុក
2	21040102	Roneam Tnaot	រនាមត្នោត
3	21040103	Prachreay	ប្រជ្រាយ
4	21040104	Angk Prasat	អង្គប្រាសាទ
5	21040105	Phngeas	ភ្ងាស
6	21040106	Voat Svay	វត្ដស្វាយ
7	21040107	Phnum Lonteah	ភ្នំលន្ទះ
8	21040108	Tuol Svay	ទួលស្វាយ
9	21040109	Svay Thum	ស្វាយធំ
10	21040110	Krabak	ក្របាក់
