= Sangkat Baray (Doun Kaev Municipality) =

Baray សង្កាត់បារាយណ៍
- Sangkat
- Location within Cambodia
- Coordinates: 11°01′13″N 104°48′15″E
- Country: Cambodia
- Province: Takéo
- Municipality: Doun Kaev
- Time zone: UTC+7
- Geocode: 210801

Sangkat Baray (Khmer: សង្កាត់បារាយណ៍) is a sangkat (quarter) in Doun Kaev Municipality, Takeo Province, Cambodia.

== Administration ==
As of 2019, Sangkat Baray has 14 phums (villages) as follows.

No.	Code	Village	Khmer
1	21080101	Thon Mon Khang Cheung	ធន់មន់ខាងជើង
2	21080102	Thon Mon Khang Tboung	ធន់មន់ខាងត្បូង
3	21080103	Ruessei	ឫស្សី
4	21080104	Chrouy Prakhor	ជ្រោយប្រឃរ
5	21080105	Svay Chrum	ស្វាយជ្រុំ
6	21080106	Doun Peaeng	ដូនពែង
7	21080107	Svay Ruessei	ស្វាយឫស្សី
8	21080108	Khan Khav	ខាន់ខាវ
9	21080109	Trapeang Ruessei	ត្រពាំងឫស្សី
10	21080110	Krachab	ក្រចាប់
11	21080111	Trapeang Leak	ត្រពាំងលាក់
12	21080112	Chong Thnal	ចុងថ្នល់
13	21080113	Kreang Ta Pung	គ្រាំងតាពូង
14	21080114	Chrouy Samraong	ជ្រោយសំរោង
