= Krang Leav Commune (Bati District) =

Krang Leav ឃុំក្រាំងលាវ
- Commune (Khum)
- Location within Cambodia
- Coordinates: 11°13′13″N 104°43′29″E
- Country: Cambodia
- Province: Takéo
- District: Bati
- Time zone: UTC+7
- Geocode: 210206

Krang Leav Commune (Khmer: ឃុំក្រាំងលាវ) is a khum (commune) in Bati District, Takéo Province, Cambodia.

== Administration ==
As of 2019, Krang Leav Commune has 23 phums (villages) as follows.

No.	Code	Village	Khmer
1	21020601	Trapeang Pou	ត្រពាំងពោធិ
2	21020602	Srei Krong Reach	ស្រីគ្រងរាជ្យ
3	21020603	Prey Trach	ព្រៃត្រាច
4	21020604	Sameakki	សាមគ្គី
5	21020605	Ta Paen	តាប៉ែន
6	21020606	Mean Chey	មានជ័យ
7	21020607	Mean Chouk	មានជោគ
8	21020608	Prasat	ប្រាសាទ
9	21020609	Trach Koh	ត្រាចកុះ
10	21020610	Tram Tbal	ត្រាំត្បាល់
11	21020611	Rung	រូង
12	21020612	Trapeang Angk	ត្រពាំងអង្គ
13	21020613	Daeum Svay	ដើមស្វាយ
14	21020614	Prohut	ព្រហូត
15	21020615	Trapeang Chhuk	ត្រពាំងឈូក
16	21020616	Tuol Slaeng	ទួលស្លែង
17	21020617	Chheu Teal Chrum	ឈើទាលជ្រុំ
18	21020618	Krang Leav	ក្រាំងលាវ
19	21020619	Siem Dek	សៀមដេក
20	21020620	Prey Chonluonh	ព្រៃជន្លួញ
21	21020621	Tram Sasar	ត្រាំសសរ
22	21020622	Thnal Dach	ថ្នល់ដាច់
23	21020623	Banh Khla	បាញ់ខ្លា
