= Thlea Prachum Commune =

Thlea Prachum ឃុំធ្លាប្រជុំ
- Commune (Khum)
- Location within Cambodia
- Coordinates: 10°48′45″N 104°53′25″E
- Country: Cambodia
- Province: Takéo
- District: Kaoh Andaet
- Time zone: UTC+7
- Geocode: 210506

Thlea Prachum Commune (Khmer: ឃុំធ្លាប្រជុំ) is a khum (commune) in Kaoh Andaet District, Takéo Province, Cambodia.

== Administration ==
As of 2019, Thlea Prachum Commune has 7 phums (villages) as follows.

No.	Code	Village	Khmer
1	21050601	Roluos	រលួស
2	21050602	Lieb	លៀប
3	21050603	Trapeang Kak	ត្រពាំងកក់
4	21050604	Andoung Samret	អណ្ដូងសំរិត
5	21050605	Rung	រូង
6	21050606	Pnov	ព្នៅ
7	21050607	Si Sla	ស៊ីស្លា
