= Prey Kabbas Commune =

Prey Kabbas ឃុំព្រៃកប្បាស
- Commune (Khum)
- Location within Cambodia
- Coordinates: 11°05′49″N 104°56′46″E
- Country: Cambodia
- Province: Takéo
- District: Prey Kabbas
- Time zone: UTC+7
- Geocode: 210609

Prey Kabbas Commune (Khmer: ឃុំព្រៃកប្បាស) is a khum (commune) in Prey Kabbas District, Takéo Province, Cambodia.

== Administration ==
As of 2019, Prey Kabbas Commune has 10 phums (villages) as follows.

No.	Code	Village	Khmer
1	21060901	Pich Changva	ពេជចង្វា
2	21060902	Trapeang Kroch	ត្រពាំងក្រូច
3	21060903	Prey Kabbas Ka	ព្រៃកប្បាស ក
4	21060904	Prey Kabbas Kha	ព្រៃកប្បាស ខ
5	21060905	Prey Kabbas Ko	ព្រៃកប្បាស គ
6	21060906	Samchath	សំចត
7	21060907	Prey Prum	ព្រៃព្រំ
8	21060908	Doeum Po	ដើមពោធិ
9	21060909	Ampil Rieng	អំពិលរៀង
10	21060910	Our	អូរ
