= Sambuor Commune (Treang District) =

Sambuor ឃុំសំបួរ
- Commune (Khum)
- Location within Cambodia
- Coordinates: 10°56′32″N 104°54′23″E
- Country: Cambodia
- Province: Takéo
- District: Treang
- Time zone: UTC+7
- Geocode: 211009

Sambuor (Khmer: ឃុំសំបួរ) is a khum (commune) in Treang District, Takéo Province, Cambodia.

== Administration ==
The commune contains 10 phums (villages) as follows.

| No | Code | Village | Khmer | Note |
|---|---|---|---|---|
| 1 | 21100901 | Prey Phdau | ព្រៃផ្ដៅ | |
| 2 | 21100902 | Rovieng | រវៀង | |
| 3 | 21100903 | Prey Dok Por | ព្រៃដក់ពរ | |
| 4 | 21100904 | Prey Phlong | ព្រៃភ្លង | |
| 5 | 21100905 | Po | ពោធិ៍ | |
| 6 | 21100906 | Ta Proem | តាប្រឹម | |
| 7 | 21100907 | Tropeang Ponluh | ត្រពាំងពន្លុះ | |
| 8 | 21100908 | Kbal Po | ក្បាលពោធិ៍ | |
| 9 | 21100909 | Tnaot Chum | ត្នោតជុំ | |
| 10 | 21100910 | O Po | អូពោធិ៍ | |
