= Cheung Kuon Commune =

Cheung Kuon ឃុំជើងគួន
- Commune (Khum)
- Location within Cambodia
- Coordinates: 11°07′30″N 104°49′42″E
- Country: Cambodia
- Province: Takéo
- District: Samraŏng
- Time zone: UTC+7
- Geocode: 210703

Cheung Kuon Commune (Khmer: ឃុំជើងគួន) is a khum (commune) in Samraŏng District, Takéo Province, Cambodia.

== Administration ==
As of 2019, Cheung Kuon Commune has 11 phums (villages) as follows.

No.	Code	Village	Khmer
1	21070301	Trapeang Veng (~Veaeng)	ត្រពាំងវែង
2	21070302	Ta Mau	តាមៅ
3	21070303	Trapeang Vihear	ត្រពាំងវិហារ
4	21070304	Tbach	ត្បាច
5	21070305	Ta Khouy	តាខូយ
6	21070306	Cheung Kuon	ជើងគួន
7	21070307	Ponsang	ពន្សាំង
8	21070308	Anhchanh	អញ្ចាញ
9	21070309	Thkov	ថ្កូវ
10	21070310	Krang Lang	ក្រាំងឡង
11	21070311	Svay Chek	ស្វាយចេក
