= Kdanh Commune =

Khum (commune) in Prey Kabbas District, Takeo Province, Cambodia

Kdanh ឃុំក្ដាញ់
- Commune (Khum)
- Location within Cambodia
- Coordinates: 11°11′06″N 104°53′17″E
- Country: Cambodia
- Province: Takéo
- District: Prey Kabbas
- Time zone: UTC+7
- Geocode: 210607

Kdanh Commune (Khmer: ឃុំក្ដាញ់) is a khum (commune) in Prey Kabbas District, Takéo Province, Cambodia.

== Administration ==
As of 2019, Kdanh Commune has 7 phums (villages) as follows.

No.	Code	Village	Khmer
1	21060701	Trapeang Svay	ត្រពាំងស្វាយ
2	21060702	Samdach Poan	សម្ដេចពាន់
3	21060703	Kdanh	ក្ដាញ់
4	21060704	Kpam	ក្ប៉ម
5	21060705	Veal	វាល
6	21060706	Krang Vich	ក្រាំងវិច
7	21060707	Angk	អង្គ
