= Chi Khma Commune =

Chi Khma ឃុំជីខ្
- Commune (Khum)
- Location within Cambodia
- Coordinates: 10°48′23″N 104°47′58″E
- Country: Cambodia
- Province: Takéo
- District: Treang
- Time zone: UTC+7
- Geocode: 211003

Chi Khma (Khmer: ឃុំជីខ្មា) is a khum (commune) in Treang District, Takéo Province, in Cambodia.

== Administration ==
The commune contains 10 phums (villages) as follows.

No	Code	Village	Khmer	Note
1	21100301	Thkov	ថ្កូវ	
2	21100302	Chuos	ជួស	
3	21100303	Chhkae Slab	ឆ្កែស្លាប់	
4	21100304	Andaeng Saing Chvea	អណ្ដែងសាំងជ្វា	
5	21100305	Andaeng Saing Khmer	អណ្ដែងសាំងខ្មែរ	
6	21100306	Chreae	ជ្រែ	
7	21100307	Roka	រកា	
8	21100308	Yul Chek	យុលចេក	
9	21100309	Banteay	បន្ទាយ	
10	21100310	Chi Khma	ជីខ្មា	
