= Prasat Bayang =

Prasat Bayang is a ruined temple near Angkor Borei, in eastern Cambodia. The temple is known for having the earliest known depictions of Khmer numerals, dating back to AD 604.
