= Tang Doung Commune =

Tang Doung ឃុំតាំងដូង
- Commune (Khum)
- Location within Cambodia
- Coordinates: 11°19′24″N 104°43′53″E
- Country: Cambodia
- Province: Takéo
- District: Bati
- Time zone: UTC+7
- Geocode: 210212

Tang Doung Commune (Khmer: ឃុំតាំងដូង) is a khum (commune) in Bati District, Takéo Province, Cambodia.

== Administration ==
As of 2019, Tang Doung Commune has 10 phums (villages) as follows.

No.	Code	Village	Khmer
1	21021201	Prey Kdei	ព្រៃក្ដី
2	21021202	Angk Kralanh	អង្គក្រឡាញ់
3	21021203	Ampeae Tum	អំពែទុំ
4	21021204	Rovieng	រវៀង
5	21021205	Prey Kray	ព្រៃក្រាយ
6	21021206	Phsar Kump Ruessei	ផ្សារគុម្ពឫស្សី
7	21021207	Samraong Chrey	សំរោងជ្រៃ
8	21021208	Tuol Lhong	ទួលល្ហុង
9	21021209	Neal	នាល
10	21021210	Tang Doung	តាំងដូង
