= Krang Thnong Commune =

Krang Thnong ឃុំក្រាំងធ្នង់
- Commune (Khum)
- Location within Cambodia
- Coordinates: 11°20′06″N 104°50′41″E
- Country: Cambodia
- Province: Takéo
- District: Bati
- Time zone: UTC+7
- Geocode: 210207

Krang Thnong Commune (Khmer: ឃុំក្រាំងធ្នង់) is a khum (commune) in Bati District, Takéo Province, Cambodia.

== Administration ==
As of 2019, Krang Thnong Commune has 8 phums (villages) as follows.

No.	Code	Village	Khmer
1	21020701	Haknuman	ហនុមាន
2	21020702	Tbaeng	ត្បែង
3	21020703	Khnar	ខ្នារ
4	21020704	Thnal Teaksen	ថ្នល់ទក្សិណ
5	21020705	Chroung Sdau	ជ្រោងស្ដៅ
6	21020706	Tboung Damrei	ត្បូងដំរី
7	21020707	Krang Thnong	ក្រាំងធ្នង់
8	21020708	Tonle Bati	ទន្លេបាទី
