= Ream Andaeuk Commune =

Ream Andaeuk ឃុំរាមអណ្ដើក
- Commune (Khum)
- Location within Cambodia
- Coordinates: 10°40′49″N 104°46′49″E
- Country: Cambodia
- Province: Takéo
- District: Kiri Vong
- Time zone: UTC+7
- Geocode: 210410

Ream Andaeuk Commune (Khmer: ឃុំរាមអណ្ដើក) is a khum (commune) in Kiri Vong District, Takéo Province, Cambodia.

== Administration ==
As of 2019, Ream Andaeuk Commune has 8 phums (villages) as follows.

| No. | Code | Village | Khmer |
|---|---|---|---|
| 1 | 21041001 | Svay Sa | ស្វាយស |
| 2 | 21041002 | Trayueng | ត្រយឹង |
| 3 | 21041003 | Trapeang Run | ត្រពាំងរុន |
| 4 | 21041004 | Ream Andaeuk | រាមអណ្ដើក |
| 5 | 21041005 | Trapeang Khchau | ត្រពាំងខ្ចៅ |
| 6 | 21041006 | Kaoh Kosal | កោះកុសល |
| 7 | 21041007 | Kouk Roka | គោករកា |
| 8 | 21041008 | Pongro | ពង្រ |
