= Kouk Prech Commune =

Kouk Prech ឃុំគោកព្រេច
- Commune (Khum)
- Location within Cambodia
- Coordinates: 10°43′26″N 104°43′51″E
- Country: Cambodia
- Province: Takéo
- District: Kiri Vong
- Time zone: UTC+7
- Geocode: 210406

Kouk Prech Commune (Khmer: ឃុំគោកព្រេច) is a khum (commune) in Kiri Vong District, Takéo Province, Cambodia.

== Administration ==
As of 2019, Kouk Prech Commune has 13 phums (villages) as follows.

No.	Code	Village	Khmer
1	21040601	Trapeang Pring	ត្រពាំងព្រីង
2	21040602	Kbal Damrei	ក្បាលដំរី
3	21040603	Kouk Prech	គោកព្រេច
4	21040604	Chi Khmol	ជីឃ្មល់
5	21040605	Chheu Nieng Khpos	ឈើនៀងខ្ពស់
6	21040606	Slaeng	ស្លែង
7	21040607	Samraong Khang Kaeut	សំរោងខាងកើត
8	21040608	Samraong Khang Lech	សំរោងខាងលិច
9	21040609	Chambak	ចំបក់
10	21040610	Andoung Thum	អណ្ដូងធំ
11	21040611	Kouk Kruoh	គោកគ្រោះ
12	21040612	Prey Cheung	ព្រៃជើង
13	21040613	Bam	បាម
