= Kaev =

Kaev may refer to:

- Bar Kaev District
  - Kak Commune, Bar Kaev District
- Doun Kaev District
- Kaev Seima District
- KAEV Games
