= Lumpong Commune =

Lumpong ឃុំលំពង់
- Commune (Khum)
- Location within Cambodia
- Coordinates: 11°18′46″N 104°45′53″E
- Country: Cambodia
- Province: Takéo
- District: Bati
- Time zone: UTC+7
- Geocode: 210208

Lumpong Commune (Khmer: ឃុំលំពង់) is a khum (commune) in Bati district, Takéo province, Cambodia.

== Administration ==
As of 2019, Lumpong Commune has 12 phums (villages) as follows.

No.	Code	Village	Khmer
1	21020801	Krang Thum	ក្រាំងធំ
2	21020802	Trayueng Khpos	ត្រយឹងខ្ពស់
3	21020803	Bak Ronoas	បាក់រនាស់
4	21020804	Trapeang Kralanh	ត្រពាំងក្រឡាញ់
5	21020805	Thmei	ថ្មី
6	21020806	Pun Phnum	ពូនភ្នំ
7	21020807	Kandal	កណ្ដាល
8	21020808	Pean Meas Kaeut	ពានមាសកើត
9	21020809	Thma Sa	ថ្មស
10	21020810	Trapeang Kruos	ត្រពាំងគ្រួស
11	21020811	Trapeang Kralaong	ត្រពាំងក្រឡោង
12	21020812	Pean Meas Lech	ពានមាសលិច
