= Prey Lvea Commune =

Prey Lvea ឃុំព្រៃល្វា
- Commune (Khum)
- Location within Cambodia
- Coordinates: 11°09′32″N 104°57′19″E
- Country: Cambodia
- Province: Takéo
- District: Prey Kabbas
- Time zone: UTC+7
- Geocode: 210610

Prey Lvea Commune (Khmer: ឃុំព្រៃល្វា) is a khum (commune) in Prey Kabbas District, Takéo Province, Cambodia.

== Administration ==
As of 2019, Prey Lvea Commune has 6 phums (villages) as follows.

No.	Code	Village	Khmer
1	21061001	Prey Lvea Kaeut	ព្រៃល្វាកើត
2	21061002	Prey Lvea Lech	ព្រៃល្វាលិច
3	21061003	Anlong Meas	អន្លុងមាស
4	21061004	Ta Khon	តាខុន
5	21061005	Angk Krasang	អង្គក្រសាំង
6	21061006	Lvea Tnaot	ល្វាត្នោត
