= Boeng Tranh Khang Tboung Commune =

Boeng Tranh Khang Tboung ឃុំបឹងត្រាញ់ខាងត្បូង
- Commune (Khum)
- Location within Cambodia
- Coordinates: 11°05′54″N 104°43′05″E
- Country: Cambodia
- Province: Takéo
- District: Samraŏng
- Time zone: UTC+7
- Geocode: 210702

Boeng Tranh Khang Tboung Commune (Khmer: ឃុំបឹងត្រាញ់ខាងត្បូង) is a khum (commune) in Samraŏng District, Takéo Province, Cambodia.

== Administration ==
As of 2019, Boeng Tranh Khang Tboung Commune has 10 phums (villages) as follows.

No.	Code	Village	Khmer
1	21070201	Dak Por	ដក់ពរ
2	21070202	Srei Chey	ស្រីជ័យ
3	21070203	Khna Rung	ខ្នារុង
4	21070204	Boeng Tranh	បឹងត្រាញ់
5	21070205	Ta Sam	តាសំ
6	21070206	Moha Reach	មហារាជ្យ
7	21070207	Hang Heng	ហង់ហេង
8	21070208	Kampao	កំប៉ោ
9	21070209	Trapeang Veng (~Veaeng)	ត្រពាំងវែង
10	21070210	Tadak Pong	តាដក់ពង
