= Pech Sar Commune =

Pech Sar ឃុំពេជសារ
- Commune (Khum)
- Location within Cambodia
- Coordinates: 10°44′08″N 104°50′30″E
- Country: Cambodia
- Province: Takéo
- District: Kaoh Andaet
- Time zone: UTC+7
- Geocode: 210502

Pech Sar Commune (Khmer: ឃុំពេជសារ) is a khum (commune) in Kaoh Andaet District, Takéo Province, Cambodia.

== Administration ==
As of 2019, Pech Sar Commune has 17 phums (villages) as follows.

No.	Code	Village	Khmer
1	21050201	Ta Buor	តាបួរ
2	21050202	Chontol Mekh	ជន្ទល់មេឃ
3	21050203	Prey Thum	ព្រៃធំ
4	21050204	Damnak	ដំណាក់
5	21050205	Prey Bay	ព្រៃបាយ
6	21050206	Kouk Doung	គោកដូង
7	21050207	Trapeang Krasang	ត្រពាំងក្រសាំង
8	21050208	Ta Mouk	តាមោក
9	21050209	Pou	ពោធិ
10	21050210	Poun	ពោន
11	21050211	Pech Sar	ពេជសារ
12	21050212	Slaeng	ស្លែង
13	21050213	Sdau	ស្ដៅ
14	21050214	Chong Angkar	ចុងអង្ករ
15	21050215	Angkunh	អង្គុញ
16	21050216	Ta Baos	តាបស
17	21050217	Kouk Khpos	គោកខ្ពស់
