= Chambak Commune (Bati District) =

Chambak ឃុំចំបក់
- Commune (Khum)
- Location within Cambodia
- Coordinates: 11°14′07″N 104°49′05″E
- Country: Cambodia
- Province: Takéo
- District: Bati
- Time zone: UTC+7
- Geocode: 210201

Chambak Commune (Khmer: ឃុំចំបក់) is a khum (commune) in Bati District, Takéo Province, Cambodia.

== Administration ==
As of 2019, Chambak Commune has 12 phums (villages) as follows.

No.	Code	Village	Khmer
1	21020101	Ta Nob	តានប់
2	21020102	Bacham	បចាម
3	21020103	Mreah Prov	ម្រះព្រៅ
4	21020104	Trapeang Lean	ត្រពាំងលាន
5	21020105	Run	រុន
6	21020106	Sdau Aem	ស្ដៅឯម
7	21020107	Kanlaeng Khla	កន្លែងខ្លា
8	21020108	Seiha	សីហា
9	21020109	Boeng Leach	បឹងលាច
10	21020110	Veal Prei	វាលប្រីយ៍
11	21020111	Sramaoch Hae	ស្រមោចហែ
12	21020112	Trapeang Trayueng	ត្រពាំងត្រយឹង
