= Trapeang Krasang Commune =

Trapeang Krasang ឃុំត្រពាំងក្រសាំង
- Commune (Khum)
- Location within Cambodia
- Coordinates: 11°13′40″N 104°46′19″E
- Country: Cambodia
- Province: Takéo
- District: Bati
- Time zone: UTC+7
- Geocode: 210214

Trapeang Krasang Commune (Khmer: ឃុំត្រពាំងក្រសាំង) is a khum (commune) in Bati District, Takéo Province, Cambodia.

== Administration ==
As of 2019, Trapeang Krasang Commune has 17 phums (villages) as follows.

No.	Code	Village	Khmer
1	21021401	Trapeang Krasang	ត្រពាំងក្រសាំង
2	21021402	Thlok	ធ្លក
3	21021403	Roleang	រលាំង
4	21021404	Trapeang Prich	ត្រពាំងព្រិច
5	21021405	Kandal	កណ្ដាល
6	21021406	Trapeang Kieb	ត្រពាំងគៀប
7	21021407	Tnaot Chrum	ត្នោតជ្រុំ
8	21021408	Kou Duol	គោដួល
9	21021409	Rumduol	រំដួល
10	21021410	Mreah Prov	ម្រះព្រៅ
11	21021411	Trapeang Thum	ត្រពាំងធំ
12	21021412	Yeam Khau	យាមខៅ
13	21021413	Tuek Thla	ទឹកថ្លា
14	21021414	Roka Pok	រកាពក
15	21021415	Tram Sasar	ត្រាំសសរ
16	21021416	Boeng Ponheakut	បឹងពញគុត
17	21021417	Trapeang Chamkar	ត្រពាំងចំការ
