= Angkanh Commune (Prey Kabbas District) =

Angkanh ឃុំអង្កាញ់
- Commune (Khum)
- Location within Cambodia
- Coordinates: 11°04′56″N 104°56′56″E
- Country: Cambodia
- Province: Takéo
- District: Prey Kabbas
- Time zone: UTC+7
- Geocode: 210601

Angkanh Commune (Khmer: ឃុំអង្កាញ់) is a khum (commune) in Prey Kabbas District, Takéo Province, Cambodia.

== Administration ==
As of 2019, Angkanh Commune has 6 phums (villages) as follows.

| No. | Code | Village | Khmer |
|---|---|---|---|
| 1 | 21060101 | Trapeang Roka | ត្រពាំងរកា |
| 2 | 21060102 | Ba Noy | បា នយ |
| 3 | 21060103 | Phsar Chreae | ផ្សារជ្រែ |
| 4 | 21060104 | Pring | ព្រីង |
| 5 | 21060105 | Svay Pear | ស្វាយពារ |
| 6 | 21060106 | Angkanh | អង្កាញ់ |
