= Angkor Borei Commune =

Angkor Borei អង្គរបូរី
- Commune
- Angkor Borei Commune ឃុំអង្គរបូរី
- Location within Cambodia
- Coordinates: 10°59′48″N 104°58′30″E
- Country: Cambodia
- Province: Takéo
- District: Angkor Borei
- Time zone: UTC+7 (ICT)
- Geocode: 210101

Angkor Borei (Khmer: អង្គរបូរី) is a commune (khum) in Angkor Borei District, Takéo Province, Cambodia.

== Administration ==
As of 2019, the commune has 6 villages (phums) as follows.

No.	Code	Village	Khmer
1	21010101	Kampong Luong	កំពង់ហ្លួង
2	21010102	Stueng Kambot	ស្ទឹងកំបុត
3	21010103	Prey Sambuor	ព្រៃសំបួរ
4	21010104	Tuol Sang Ka	ទួលសាំង ក
5	21010105	Tuol Sang Kha	ទួលសាំង ខ
6	21010106	Sameakki	សាមគ្គី
