= Angk Khnor Commune =

Ang Khnor ឃុំអង្គខ្នុរ
- Commune (Khum)
- Location within Cambodia
- Coordinates: 10°51′22″N 104°49′49″E
- Country: Cambodia
- Province: Takéo
- District: Treang
- Time zone: UTC+7
- Geocode: 211002

Ang Khnor (Khmer: ឃុំអង្គខ្នុរ) is a khum (commune) in Treang District, Takéo Province, Cambodia.

== Administration ==
The commune contains 7 phums (villages) as follows.

No	Code	English	Khmer	Note
1	21100201	Speu	ស្ពឺ	
2	21100202	Kor	គ	
3	21100203	Tropeang Prei	ត្រពាំងប្រិយ៍	
4	21100204	Tropeang Roka	ត្រពាំងរកា	
5	21100205	Prey Meas	ព្រៃមាស	
6	21100206	Srae Vong	ស្រែវង្ស	
7	21100207	Ta Pheak	តាភាគ	
