= Char Commune =

Char ឃុំចារ
- Commune (Khum)
- Location within Cambodia
- Coordinates: 11°12′47″N 104°57′14″E
- Country: Cambodia
- Province: Takéo
- District: Prey Kabbas
- Time zone: UTC+7
- Geocode: 210604

Char Commune (Khmer: ឃុំចារ) is a khum (commune) in Prey Kabbas District, Takéo Province, Cambodia.

== Administration ==
As of 2019, Char Commune has 9 phums (villages) as follows.

No.	Code	Village	Khmer
1	21060401	Ampil Lech	អំពិលលិច
2	21060402	Ampil Kaeut	អំពិលកើត
3	21060403	Srae Pou	ស្រែពោធិ
4	21060404	Char	ចារ
5	21060405	Chant Mongkol	ច័ន្ទមង្គល
6	21060406	Sla	ស្លា
7	21060407	Bang Bat	បាំងបាត់
8	21060408	Svay Chal	ស្វាយចាល់
9	21060409	Angk Svay Chek	អង្គស្វាយចេក
