= Sanlong Commune (Treang District) =

Sanlong ឃុំសន្លុង
- Commune (Khum)
- Location within Cambodia
- Coordinates: 10°47′54″N 104°45′03″E
- Country: Cambodia
- Province: Takéo
- District: Treang
- Time zone: UTC+7
- Geocode: 211010

Sanlong (Khmer: ឃុំសន្លុង) is a khum (commune) in Treang District, Takéo Province, Cambodia.

== Administration ==
The commune contains 12 phums (villages) as follows.

No	Code	Village	Khmer	Note
1	21101001	Angk Ta Phauk	អង្គតាភោគ	
2	21101002	Angk Prangkor	អង្គប្រាង្គរ	
3	21101003	Chrey	ជ្រៃ	
4	21101004	Ta Preah	តាព្រះ	
5	21101005	Kreang Tnaot	គ្រាំងត្នោត	
6	21101006	Krosaing	ក្រសាំង	
7	21101007	Chen	ចិន	
8	21101008	Ponley	ពន្លៃ	
9	21101009	Srah Ta Kuon	ស្រះតាកួន	
10	21101010	Chi Chrab	ជីច្រាប	
11	21101011	Lauk	លោក	
12	21101012	Kraom	ក្រោម	
