= Kouk Thlok Commune =

Commune in Takeo Province, Cambodia

Kouk Thlok គោកធ្លក
- Commune
- Kouk Thlok Commune ឃុំគោកធ្លក
- Location within Cambodia
- Coordinates: 10°55′39″N 105°00′42″E
- Country: Cambodia
- Province: Takéo
- District: Angkor Borei
- Time zone: UTC+7 (ICT)
- Geocode: 210103

Kouk Thlok (Khmer: គោកធ្លក [koːk tʰlɔːk]) is a commune (khum) in Angkor Borei District, Takéo Province, Cambodia.

== Administration ==
As of 2019, the commune has 4 villages (phums) as follows.

No.	Code	Village	Khmer
1	21010301	Prek Ta Pha	ព្រែកតាផ
2	21010302	Prek Da	ព្រែកដា
3	21010303	Tuol Putrea	ទួលពុទ្រា
4	21010304	Bak Dai	បាក់ដៃ
