= Kiri Chong Kaoh Commune =

Kiri Chong Kaoh ឃុំគីរីចុងកោះ
- Commune (Khum)
- Location within Cambodia
- Coordinates: 10°36′45″N 104°52′28″E
- Country: Cambodia
- Province: Takéo
- District: Kiri Vong
- Time zone: UTC+7
- Geocode: 210405

Kiri Chong Kaoh Commune (Khmer: ឃុំគីរីចុងកោះ) is a khum (commune) in Kiri Vong District, Takéo Province, Cambodia.

== Administration ==
As of 2019, Kiri Chong Kaoh Commune has 6 phums (villages) as follows.

No.	Code	Village	Khmer
1	21040501	Chambak Tuem	ចំបក់ទឹម
2	21040502	Prey Ta Mau	ព្រៃតាម៉ៅ
3	21040503	Daeum Beng	ដើមបេង
4	21040504	Preal	ព្រាល
5	21040505	Chek	ចេក
6	21040506	Chrouy Slaeng	ជ្រោយស្លែង
