= Chey =

Chey may refer to:

== People ==
=== Given name ===
- Chey Chettha I (1575–1595), Cambodian king
- Chey Chettha II, Cambodian king
- Chey Chettha III (1639–1673), Cambodian king
- Chey Chettha IV (1656–1725), Cambodian king
- Chey Chettha V (1709–1755), Cambodian king
- Chey Dunkley (born 1992), English football player

=== Surname ===
- Chey Tae-won Tae-won (born 1960), South Korea billionaire businessman
- Timothy A. Chey, American film producer, writer and director

== Places ==
- Chey, Deux-Sèvres, Nouvelle-Aquitaine, France
- Chey Chouk Commune, Cambodia
- Chey Saen District, Cambodia

== Other ==
- CHEY-FM, Canadian radio station
