= Prey Ampok Commune =

Prey Ampok ឃុំព្រៃអំពក
- Commune (Khum)
- Location within Cambodia
- Coordinates: 10°37′08″N 104°48′10″E
- Country: Cambodia
- Province: Takéo
- District: Kiri Vong
- Time zone: UTC+7
- Geocode: 210408

Prey Ampok Commune (Khmer: ឃុំព្រៃអំពក) is a khum (commune) in Kiri Vong District, Takéo Province, Cambodia.

== Administration ==
As of 2019, Prey Ampok Commune has 9 phums (villages) as follows.

No.	Code	Village	Khmer
1	21040801	Prey Lieb	ព្រៃលៀប
2	21040802	Khvav	ខ្វាវ
3	21040803	Trapeang Pring	ត្រពាំងព្រីង
4	21040804	Amrae	អំរ៉ែ
5	21040805	Soben	សុបិណ
6	21040806	Prey Ampok	ព្រៃអំពក
7	21040807	Thnal Louk	ថ្នល់លោក
8	21040808	Pump Edth	ពុម្ពអិដ្ឋ
9	21040809	Chheu Teal Phluoh	ឈើទាលភ្លោះ
