= Snao Commune =

Snao ឃុំស្នោ
- Commune (Khum)
- Location within Cambodia
- Coordinates: 11°10′45″N 104°57′04″E
- Country: Cambodia
- Province: Takéo
- District: Prey Kabbas
- Time zone: UTC+7
- Geocode: 210612

Snao Commune (Khmer: ឃុំស្នោ) is a khum (commune) in Prey Kabbas District, Takéo Province, Cambodia.

== Administration ==
As of 2019, Snao Commune has 6 phums (villages) as follows.

No.	Code	Village	Khmer
1	21061201	Krang	ក្រាំង
2	21061202	Tongkeae	ទង្គែ
3	21061203	Snao	ស្នោ
4	21061204	Roka	រកា
5	21061205	Thoam Viney	ធម្មវិន័យ
6	21061206	Trapeang Reang	ត្រពាំងរាំង
