= Srangae Commune (Treang District) =

Srangae ឃុំស្រង៉ែ
- Commune (Khum)
- Location within Cambodia
- Coordinates: 10°57′26″N 104°49′47″E
- Country: Cambodia
- Province: Takéo
- District: Treang
- Time zone: UTC+7
- Geocode: 211012

Srangae (Khmer: ឃុំស្រង៉ែ) is a khum (commune) in Treang District, Takéo Province, Cambodia.

== Administration ==
The commune contains 15 phums (villages) as follows.

No	Code	Village	Khmer	Notes
1	21101201	Tnaot	ត្នោត	
2	21101202	Prey Tub	ព្រៃទប់	
3	21101203	Kreang	គ្រាំង	
4	21101204	Tropeang Bobos	ត្រពាំងបបុស្ស	
5	21101205	Trobek	ត្របែក	
6	21101206	Meun Tumrong	ម៉ឺនទំរង់	
7	21101207	Kork	គក	
8	21101208	Svay Ampear	ស្វាយអំពារ	
9	21101209	Kantuot	កន្ទួត	
10	21101210	Prey Run	ព្រៃរុន	
11	21101211	Snuol	ស្នួល	
12	21101212	Prey Chheu Teal	ព្រៃឈើទាល	
13	21101213	Prey Changriek	ព្រៃចង្រៀក	
14	21101214	Kauk Ampov	គោកអំពៅ	
15	21101215	Putth Sam	ពុទ្ធសាំ	
