= Kampong Krasang Commune =

Kampong Krasang ឃុំកំពង់ក្រសាំង
- Commune (Khum)
- Location within Cambodia
- Coordinates: 10°45′30″N 105°03′32″E
- Country: Cambodia
- Province: Takéo
- District: Bourei Cholsar
- Time zone: UTC+7
- Geocode: 210304

Kampong Krasang Commune (Khmer: ឃុំកំពង់ក្រសាំង) is a khum (commune) in Bourei Cholsar District, Takéo Province, Cambodia.

== Administration ==
As of 2019, Kampong Krasang Commune has five phums (villages) as follows.

No.	Code	Village	Khmer
1	21030401	Bourei Cholsar	បូរីជលសារ
2	21030402	Kampong Krasang	កំពង់ក្រសាំង
3	21030403	Kdol Chrum	ក្ដុលជ្រុំ
4	21030404	Sangkum Mean Chey	សង្គមមានជ័យ
5	21030405	Thma Bei Dom	ថ្មបីដុំ
