= Roneam Commune =

Roneam ឃុំរនាម
- Commune (Khum)
- Location within Cambodia
- Coordinates: 10°56′09″N 104°45′05″E
- Country: Cambodia
- Province: Takéo
- District: Treang
- Time zone: UTC+7
- Geocode: 211008

Roneam (Khmer: ឃុំរនាម) is a khum (commune) in Treang District, Takéo Province, Cambodia.

== Administration ==
The commune contains 11 phums (villages) as follows.

No	Code	Village	Khmer	Note
1	21100801	Trapeang Chrey	ត្រពាំងជ្រៃ	
2	21100802	Trapeang Rumpeak	ត្រពាំងរំពាក់	
3	21100803	Trapeang Thum	ត្រពាំងធំ	
4	21100804	Thoammeada	ធម្មតា	
5	21100805	Thmei	ថ្មី	
6	21100806	Prey Ph'av	ព្រៃផ្អាវ	
7	21100807	Khlaong Tvear	ខ្លោងទ្វារ	
8	21100808	Trapeang Khnor	ត្រពាំងខ្នុរ	
9	21100809	Prey Ph'er	ព្រៃផ្អេរ	
10	21100810	Kouk Khmoung	គោកឃ្មោង	
11	21100811	Sophi	សូភី	
