= Saom Commune =

Saom ឃុំសោម
- Commune (Khum)
- Location within Cambodia
- Coordinates: 10°33′46″N 104°51′50″E
- Country: Cambodia
- Province: Takéo
- District: Kiri Vong
- Time zone: UTC+7
- Geocode: 210411

Saom Commune (Khmer: ឃុំសោម) is a khum (commune) in Kiri Vong District, Takéo Province, Cambodia.

== Administration ==
As of 2019, Saom Commune has 12 phums (villages) as follows.

No.	Code	Village	Khmer
1	21041101	Tuol Pongro	ទួលពង្រ
2	21041102	Srae Khmuonh	ស្រែឃ្មួញ
3	21041103	Srae Kaes	ស្រែកែស
4	21041104	Preal	ព្រាល
5	21041105	Thmei	ថ្មី
6	21041106	Ping Pong	ពីងពង់
7	21041107	Saom	សោម
8	21041108	Daeum Rumdael	ដើមរំដែល
9	21041109	Daeum Angkaol	ដើមអង្កោល
10	21041110	Neasar Kiri	នាសារគិរី
11	21041111	Tonloab	ទន្លាប់
12	21041112	Trapeang Pong Tuek	ត្រពាំងពងទឹក
