= Kandoeng Commune =

Kandoeng ឃុំកណ្ដឹង
- Commune (Khum)
- Location within Cambodia
- Coordinates: 11°17′16″N 104°50′20″E
- Country: Cambodia
- Province: Takéo
- District: Bati
- Time zone: UTC+7
- Geocode: 210204

Kandoeng Commune (Khmer: ឃុំកណ្ដឹង) is a khum (commune) in Bati District, Takéo Province, Cambodia.

== Administration ==
In 2019, Kandoeng Commune had eight phums (villages) as follows.

No.	Code	Village	Khmer
1	21020401	Krasang	ក្រសាំង
2	21020402	Krang Ampil	ក្រាំងអំពិល
3	21020403	Aopheasang	ឱភាសាំង
4	21020404	Preah Mlob	ព្រះម្លប់
5	21020405	Trapeang Leuk	ត្រពាំងលើក
6	21020406	Kandoeng Thum	កណ្ដឹងធំ
7	21020407	Haknuman	ហនុមាន
8	21020408	Kandoeng Touch	កណ្ដឹងតូច
