= Prey Phdau Commune =

Prey Phdau ឃុំព្រៃផ្ដៅ
- Commune (Khum)
- Location within Cambodia
- Coordinates: 11°08′20″N 104°52′14″E
- Country: Cambodia
- Province: Takéo
- District: Prey Kabbas
- Time zone: UTC+7
- Geocode: 210611

Prey Phdau Commune (Khmer: ឃុំព្រៃផ្ដៅ) is a khum (commune) in Prey Kabbas District, Takéo Province, Cambodia.

== Administration ==
As of 2019, Prey Phdau Commune has 11 phums (villages) as follows.

No.	Code	Village	Khmer
1	21061101	Prey Robang	ព្រៃរបង
2	21061102	Kouk Trea	គោកទ្រា
3	21061103	Prey Phdau Tboung	ព្រៃផ្ដៅត្បូង
4	21061104	Prey Phdau Cheung	ព្រៃផ្ដៅជើង
5	21061105	Trapeang Thum	ត្រពាំងធំ
6	21061106	Chumrum	ជំរុំ
7	21061107	Saiva	សៃវ៉ា
8	21061108	Prey Phnhi	ព្រៃភ្ញី
9	21061109	Prey Chheu Teal	ព្រៃឈើទាល
10	21061110	Dong	ដុង
11	21061111	Sman Muni	ស្មន់មុនី
