= Ta Our Commune =

Ta Our ឃុំតាអូរ
- Commune (Khum)
- Location within Cambodia
- Coordinates: 10°32′49″N 104°48′14″E
- Country: Cambodia
- Province: Takéo
- District: Kiri Vong
- Time zone: UTC+7
- Geocode: 210412

Ta Our Commune (Khmer: ឃុំតាអូរ) is a khum (commune) in Kiri Vong District, Takéo Province, Cambodia.

== Administration ==
As of 2019, Ta Our Commune has 9 phums (villages) as follows.

No.	Code	Village	Khmer
1	21041201	Krasang Pul	ក្រសាំងពុល
2	21041202	Roliek	រលៀក
3	21041203	Sla	ស្លា
4	21041204	Daom	ដោម
5	21041205	Cheav Pdei Khang Kaeut	ជាវប្ដីខាងកើត
6	21041206	Cheav Pdei Khang Lech	ជាវប្ដីខាងលិច
7	21041207	Kreang Tromung	គ្រាំងទ្រមូង
8	21041208	Ta Our Khang Cheung	តាអូរខាងជើង
9	21041209	Ta Our Khang Tboung	តាអូរខាងត្បូង
