= Prek Phtoul Commune =

Prek Phtoul ព្រែកផ្ទោល
- Commune
- Prek Phtoul Commune ឃុំព្រែកផ្ទោល
- Location within Cambodia
- Coordinates: 10°57′47″N 104°58′32″E
- Country: Cambodia
- Province: Takéo
- District: Angkor Borei
- Time zone: UTC+7 (ICT)
- Geocode: 210105

Prek Phtoul (Khmer: ព្រែកផ្ទោល [prɛːk pʰtoːl]) is a commune (khum) in Angkor Borei District, Takéo Province, Cambodia.

== Administration ==
As of 2019, the commune has 4 villages (phums) as follows.

No.	Code	Village	Khmer
1	21010501	Angkor	អង្គរ
2	21010502	Kampong Pou	កំពង់ពោធិ៍
3	21010503	Phnum Bourei	ភ្នំបូរី
4	21010504	Phnum Ba Tep	ភ្នំបាទេព
