= Angkanh Commune (Treang District) =

Angkanh ឃុំអង្កាញ់
- Commune (Khum)
- Location within Cambodia
- Coordinates: 10°53′03″N 104°49′47″E
- Country: Cambodia
- Province: Takéo
- District: Treang
- Time zone: UTC+7
- Geocode: 211001

Angkanh (Khmer: ឃុំអង្កាញ់) is a khum (commune) in Treang District, Takéo Province, Cambodia.

== Administration ==
The commune contains 8 phums (villages) as follows.

No	Code	Village	Khmer	Note
1	21100101	Prey Tuk	ព្រៃទូក	
2	21100102	Roluos	រលួស	
3	21100103	Tropeang Khlaut	ត្រពាំងខ្លូត	
4	21100104	Tropeang Chhuk	ត្រពាំងឈូក	
5	21100105	Ta Ren Cho	តារេនជោ	
6	21100106	Kraing Chheu Nieng	ក្រាំងឈើនៀង	
7	21100107	Doek Mai	ដឹកម៉ៃ	
8	21100108	Angk Rokar	អង្គរការ	
