= Kampeaeng Commune (Kiri Vong District) =

Commune in Takéo, Cambodia

Kampeaeng កំពែង
- Commune (Khum)
- Location within Cambodia
- Coordinates: 10°39′04″N 104°42′31″E
- Country: Cambodia
- Province: Takéo
- District: Kiri Vong
- Time zone: UTC+07:00 (ICT)
- Geocode: 210404

Kampeaeng (Khmer: កំពែង [kɑm.ˈpɛːŋ]) is a khum (commune) in Kiri Vong District, Takéo Province, Cambodia.

== Administration ==
As of 2019, Kampeaeng Commune has 13 phums (villages) as follows.

| No. | Code | Village | Khmer |
|---|---|---|---|
| 1 | 21040401 | Ta Pov | តាពៅ |
| 2 | 21040402 | Thum | ធំ |
| 3 | 21040403 | Voat Phnum | វត្ដភ្នំ |
| 4 | 21040404 | Ang Khchau | អាងខ្ចៅ |
| 5 | 21040405 | Chi Mreak | ជីម្រាក់ |
| 6 | 21040406 | Han Tea | ហាន់ទា |
| 7 | 21040407 | Andoung Chrung | អណ្ដូងជ្រុង |
| 8 | 21040408 | Ponley | ពន្លៃ |
| 9 | 21040409 | Ta Meng | តាមេង |
| 10 | 21040410 | Svay Voa | ស្វាយវល្លិ |
| 11 | 21040411 | Prasat | ប្រាសាទ |
| 12 | 21040412 | Pou Bay | ពោធិ៍បាយ |
| 13 | 21040413 | Chrak Chi Koam | ច្រកជីគាំ |
