= Smaong Commune =

Smaong ឃុំស្មោង
- Commune (Khum)
- Location within Cambodia
- Coordinates: 10°47′54″N 104°50′07″E
- Country: Cambodia
- Province: Takéo
- District: Treang
- Time zone: UTC+7
- Geocode: 211011

Smaong (Khmer: ឃុំស្មោង) is a khum (commune) in Treang District, Takéo Province, Cambodia.

== Administration ==
The commune contains 5 phums (villages) as follows.

No	Code	Village	Khmer	Notes
1	21101101	Smaong	ស្មោង	
2	21101102	Tropeang Chrey	ត្រពាំងជ្រៃ	
3	21101103	Kampong Chrey	កំពង់ជ្រៃ	
4	21101104	Skul	ស្គុល	
5	21101105	Tropeang Leuk	ត្រពាំងលើក	
