= Khvav Commune (Samraong District) =

Khvav ឃុំខ្វាវ
- Commune (Khum)
- Location within Cambodia
- Coordinates: 11°10′42″N 104°43′13″E
- Country: Cambodia
- Province: Takéo
- District: Samraŏng
- Time zone: UTC+7
- Geocode: 210705

Khvav Commune (Khmer: ឃុំខ្វាវ) is a khum (commune) in Samraŏng District, Takéo Province, Cambodia.

== Administration ==
As of 2019, Khvav Commune has 18 phums (villages) as follows.

No.	Code	Village	Khmer
1	21070501	Leak Roteh	លាក់រទេះ
2	21070502	Trapeang Reang	ត្រពាំងរាំង
3	21070503	Prey Choar	ព្រៃជ័រ
4	21070504	Veah Puoh	វះពោះ
5	21070505	Trapeang Khlouk	ត្រពាំងឃ្លោក
6	21070506	Angkunh	អង្គញ់
7	21070507	Tram Kol	ត្រាំគល់
8	21070508	Kab Nuem	កាប់នឹម
9	21070509	Pou	ពោធិ៍
10	21070510	Khvav	ខ្វាវ
11	21070511	Boeng	បឹង
12	21070512	Our	អូរ
13	21070513	Trapeang Thnong	ត្រពាំងធ្នង់
14	21070514	Trapeang Puon	ត្រពាំងពួន
15	21070515	Prey Nhuek	ព្រៃញឹក
16	21070516	Svay Tong	ស្វាយទង
17	21070517	Tuol Ta Chen	ទួលតាចិន
18	21070518	Trapeang Trabaek	ត្រពាំងត្របែក
