= Samraong Commune (Samraong District) =

Samraong ឃុំសំរោង
- Commune (Khum)
- Location within Cambodia
- Coordinates: 11°08′22″N 104°47′20″E
- Country: Cambodia
- Province: Takéo
- District: Samraŏng
- Time zone: UTC+7
- Geocode: 210708

Samraong Commune (Khmer: ឃុំសំរោង) is a khum (commune) in Samraŏng District, Takéo Province, Cambodia.

== Administration ==
As of 2019, Samraong Commune has 9 phums (villages) as follows.

No.	Code	Village	Khmer
1	21070801	Kansaom Ak	កន្សោមអក
2	21070802	Dei Kraham	ដីក្រហម
3	21070803	Prey Totueng	ព្រៃទទឹង
4	21070804	Samraong	សំរោង
5	21070805	Tuol Char	ទួលចារ
6	21070806	Ta Poun Khang Kaeut	តាពោនខាងកើត
7	21070807	Ta Poun Khang Lech	តាពោនខាងលិច
8	21070808	Krang Ro'out	ក្រាំងរអូត
9	21070809	Svay	ស្វាយ
