= Tran Hiep =

- Born: 1975 or 1976 (age 50–51); Vietnam
- Citizenship: Australia

Ho Pham Hiep Huy, commonly known as Tran Hiep (born 1975 or 1976), is a Vietnamese-born Australian activist. Hiep disappeared in Cambodia on 18 September 2026, and was subsequently revealed to have been detained by the Vietnamese government. The Vietnamese government contends that Tran is a member of Viet Tan, a pro-democracy organization that government describes as a terrorist group.

== Personal life ==
Hiep moved to Australia as a teenager and is an Australian citizen. At the time of his abduction, he and his wife lived in Melbourne, where he worked as a freelance IT professional. Hiep founded "an advocacy organization focused on combating human trafficking of Vietnamese girls and women," and helped members of the Vietnamese diaspora improve their virtual security.

== Abduction and arrest ==
Hiep's disappearance on 18 September was first noticed by his wife when he stopped texting her. He had planned to meet her in Bangkok before both would return to Australia. She told media that Hiep had entered Cambodia legally to meet other pro-democracy activists. He had been travelling in Kaoh Andaet District, a district on Cambodia's southern border with Vietnam.

Vietnam's Ministry ‌of Public Security identited Norwegian citizen Nguyen Duc Thuan, Tran Hiep, and Vietnamese Thai Cong Truong Son as having been arrested on 18 September 2026 after allegedly trying to cross illegally from Cambodia into Vietnam.
