= Ponley Commune (Angkor Borei District) =

Ponley ពន្លៃ
- Commune
- Ponley Commune ឃុំពន្លៃ
- Location within Cambodia
- Coordinates: 11°03′42″N 104°52′42″E
- Country: Cambodia
- Province: Takéo
- District: Angkor Borei
- Time zone: UTC+7 (ICT)
- Geocode: 210104

Ponley (Khmer: ពន្លៃ [pɔnlɨj]) is a commune (khum) in Angkor Borei District, Takéo Province, Cambodia.

== Administration ==
As of 2019, the commune has 6 villages (phums) as follows.

| No. | Code | Village | Khmer |
|---|---|---|---|
| 1 | 21010401 | Ampil | អំពិល |
| 2 | 21010402 | Sramok | ស្រម៉ុក |
| 3 | 21010403 | Ponley Khang Cheung | ពន្លៃខាងជើង |
| 4 | 21010404 | Ponley Khang Tboung | ពន្លៃខាងត្បូង |
| 5 | 21010405 | Samraong | សំរោង |
| 6 | 21010406 | Thlok Yul | ធ្លកយុល |
