= Ba Srae Commune =

Commune in Takéo Province, Cambodia

Ba Srae បាស្រែ
- Commune
- Ba Srae Commune ឃុំបាស្រែ
- Location within Cambodia
- Coordinates: 11°03′27″N 104°57′57″E
- Country: Cambodia
- Province: Takéo
- District: Angkor Borei
- Time zone: UTC+7 (ICT)
- Geocode: 210102

Ba Srae (Khmer: បាស្រែ [ɓaː srae]) is a commune (khum) in Angkor Borei District, Takéo Province, Cambodia.

== Administration ==
As of 2019, the commune has 8 villages (phums) as follows.

No.	Code	Village	Khmer
1	21010201	Svay Khang Tboung	ស្វាយខាងត្បូង
2	21010202	Svay Khang Cheung	ស្វាយខាងជើង
3	21010203	Ba Srae	បាស្រែ
4	21010204	Rumlok	រំលក
5	21010205	Prey Ba Soeng	ព្រៃបាសឹង
6	21010206	Ta Ei	តាអី
7	21010207	Roka	រកា
8	21010208	Puon Kak	ពួនកក
