= Pot Sar Commune =

Pot Sar ឃុំពត់សរ
- Commune (Khum)
- Location within Cambodia
- Coordinates: 11°19′34″N 104°54′09″E
- Country: Cambodia
- Province: Takéo
- District: Bati
- Time zone: UTC+7
- Geocode: 210210

Pot Sar Commune (Khmer: ឃុំពត់សរ) is a khum (commune) in Bati District, Takéo Province, Cambodia.

== Administration ==
As of 2019, Pot Sar Commune has 11 phums (villages) as follows.

| No. | Code | Village | Khmer |
|---|---|---|---|
| 1 | 21021001 | Prey Sva | ព្រៃស្វា |
| 2 | 21021002 | Krouch | ក្រូច |
| 3 | 21021003 | Krang Pou | ក្រាំងពោធិ៍ |
| 4 | 21021004 | Trapeang Trav | ត្រពាំងត្រាវ |
| 5 | 21021005 | Chambak | ចំបក់ |
| 6 | 21021006 | Pot Sar | ពត់សរ |
| 7 | 21021007 | Tang Ruessei | តាំងឫស្សី |
| 8 | 21021008 | Kleang Sambatt | ឃ្លាំងសម្បត្ដិ |
| 9 | 21021009 | Kandaol | កណ្ដោល |
| 10 | 21021010 | Khvan Meas | ខ្វាន់មាស |
| 11 | 21021011 | Khla Koun | ខ្លាកូន |
