= Tang Yab Commune =

Tang Yab ឃុំតាំងយ៉ាប
- Commune (Khum)
- Location within Cambodia
- Coordinates: 11°11′09″N 104°51′55″E
- Country: Cambodia
- Province: Takéo
- District: Prey Kabbas
- Time zone: UTC+7
- Geocode: 210613

Tang Yab Commune (Khmer: ឃុំតាំងយ៉ាប) is a khum (commune) in Prey Kabbas District, Takéo Province, Cambodia.

== Administration ==
As of 2019, Tang Yab Commune has 12 phums (villages) as follows.

No.	Code	Village	Khmer
1	21061301	Trapeang Tea	ត្រពាំងទា
2	21061302	Prey Chambak	ព្រៃចំបក់
3	21061303	Trapeang Sdok	ត្រពាំងស្ដុក
4	21061304	Snoul Khpos	ស្នូលខ្ពស់
5	21061305	Krang Ampil	ក្រាំងអំពិល
6	21061306	Krang Chamraeun	ក្រាំងចំរើន
7	21061307	Chumrov	ជំរៅ
8	21061308	Kaev Chamraeun	កែវចំរើន
9	21061309	Roluos	រលួស
10	21061310	Chranieng Khpos	ច្រនៀងខ្ពស់
11	21061311	Ang Roveay	អង់រវាយ
12	21061312	Sambour	សំបូរ
