= Tnaot Commune (Bati District) =

Tnaot ឃុំត្នោត
- Commune (Khum)
- Location within Cambodia
- Coordinates: 11°12′49″N 104°52′46″E
- Country: Cambodia
- Province: Takéo
- District: Bati
- Time zone: UTC+7
- Geocode: 210213

Tnaot Commune (Khmer: ឃុំត្នោត) is a khum (commune) in Bati District, Takéo Province, Cambodia.

== Administration ==
As of 2019, Tnaot Commune has 8 phums (villages) as follows.

No.	Code	Village	Khmer
1	21021301	Tnaot	ត្នោត
2	21021302	Rumchek	រំចេក
3	21021303	Ta Nob	តានប់
4	21021304	Ta Non	តានន
5	21021305	Thmei	ថ្មី
6	21021306	Pey	ពៃ
7	21021307	Prey Chob	ព្រៃជប់
8	21021308	Chheu Teal	ឈើទាល
