= Prey Khla Commune (Kaoh Andaet District) =

Prey Khla ឃុំព្រៃខ្លា
- Commune (Khum)
- Location within Cambodia
- Coordinates: 10°45′22″N 104°56′04″E
- Country: Cambodia
- Province: Takéo
- District: Kaoh Andaet
- Time zone: UTC+7
- Geocode: 210503

Prey Khla Commune (Khmer: ឃុំព្រៃខ្លា) is a khum (commune) in Kaoh Andaet District, Takéo Province, Cambodia.

== Administration ==
As of 2019, Prey Khla Commune has 15 phums (villages) as follows.

No.	Code	Village	Khmer
1	21050301	Srama	ស្រម៉
2	21050302	Srae Boeng	ស្រែបឹង
3	21050303	Prey Melong Khang Tboung	ព្រៃមេលងខាងត្បូង
4	21050304	Prey Melong Khang Cheung	ព្រៃមេលងខាងជើង
5	21050305	Kansaom Ak	កន្សោមអក
6	21050306	Chambak	ចំបក់
7	21050307	Samphli	សំភ្លី
8	21050308	Kor	គរ
9	21050309	Tang Reasei	តាំងរាសី
10	21050310	Prey Khla Khang Cheung	ព្រៃខ្លាខាងជើង
11	21050311	Prey Khla Khang Tboung	ព្រៃខ្លាខាងត្បូង
12	21050312	Banteay Thleay	បន្ទាយធ្លាយ
13	21050313	Kaev Kamphleung	កែវកាំភ្លើង
14	21050314	Tuol Kandal	ទួលកណ្ដាល
15	21050315	Chumrum	ជំរំ
