= Kampeaeng Commune (Prey Kabbas District) =

Commune in Takéo, Cambodia

Kampeaeng កំពែង
- Commune (Khum)
- Location within Cambodia
- Coordinates: 11°05′54″N 104°52′09″E
- Country: Cambodia
- Province: Takéo
- District: Prey Kabbas
- Time zone: UTC+07:00 (ICT)
- Geocode: 210605

Kampeaeng (Khmer: កំពែង [kɑm.pɛːŋ]) is a khum (commune) in Prey Kabbas District, Takéo Province, Cambodia.

== Administration ==
As of 2019, Kampeaeng Commune has 9 phums (villages) as follows.

No.	Code	Village	Khmer
1	21060501	Ta Mung	តាមូង
2	21060502	Changkaeub	ចង្កើប
3	21060503	Ta Loung	តាឡូង
4	21060504	Thmei	ថ្មី
5	21060505	Kampeaeng Thum	កំពែងធំ
6	21060506	Kampeaeng Tboung	កំពែងត្បូង
7	21060507	Angk Chruk	អង្គជ្រូក
8	21060508	Chamnaom	ចំណោម
9	21060509	Trapeang Angk	ត្រពាំងអង្គ
