= Champei Commune (Bati District) =

Champei ឃុំចំប៉ី
- Commune (Khum)
- Location within Cambodia
- Coordinates: 11°16′50″N 104°52′45″E
- Country: Cambodia
- Province: Takéo
- District: Bati
- Time zone: UTC+7
- Geocode: 210202

Champei Commune (Khmer: ឃុំចំប៉ី) is a khum (commune) in Bati District, Takéo Province, Cambodia.

== Administration ==
As of 2019, Champei Commune has 7 phums (villages) as follows.

No.	Code	Village	Khmer
1	21020201	Daeum Doung	ដើមដូង
2	21020202	Mkak	ម្កាក់
3	21020203	Trakiet	ត្រគៀត
4	21020204	Prek (Preaek)	ព្រែក
5	21020205	Moeang Prachen	មឿងប្រចិន
6	21020206	Prey Mul	ព្រៃមូល
7	21020207	Cheung Loung	ជើងលោង
