= Tralach Commune =

Tralach ឃុំត្រឡាច
- Commune (Khum)
- Location within Cambodia
- Coordinates: 10°49′44″N 104°50′06″E
- Country: Cambodia
- Province: Takéo
- District: Treang
- Time zone: UTC+7
- Geocode: 211014

Tralach (Khmer: ឃុំត្រឡាច) is a khum (commune) in Treang District, Takéo Province, Cambodia.

== Administration ==
The commune contains 10 phums (villages) as follows.

No	Code	Village	Khmer	Notes
1	21101401	Tonle	ទន្លេ	
2	21101402	Chhoes	ឆឹស	
3	21101403	Trolach	ត្រឡាច	
4	21101404	Samraong	សំរោង	
5	21101405	Chi Ngo	ជីងោ	
6	21101406	Angkunh	អង្គុញ	
7	21101407	Kantuot Thum	កន្ទួតធំ	
8	21101408	Kantuot Touch	កន្ទួតតូច	
9	21101409	Paun	ពោន	
10	21101410	Tropeang Chhuk	ត្រពាំងឈូក	
