= Boeng Tranh Khang Cheung Commune =

Boeng Tranh Khang Cheung ឃុំបឹងត្រាញ់ខាងជើង
- Commune (Khum)
- Location within Cambodia
- Coordinates: 11°08′27″N 104°43′05″E
- Country: Cambodia
- Province: Takéo
- District: Samraŏng
- Time zone: UTC+7
- Geocode: 210701

Boeng Tranh Khang Cheung Commune (Khmer: ឃុំបឹងត្រាញ់ខាងជើង) is a khum (commune) in Samraŏng District, Takéo Province, Cambodia.

== Administration ==
As of 2019, Boeng Tranh Khang Cheung Commune has 9 phums (villages) as follows.

No.	Code	Village	Khmer
1	21070101	Khnach Khang Cheung	ខ្នាចខាងជើង
2	21070102	Khnach Khang Tboung	ខ្នាចខាងត្បូង
3	21070103	Chheu Teal	ឈើទាល
4	21070104	Pech Entrea	ពេជឥន្ទ្រា
5	21070105	Romon	រមន់
6	21070106	Bei Pey	បីពៃ
7	21070107	Pech Changva	ពេជចង្វា
8	21070108	Angk Reang	អង្គរាំង
9	21070109	Koun Romeas	កូនរមាស
