= Sour Phi Commune =

Sour Phi ឃុំសូរភី
- Commune (Khum)
- Location within Cambodia
- Coordinates: 11°17′02″N 104°43′28″E
- Country: Cambodia
- Province: Takéo
- District: Bati
- Time zone: UTC+7
- Geocode: 210211

Sour Phi Commune (Khmer: ឃុំសូរភី) is a khum (commune) in Bati District, Takéo Province, Cambodia.

== Administration ==
As of 2019, Sour Phi Commune has 8 phums (villages) as follows.

No.	Code	Village	Khmer
1	21021101	Champa	ចំប៉ា
2	21021102	Tram Khnar	ត្រាំខ្នារ
3	21021103	Trapeang Ruessei	ត្រពាំងឫស្សី
4	21021104	Samraong	សំរោង
5	21021105	Prohaek	ព្រហែក
6	21021106	Trapeang Chhuk	ត្រពាំងឈូក
7	21021107	Cheung Kout	ជើងកូត
8	21021108	Phnum Touch	ភ្នំតូច
