= Prambei Mum Commune =

Prambei Mum ឃុំប្រាំបីមុំ
- Commune (Khum)
- Location within Cambodia
- Coordinates: 10°50′34″N 104°47′08″E
- Country: Cambodia
- Province: Takéo
- District: Treang
- Time zone: UTC+7
- Geocode: 211005

Prambei Mum (Khmer: ឃុំប្រាំបីមុំ) is a khum (commune) in Treang District, Takéo Province, Cambodia.

== Administration ==
The commune contains 12 phums (villages) as follows.

No	Code	Village	Khmer	Note
1	21100501	Tropeang Veng	ត្រពាំងវែង	
2	21100502	Damnak Reachea	ដំណាក់រាជា	
3	21100503	Dangkao	ដង្កោ	
4	21100504	Chheu Teal Phluoh	ឈើទាលភ្លោះ	
5	21100505	Prambei Mum	ប្រាំបីមុំ	
6	21100506	Kraing Kandal	ក្រាំងកណ្ដាល	
7	21100507	Tropeang Leuk	ត្រពាំងលើក	
8	21100508	Kraing Sbaek	ក្រាំងស្បែក	
9	21100509	Ponhea Lueu	ពញ្ញាឮ	
10	21100510	Prey Chheu Teal	ព្រៃឈើទាល	
11	21100511	Rovieng	រវៀង	
12	21100512	Lve Thmei	ល្វេថ្មី	
