= Doung Commune (Bati District) =

Doung ឃុំដូង
- Commune (Khum)
- Location within Cambodia
- Coordinates: 11°15′46″N 104°54′57″E
- Country: Cambodia
- Province: Takéo
- District: Bati
- Time zone: UTC+7
- Geocode: 210203

Doung Commune (Khmer: ឃុំដូង) is a khum (commune) in Bati District, Takéo Province, Cambodia.

== Administration ==
As of 2019, Doung Commune has 8 phums (villages) as follows.

No.	Code	Village	Khmer
1	21020301	Pramoul Sokh	ប្រមូលសុខ
2	21020302	Krang Prateal	ក្រាំងប្រទាល
3	21020303	Svay Kham	ស្វាយខម
4	21020304	Yutthka	យុថ្កា
5	21020305	Chek	ចេក
6	21020306	Doung	ដូង
7	21020307	Kandal	កណ្ដាល
8	21020308	Ta Non	តានន
