= Khvav Commune (Treang District) =

Khvav ឃុំខ្វាវ
- Commune (Khum)
- Location within Cambodia
- Coordinates: 10°53′47″N 104°43′12″E
- Country: Cambodia
- Province: Takéo
- District: Treang
- Time zone: UTC+7
- Geocode: 211004

Khvav (Khmer: ឃុំខ្វាវ) is a khum (commune) in Treang District, Takéo Province, Cambodia.

== Administration ==
The commune contains 11 phums (villages) as follows.

No	Code	Village	Khmer	Note
1	21100401	Pongro	ពង្រ	
2	21100402	Ta Soeng	តាសឹង	
3	21100403	Kdei Run	ក្ដីរុន	
4	21100404	Kokaoh	កកោះ	
5	21100405	Samor Leu	សម៉លើ	
6	21100406	Thommoda	ធម្មតា	
7	21100407	Samor Kraom	សម៉ក្រោម	
8	21100408	Ta Sren	តាស្រែន	
9	21100409	Daun Pheu	ដូនភើ	
10	21100410	Prues Leu	ព្រឹសលើ	
11	21100411	Prues Kraom	ព្រឹសក្រោម	
