= Trea Commune (Samraong District) =

Trea ឃុំទ្រា
- Commune (Khum)
- Location within Cambodia
- Coordinates: 11°04′36″N 104°49′31″E
- Country: Cambodia
- Province: Takéo
- District: Samraŏng
- Time zone: UTC+7
- Geocode: 210711

Trea Commune (Khmer: ឃុំទ្រា) is a khum (commune) in Samraŏng District, Takéo Province, Cambodia.

== Administration ==
As of 2019, Trea Commune has 11 phums (villages) as follows.

No.	Code	Village	Khmer
1	21071101	Veng (Veaeng)	វែង
2	21071102	Samraong	សំរោង
3	21071103	Ruessei Chum	ឫស្សីជុំ
4	21071104	Saen Pheas	សែនភាស
5	21071105	Tnaot Ter	ត្នោតទេរ
6	21071106	Dountei	ដូនតី
7	21071107	Sambuor	សំបួរ
8	21071108	Trea Leu	ទ្រាលើ
9	21071109	Kampong Trea	កំពង់ទ្រា
10	21071110	Thmea	ធ្មា
11	21071111	Doung	ដូង
