= Sla Commune =

Sla ឃុំស្លា
- Commune (Khum)
- Location within Cambodia
- Coordinates: 11°09′35″N 104°49′31″E
- Country: Cambodia
- Province: Takéo
- District: Samraŏng
- Time zone: UTC+7
- Geocode: 210710

Sla Commune (Khmer: ឃុំស្លា) is a khum (commune) in Samraŏng District, Takéo Province, Cambodia.

== Administration ==
As of 2019, Sla Commune has 13 phums (villages) as follows.

No.	Code	Village	Khmer
1	21071001	Sla Khang Lech	ស្លាខាងលិច
2	21071002	Sla Khang Kaeut	ស្លាខាងកើត
3	21071003	Angk Chang'er	អង្គចង្អេរ
4	21071004	Trapeang Trav	ត្រពាំងត្រាវ
5	21071005	Kantrong Prech	កន្ទ្រង់ព្រិច
6	21071006	Boeng Kantron	បឹងកន្ទ្រន់
7	21071007	Trapeang Srang	ត្រពាំងស្រង់
8	21071008	Pou	ពោធិ
9	21071009	Ampil	អំពិល
10	21071010	Kanhchang	កញ្ចាង
11	21071011	Srei Bandit	ស្រីបណ្ឌិត
12	21071012	Srei Prasaeur	ស្រីប្រសើរ
13	21071013	A Roung	អារោង
