= Sangkat Roka Knong =

Roka Knong សង្កាត់រកាក្នុង
- Sangkat
- Location within Cambodia
- Coordinates: 10°59′17″N 104°46′58″E
- Country: Cambodia
- Province: Takéo
- Municipality: Doun Kaev
- Time zone: UTC+7
- Geocode: 210802

Sangkat Roka Knong (Khmer: សង្កាត់រកាក្នុង) is a sangkat (quarter) in Doun Kaev Municipality, Takéo Province, Cambodia.

== Administration ==
As of 2019, Sangkat Roka Knong has 12 phums (villages) as follows.

No.	Code	Village	Khmer
1	21080201	Chak	ចក
2	21080202	Phsar Ta Kao	ផ្សារតាកោ
3	21080203	Sambuor	សំបួរ
4	21080204	Khsoeng	ខ្សឹង
5	21080205	Ou Svay Chek	អូរស្វាយចេក
6	21080206	Chres	ច្រេស
7	21080207	Prey Prum	ព្រៃព្រហ្ម
8	21080208	Louri	ឡូរី
9	21080209	Phum 1	ភូមិ១
10	21080210	Phum 2	ភូមិ២
11	21080211	Phum 3	ភូមិ៣
12	21080212	Snaor	ស្នោរ
