= Ban Kam Commune =

Ban Kam ឃុំបានកាម
- Commune (Khum)
- Location within Cambodia
- Coordinates: 11°07′57″N 104°57′17″E
- Country: Cambodia
- Province: Takéo
- District: Prey Kabbas
- Time zone: UTC+7
- Geocode: 210602

Ban Kam Commune (Khmer: ឃុំបានកាម) is a khum (commune) in Prey Kabbas District, Takéo Province, Cambodia.

== Administration ==
As of 2019, Ban Kam Commune has 7 phums (villages) as follows.

No.	Code	Village	Khmer
1	21060201	Samraong Mreah	សំរោងម្រះ
2	21060202	Doung Khpos	ដូងខ្ពស់
3	21060203	Thlok Doun Tum	ថ្លុកដូនទុំ
4	21060204	Thnal Bat	ថ្នល់បត់
5	21060205	Sedthei	សេដ្ឋី
6	21060206	Pontong	ពន្ទង
7	21060207	Ta Vong	តាវង្ស
