= Prey Rumdeng Commune (Kiri Vong District) =

Prey Rumdeng ឃុំព្រៃរំដេង
- Commune (Khum)
- Location within Cambodia
- Coordinates: 10°34′12″N 104°44′48″E
- Country: Cambodia
- Province: Takéo
- District: Kiri Vong
- Time zone: UTC+7
- Geocode: 210409

Prey Rumdeng (Khmer: ព្រៃរំដេង [prəj rum.ɗeːŋ]) is a khum (commune) in Kiri Vong District, Takéo Province, Cambodia.

== Administration ==
As of 2019, Prey Rumdeng Commune has 11 phums (villages) as follows.

No.	Code	Village	Khmer
1	21040901	Phnum Krapeu	ភ្នំក្រពើ
2	21040902	Buor	បួរ
3	21040903	Chamreh	ចំរេះ
4	21040904	Damnak Thngan	ដំណាក់ថ្ងាន់
5	21040905	Bapol	បពល
6	21040906	Trapeang Chey	ត្រពាំងជៃ
7	21040907	Dei Kraham	ដីក្រហម
8	21040908	Trapeang Veng (~ Veaeng)	ត្រពាំងវែង
9	21040909	Trapeang Pidao	ត្រពាំងពិដោ
10	21040910	Prey Rumdeng	ព្រៃរំដេង
11	21040911	Boeng Tumnob	បឹងទំនប់
