= Pea Ream Commune =

Pea Ream ឃុំពារាម
- Commune (Khum)
- Location within Cambodia
- Coordinates: 11°14′33″N 104°52′05″E
- Country: Cambodia
- Province: Takéo
- District: Bati
- Time zone: UTC+7
- Geocode: 210209

Pea Ream Commune (Khmer: ឃុំពារាម) is a khum (commune) in Bati District, Takéo Province, Cambodia.

== Administration ==
As of 2019, Pea Ream Commune has 8 phums (villages) as follows.

No.	Code	Village	Khmer
1	21020901	Tang Nheat	តាំងញាតិ
2	21020902	Pea Ream	ពារាម
3	21020903	Khnar Thum	ខ្នារធំ
4	21020904	Khnar Roung	ខ្នាររោង
5	21020905	Trapeang Young	ត្រពាំងយោង
6	21020906	Chumrov	ជំរៅ
7	21020907	Krang Krachang	ក្រាំងក្រចាង
8	21020908	Kruos	គ្រួស
