= Angk Kev Commune =

Angk Kev ឃុំអង្គកែវ
- Commune (Khum)
- Location within Cambodia
- Coordinates: 10°50′39″N 104°44′11″E
- Country: Cambodia
- Province: Takéo
- District: Treang
- Time zone: UTC+7
- Geocode: 211006

Angk Kev (Khmer: ឃុំអង្គកែវ) is a khum (commune) in Treang District, Takéo Province, Cambodia.

== Administration ==
The commune contains 8 phums (villages) as follows.

No	Code	Village	Khmer	Note
1	21100601	O Krolang Duol	អូក្រឡង់ដួល	
2	21100602	Tropeang Kok	ត្រពាំងកក់	
3	21100603	Angk Kev	អង្គកែវ	
4	21100604	Prey Rumpeak	ព្រៃរំពាក់	
5	21100605	Thnuoh	ធ្នោះ	
6	21100606	Tropeang Snao	ត្រពាំងស្នោ	
7	21100607	Serei Duoch	សេរីដួច	
8	21100608	O Ta Sek	អូតាសេក	
