= Krapum Chhuk Commune =

Krapum Chhuk ឃុំក្រពុំឈូក
- Commune (Khum)
- Location within Cambodia
- Coordinates: 10°42′49″N 104°56′07″E
- Country: Cambodia
- Province: Takéo
- District: Kaoh Andaet
- Time zone: UTC+7
- Geocode: 210501

Krapum Chhuk Commune (Khmer: ឃុំក្រពុំឈូក) is a khum (commune) in Kaoh Andaet District, Takéo Province, Cambodia.

== Administration ==
As of 2019, Krapum Chhuk Commune has 13 phums (villages) as follows.

No.	Code	Village	Khmer
1	21050101	Daeum Doung	ដើមដូង
2	21050102	Beng	បេង
3	21050103	Krapum Chhuk	ក្រពុំឈូក
4	21050104	Prey Mlu	ព្រៃម្លូ
5	21050105	Peani	ពាន្នី
6	21050106	Ta Por	តាពរ
7	21050107	Trapeang Ta Uy	ត្រពាំងតាអ៊ុយ
8	21050108	Kaoh Moan	កោះមាន់
9	21050109	Voat Sla	វត្ដស្លា
10	21050110	Chrouy Poun	ជ្រោយពោន
11	21050111	Khla Krohuem Ka	ខ្លាគ្រហឹម ក
12	21050112	Khla Krohuem Kha	ខ្លាគ្រហឹម ខ
13	21050113	Trapeang Tonle	ត្រពាំងទន្លេ
