= Phnum Den Commune =

Phnum Den ឃុំភ្នំដិន
- Commune (Khum)
- Location within Cambodia
- Coordinates: 10°35′27″N 104°54′24″E
- Country: Cambodia
- Province: Takéo
- District: Kiri Vong
- Time zone: UTC+7
- Geocode: 210407

Phnum Den Commune (Khmer: ឃុំភ្នំដិន) is a khum (commune) in Kiri Vong District, Takéo Province, Cambodia. It is known for its picturesque landscapes and agricultural activities, reflecting the rural lifestyle of the region.

== Administration ==
As of 2019, Phnum Den Commune has 9 phums (villages) as follows.

No.	Code	Village	Khmer
1	21040701	Phsar	ផ្សារ
2	21040702	Ta Loeng	តាឡឹង
3	21040703	Kandal	កណ្ដាល
4	21040704	Ta Rung	តារុង
5	21040705	Chvea	ជ្វា
6	21040706	Andoung Kien	អណ្ដូងគៀន
7	21040707	Thum	ធំ
8	21040708	Totueng	ទទឹង
9	21040709	Thmei	ថ្មី
