= Prey Phkoam Commune =

Prey Phkoam ព្រៃផ្គាំ
- Commune
- Prey Phkoam Commune ឃុំព្រៃផ្គាំ
- Location within Cambodia
- Coordinates: 11°01′28″N 104°54′35″E
- Country: Cambodia
- Province: Takéo
- District: Angkor Borei
- Time zone: UTC+7 (ICT)
- Geocode: 210106

Prey Phkoam (Khmer: ព្រៃផ្គាំ [prɨj pʰkŏəm]) is a commune (khum) in Angkor Borei District, Takéo Province, Cambodia.

== Administration ==
As of 2019, the commune has 6 villages (phums) as follows.

No.	Code	Village	Khmer
1	21010601	Prey Phkoam Ka	ព្រៃផ្គាំ ក
2	21010602	Prey Phkoam Kha	ព្រៃផ្គាំ ខ
3	21010603	Prey Phkoam Ko	ព្រៃផ្គាំ គ
4	21010604	Trong Phum	ទ្រង់ភូមិ
5	21010605	Yea Ph'aeu	យាផ្អើ
6	21010606	Ta Mung	តាមូង
