= Kampong Reab Commune (Prey Kabbas District) =

Kampong Reab ឃុំកំពង់រាប
- Commune (Khum)
- Location within Cambodia
- Coordinates: 11°08′48″N 105°00′15″E
- Country: Cambodia
- Province: Takéo
- District: Prey Kabbas
- Time zone: UTC+7
- Geocode: 210606

Kampong Reab Commune (Khmer: ឃុំកំពង់រាប) is a khum (commune) in Prey Kabbas District, Takéo Province, Cambodia.

== Administration ==
As of 2019, Kampong Reab Commune has 7 phums (villages) as follows.

No.	Code	Village	Khmer
1	21060601	Peam	ពាម
2	21060602	Chumnik	ជំនីក
3	21060603	Kanhchil	កញ្ចិល
4	21060604	Kampong Leav	កំពង់លាវ
5	21060605	Kampong Reab	កំពង់រាប
6	21060606	Kampong Sama	កំពង់សាម៉
7	21060607	Klaeng Kong	ក្លែងគង់
