= Samraŏng district =

Samraong district ស្រុកសំរោង
- District (srok)
- Location in Cambodia
- Coordinates: 11°8′43″N 104°48′17″E
- Country: Cambodia
- Province: Takeo
- Communes: 11
- Villages: 147
- Time zone: UTC+7 (ICT)
- Geocode: 2107

Samraŏng (Khmer: ស្រុកសំរោង) is a district located in Takéo province, in southern Cambodia. According to the 2019 census of Cambodia, it had a population of 126,475.

== Administration ==
As of 2019, Samraŏng has 11 communes, 147 villages.

No.	Code	Commune	Khmer	Number of Villages
1	210701	Boeng Tranh Khang Cheung	ឃុំបឹងត្រាញ់ខាងជើង	9
2	210702	Boeng Tranh Khang Tboung	ឃុំបឹងត្រាញ់ខាងត្បូង	10
3	210703	Cheung Kuon	ឃុំជើងគួន	11
4	210704	Chumreah Pen	ឃុំជំរះពេន	19
5	210705	Khvav	ឃុំខ្វាវ	18
6	210706	Lumchang	ឃុំលំចង់	10
7	210707	Rovieng	ឃុំរវៀង	23
8	210708	Samraong	ឃុំសំរោង	9
9	210709	Soengh	ឃុំសឹង្ហ	14
10	210710	Sla	ឃុំស្លា	13
11	210711	Trea	ឃុំទ្រា	11
Total				147

== See also ==
- Phnom Chisor, an Angkorian site located in Samraŏng District
