= Doun Kaev municipality =

Doun Kaev municipality ក្រុងដូនកែវ Krong Doun Kaev
- Municipality
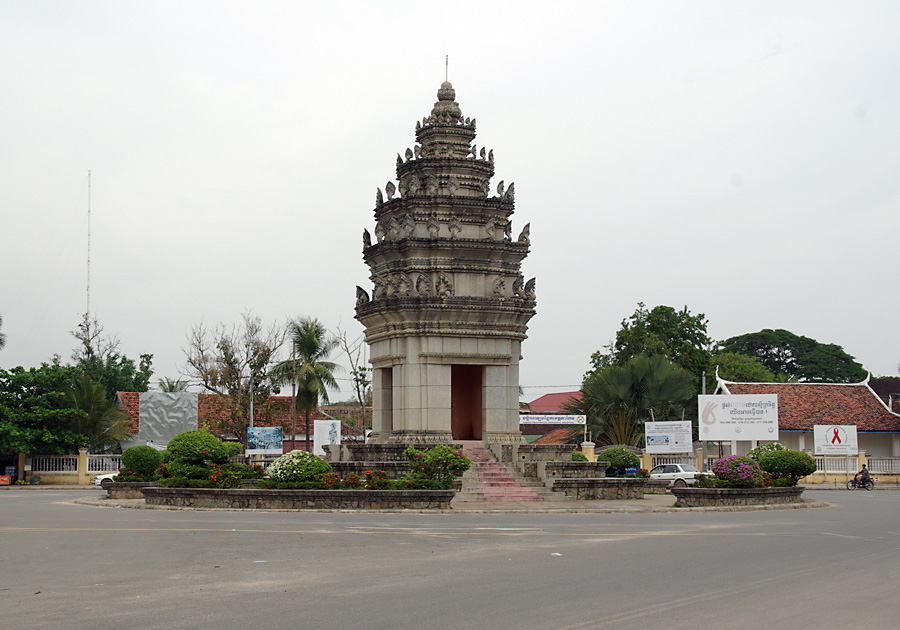

- Location in Cambodia
- Coordinates: 10°59′15″N 104°46′58″E
- Country: Cambodia
- Province: Takéo
- Quarters: 3
- Villages: 40
- Capital: Doun Kaev

Government
  - Type: City municipality

Population (2019)
  - Total: 43,402
- Time zone: UTC+7 (ICT)
- District Code: 2108

Doun Kaev municipality (Khmer: ក្រុងដូនកែវ, lit. 'Grandma Kaev') is a municipality (krong) in Takeo province, in southern Cambodia.

Krong Doun Kaev was renamed from Doun Kaev district in accordance with Sub-Decree No. 226 អនក្រ.បក dated 30 December 2008.

== Administrative divisions ==
As of 2019, Krong Doun Kaev has three sangkats (quarters) and 40 villages.

No.	Code	Sangkat	Khmer	Number of villages
1	2108-01	Baray	បារាយណ៍	14
2	2108-02	Roka Knong	រកាក្នុង	12
3	2108-03	Roka Krau	រកាក្រៅ	14
