= Bati district =

Bati ស្រុកបាទី
- District (srok)
- Location in Cambodia
- Coordinates: 11°14′35″N 104°48′43″E
- Country: Cambodia
- Province: Takeo
- Communes: 15
- Villages: 168
- Time zone: UTC+7 (ICT)
- Geocode: 2102

Bati (Khmer: ស្រុកបាទី) is a district located in Takeo province, in southern Cambodia. According to the 1998 census of Cambodia, it had a population of 113,693.

== Administration ==
As of 2019, Bati has 15 communes, 168 villages.

No.	Code	Khum (commune)	Khmer	Number of Villages
1	210201	Chambak	ឃុំចំបក់	12
2	210202	Champei	ឃុំចំប៉ី	7
3	210203	Doung	ឃុំដូង	8
4	210204	Kandoeng	ឃុំកណ្ដឹង	8
5	210205	Komar Reachea	ឃុំកុមាររាជា	13
6	210206	Krang Leav	ឃុំក្រាំងលាវ	23
7	210207	Krang Thnong	ឃុំក្រាំងធ្នង់	8
8	210208	Lumpong	ឃុំលំពង់	12
9	210209	Pea Ream	ឃុំពារាម	8
10	210210	Pot Sar	ឃុំពត់សរ	11
11	210211	Sour Phi	ឃុំសូរភី	8
12	210212	Tang Doung	ឃុំតាំងដូង	10
13	210213	Tnaot	ឃុំត្នោត	8
14	210214	Trapeang Krasang	ឃុំត្រពាំងក្រសាំង	17
15	210215	Trapeang Sab	ឃុំត្រពាំងសាប	15
Total				168

== Notable people ==
- Haing S. Ngor, Academy Award winning actor for The Killing Fields.
