= Doun Kaev district =

Doun Kaev district ស្រុកដូនកែវ
- Former district
- Country: Cambodia
- Province: Takéo
- Communes: 3
- Villages: 40

Population (1998)
  - Total: 39,186
- Time zone: UTC+7 (ICT)
- ISO 3166 code: KH-2108

Doun Kaev district (Khmer: ស្រុកដូនកែវ) is a former district of Takéo province comprising the former capital Doun Kaev.

The district was renamed to Krong Doun Kaev (Doun Kaev municipality) in accordance with Sub-Decree No. 226អនក្រ.បក dated December 30, 2008.

== Administrative divisions ==
The district had 3 communes.

	Code	Commune	Khmer
1	210801	Baray	បារាយណ៍
2	210802	Roka Knong	រកាក្នុង
3	210803	Roka Krau	រកាក្រៅ
