= Prey Kabbas District =

Prey Kabbas District ព្រៃកប្បាស
- District (Srok)
- Location in Cambodia
- Coordinates: 11°5′N 104°55′E
- Country: Cambodia
- Province: Takéo
- Communes: 13
- Villages: 110
- Time zone: UTC+07:00 (ICT)
- Geocode: 2106

Prey Kabbas (Khmer: ព្រៃកប្បាស [prɨj kap.ˈɓaːh]) is a district located in Takeo Province, in southern Cambodia. According to the 1998 census of Cambodia, it had a population of 85,880.

== Administration ==
As of 2019, Prey Kabbas District has 13 communes, 110 villages.

No.	Code	Commune	Khmer	Number of Villages
1	210601	Angkanh	ឃុំអង្កាញ់	6
2	210602	Ban Kam	ឃុំបានកាម	7
3	210603	Champa	ឃុំចំប៉ា	9
4	210604	Char	ឃុំចារ	9
5	210605	Kampeaeng	ឃុំកំពែង	9
6	210606	Kampong Reab	ឃុំកំពង់រាប	7
7	210607	Kdanh	ឃុំក្ដាញ់	7
8	210608	Pou Rumchak	ឃុំពោធិ៍រំចាក	11
9	210609	Prey Kabbas	ឃុំព្រៃកប្បាស	10
10	210610	Prey Lvea	ឃុំព្រៃល្វា	6
11	210611	Prey Phdau	ឃុំព្រៃផ្ដៅ	11
12	210612	Snao	ឃុំស្នោ	6
13	210613	Tang Yab	ឃុំតាំងយ៉ាប	12
Total				110
