= Treang District =

Treang District ស្រុកទ្រាំង
- District (srok)
- Location in Cambodia
- Coordinates: 10°54′27″N 104°46′56″E
- Country: Cambodia
- Province: Takéo
- Communes: 14
- Villages: 154

Population (1998)
  - Total: 98,386
- Time zone: +7
- Geocode: 2110

Treang District (Khmer: ស្រុកទ្រាំង) is a district located in Takéo Province, in southern Cambodia. According to the 1998 census of Cambodia, it had a population of 98,386.

== Administration ==
Treang District is divided into 14 communes, 154 villages (as of 2019).

No.	Code	Commune	Khmer	Number of Villages
1	211001	Angkanh	ឃុំអង្កាញ់	8
2	211002	Angk Khnor	ឃុំអង្គខ្នុរ	7
3	211003	Chi Khma	ឃុំជីខ្មា	10
4	211004	Khvav	ឃុំខ្វាវ	11
5	211005	Prambei Mum	ឃុំប្រាំបីមុំ	12
6	211006	Angk Kev (Angk Kaev)	ឃុំអង្គកែវ	8
7	211007	Prey Sloek	ឃុំព្រៃស្លឹក	17
8	211008	Roneam	ឃុំរនាម	11
9	211009	Sambuor	ឃុំសំបួរ	10
10	211010	Sanlong	ឃុំសន្លុង	12
11	211011	Smaong	ឃុំស្មោង	5
12	211012	Srangae (read: sra-ngae)	ឃុំស្រង៉ែ	15
13	211013	Thlok	ឃុំធ្លក	18
14	211014	Tralach	ឃុំត្រឡាច	10
Total	14			154
