= Rovieng Commune =

Rovieng ឃុំរវៀង
- Commune (Khum)
- Location within Cambodia
- Coordinates: 11°11′28″N 104°48′02″E
- Country: Cambodia
- Province: Takéo
- District: Samraŏng
- Time zone: UTC+7
- Geocode: 210707

Rovieng Commune (Khmer: ឃុំរវៀង) is a khum (commune) in Samraŏng District, Takéo Province, Cambodia.

== Administration ==
As of 2019, Rovieng Commune has 23 phums (villages) as follows.

No.	Code	Village	Khmer
1	21070701	Trapeang Khnar	ត្រពាំងខ្នារ
2	21070702	Kok Ta Rie	កុកតារៀ
3	21070703	Trapeang Trea	ត្រពាំងទ្រា
4	21070704	Tuek Ambel	ទឹកអំបិល
5	21070705	Prey Khcheay	ព្រៃខ្ជាយ
6	21070706	Taol	តោល
7	21070707	Thmei	ថ្មី
8	21070708	Rovieng	រវៀង
9	21070709	Krang Leav	ក្រាំងលាវ
10	21070710	Trapeang Chhuk	ត្រពាំងឈូក
11	21070711	Trapeang Stong	ត្រពាំងស្ទង
12	21070712	Trapeang Veng (~Veaeng)	ត្រពាំងវែង
13	21070713	Chanloat Dai	ចន្លាត់ដៃ
14	21070714	Sramaoch Haer	ស្រមោចហែរ
15	21070715	Trapeang Sdok	ត្រពាំងស្ដុក
16	21070716	Kruos	គ្រួស
17	21070717	Dak Por	ដក់ពរ
18	21070718	Kandal	កណ្ដាល
19	21070719	Krang Thnong	ក្រាំងធ្នង់
20	21070720	Prey Snuol	ព្រៃស្នួល
21	21070721	Veay Chhneah	វាយឈ្នះ
22	21070722	Char	ចារ
23	21070723	Daeum Thlok	ដើមធ្លក
