= Chey Chouk Commune =

Chey Chouk ឃុំជ័យជោគ
- Commune (Khum)
- Location within Cambodia
- Coordinates: 10°42′16″N 105°02′42″E
- Country: Cambodia
- Province: Takéo
- District: Bourei Cholsar
- Time zone: UTC+7
- Geocode: 210302

Chey Chouk Commune (Khmer: ឃុំជ័យជោគ) is a khum (commune) in Bourei Cholsar District, Takéo Province, Cambodia.

== Administration ==
As of 2019, Chey Chouk Commune has 7 phums (villages) as follows.

No.	Code	Village	Khmer
1	21030201	Sangkae Chuor	សង្កែជួរ
2	21030202	Chey Chouk	ជ័យជោគ
3	21030203	Kouk Panhchar	គោកបញ្ចារ
4	21030204	Anhchanh	អញ្ចាញ
5	21030205	Dei Leuk	ដីលើក
6	21030206	Dara Kom	តារាគមន៍
7	21030207	Banteay Sloek	បន្ទាយស្លឹក
