= Kiri Vong District =

Kiri Vong គីរីវង់
- District (Srok)
- Location in Cambodia
- Coordinates: 10°38′59″N 104°52′17″E
- Country: Cambodia
- Province: Takéo
- Communes: 12
- Villages: 115
- Time zone: UTC+07:00 (ICT)
- Geocode: 2104

Kiri Vong (Khmer: គីរីវង់ [ki.ˈriː ʋɔŋ]) is a district located in Takeo Province, in southern Cambodia. According to the 1998 census of Cambodia, it had a population of 92,446.

== Administration ==
As of 2019, Kiri Vong District has 12 communes, 115 villages.

No.	Code	Commune	Khmer	Number of Villages
1	210401	Angk Prasat	ឃុំអង្គប្រាសាទ	10
2	210402	Preah Bat Choan Chum	ឃុំព្រះបាទជាន់ជុំ	9
3	210403	Kamnab	ឃុំកំណប់	6
4	210404	Kampeaeng	ឃុំកំពែង	13
5	210405	Kiri Chong Kaoh	ឃុំគីរីចុងកោះ	6
6	210406	Kouk Prech	ឃុំគោកព្រេច	13
7	210407	Phnum Den	ឃុំភ្នំដិន	9
8	210408	Prey Ampok	ឃុំព្រៃអំពក	9
9	210409	Prey Rumdeng	ឃុំព្រៃរំដេង	11
10	210410	Ream Andaeuk	ឃុំរាមអណ្ដើក	8
11	210411	Saom Commune	ឃុំសោម	12
12	210412	Ta Our	ឃុំតាអូរ	9
