= Angkor Borei District =

Angkor Borei អង្គរបូរី
- District
- Angkor Borei District ស្រុកអង្គរបូរី
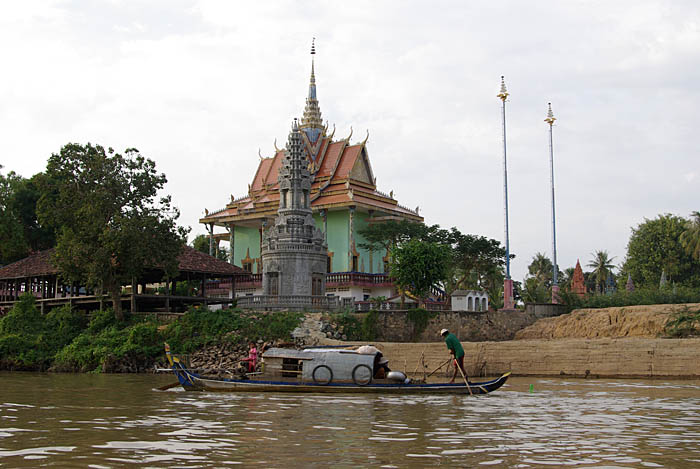

- Location in Cambodia
- Coordinates: 10°59′42″N 104°58′29″E
- Country: Cambodia
- Province: Takéo
- Time zone: UTC+7 (ICT)
- ISO 3166 code: KH-2101

Angkor Borei (Khmer: អង្គរបូរី) is a district located in Takéo Province, in southern Cambodia. According to the 1998 census of Cambodia, it had a population of 44,980.

== Administration ==
The district has 6 communes and 34 villages as of 2019.

No.	Code	Commune	Khmer	Number of Villages
1	210101	Angkor Borei Commune	ឃុំអង្គរបូរី	6
2	210102	Ba Srae Commune	ឃុំបាស្រែ	8
3	210103	Kouk Thlok Commune	ឃុំគោកធ្លក	4
4	210104	Ponley Commune	ឃុំពន្លៃ	6
5	210105	Prek Phtoul Commune (Preaek Phtoul)	ឃុំព្រែកផ្ទោល	4
6	210106	Prey Phkoam Commune	ឃុំព្រៃផ្គាំ	6
Total				34

== History ==
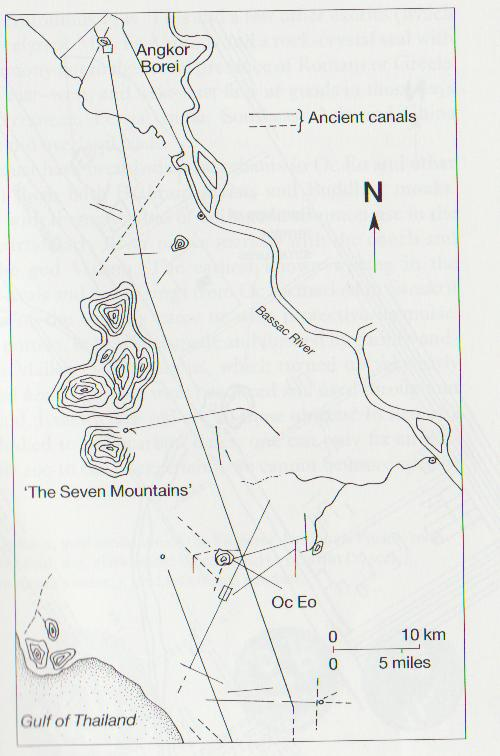
The ancient canal linking Angkor Borei to Óc Eo

This city was a settlement of the Kingdom of Funan and may have been its capital. It may have been the Thinae, or Sinae Metropolis located by Claudius Ptolemy as the furthest known city to the east in his Geography. The site was first excavated in 1996 and was again excavated in 1999 as part of the Lower Mekong Archaeological Project. During the 1996 excavation, the University of Hawaii and the Royal University of Fine Arts initiated the excavation and focused on the sociopolitical complexity from 500 BC to 500 AD. This first excavation was preliminary research. The first objectives were:

1) Documentation of the site's layout and the range of its archaeological features

2) Evaluation of the integrity of subsurface materials and description of the site's stratigraphy

3) Collection of samples for dating portions of the archaeological site

4) Reconstructing the hydrology and natural environment of the early historic period in this region

In this site archaeological methods were used such as surface survey and mapping, test excavations, auger sampling and coring, and trenching with a backhoe.

The archeological project was disturbed by looting and illicit trafficking of Khmer antiquities, which continues to be a problem into the 21st century.
