= Kaoh Andaet District =

Kaoh Andaet District ស្រុកកោះអណ្តែត Koh Andet
- District (srok)
- Location in Cambodia
- Coordinates: 10°47′53″N 104°57′11″E
- Country: Cambodia
- Province: Takeo
- Communes: 6
- Villages: 68
- Time zone: UTC+7 (ICT)
- Geocode: 2105

Kaoh Andaet District (Khmer: ស្រុកកោះអណ្ដែត) is a district located in Takeo Province, in southern Cambodia. According to the 1998 census of Cambodia, it had a population of 45,650.

== Administration ==
As of 2019, Kaoh Andaet District has 6 communes, 68 villages.

No.	Code	Commune	Khmer	Number of Villages
1	210501	Krapum Chhuk	ឃុំក្រពុំឈូក	13
2	210502	Pech Sar	ឃុំពេជសារ	17
3	210503	Prey Khla	ឃុំព្រៃខ្លា	15
4	210504	Prey Yuthka	ឃុំព្រៃយុថ្កា	6
5	210505	Romenh	ឃុំរមេញ	10
6	210506	Thlea Prachum	ឃុំធ្លាប្រជុំ	7
Total				68
