= Bourei Cholsar District =

Bourei Cholsar ស្រុកបូរីជលសារ
- District (srok)
- Location in Cambodia
- Coordinates: 10°50′4″N 105°1′7″E
- Country: Cambodia
- Province: Takeo
- Communes: 5
- Villages: 39
- Time zone: UTC+7 (ICT)
- Geocode: 2103

Bourei Cholsar District (Khmer: ស្រុកបូរីជលសារ) is a district located in Takeo Province, in southern Cambodia. According to the 1998 census of Cambodia, it had a population of 24,460.

== Administration ==
As of 2019, Bourei Cholsar District has 5 communes, 39 villages.

No.	Code	Commune	Khmer	Number of Villages
1	210301	Bourei Cholsar Commune	ឃុំបូរីជលសារ	7
2	210302	Chey Chouk Commune	ឃុំជ័យជោគ	7
3	210303	Daungkpus Commune	ឃុំដូងខ្ពស់	12
4	210304	Kampong Krasang Commune	ឃុំកំពង់ក្រសាំង	5
5	210305	Kouk Pou Commune	ឃុំគោកពោធិ៍	8
Total				39
