= Doun Kaev (town) =

Doun Kaev ដូនកែវ
- City
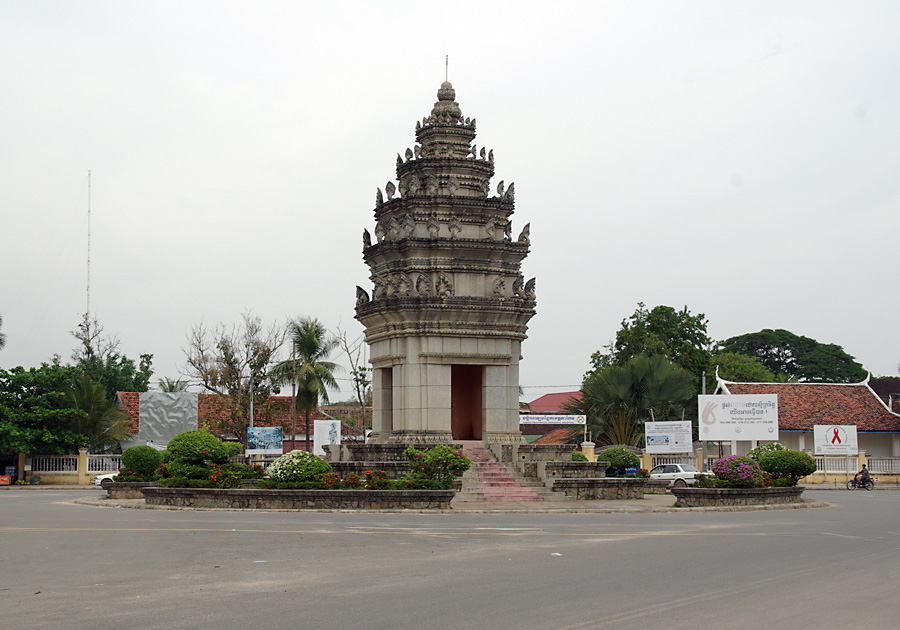
- Independence Monument in Doun Kaev

- Location within Cambodia
- Coordinates: 10°59′N 104°47′E
- Country: Cambodia
- Province: Takéo
- Municipality: Doun Kaev

Population (2019)
  - Total: 43,402
- Time zone: UTC+7 (ICT)

Doun Kaev (Khmer: ដូនកែវ [doun kaew]; lit. "Crystal Grandmother") is the capital of Takéo Province, Cambodia. In 2019 it had a population of 43,402 which had increased from 1998. The small city and province is known for silk weaving, and the province is home to about 10,000 of the total of 15,000 Cambodian weavers. Most silk weavers in the villages are near the national highway in the direction of Takéo town. The technique of silk weaving could have come to the Khmer during the Kingdom of Funan, probably in the 2nd century, from India and China.

== Climate ==
Climate data for Doun Kaev (1982–2024)
Month	Jan	Feb	Mar	Apr	May	Jun	Jul	Aug	Sep	Oct	Nov	Dec	Year
Mean daily maximum °C (°F)	31.3 (88.3)	31.6 (88.9)	32.9 (91.2)	34.6 (94.3)	34.9 (94.8)	33.7 (92.7)	33.6 (92.5)	32.8 (91.0)	32.0 (89.6)	31.6 (88.9)	31.0 (87.8)	30.8 (87.4)	32.6 (90.6)
Mean daily minimum °C (°F)	21.4 (70.5)	22.6 (72.7)	23.8 (74.8)	24.2 (75.6)	24.6 (76.3)	23.9 (75.0)	23.4 (74.1)	23.6 (74.5)	23.9 (75.0)	23.1 (73.6)	22.4 (72.3)	21.8 (71.2)	23.2 (73.8)
Average precipitation mm (inches)	2.3 (0.09)	10.5 (0.41)	47.2 (1.86)	86.0 (3.39)	106.4 (4.19)	128.3 (5.05)	120.9 (4.76)	139.0 (5.47)	242.5 (9.55)	238.1 (9.37)	119.7 (4.71)	15.3 (0.60)	1,256.2 (49.45)
Source: World Meteorological Organization

== Notable people ==
- Pen Sovan (1936–2016), former Prime Minister of Cambodia
- Chinary Ung (born 1942), composer
