= Takéo province =

Province of Cambodia

Takéo Province ខេត្តតាកែវ
- Province

Khmer transcription(s)
  - Khmer: ខេត្តតាកែវ
  - UNGEGN: Khaet Ta Kaew
  - ALA-LC: Khett Tā Kaev
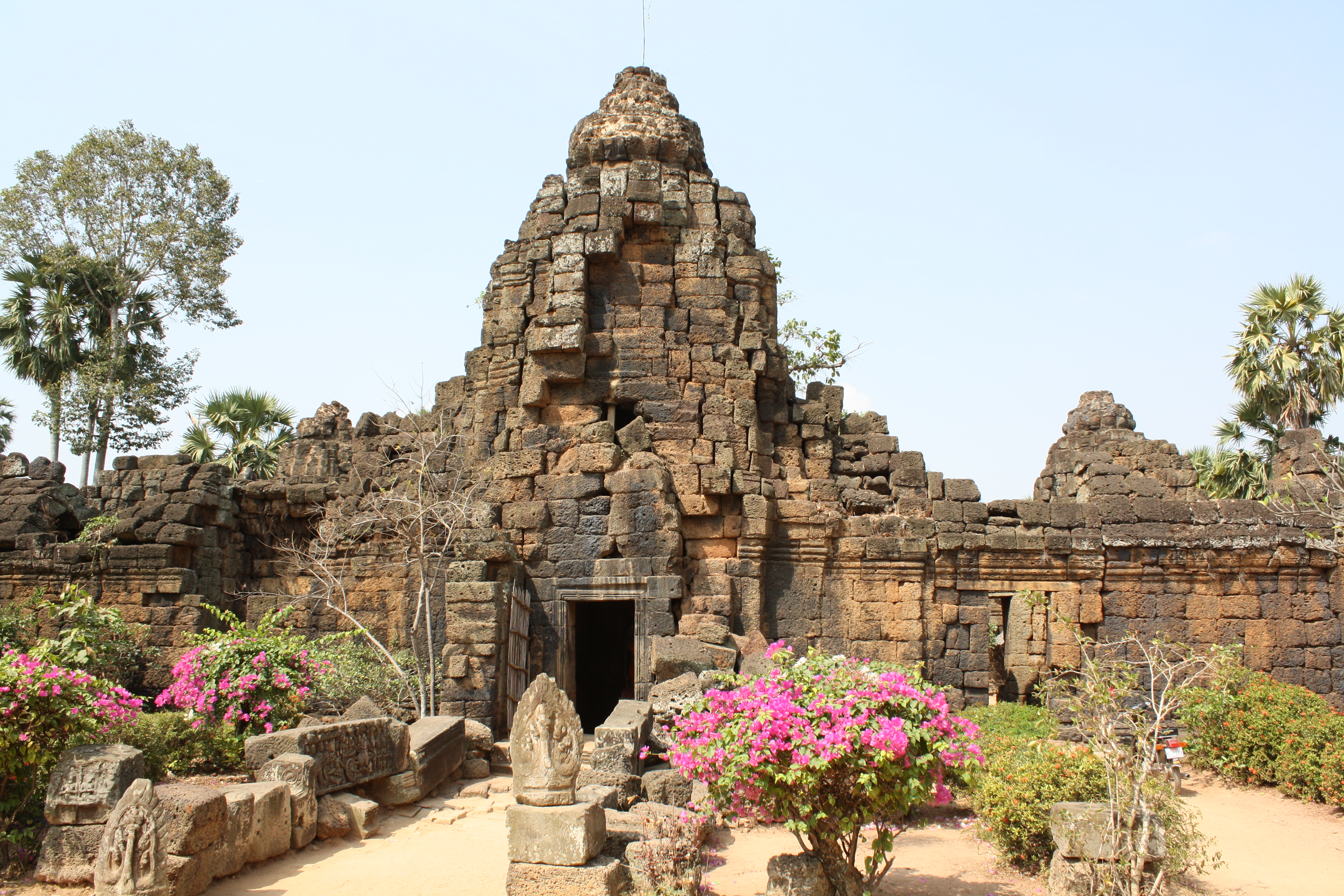
- Temple in Takéo

- Seal

- Map of Cambodia highlighting Takeo
- Coordinates: 010°59′N 104°47′E
- Country: Cambodia
- Provincial status: 1907
- Capital: Doun Kaev

Government
  - Governor: Vey Samnang

Area
  - Total: 3,563 km^{2} (1,376 sq mi)
  - Rank: Ranked 20th

Population (2024)
  - Total: ▲1,097,243
  - Rank: 6th
  - Density: 252/km^{2} (650/sq mi)
  - Rank: 3rd
- Time zone: UTC+7 (ICT)
- Dialing code: +855
- ISO 3166 code: KH-21
- Districts: 10
- Communes: 100
- Villages: 1117
- HDI (2017): 0.612 medium · 2nd
- Website: takeo.gov.kh

Takéo Province (Khmer: ខេត្តតាកែវ, Khaet Ta Kaew, [taː kaew]; lit. 'grandpa Kéo') is a province of Cambodia. Located in the south of Cambodia to the west of Bassac River, Takéo borders the provinces of Kampot to the west, Kampong Speu to the northwest and Kandal to the north and east. Its southern boundary is the international border with Vietnam (An Giang).

== Administration ==
As of 2019, the province has 9 districts and 1 municipality, 97 communes and 3 sangkats and 1,119 villages.

Previously, before Doun Kaev District was renamed to Krong Doun Kaev, the province was subdivided into 10 districts, 100 communes and 1,117 villages.

ISO code	District	Khmer
21-01	Angkor Borei	ស្រុកអង្គរបូរី
21-02	Bati	ស្រុកបាទី
21-03	Bourei Cholsar	ស្រុកបូរីជលសារ
21-04	Kiri Vong	ស្រុកគិរីវង់
21-05	Koh Andaet	ស្រុកកោះអណ្ដែត
21-06	Prey Kabbas	ស្រុកព្រៃកប្បាស
21-07	Samraŏng	ស្រុកសំរោង
21-08	Doun Kaev Municipality	ក្រុងដូនកែវ
21-09	Tram Kak	ស្រុកត្រាំកក់
21-10	Treang	ស្រុកទ្រាំង

== Religion ==
Religion in Takeo (2019 census)
1. Buddhism (99.2%)
2. Islam (0.60%)
3. Christianity (0.10%)
4. Animism and Other religions (0.00%)
