= Krol Ko =

Buddhist temple

- ក្រោលគោ
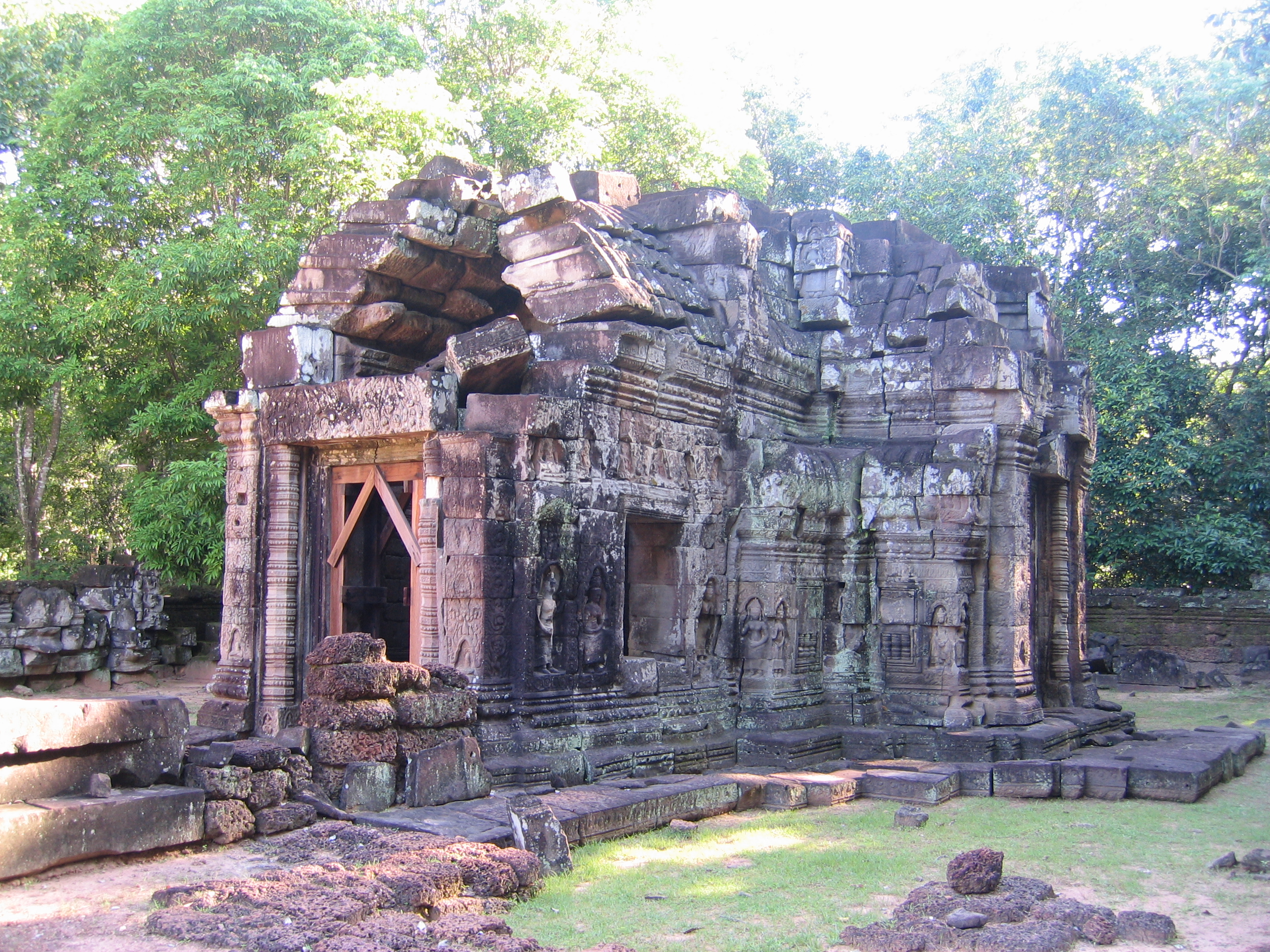
- Outside of the temple.

- Location within Cambodia

Religion
- Affiliation: Buddhism
- Province: Siem Reap

Location
- Country: Cambodia
- Interactive map of Krol Ko
- Coordinates: 13°28′06″N 103°53′34″E

Architecture
- Style: Khmer
- Founder: Jayavarman VII
- Completed: 12th century

Krol Ko (Khmer: ក្រោលគោ, Kraôl Koŭ [kraol koː]) at Angkor, Cambodia, is a Buddhist temple built at the end of the 12th century under the rule of Jayavarman VII, in his Bayon architectural style. It is north of Neak Pean. The name 'Krol Ko' is a modern term meaning 'The Park of the Oxen' and likely has no connection to its historical use.

While speculative, it may have served as a chapel at a hospital site, as its layout is identical to the four hospital chapels found outside Angkor Thom (the 'Chapel of the Hospital' to the east, Ta Prohm Kel to the south, Tonle Sgnout to the north, and another site now in ruins to the west). Placement of a hospital close to Neak Pean would have made sense as Neak Pean was constructed as a representation of the waters of the mythical lake Anavatapta, which were thought to help the attainment of salvation amongst those deceased. Seven of the temple pediments at Krol Ko feature Lokeshvara, a boddhisattva who, in Khmer Buddhist belief, was entrusted with healing powers. Lokeshvara is commonly associated with hospitals.

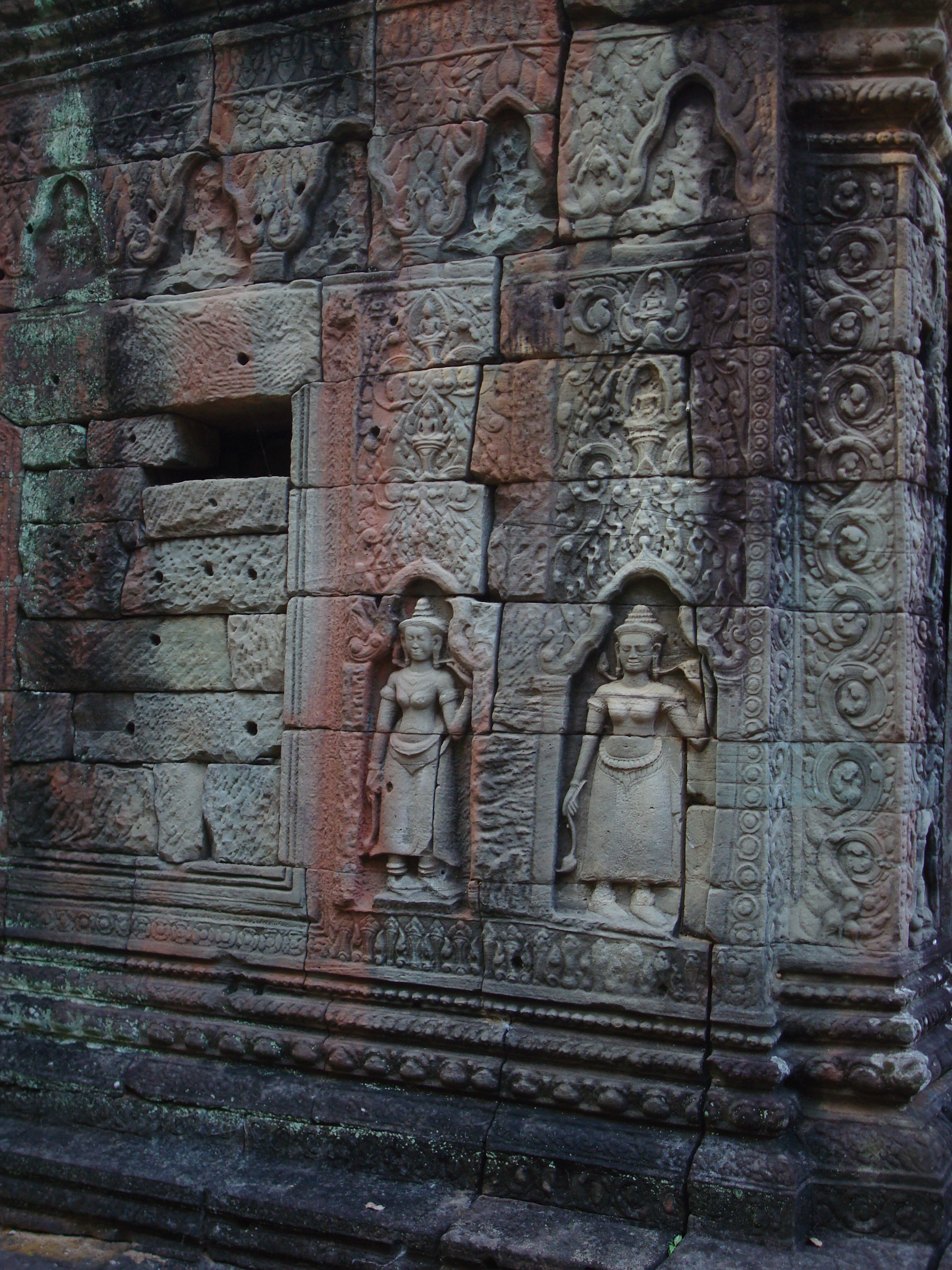
Krol Ko

An interesting feature of Krol Ko is that while it was built as a Buddhist temple, it contains reliefs depicting a scene from the Hindu Puranas, which are medieval Hindu scriptures more contemporary than the classical Rigvedas. The left of the building shows Krishna raising the hill Govardhana to shelter shepherds and their flocks from a thunderstorm raised by Indra. This relatively contemporary Purana-Govardhana story displays Indra's submission to Krishna, despite Indra being viewed as the supreme deity in the Rigvedas. In Buddhism, Indra remained as the superior deity and was even venerated as a protector of the Buddhist faith whilst worship amongst the Hindu population shifted towards Shiva, Durga, Vishnu and Krishna since the medieval period. It is therefore striking that the Govardhana tale, a tale that tells of Indra's inferiority to Krishna, is depicted in an otherwise Buddhist temple. This indicates a lack of rivalry between the Buddhist and Hindu populations residing within Angkor, contrary to India, where Buddhism was deemed as heretical amongst many Hindus due to its renunciation of the caste system. The caste system was never entirely adopted by the Khmer civilization and other South-East Asian civilizations.

The approximate location of the site is 13.468189' N, 103.895401' E (WGS 84 map datum).
