= Snoeng Temples =

Temple complex in Cambodia

Prasat Sneung Complex
- ប្រាសាទស្នឹង (Khmer)
- Location in Cambodia
- 12°57′54″N 103°03′04″E
- Cultures: Khmer Empire
- Location: Snoeng, Banan district, Battambang, Cambodia

Site notes
- Architectural style: Khmer

Snoeng Temples, (Note: Alternatively Snung, Sneng or Stung Temples, original name is unknown.) known locally as Prasat Sneung (Khmer: ប្រាសាទស្នឹង, lit. 'Snoeng Temple'), refers to the remains of two ancient Hindu Khmer temples: Snoeng East Temple (Prasat Snoeng Khang Khaeut) and Snoeng West Temple (Prasat Snoeng Khang Lech), separated by 200 metres within the compound of Wat Snung. Located in the Snoeng commune of Battambang province in Cambodia, both the temples were built in different eras around 11th and 12th centuries, with the western one being newer. The complex is located approximately 22 kilometres southwest of Battambang city.

== History ==
Both temples were constructed during the Khmer period but reflect different architectural styles because they were built in different eras within that time period, with the East Temple being made when Battambang played an important role in the Khmer Empire. The eastern temple has inscriptions in Sanskrit and Khmer about some important officials under Suryavarman I, and emphasises on a district called 'Sruk Chrei Pak Sneng' thus suggesting that 'Snoeng' could have derived from 'Sneng'. The western temple has no inscription, making it difficult to determine when it was constructed. The earliest modern record of the temple dates to 1911, when Lunet de Lajonquière listed it as 867th in his ancient list. The eastern temple is estimated to have been built in the 11th century, during the reign of either Suryavarman I or his son Udayadityavarman II.

== Temples ==
The East Temple is located opposite Wat Sneung, a modern pagoda, near a pond in the backyard, whereas the West Temple is situated at the northwestern border of Wat Sneung. Over the years, the temples have been damaged and its elements scattered around the region. In 2020, the provincial department collected 67 pieces of the Snoeng temple, storing them near the West Temple, hoping to restore them in the future when the budget is allocated to do so.

=== Snoeng East Temple ===
East Sneong Temple
- ប្រាសាទស្នឹងខាងខឿត (Khmer); Prasat Snoeng Khang Khaeut
- Snoeng East Temple's three tower remains
- Interactive map of East Sneong Temple
- 12°57′53.5″N 103°03′07.5″E

History
- Built: c. 11th Century
- Built by: Suryavarman I/Udayadityavarman II

Snoeng East Temple, known locally as Prasat Snoeng Khang Khaeut, is a complex of three distinct tower remains made of bricks on a laterite slab, aligned on the north–south axis with all having an entrance facing east. The trio share a common terrace, each having an extended entrance with a sandstone doorframe and are situated on top of a hill. The center tower is the largest of the three, possessing octagonal, decorated door columns which support its decorative lintel in situ. The temple towers are surrounded by pedestals and elements, especially those of Crown. The dimensions of the eastern block is 30m in length and 20m in width and features a structure similar to other temples from the 12th century. A large lintel on the door shows Indra sitting on his three-headed elephant Airavata next to Rahu, with foliage differing from those of the early and late 12th century, making it likely to have been built it during the early 11th century under Suryavarman I who was local ruler then. (Note: The lintel's foliage-heavy style is debated.) Kim Sophoan, director of the Department of Culture and Fine Arts for Battambang province, claims that the East Temple was built in the 11th century during the reign of King Udayadityavarman II, whose reign lasted from 1050 to 1066.

=== Snoeng West Temple ===
West Sneong Temple
- ប្រាសាទស្នឹងខាងលិច (Khmer); Prasat Snoeng Khang Lech
- Interactive map of West Sneong Temple
- 12°57′55.6″N 103°03′02″E

History
- Built: c. 12th Century
- Built by: Unknown

Snoeng West Temple, known locally as Prasat Snoeng Khang Lech, refers to the remains of the partially collapsed sandstone temple situated at the northwestern border of Wat Sneung. Unlike the East Temple remains, the West Temple remains are located next to the National Road 57 and has a door on all four sides, three of which are false, with the only original being the one that faces to the east, connected to the ardhamandapa. It has relatively well-preserved lintels in situ. Each door (both false and real), except the north-pointing one, has carvings of figures in two registers (bands) over it, as per the following:

Lintels above Snoeng West Temple doors
| Direction the door faces | Carving |
|---|---|
| East (North) | Churning of the Sea of Milk |
| East (South) (Note: False door) | Mahabharata dice game scene (Note: The upper one features characters on central stage, while the bottom one features other characters, including three lions holding center stage.) |
| West | Vishnu on Ananta, (Note: Étienne Aymonier states that Vishnu is on a reachsey instead.) Birth of Brahma |

The door facing north has a plain board because the carving was intended but was not started, indicating with other evidence that the temple is not fully constructed. The lintels do not have foliage, unlike other Angkorian period (c. 800AD-1431) lintels and the East Temple.

The temple could not be entered because of large stones that have fallen inside as a result of its roof collapse, however it is still worshipped by the locals like other ancient temples. Due to damage caused by nature and war, it is difficult to identify the temple's construction time, also because that the temple's stone pieces were scattered for a long time. Some stones may have been taken off the temple during the Khmer Rouge regime to build granaries for storing rice.

Around the site there are many related stones, with further excavation finding few pieces of laterite, pedestal, crown elements, and many plinths.
