= Ta Nei =

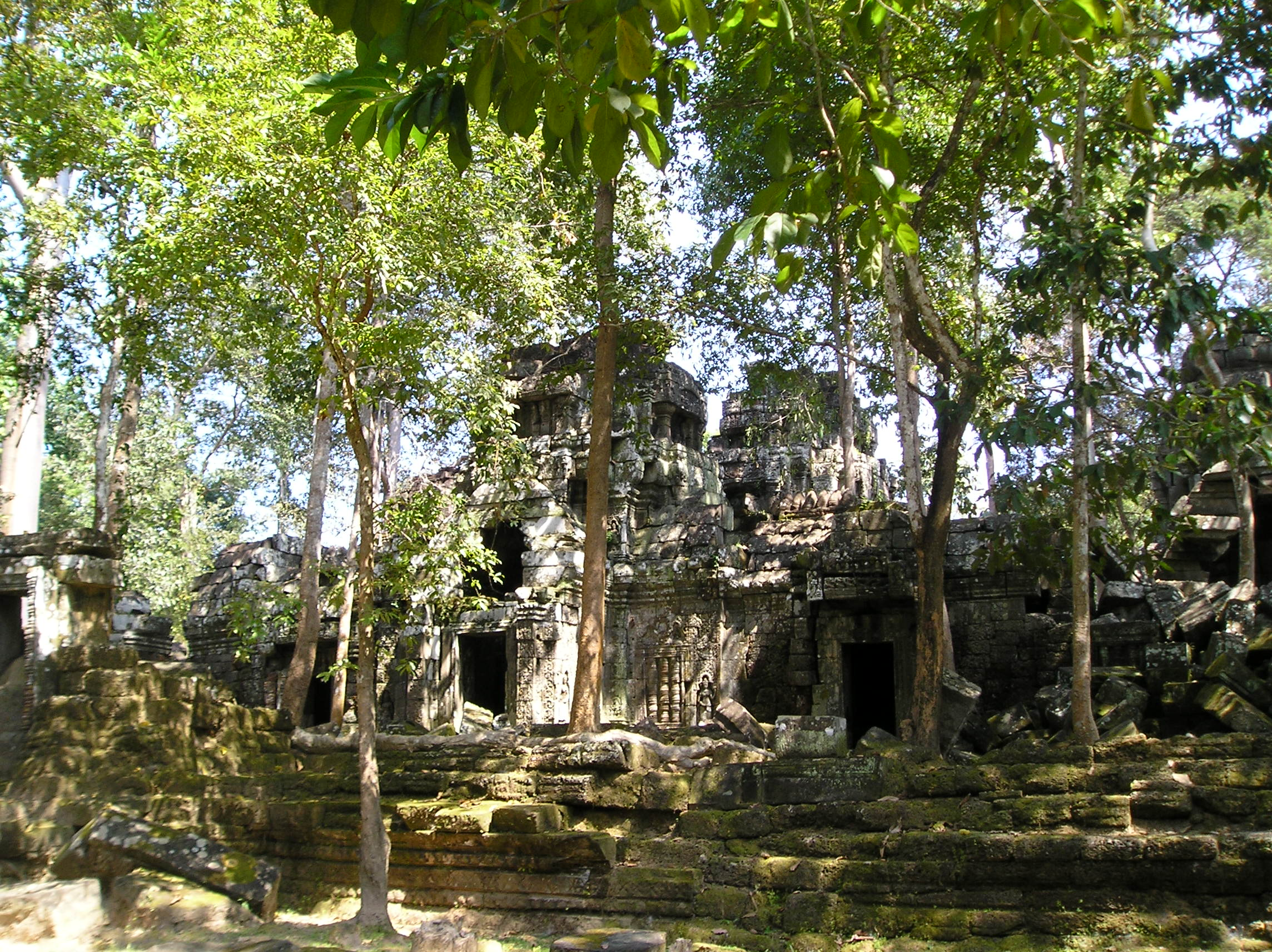
- The main temple complex

- Location within Cambodia

Religion
- Affiliation: Hinduism other_info =: Sect: [[{{{sect}}}]]
- Province: Siem Reap

Location
- Location: Angkor
- Country: Cambodia
- Interactive map of Ta Nei
- Coordinates: 13°27′09″N 103°53′06″E

Architecture
- Type: Khmer (Bayon style)
- Creator: Jayavarman VII, enlarged by Indravarman II
- Completed: Late 12th century AD

Ta Nei (Khmer: ប្រាសាទតានៃ) is a late 12th century stone temple in Angkor, Cambodia. Built during the reign of King Jayavarman VII, it is near the northwest corner of the East Baray, a large holy reservoir.

== Plan ==
Ta Nei was extended initially toward the east and then enlarged with three small gopuras on the north, west and south and a large east gopura that is essentially a part of the inner, galleried enclosure. As at Ta Prohm, city walls were begun but were probably never finished. Today only two outer gopuras exist to the west and east.

The length of the urban enclosure was 190m. Inside are two long, narrow tank moats on the north and south. The original east gopura now stands isolated, and the original northeast and southeast corner towers are now part of the gallery.

There is a small library near the south side and a chamber connects the sanctuary to the north gopura.

== Gallery ==
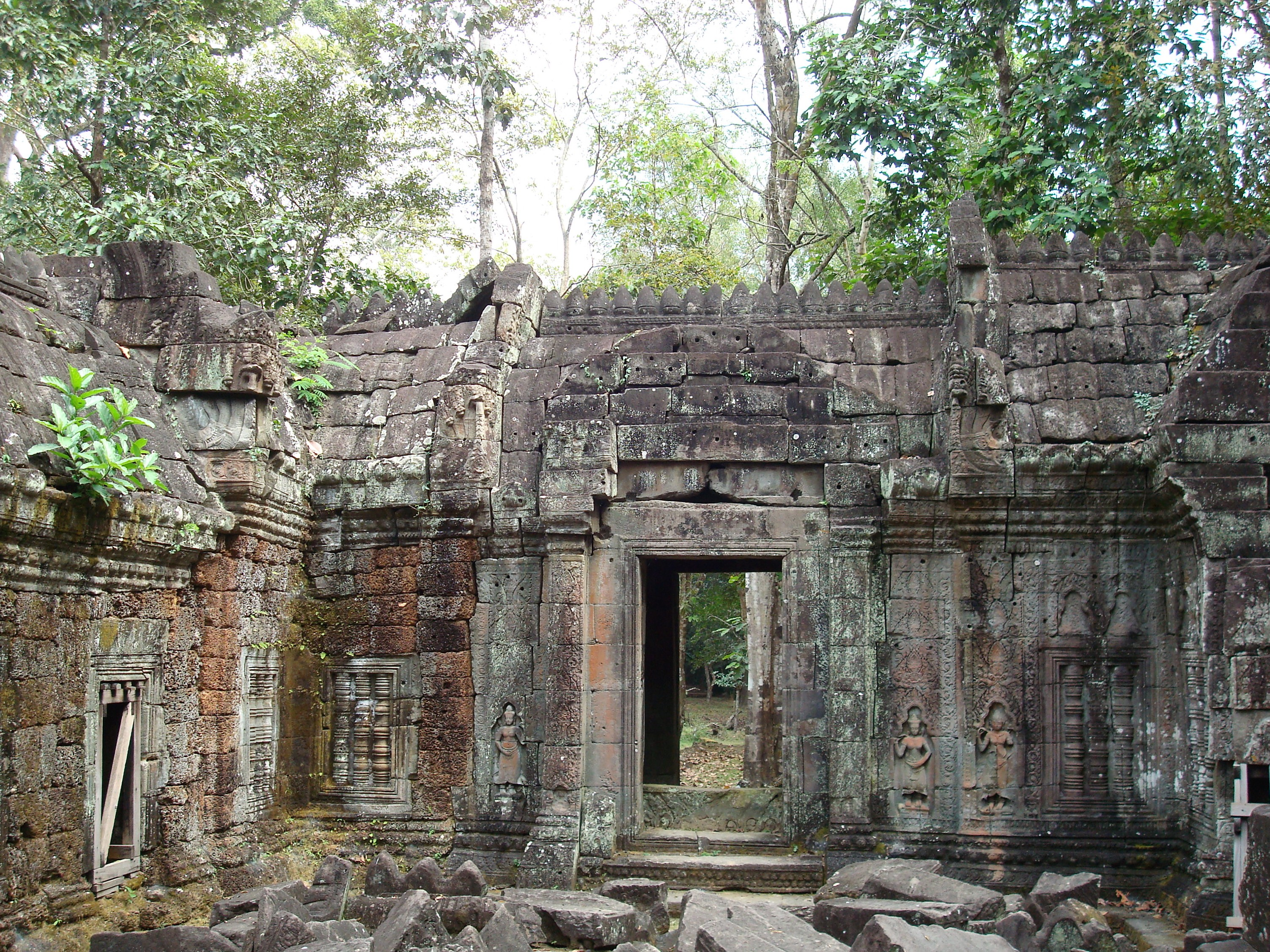

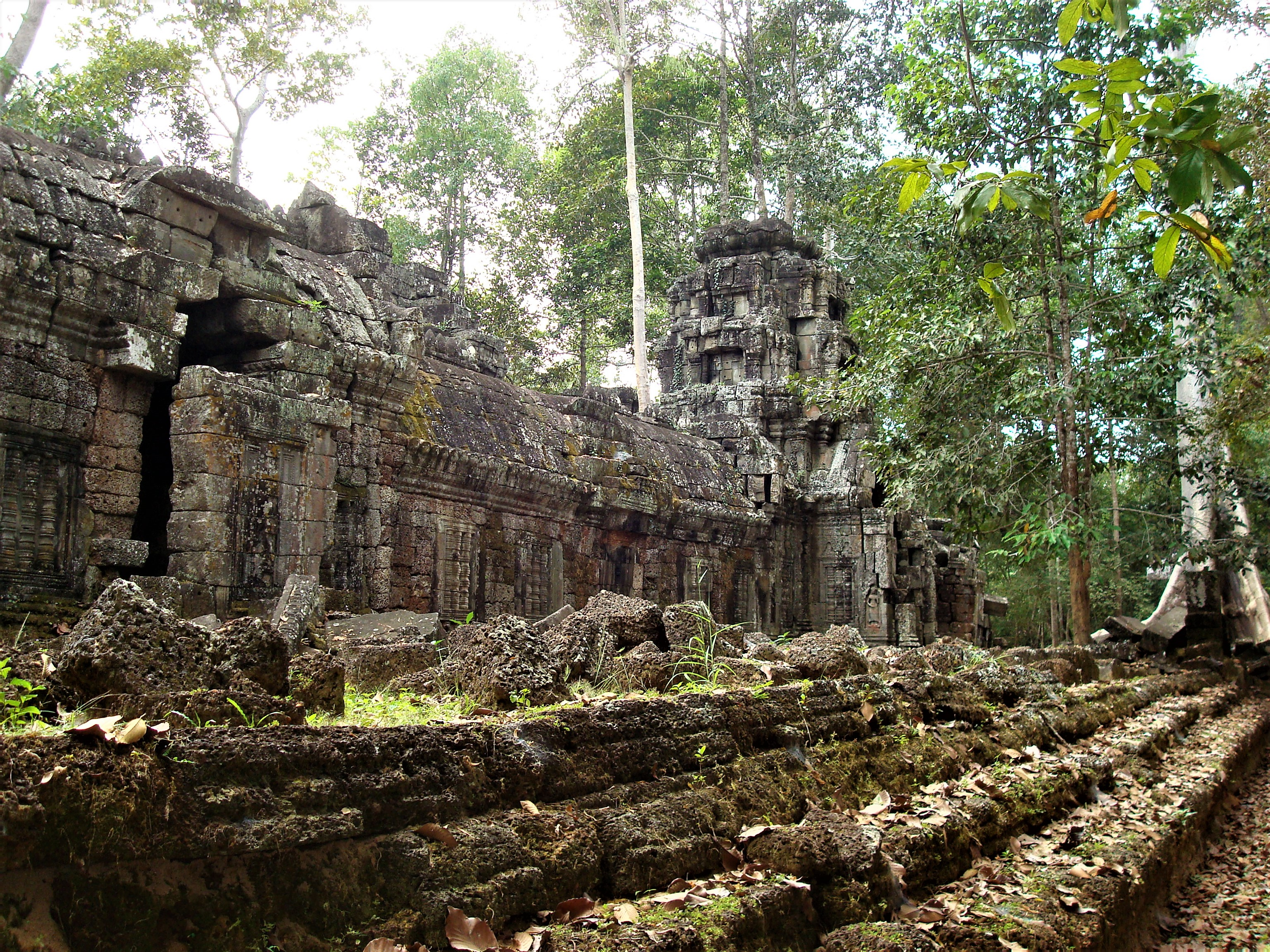

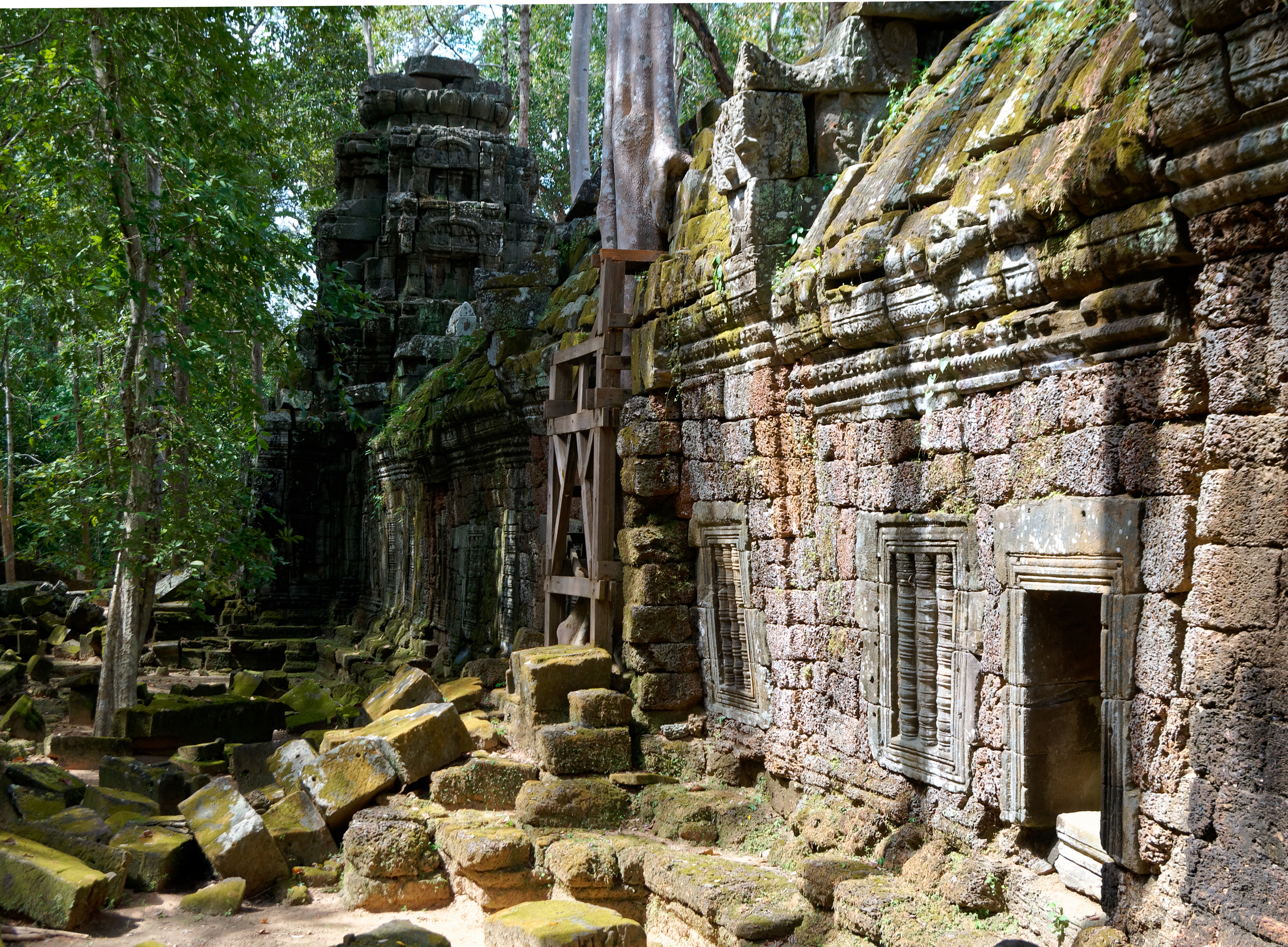

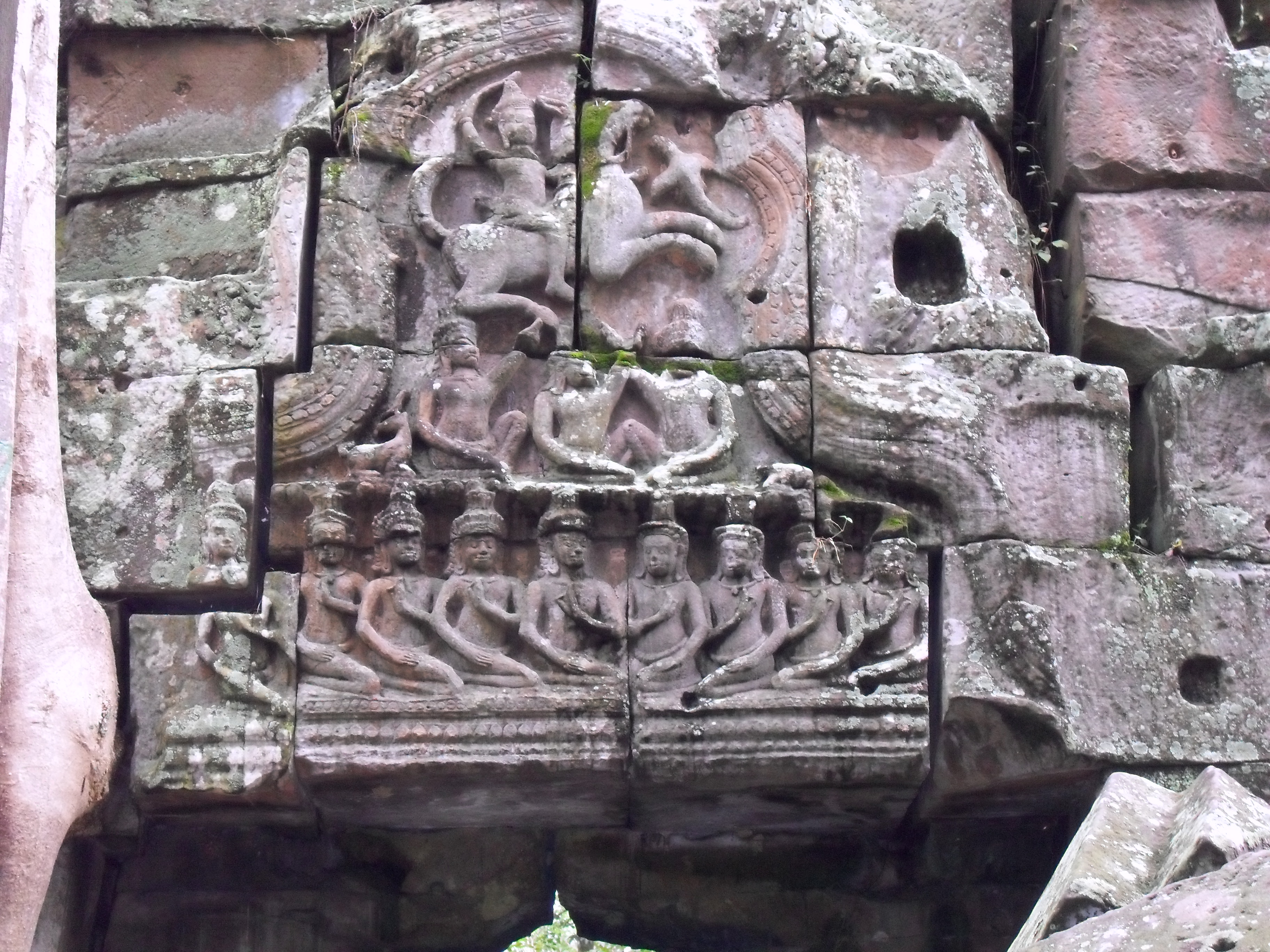

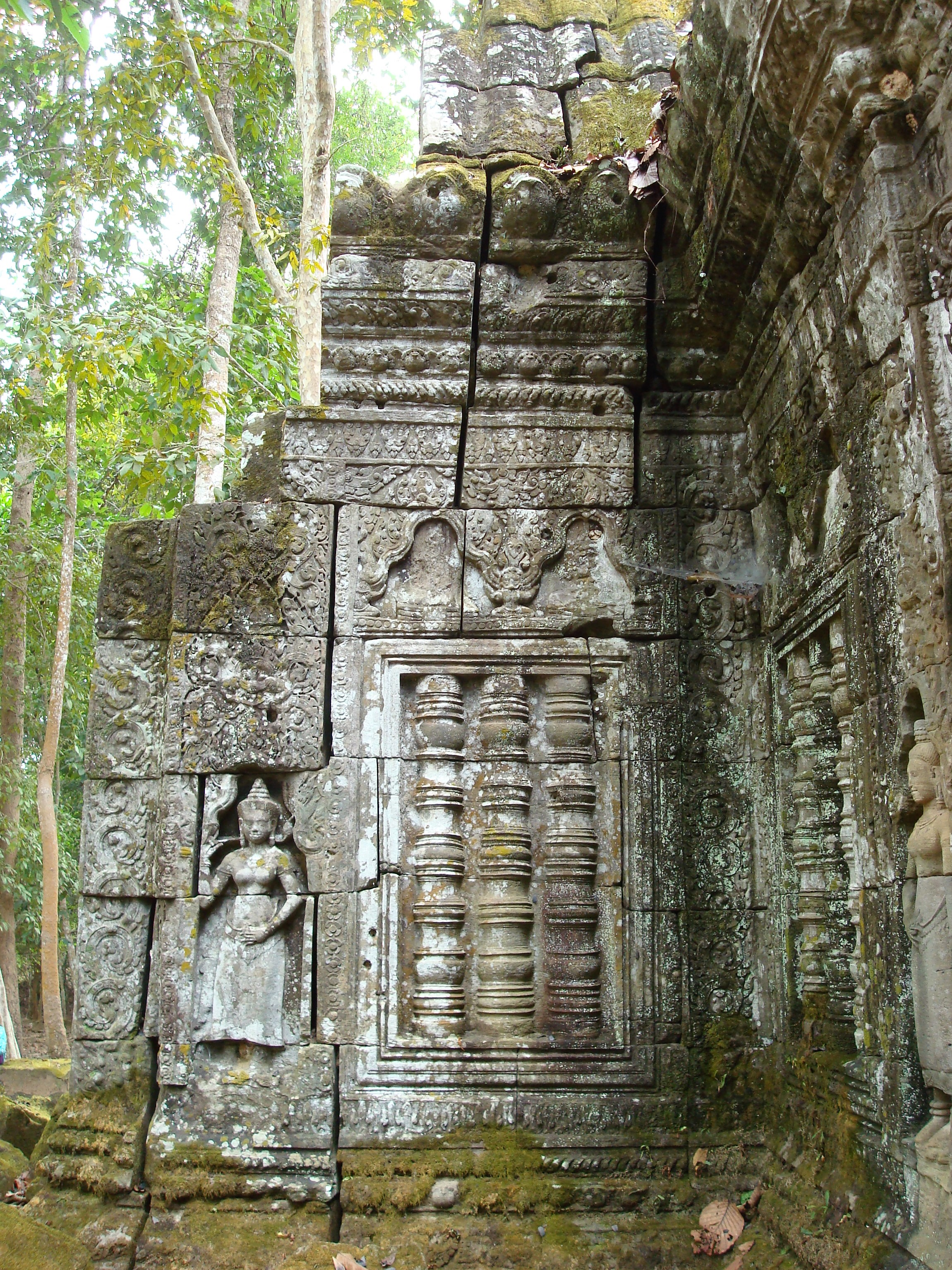

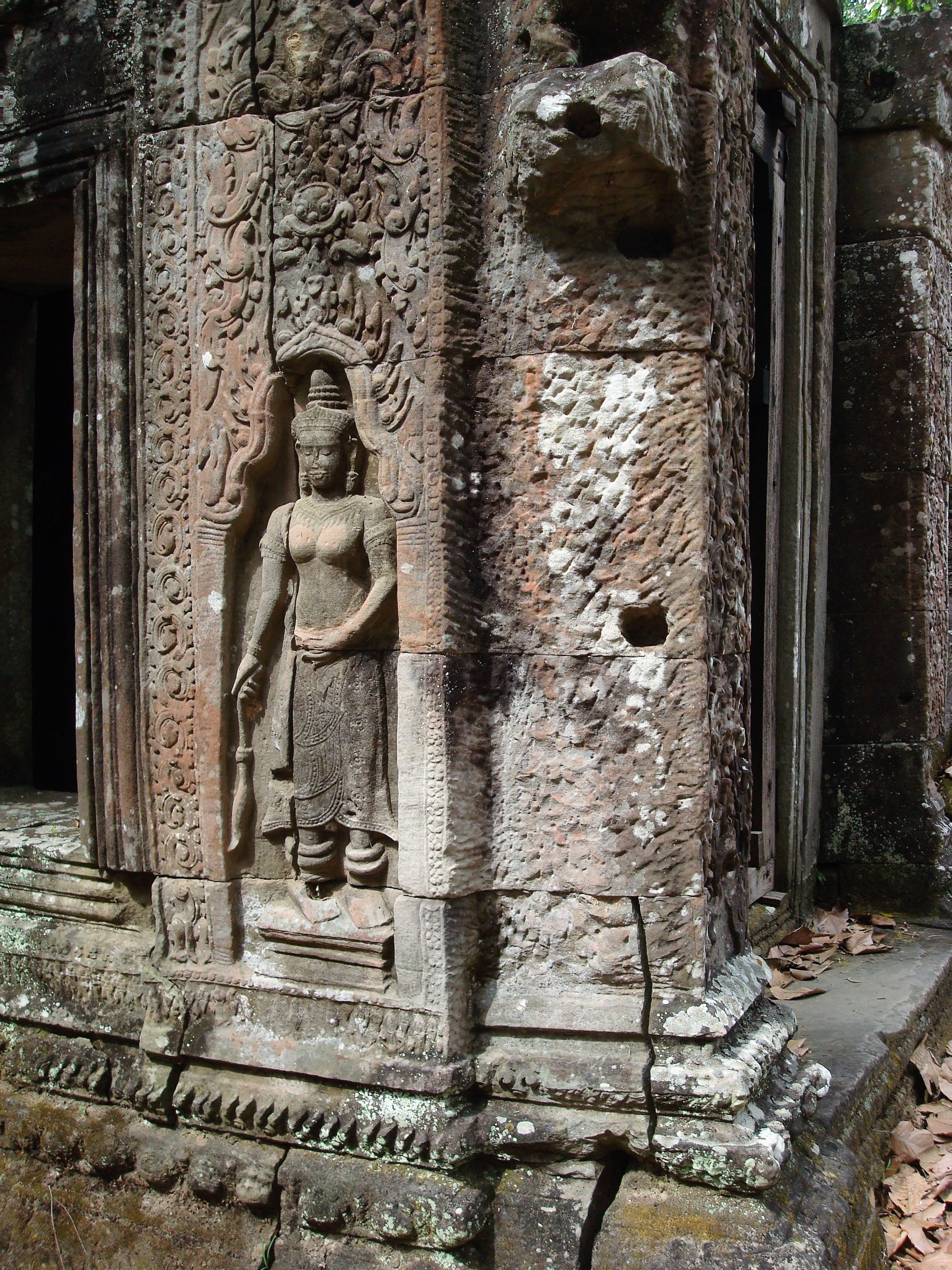

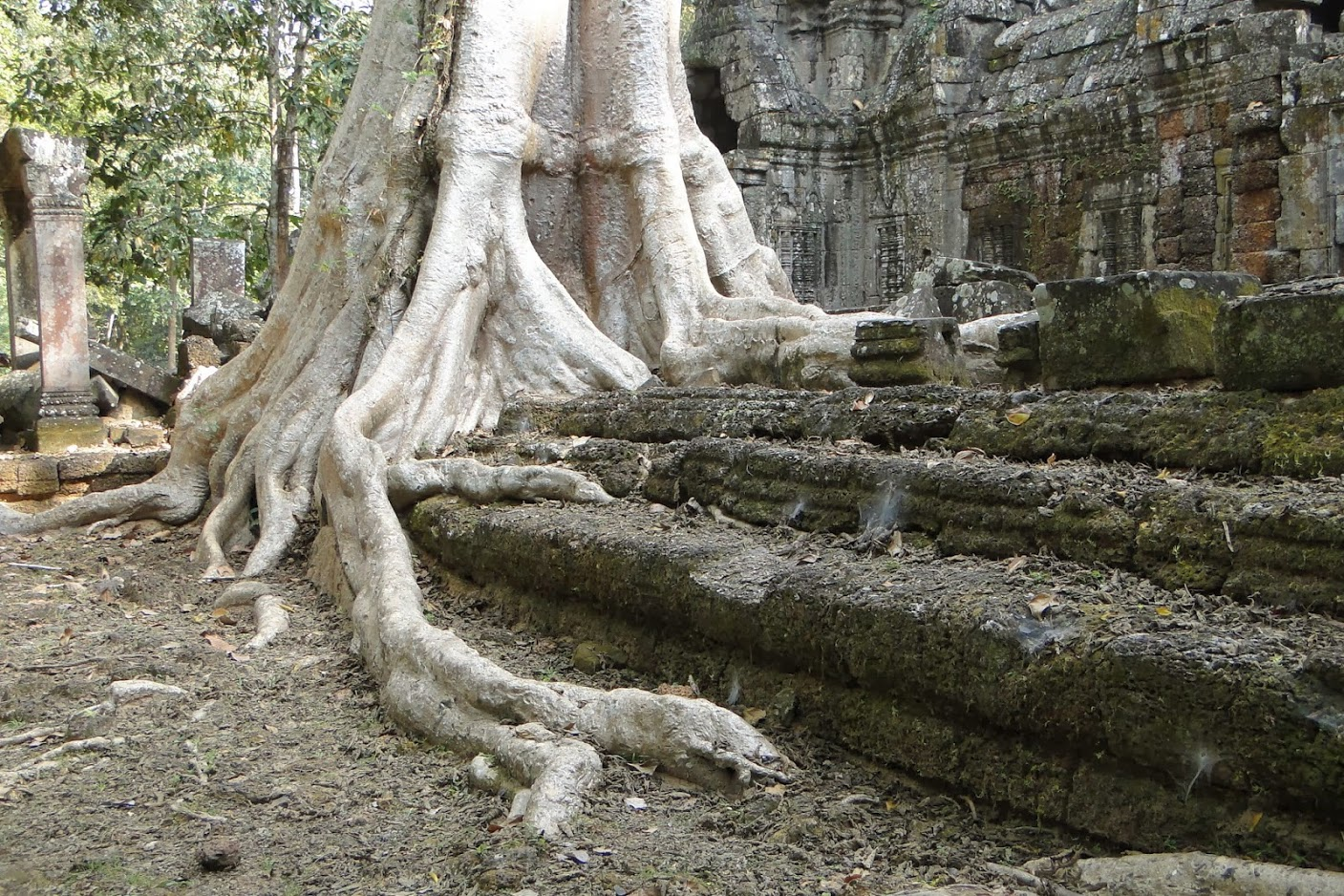

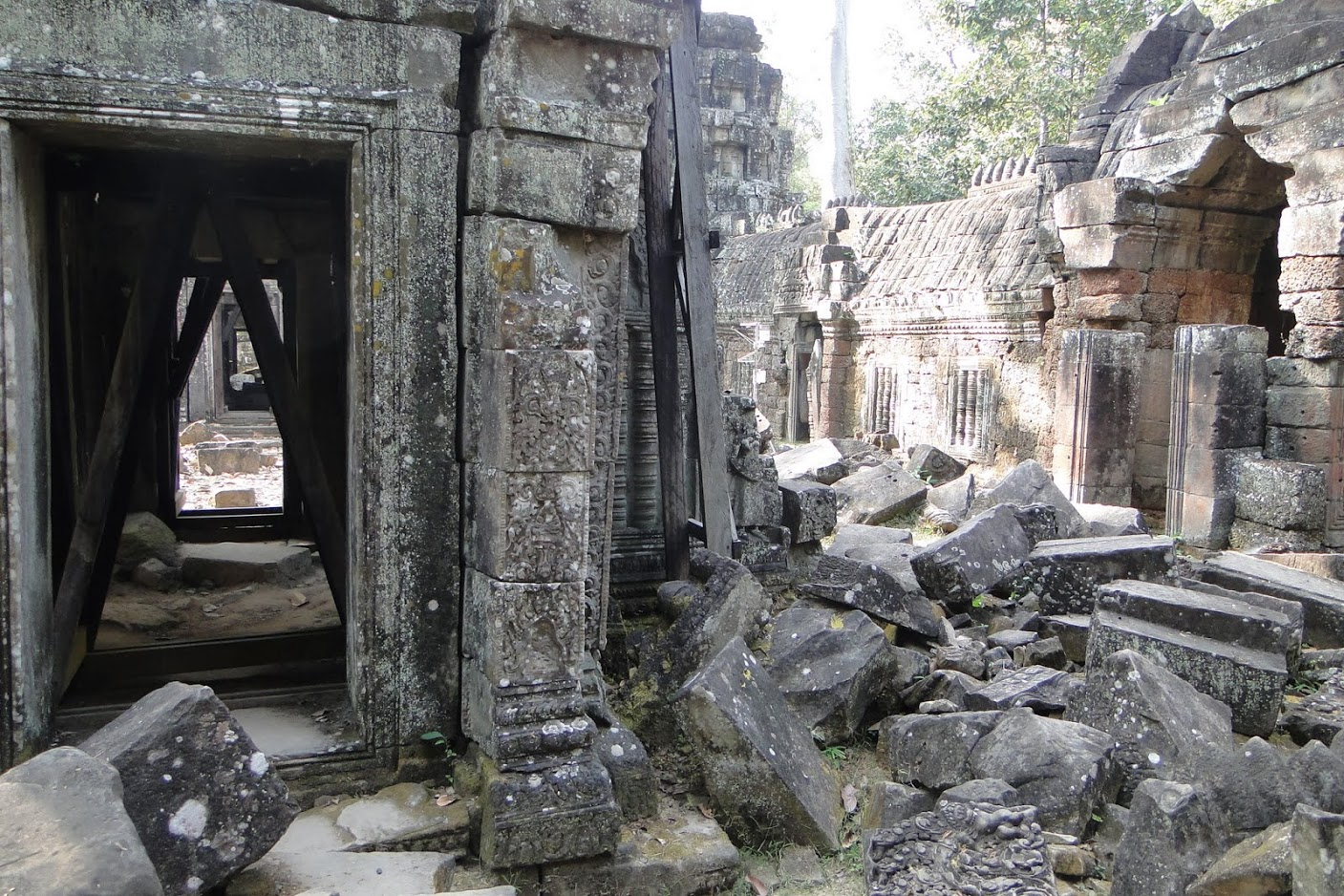

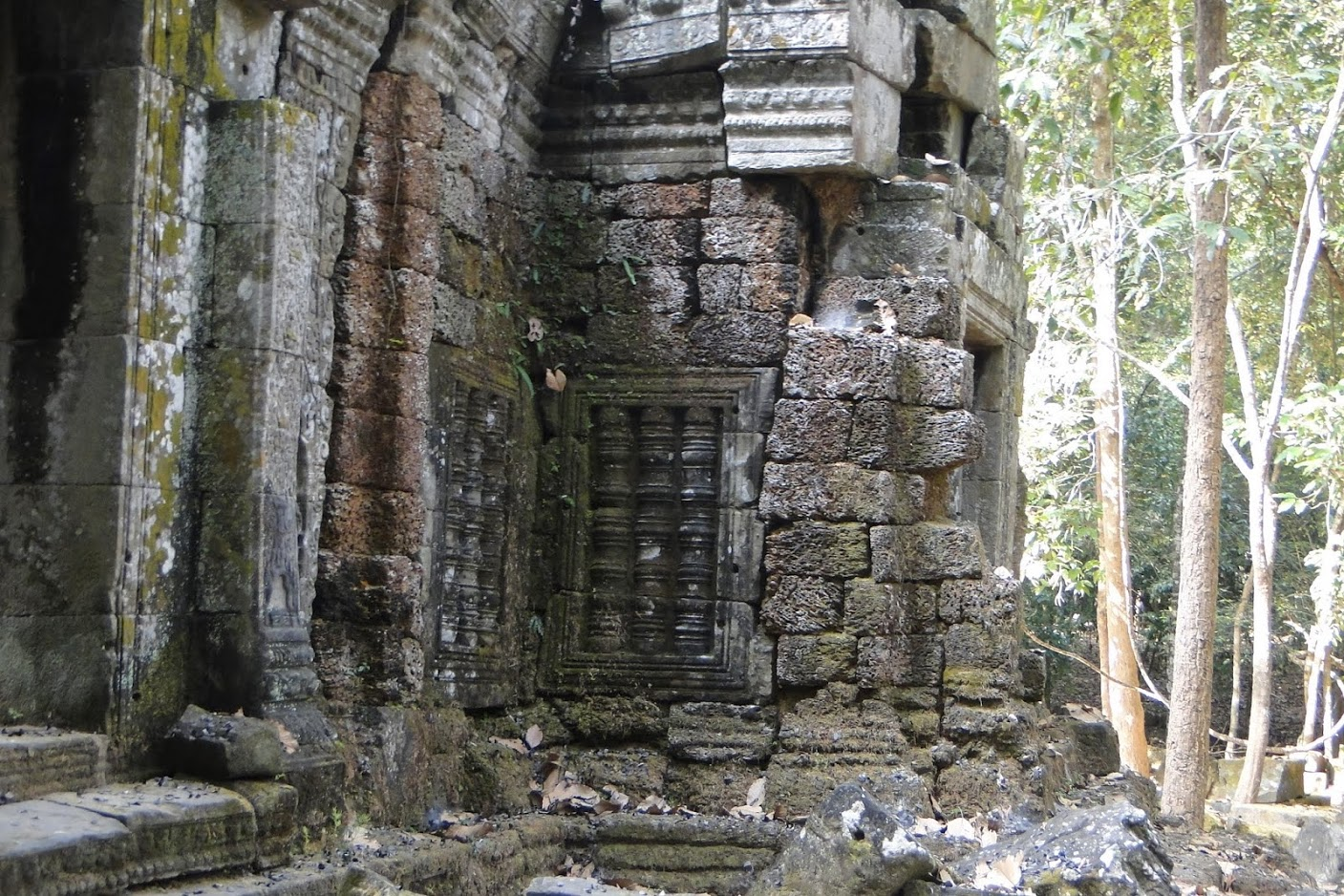

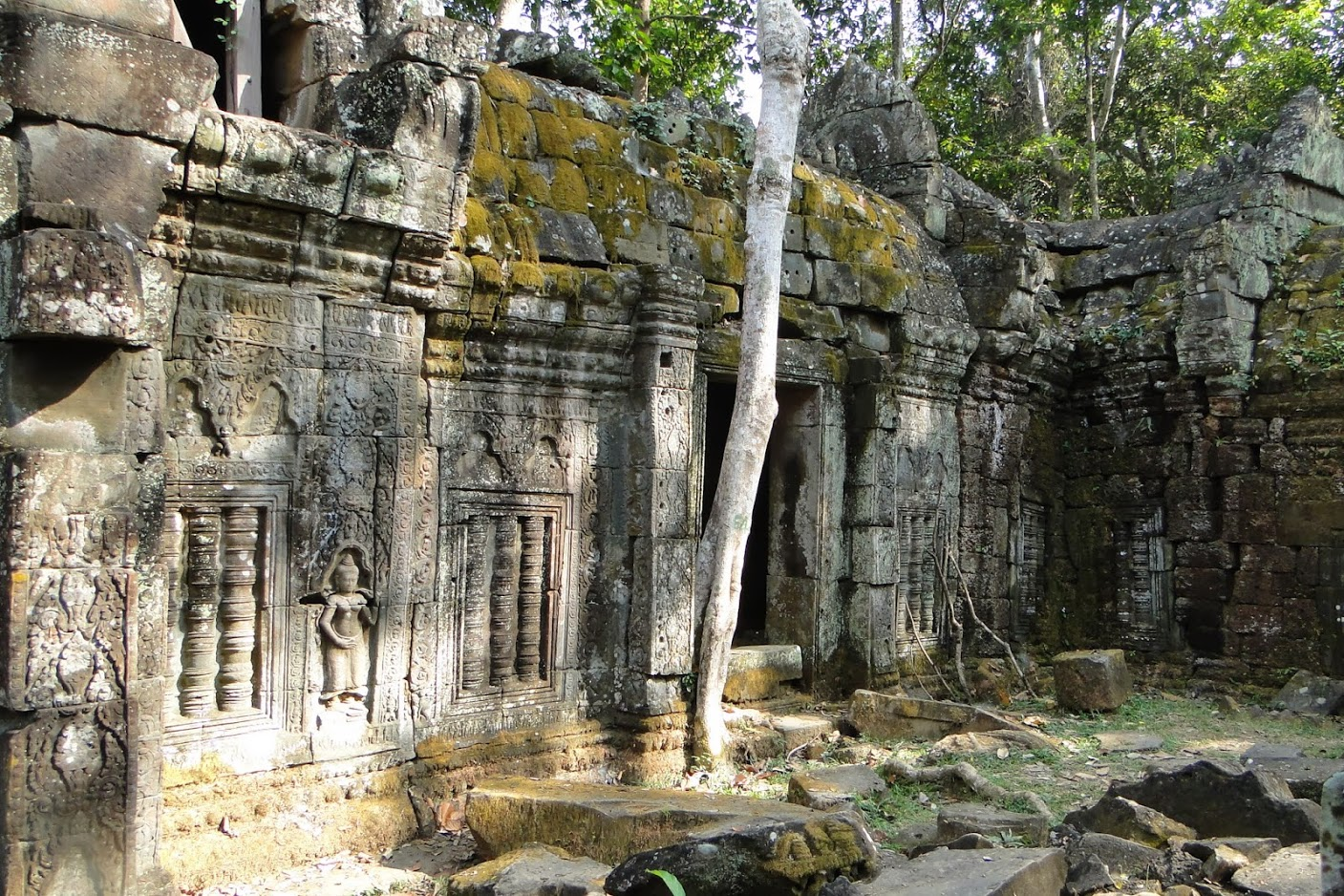

== See also ==
- Banteay Kdei
- Bayon
- Ta Prohm
- Ta Prohm Kel
- Ta Som

== Notes ==
- Jessup, Helen Ibbitson; Brukoff, Barry (2011). Temples of Cambodia - The Heart of Angkor (Hardback). Bangkok: River Books. ISBN 978-616-7339-10-8.
