= Traditional Cambodian medicine =

Traditional medicine of Cambodia

Traditional Cambodian medicine (Khmer: វេជ្ជសាស្រ្តបូរាណខ្មែរ, ALA-LC: Vejjasāstr Pūrāṇ Khmaer) comprise several traditional medicine systems in Cambodia.

Healers and herbalists of Cambodian traditional medicine are collectively referred to as Kru Khmer (Khmer: គ្រូខ្មែរ). There are many regional variations of the practice and herbal knowledge of traditional medicine within Cambodia. Traditional Cambodian medical practices are widely used in Cambodia.

Even though health is among the Cambodian government's five most important issues, the healthcare system in the country is inadequate and people in more remote villages in the provinces have difficulty obtaining health care. This situation is reflected in many developing countries and, in part for this reason, the World Health Organization (WHO) is promoting the use and preservation of knowledge of several traditional medicines in many of these areas across the globe, including Cambodia.

Because of the ethnic Chinese and ethnic Vietnamese populations of Cambodia, traditional Chinese medicine and traditional Vietnamese medicine are also practiced and represented in the country.

== Techniques and culture ==
Practitioners of traditional Cambodian medicine are called Kru Khmer (or alternately kru khmae) (គ្រូខ្មែរ) meaning "Khmer teachers", and the teacher-student aspect between practitioner and patient is of central importance to the consultation. Kru Khmer specialise in several categories, such as bone setting, herbalism or divining. Various animal parts, minerals and tattoos are sometimes involved. In the framework of traditional Cambodian medicine, the supernatural world can both cure and cause illness and therefore the definitions between what is medicinal and what is spiritual is often blurred.

Khmer traditional medicine share with Chinese traditional medicine three explanatory models of disease: supernaturalistic theory, naturalistic theory, and maintenance of a hot-cold (yin-yang) balance. Four forms of therapy are delivered by medical and para-medical personnel: spirit offerings, dermabrasion, maintaining hot-cold balance, and herbal medicines.

The knowledge of Khmer traditional medicine is mediated from teacher to teacher. Each Kru Khmer answers to his individual teacher, called Kru Khom, through a spiritual connection, even after the death of his Kru Khom. There are intricate rules and rituals involved in this relationship.

Khmer traditional medicine used to rely on written texts, Khmer sastras or palm-leaf manuscripts, since the 9th century, stored and studied at the many temples across the former Khmer Empire. However, during the Cambodian Civil War and the following Khmer Rouge regime, virtually all historic scholarly texts and philosophical literature in Cambodia were destroyed, including many Khmer medical manuscripts.

To understand the profession and practice of the Kru Khmer in more detail, the profession may be divided into a number of sub-classifications, each tied to a specific method, affliction of attention and/or service provided.

- Kru thnam (or kru phsam thnam) (គ្រូថ្នាំ or គ្រូផ្សំថ្នាំ) means "medicine combiner" and comprise traditional herbalists.
- Kru bakbek (or kru ta chh'oeng) (គ្រូបាក់បែក or គ្រូតឆ្អឹង) means "broken" (or "bone connector"). These are bone-setters using various herbal concoctions in bandages.
- Kru teay (គ្រូទាយ) are diviners and fortune-tellers. Methods range from astrological charts and mantras to herbs and blowing (sdaoh phlum).
- Kru sneh (គ្រូស្នេហ៍) means "charmer" and these kru khmers makes "love medicine" or charms to be used for general luck.
- Kru santhet (គ្រូសណ្ឋិត) are diviners with permanent access to some special spirits. They are supposed to divine the course of certain diseases and sometimes use herbs too.
- Kru thmob (គ្រូធ្មប់) are sorcerers said to cause illness or inflict evil upon people. Broadly despised and feared in traditional Cambodian culture and viewed as evil themselves, no kru khmer would admit to be or practise thmup. To cure evil inflicted by thmob one would need the help from a kru teay, kru santhet, kru chol rub or a Buddhist monk.
- Kru chol rub (or kru baromei) (គ្រូចូលរូប or គ្រូបារមី) meaning "body enterer", are possessed spirit mediums, often female. They are able to perform diagnosis or exorcisms.
- Buddhist monks plays a role in the practice of traditional Cambodian medicine, as they perform exorcisms, mostly preventive exorcisms.
- Chhmab boran (ឆ្មបបូរាណ) are midwives who, under the guidance of a personal spirit, performs nursing and ritual assistance for mother and child during and after delivery.

Individual Kru Khmer healers may perform several roles altogether.

== History ==
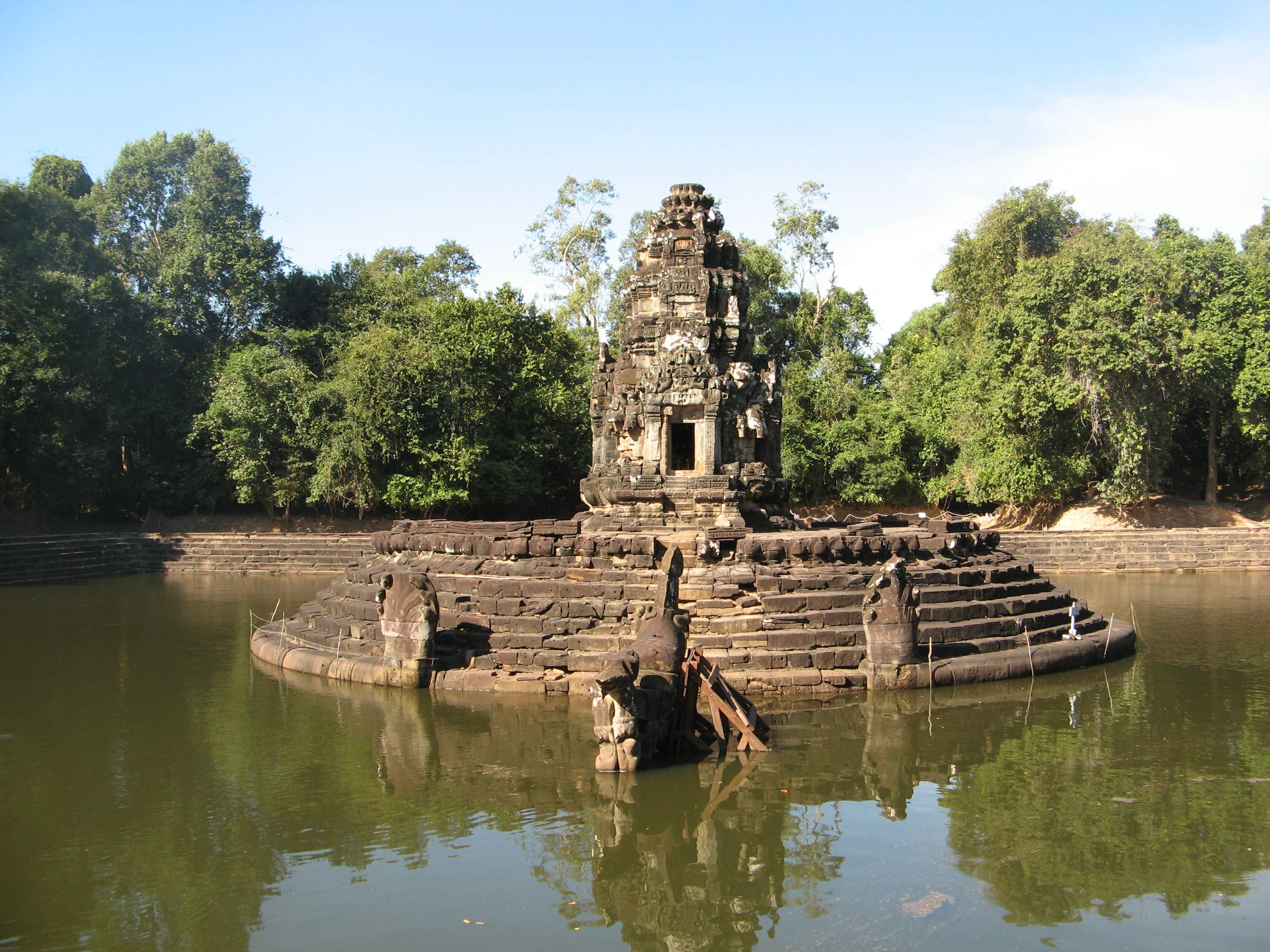
Neak Poan is believed to be the central temple for traditional Khmer medicine during the Angkorian period. The image shows the central sanctuary of Neak Poan.

The exact origins of traditional Khmer medicine (TKM) remains unclear, but it is believed to have been founded and formalised from the Nokor Phnom period (Funan era) to the 9th century, during the Angkorian period. It is influenced by Ayurveda (traditional Indian medicine) and traditional Chinese medicine. These foreign frameworks and practices were mixed with local beliefs and superstitions to create the foundations of TKM. The temple of Neak Poan is believed to have been the central temple for Khmer medicine during the Angkorian era. Jayavarman VII, who reigned c.1181–1218, ordered the construction of 102 hospitals ('halls devoid of disease' or arogyasala) throughout his realm.

Khmer inscriptions investigated by French archeological researcher George Cœdès in the early 20th century, confirmed the existence of 15 hospitals (out of Jayavarman VII's 102 hospitals) across the kingdom. Those 15 hospitals are:

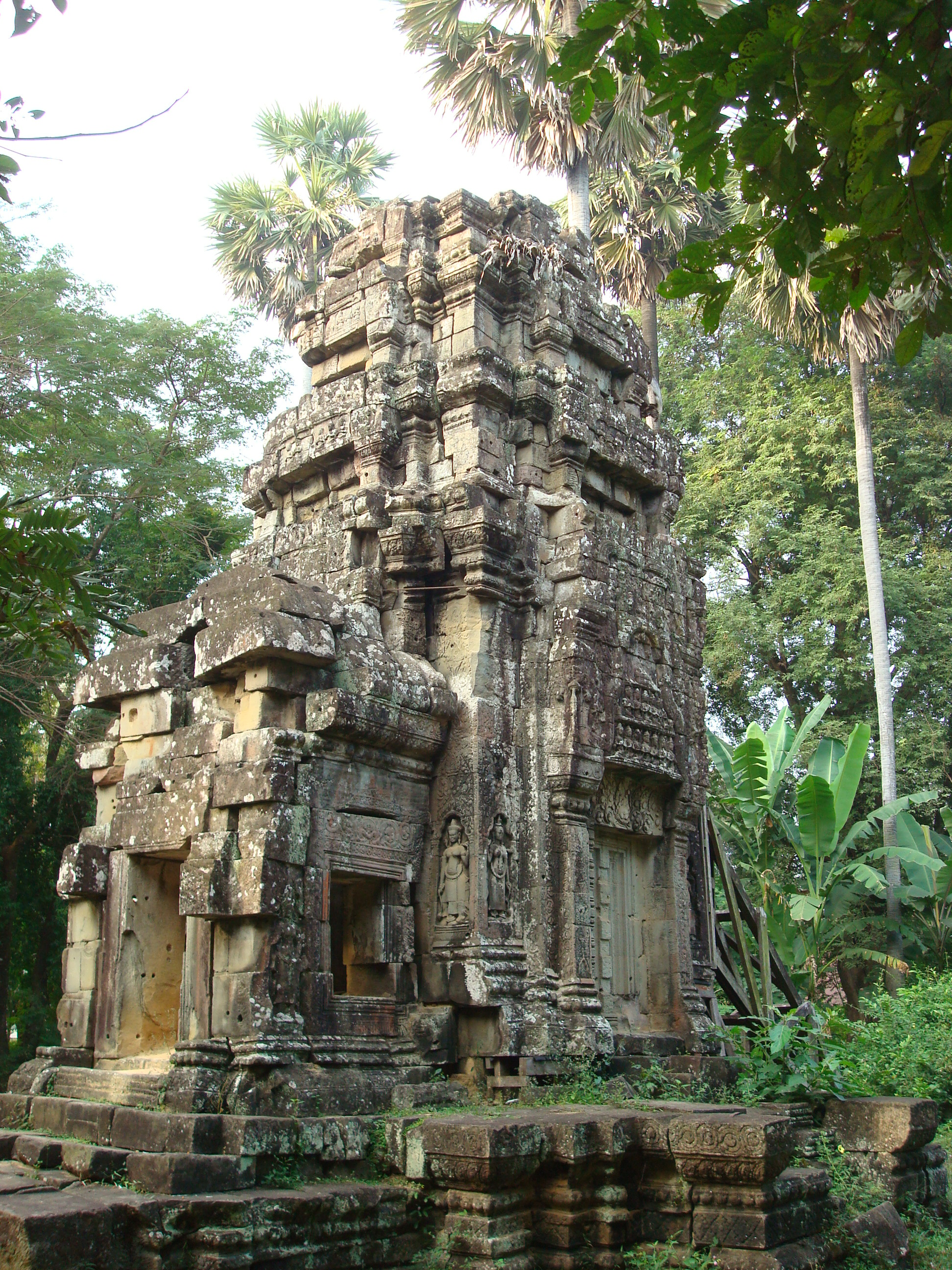
Ta Prohm Kel temple is one of the 102 hospitals of king Jayavarman VII, located in Angkor historical park.

No.	Names in English	Names in Khmer	Sources (inscription codes, pages)
1	Choan Chum	ជាន់ជំុ	K-11 Inv.I p. 3
2	Kh'na temple	ប្រាសាទខ្នា	K-160 p. 240
3	Kok Roka	គោករកា	K-435 BEFEO, XIII p. 34, XV p. 108
4	Banteay Thleng temple	ប្រាសាទបន្ទាយថ្លែង	K-667 BEEFEO, XXX, p. 222, 224
5	Sai Fong	សាយហ្វុង	K-368 Inv.II p. 96
6	Ta Moan Toch temple	ប្រាសាទតាមាន់តូច	K-375 Inv.II p. 132
7	Wat Pak'am	វត្តផ្គាំ	K.386 Inv.II p. 223
8	Konburi	គន់បូរី	K.387 Inv.II p. 238
9	Nom Van	នំវ័ន	K-395 Inv.II p. 265
10	Wat Ku	វត្តគុ	K-402 Inv, II p. 310
11	West gopura of Angkor Thom	គោបុរៈខាងលិចអង្គរធំ	K-602 BEFEO, XXVI, p. 512
12	Ta Prohm Kel temple	ប្រាសាទតាព្រហ្មកិល	K-614 Inv.III, p. 116
13	Ta Keo, the hospital temple	ប្រាសាទតាកែវ	K-537 BCA1, 1917–30
14	Ta Ke Pong temple	ប្រាសាទតាកេពង់	K-209 Inv, III p. 438
15	Wat Svay	វត្តស្វាយ	K-912, EFEO No 22, p. 8

Inscriptions in these hospitals describe the number of medical staff and their different roles such as hospital managers, drug combiner staff, water boiler staff, drug grinders and drug distributors. An inscription in Sai Fong has become the most renowned quote of King Jayavarman VII: "Diseases of the people make him more painful than his own illness."

Prasat Chrey (Khmer: ប្រាសាទជ្រៃ) and Prasat Lek 8 (Number 8 temple) (Khmer: ប្រាសាទលេខ៨) are temples in Sambor Prei Kuk that were previous hospital chapels during the Chenla era. Inside the hospital chapels, ground or smashed traditional herbal medicines extracted from plant trunks, roots and leaves were mixed with purified water. The drug liquid was then poured over a Shiva Linga to enhance the effectiveness, after which it flowed from the Linga base through the outside part of the chapels via a drainpipe connected to the north side of the buildings. Here, patients, who were waiting outside the hospital, finally received the drug liquid.

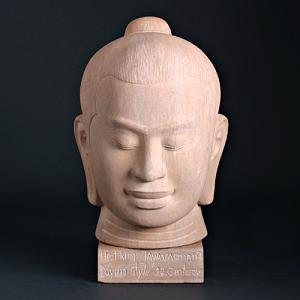
Jayavarman VII ordered a total of 102 'halls of diseaselessness' across the Angkorian Empire in the 12th century, serving the general population.

The knowledge and practice of TKM was written down on palm-leaf manuscripts, written in the pali language, and stored in temples all over the empire. Most of these original Khmer medicinal manuscripts are thought to have been destroyed in the Cambodian Civil War, but some still exists and they represent some of the most reliable sources to the origins of TKM.

Surviving ancient Khmer medical texts shows a considerable systematization of medical knowledge, but an institutionalized Khmer medical system with associated doctrine-based practices, did not survive into the modern age in Cambodia. Scholars and historians have long wondered what happened to this grand medical tradition and the 13th century is considered a crucial tipping point in the history of traditional Khmer medicine. The gradual decline of the Angkorian Empire and the religious shifts to Theravada Buddhism appears to have affected the original medical culture greatly. The Siamese conquest of Angkor is not thought to have destroyed the medical traditions, but rather appropriated the medical knowledge and preserved it as Thai instead of Khmer. The French colonial era is also thought to have affected and prevented the rise of the ancient Khmer medical tradition. Unlike India for example, where dialogue and knowledge exchange between initial colonialists and Indian doctors took place, the colonial presence beginning with the 18th century in Cambodia was almost instantaneous and the French demanded and relied upon Western medicine from the very start, abolishing the local Cambodian medical traditions altogether. The following independence and warring upheaval of Cambodia during the civil war, the Khmer Rouge regime and the Vietnamese occupation, all continued this suppression of medical traditions, in particular the spiritual aspects. This centuries-long pressure fragmented the Khmer medical tradition, sometimes with local reinventions emerging.

Historically, three sub-categorizations of the Kru Khmer profession have been noted: kru pet (Khmer:គ្រូពេទ្យ), kru thnam and tmup. Kru pet were the most revered and theoretically educated. They studied the palm-leaf manuscripts in temples and were mostly found around the royalty's residences and temples, less so among the general population. Kru thnam, who were herbalists without much interest in religious aspects, were much more numerous and to be found throughout the country. Tmup were sorcerers. These general categorizations are still in use in Cambodia today, but the kru pet class is nonexistent.

=== Notable Kru Khmers ===
Kru pet hermits have always been glorified and venerated in the Khmer culture for their kindness of saving human and animal lives. Statues were made to pay respect to kru pet, like the hermit sculpture on Phnom Santuk mountain, and hermitages or temples dedicated to kru pet were built such as Maha Rusey (Khmer: មហាឫសី) hermitage on Phnom Da mountain.

Semahatata (Khmer: សឹម្ហទត្ត) was a royal doctor of King Rodravarman and Jayavarman I during Chenla period. In addition, he was the royal official of King Bhavavarman I and Mahendravarman. At that time, he was the mayor of Vyadhapura also.

Yajnavaraha was a religious Kru Khmer and royal physician of the Khmer Empire in the 10th century. Along with Khmer traditional medicine he also practiced Ayurveda, an Indian traditional medicine system.

== Centers and organizations ==
A Traditional Medicine Research Center was opened in Cambodia in 1982. In 1983, production of selected medicines began at the research center and a number of books on healing plants have been published. Specialists in Cambodian traditional medicine have been brought to the Faculty of Medicine for conferences and one of the faculty's goals is to introduce traditional medicine in all curricula at primary, secondary, and university levels.

In 2009, the National School of Traditional Medicine opened in Phnom Penh. The school teaches and collects knowledge of traditional medicine in Cambodia, usually referred to as Khmer traditional medicine. The school has a special educational focus on hygiene and anatomy.

== Laws and regulations ==
Regulation of herbal medicines in Cambodia was introduced in 1998. Herbal medicines are regulated as over the counter medicines and for self medication only. By law, no claims may be made about herbal medicines.

The regulatory requirements for manufacturing or safety assessment, and the control mechanisms established to ensure compliance, come under the Department of Drugs and Food. As of 2005, there are 48 registered herbal medicines in Cambodia; however, none of them are included on a national essential drug list.

Herbal medicines in Cambodia are sold in pharmacies as over the counter medicines, in special outlets, by licensed practitioners and without restriction.

== See also ==
- Khmer sastras
- Health in Cambodia
- Pharmacognosy

== Sources ==
- Maurice Eisenbruch (1992). "The Ritual Space of Patients and Traditional Healers in Cambodia". Bulletin de l'École française d'Extrême-Orient. 79 (2): 283–316. doi:10.3406/befeo.1992.1882.
- Ashwell, D. and Walston, N. (2008). "An overview of the use and trade of plants and animals in traditional medicine systems in Cambodia" (PDF). TRAFFIC Southeast Asia.
- J. Ovesen and I. Trankell (2010). Cambodians and Their Doctors (PDF). NIAS Press.
- Kent Maynard (2007): Medical Identities, Berghahn Books
- Journal of Complementary and Integrative Medicine (July 2010): Traditional Cambodian Medicine
- The Nippon Foundation: Turning a Country of Land Mines into a Country of Medicine: A New Role for Traditional Herbalists in Cambodia
- Nomad Recherche et Soutien International (2011): Traditional therapeutic knowledge of the Bunong People in North-eastern Cambodia: Healers, their practices and medicinal plants
