= Kantueu Muoy =

Commune in Banan District, Battambang Province, Cambodia

Coordinates: 12°55′N 103°08′E

Kantueu Muoy ឃុំកន្ទឺ ១
- Commune
- Interactive map of Kantueu Muoy
- Country: Cambodia
- Province: Battambang Province
- District: Banan District
- Villages: 7
- Time zone: UTC+07

Kantueu 1 (Khmer: ឃុំកន្ទឺ ១) is a khum (commune) of Banan District in Battambang Province in north-western Cambodia.

== Villages ==
Kantueu Muoy contains seven villages.

Name	Khmer	Village code
Thmei	ថ្មី	02010101
Tuol Thnong	ទួលធ្នង់	02010102
Svay Prey	ស្វាយព្រៃ	02010103
Svay Bei Daeum	ស្វាយបីដើម	02010104
Kampong Ampil	កំពង់អំពិល	02010105
Sasar Pok	សសរពក	02010106
Voat Kantueu	វត្តកន្ទឺ	02010107
