= Kantueu Pir =

Commune in Banan District, Battambang Province, Cambodia

Coordinates: 12°56′N 103°08′E

Kantueu Pir កន្ទឺ២
- Commune
- Interactive map of Kantueu Pir
- Country: Cambodia
- Province: Battambang
- District: Banan
- Time zone: UTC+7 (ICT)

Kantueu Pir (Khmer: កន្ទឺ២) is a commune (khum) of Banan District in Battambang Province in north-western Cambodia.

== Villages ==
Kantueu Pir has seven villages.

Name	Khmer	Village code
Post Kantueu	ប៉ុស្តិកន្ទឺ	02010201
Chamkar Ou	ចំការអូរ	02010202
Banan	បាណន់	02010203
Kampang Lech	កំប៉ង់លិច	02010204
Kampang Kaeut	កំប៉ង់កើត	02010205
Chhay Rumpoat	ឆាយរំពាត់	02010206
Phnom Kul	ភ្នំគល់	02010207
