= Phnum Sampov =

Coordinates: 13°02′N 103°06′E

Phnum Sampov ឃុំ ភ្នំសំពៅ
- Commune
- Interactive map of Phnum Sampov
- Country: Cambodia
- Province: Battambang Province
- District: Banan District
- Villages: 10
- Time zone: UTC+07

Phnum Sampov (Khmer: ឃុំ ភ្នំសំពៅ) is a khum (commune) of Banan District in Battambang Province in north-western Cambodia.

== Villages ==
Phnum Sampov contains ten villages.

Name	Khmer	Village code
Chaeng Kdar	ចែងក្តារ	2010601
Kampouv	កំប៉ូវ	2010602
Kouk Ampil	គោកអំពិល	2010603
Phnom Sampov Lech	ភ្នំសំពៅលិច	081757569
Phnom Sampov Kaeut	ភ្នំសំពៅកើត	2010605
Samnanh	សំណាញ់	2010606
Kdaong	ក្តោង	2010607
Krapeu Cheung	ក្រពើជើង	2010608
Krapeu Tboung	ក្រពើត្បូង	2010609
Krapeu Kaeut	ក្រពើកើត	2010610
