= Chaeng Mean Chey =

Chaeng Mean Chey ឃុំចែងមានជ័យ
- Commune
- Location within Cambodia
- Coordinates: 12°51′25″N 103°05′37″E
- Country: Cambodia
- Province: Battambang Province
- District: Banan District
- Villages: 7
- Time zone: UTC+07
- Geocode: 020105

Chaeng Mean Chey (Khmer: ឃុំចែងមានជ័យ) is a khum (commune) of Banan District in Battambang Province in north-western Cambodia.

== Villages ==
Chaeng Mean Chey contains seven villages.

Name	Khmer	Village code
Rung	រូង	2010501
Chaeng	ចែង	2010502
Kampong Kol	កំពង់គល់	2010503
Thngaor	ធ្ងរ័	2010504
Boh Khnor	បុះខ្នុរ	2010505
Changhour Svay	ចង្ហូរស្វាយ	2010506
Doung	ដូង	2010507
