= Bay Damram =

Bay Damram ឃុំបាយដំរាំ
- Commune
- Location within Cambodia
- Coordinates: 12°59′0″N 103°10′0″E
- Country: Cambodia
- Province: Battambang Province
- District: Banan District
- Villages: 8
- Time zone: UTC+07

Bay Damram (Khmer: ឃុំបាយដំរាំ) is a khum (commune) of Banan District in Battambang Province in north-western Cambodia.

== Villages ==
The commune contains 8 villages.

Name	Khmer	Village code
Tuol Chranieng	ទួលច្រនៀង	02010301
Kampong Chaeng	កំពង់ចែង	02010302
Kanhchroang	កញ្ច្រោង	02010303
Krala Peas	ក្រឡាពាស	02010304
Bay Damram	បាយដំរាំ	02010305
Ta Song	តាស៊ង	02010306
Sdau	ស្តៅ	02010307
Prey Totueng	ព្រៃទទឹង	02010308
