= Sāstrā sleuk rith =

Khmer palm-leaf manuscript

Sāstrā sleuk rith (Khmer: សាស្ត្រាស្លឹករឹត) or Khmer manuscripts written on palm leaves are sastra which constitute a major part of the literature of Cambodia along with the Khmer inscriptions kept since the foundation of the Khmer Empire in Southeast Asia.

== Production ==
Khmer sastras are written in the Pali language, and some in Khmer, on a variety of materials.

The sastras are made of dried palm leaves from the Corypha lecomtei palm tree or more often from the traeng tree, also known as talipot palm and by its scientific name of corypha umbraculifera. Once cut off from the tree, the leaves are ordered, cleaned, heated, straightened, and tied together in what is known as an olla book or palm-leaf manuscript.

The inscription process is also done according to traditional techniques. Few are original compositions and most are exact copies and in form, shape and size of older manuscripts. The text is carved into the palm-leaf. It can only be seend visibly and read once it has been treated with a light resin extracted from a type of resin tree called chher teal or Dipterocarpus alatus is used to fill in the carving and a soot is applied to make the letters appear. Only then must the manuscripts be cleaned using fine sand or bran to wipe the excess of ink.

== History ==
=== The archeological evidence of lost Angkorian manuscripts ===
Not one single Khmer manuscript has survived from the Khmer Empire. However, other archeological findings confirm that they were well in use since ancient times. The tradition of producing olla books in Cambodia goes back as far as the influence of Indian civilization in the region and the tradition of Khmer sastras is at least contemporaneous with the introduction of Buddhism and other religions of Indian origin in the Khmer realm. Their presence in Cambodia is attested with certainty in a 12th-century bas-relief in the Angkor Wat temple, depicting an apsara (female spirit) holding an olla book. The Chinese visitor Zhou Daguan, who toured the Khmer capital in 1292, also relates in his travelogue that monks would recite daily prayers read from books made of "very evenly stacked palm leaves".

=== The Khmer manuscripts of the Oudong era ===
In the 13th century, the Khmer Empire gradually declined, large parts of the kingdom were conquered by neighboring cultures, such as the Siamese and Chams, founding what became the Ayutthaya Kingdom (predecessor of modern-day Thailand) and Southern Vietnam respectively. At the same time the official state religion of the Khmers changed from Hinduism and Mahayana Buddhism to Theravada Buddhism. Combined, the result was that much of the former legacy of the Khmer sastras became absorbed by the Thai culture or was forgotten.

In the 16th century, a substantial body of Buddhist literature was created in the Cambodian temples. In later times, up to the present, pagodas served as library storehouses of Khmer sastras and literary works.

=== The culturcide of manuscripts under the Khmers Rouges ===
In the course of the Cambodian Civil War and the subsequent upheavals of the Khmer Rouge regime in the 1960s and 1970s, an estimated 80% of Cambodian pagodas had their libraries destroyed and a large number of monks perished as well. More than half of the Khmer literary legacy from before 1975 was lost in these years. The surviving Khmer sastras are now kept in Cambodian pagodas, the National Library of Cambodia and a multitude of institutes across the world, including Bibliothèque Nationale de France. Only a few monks in present-day Cambodia have expert knowledge of how to craft sastras.

=== Safeguarding the legacy of Khmer manuscripts since the 1990s ===
Since the 1980s, several groups, organizations and institutes in Cambodia and abroad are working for the preservation of the Khmer sastras for the future. Many of the ancient manuscripts have now been digitized. The effort is almost exclusively directed at preserving former Khmer sastras, very few people are crafting new ones.

== Classification ==
Khmer literature is generally divided into three main categories, namely Tes, containing sacred Buddhist knowledge, Sāstrā lbaeng with literary verses of a rich vocabulary for general entertainment, and the technical Kbuon containing knowledge of medicine, pharmacopoeia, astronomy, law, chronicles, magics, divination or demonology.

Apart from sastra olla books, the ancient Khmers also made paper books (from mulberry bark) known as kraing and wrote on stone, metals, and human skin (tattoos) but rarely used animal hide or skins.

Every Khmer manuscript identified by the French School of the Extreme Orient a more detailed classification in 6 categories.

== Conservation ==
=== Libraries ===
During the Angkorian era, Khmer sastras were made by monks in the Khmer temples and stored in monastery libraries. Constructed from wood, these libraries were sometimes fitted with a multi-tiered roof, sitting in the middle of small ponds, to protect them from termites. The knowledge about these ancient libraries has only been inferred from the area of present-day Thailand, then part of the Khmer Empire. In Thailand, they are known as ho trai today.

Palm-leaves gets attacked by mold, insects, moisture and weather, especially in a tropical climate, and in order to preserve Khmer sastras, a strategy of minute copying has been the usual recipe for the Buddhist monks. Because of this practice, most of the present day Khmer sastras were probably produced in the 19th century, as copies of former times sastras.

=== Fund for Manuscript Publication in Cambodia ===
The Fund for Manuscript Publication in Cambodia is a library located within the compound of Phnom Penh's Wat Ounalom, where these forms of palm-leaf manuscripts from all over the country are preserved. This research centre was founded by French archeologist Olivier de Bernon of the French School of the Far Eastin 1990 with the mission to locate, restore, identify and make an inventory of the extant manuscripts. In 2012, the library came under the administration of the Ministry of Culture and Fine Arts.

=== Political patronage ===
According to Vann Bunna of the Cults and Religions Ministry of Cambodia, the Khmer government is urging all pagodas and schools to keep them for future generations. In March 2017, Prime Minister Hun Sen pledged to buy as many sastra sleuk rith manuscripts as a Siem Reap craftswoman can produce.

== See also ==
- Buddhism in Cambodia
- History of Buddhism in Cambodia
- Cambodian literature
- Folding-book manuscript

== Sources ==
- "Ancient Manuscripts Digitization and Indexation". AMADI Project. Public database of digitized manuscripts.
- Prof. K. R. Chhem and M. R. Antelme (2004). "A Khmer Medical Text "The Treatment of the Four Diseases" Manuscript". Siksācakr, Journal of Cambodia Research. 6: 33–42.
- C. D. Godakumbura (1983). Catalogue of Cambodian and Burmese Pāli Manuscripts. The Royal Library (Copenhagen).
- Ebihara, Mortland and Ledgerwood (1994). Cambodian Culture Since 1975: Homeland and Exile. Cornell University Press. ISBN 0801481732.
