= Ta Kream =

Ta Kream ឃុំ តាគ្រាម
- Commune
- Location within Cambodia
- Coordinates: 13.067°N 103.067°E
- Country: Cambodia
- Province: Battambang Province
- District: Banan District
- Villages: 11
- Time zone: UTC+07

Ta Kream (Khmer: ឃុំ តាគ្រាម) is a khum (commune) of Banan District in Battambang Province in north-western Cambodia.

== Villages ==
Ta Kream contains 11 villages.

Name	Khmer	Village code
Paoy Svay	ប៉ោយស្វាយ	2010801
Ta Kream	តាគ្រាម	2010802
Thmei	ថ្មី	2010803
Ou Pong Moan	អូរពងមាន់	2010804
Ta Ngaen	តាង៉ែន	2010805
Prey Phdau	ព្រៃផ្តៅ	2010806
Ou Ta Nhea	អូរតាញា	2010807
Dangkot Thnong	ដង្គត់ធ្នង់	2010808
Andoung Neang	អណ្តូងនាង	2010809
Anlong Svay	អន្លង់ស្វាយ	2010810
Slab Pang	ស្លាបប៉ាង	2010811

== Kamping Pouy Reservoir ==
Within the area of Ta Kream commune lies the 6-kilometer-long and 1.9-kilometer-wide Kamping Puoy Reservoir. This reservoir can hold about 110 million cubic meters of water, which is mainly used for irrigation.

It is located around 30 km west of the city of Battambang and accessible by a new road. It is popular with the inhabitants of Battambang and elsewhere who come out here in the weekend for a picnic. The journey to the reservoir is part of the attraction as it passes through some countryside. Once at the reservoir there are a number of food and drink stalls to rest at and it is possible to charter a boat to take you out on the lake and maybe visit some of the people who live in stilt houses.

The reservoir was originally built by the Khmer Rouge in one of their grander schemes. Thousands of people died during the construction of the dam.
