= Snoeng =

Snoeng ឃុំ ស្នឹង
- Commune
- Location within Cambodia
- Coordinates: 12.967°N 103.067°E
- Country: Cambodia
- Province: Battambang Province
- District: Banan District
- Villages: 11
- Time zone: UTC+07

Snoeng (Khmer: ឃុំ ស្នឹង) is a khum (commune) of Banan District in Battambang Province in north-western Cambodia. It is home to Snoeng Temples.

== Villages ==
Snoeng contains 11 villages.

Name	Khmer	Village code
Samraong	សំរោង	2010701
Kor	គរ	2010702
Snoeng Lech	ស្នឹងលិច	2010703
Snoeng Kaeut	ស្នឹងកើត	2010704
Boeng Chaeng	បឹងចែង	2010705
Boeng Prei	បឹងប្រី	2010706
Peak Sbaek	ពាក់ស្បែក	2010707
Preah Srae	ព្រះស្រែ	2010708
Rumchey	រំជៃ	2010709
Sambuor Meas	សំបួរមាស	2010710
Boeng Krasal	បឹងក្រសាល	2010711
