= Chheu Teal =

Commune in Banan District, Battambang Province, Cambodia

Chheu Teal ឃុំ ឈើទាល
- Commune
- Location within Cambodia
- Coordinates: 13°1′N 103°10′E
- Country: Cambodia
- Province: Battambang Province
- District: Banan District
- Villages: 15
- Time zone: UTC+07
- Geocode: 20104

Chheu Teal (Khmer: ឃុំ ឈើទាល) is a khum (commune) of Banan District in Battambang Province in north-western Cambodia.

== Villages ==
Chheu Teal contains fifteen villages.

Name	Khmer	Population (1998)	Village code
Kampong Chhlang	កំពង់ឆ្លង		2010401
Chheu Teal	ឈើទាល		2010402
Kampong Srama	កំពង់ស្រម៉		2010403
Khnar	ខ្នារ		2010404
Enteak Chit	ឥន្ទជិត		2010405
Bat Sala	បត់សាលា		2010406
Bay Damram	បាយដំរាំ		2010407
Svay Prakeab	ស្វាយប្រគាប		2010408
Chhak Pou	ឆកពោធិ៍		2010409
Anlong Ta Mei	អន្លង់តាម៉ី		2010410
Chamkar Svay	ចំការស្វាយ		2010411
Thkov	ថ្កូវ		2010412
Baboh	បបុះ		2010413
Doung	ដូង		2010414
Anlok Kaong	អន្លក់កោង		2010415
