= Anavatapta =

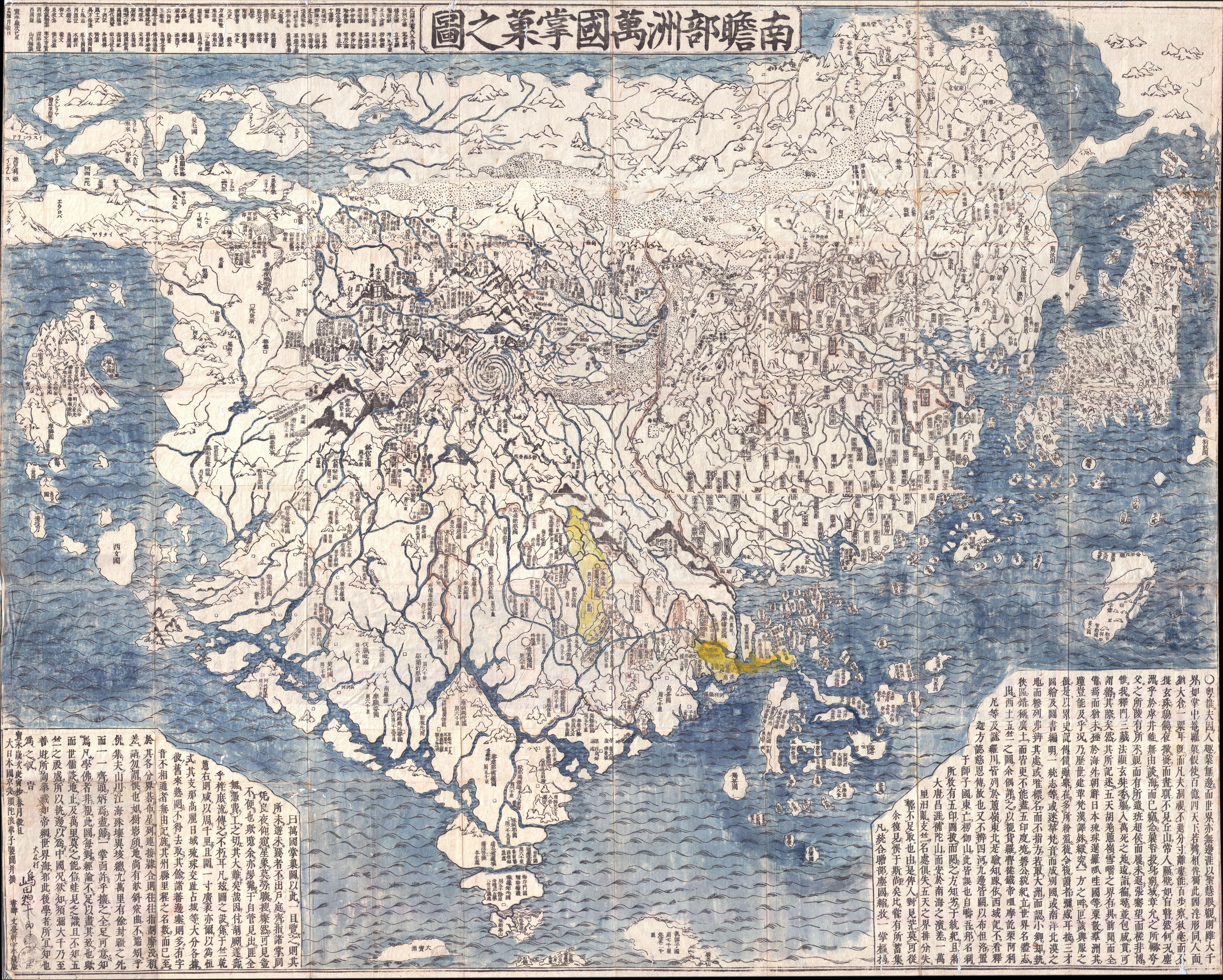
Anavatapta on a Japanese Buddhist world map (1710)

Anavatapta (Sanskrit अनवतप्त "the Unheated", Chinese: 阿那婆達多; pinyin: Ānàpó-dáduō; Japanese pronunciation: Anabadatta, also called Chinese: 無熱(悩)池; pinyin: Wúrènǎochí; Japanese pronunciation: Munetsu(nō)chi "the Pond without Heat") is the lake lying at the center of the world, according to ancient Indian tradition. The name Anavatapta means "heat-free"; the waters of the lake were thought to be able to soothe the fires that torment living beings.

Anavatapta is also the name used for the legendary dragon that lived in the lake. It had become a bodhisattva, and was free from the distresses that tormente other dragons, which are plagued by fiery heat and preyed on by garudas.

== Description ==
According to Charles Higham, Lake Anavatapta was a "sacred Himalayan lake imbued with miraculous curative powers to remove human sins." George Cœdès states the lake, "... according to Indian tradition, is located in the confines of the Himalayas, and its waters gush out of gargoyles in the form of the heads of animals."

Lying south of Perfume Mountain, Lake Anavatapta is said to be 800 li in circumference and bordered by gold, silver, and precious stones. Four rivers issued from the lake. The earthly manifestation of the lake is often identified with Lake Manasarovar, which lies at the foot of Mount Kailash (Gandhamadana or Perfume Mountain) in the Himalayas. The four mythical rivers are sometimes identified as the Ganges (east), the Indus (south), the Amu Darya (west), and the Tarim (or the Yellow River) (north).

== See also ==
- Neak Pean
