= Banan district, Battambang =

Banan ស្រុកបាណន់
- District (srok)
- Map of Banan District in red
- Country: Cambodia
- Province: Battambang
- Communes: 8
- Villages: 72

Population (1998)
  - Total: 85,277
- Time zone: UTC+7 (ICT)
- Geocode: 0201

Banan (Khmer: បាណន់ [ɓaːnɑn]) is a district (srok) in Battambang Province in north-western Cambodia.

== Administration ==
The district is subdivided into 8 communes (khum) and 72 villages (phum).

=== Communes and villages ===
Khum (Communes)	Phum (Villages)
Kantueu Muoy	Thmei, Tuol Thnong, Svay Prey, Svay Bei Daeum, Kampong Ampil, Sasar Pok, Voat Kantueu
Kantueu Pir	Post Kantueu, Chamkar Ou, Banan, Kampang Lech, Kampang Kaeut, Chhay Rumpoat, Phnom Kul
Bay Damram	Tuol Chranieng, Kampong Chaeng, Kanhchroang, Krala Peas, Bay Damram, Ta Song, Sdau, Prey Totueng
Chheu Teal	Kampong Chamlang, Chheu Teal, Kampong Srama, Khnar, Enteak Chit, Bat Sala, Bay Damram, Svay Prakeab, Chhak Pou, Anlong Ta Mei, Chamkar Svay, Thkov, Praboh, Doung, Anlok Kaong
Chaeng Mean Chey	Rung, Chaeng, Kampong Kol Thmei, Thngor, Boh Khnor, Changhour Svay, Doang
Phnum Sampov	Chaeng Kdar, Kampov, Kouk Ampil, Sivuthea Kann, Sampov Kaeut, Samnanh, Kdaong, Krapeu Cheung, Krapeu Tboung, Krapeu Kaeut
Snoeng	Samraong, Kor, Snoeng Lech, Snoeng Kaeut, Boeng Chaeng, Boeng Prei, Peak Sbaek, Preah Srae, Rumchey, Sambuor Meas, Boeng Krasal
Ta Kream	Paoy Svay, Ta Kream, Thmei, Ou Pong Moan, Ta Ngaen, Prey Phdau, Ou Ta Nhea, Anlong Svay, Dangkut Thnong, Slab Pang, Andong Neang
