= Ta Prohm Kel =

Ta Prohm Kel (Prohm Kel)
- ប្រាសាទតាព្រហ្មកិល (ព្រហ្មកិល)
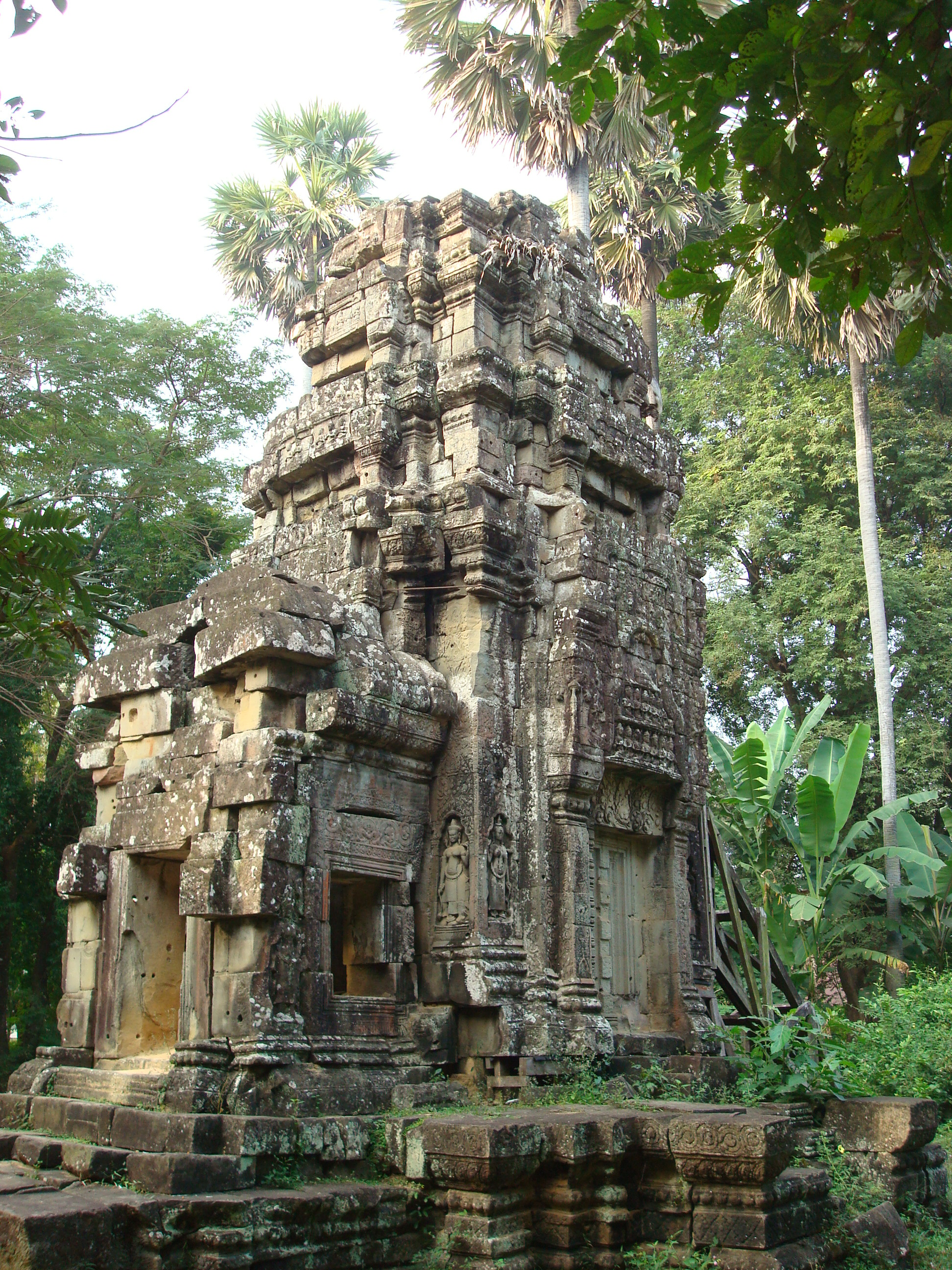
- The central sanctuary of the temple

- Location in Cambodia

Religion
- Affiliation: Hinduism
- Province: Siem Reap

Location
- Location: Angkor
- Country: Cambodia
- Interactive map of Ta Prohm Kel (Prohm Kel)
- Coordinates: 13°24′56″N 103°51′30″E

Architecture
- Type: Khmer (Bayon style)
- Creator: Jayavarman VII
- Completed: 1186 A.D
- Temple: 1 tower

Ta Prohm Kel or Prohm Kel (Khmer: ប្រាសាទតាព្រហ្មកិល ឬ ព្រហ្មកិល) is a small ruined sandstone monument in Angkor archaeological park, Siem Reap province, Cambodia.

Ta Prohm Kel was one of the 102 hospital chapels, some of which were already in existence, built by King Jayavarman VII all over the empire. The sanctuary opened to the east and had false doors on the other three sides. It was preceded by a small sandstone gopura, a little to the east of which traces remain. The decoration is in the style of the Bayon, with devatas and small roundels enclosing figures. A somasutra or channel for draining lustral water out of the shrine existed through the north wall of the sanctuary.

== See also ==
- Angkor Thom
- Bayon
- Neak Poan
- Jayavarman VII
- Traditional Cambodian medicine
