= Neak Pean =

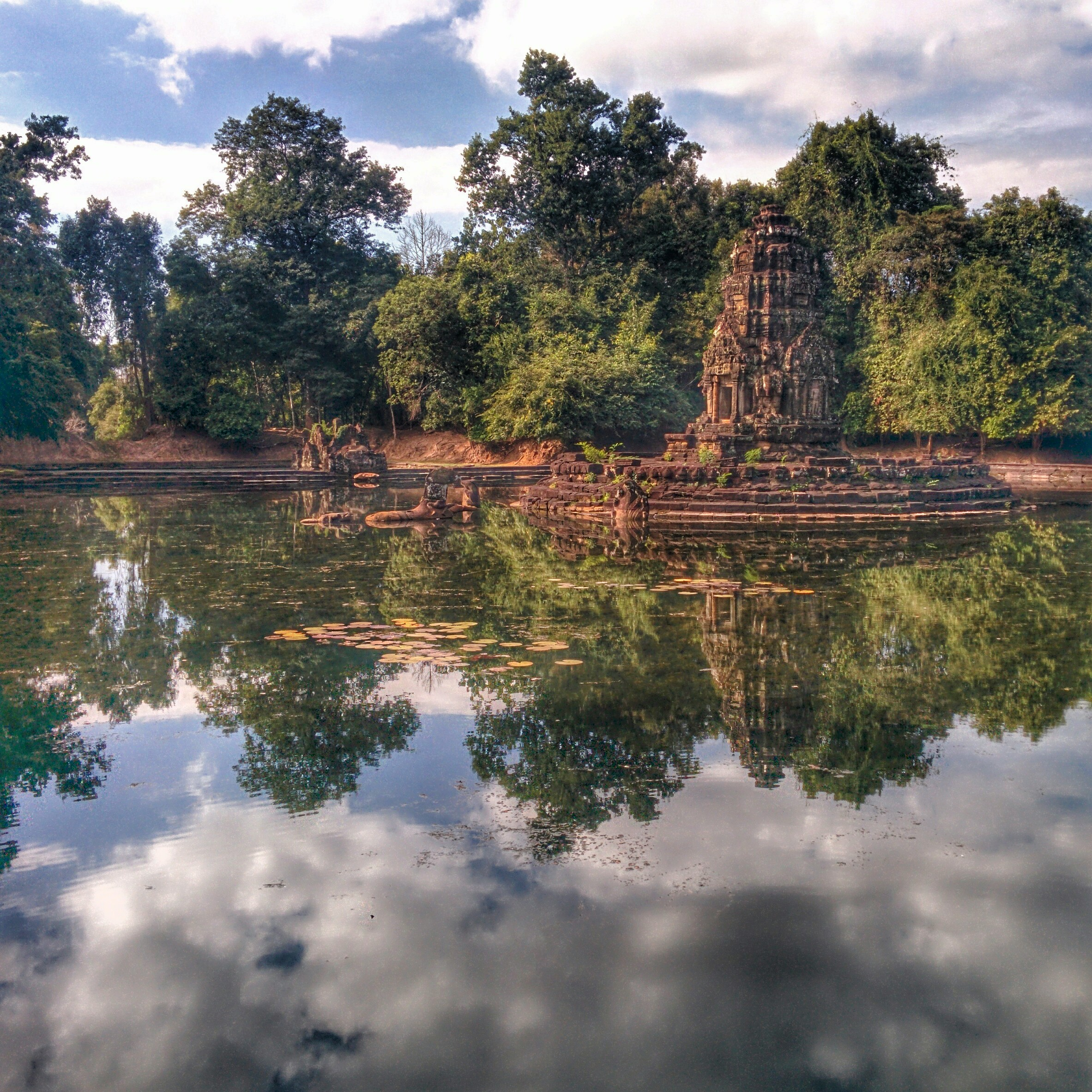
- The central pond at Neak Pean

- Location in Cambodia

Religion
- Affiliation: Hinduism
- Deity: Shiva

Location
- Location: Angkor
- Country: Cambodia
- Coordinates: 13°27′47″N 103°53′40″E

Architecture
- Type: Khmer
- Creator: Jayavarman VII
- Completed: second half of the 12th century

Neak Pean (or Neak Poan) (Khmer: ប្រាសាទនាគព័ន្ធ, "the entwined serpents") at Angkor, Cambodia is an artificial island with a Mahayana Buddhist temple on a circular island in Jayatataka Baray, which was associated with Preah Khan temple, built during the reign of King Jayavarman VII. It is the "Mebon" of the Preah Khan baray (the "Jayatataka" of the inscription).

== Etymology ==
Some historians believe that Neak Pean represents Anavatapta, a mythical lake in the Himalayas whose waters are thought to cure all illness. The name is derived from the sculptures of snakes (Nāga) running around the base of the temple structure, neak being the Khmer rendering of the Sanskrit naga. "They are Nanda and Upananda, two nagas traditionally associated with Lake Anavatapta."

== History ==
Neak Pean was originally designed for medical purposes (the ancients believed that going into these pools would balance the elements in the bather, thus curing disease); it is one of the many hospitals that Jayavarman VII built. It is based on the ancient Hindu belief of balance. Four connected pools represent Water, Earth, Fire, and Wind. Each is connected to the central water source, the main tank, by a stone conduit

"presided over by one of Four Great Animals (maha ajaneya pasu) namely Elephant, Bull, Horse, and Lion, corresponding to the north, east, south, and west quarters. ...The stone conduits in the little pavilions are fashioned to represent the heads of the Four Great Animals ... the only exception being that on the east, which represents a human head instead of a bull's."

Originally, four sculptures stood on the floor of the lake. The only remaining statue is that of the horse Balaha, a form of the bodhisattva Avalokitesvara, saving sailors from the ogresses of Tamradvipa. The temple on the lake was originally dedicated to Avalokitesvara. Willetts believed that

"this is Jayavarman as he would have wished to have appeared to his people"

Zhou Daguan refers to Neak Pean in his visit to Angkor in the late 13th century.

== Gallery ==

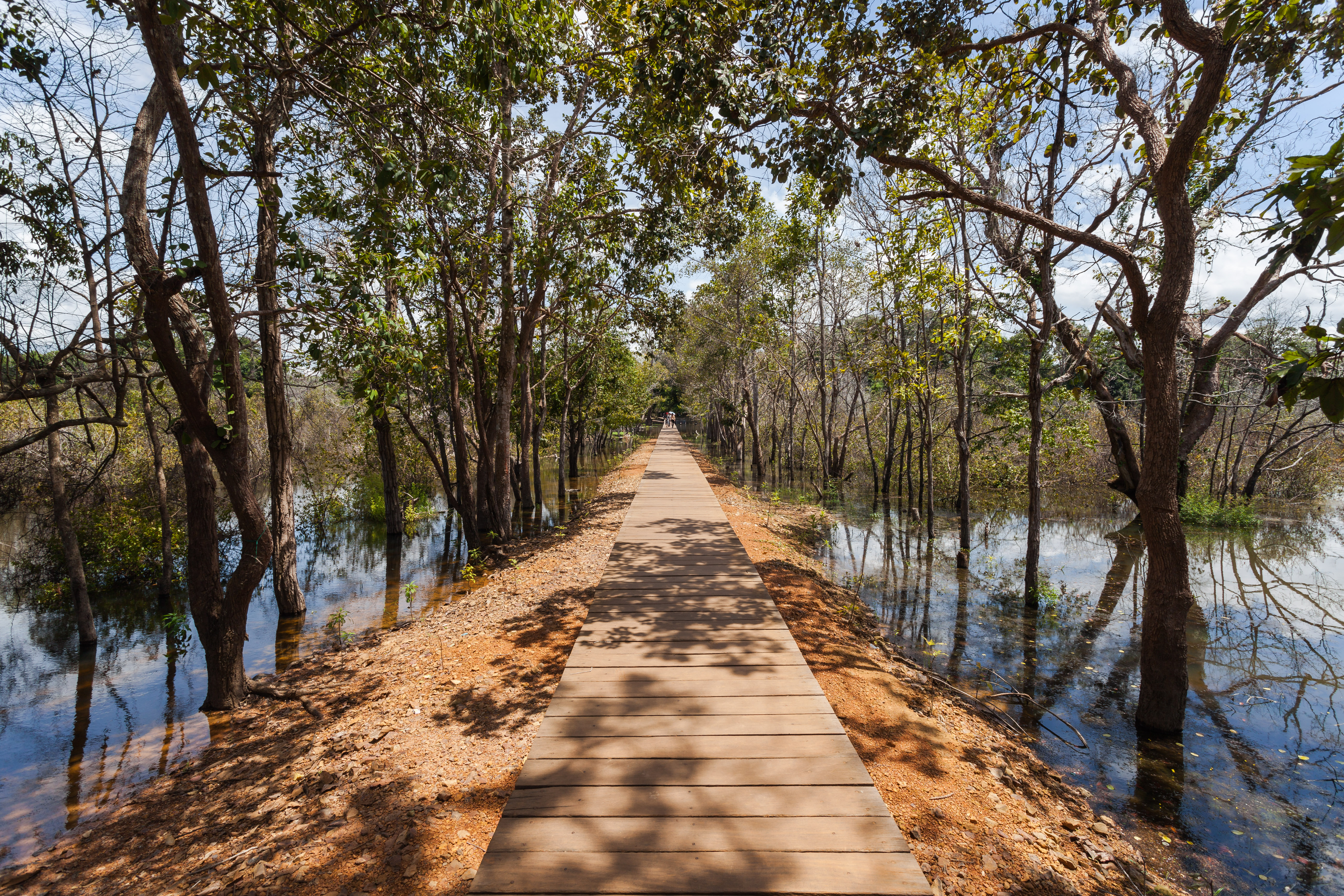

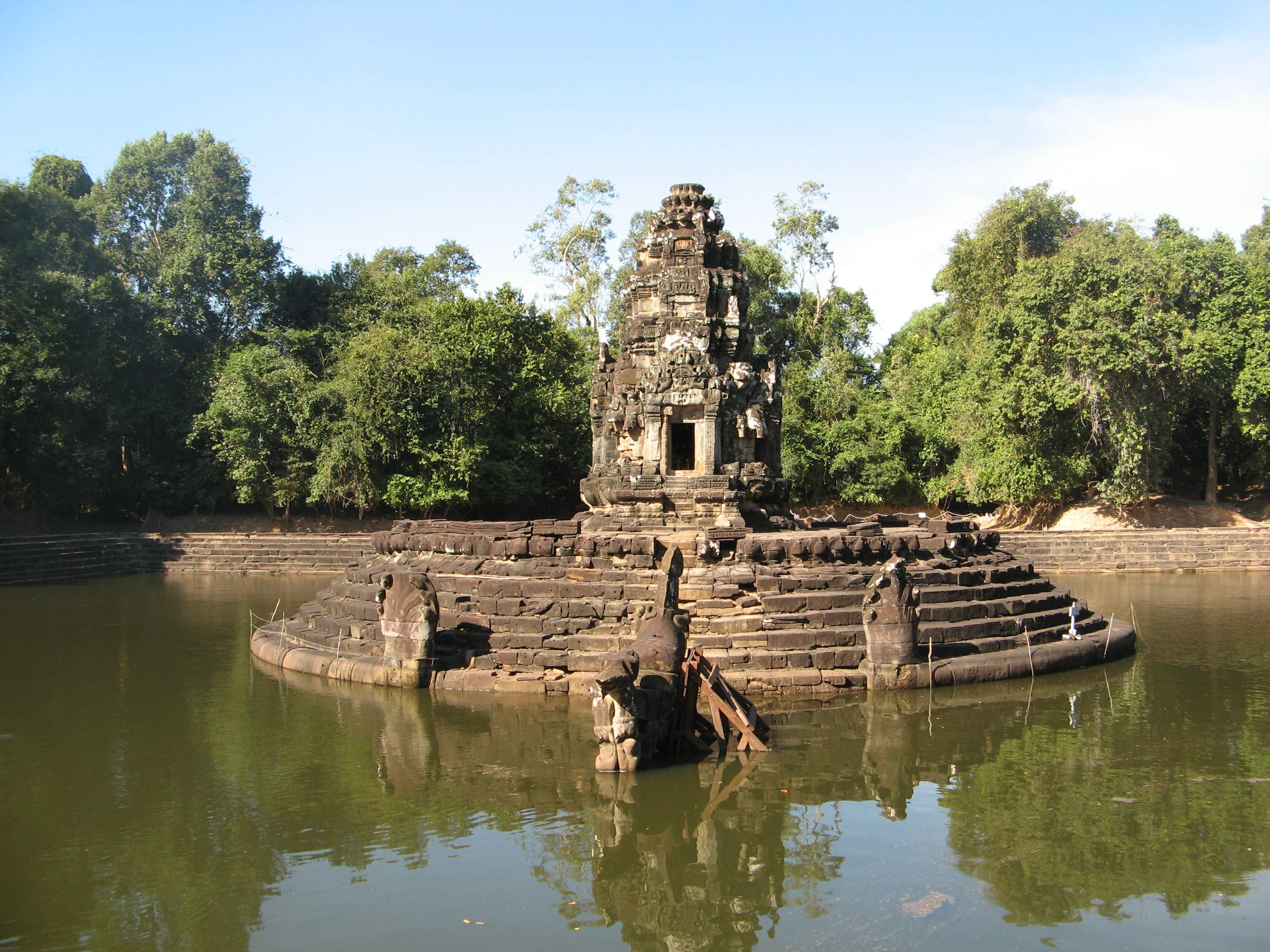

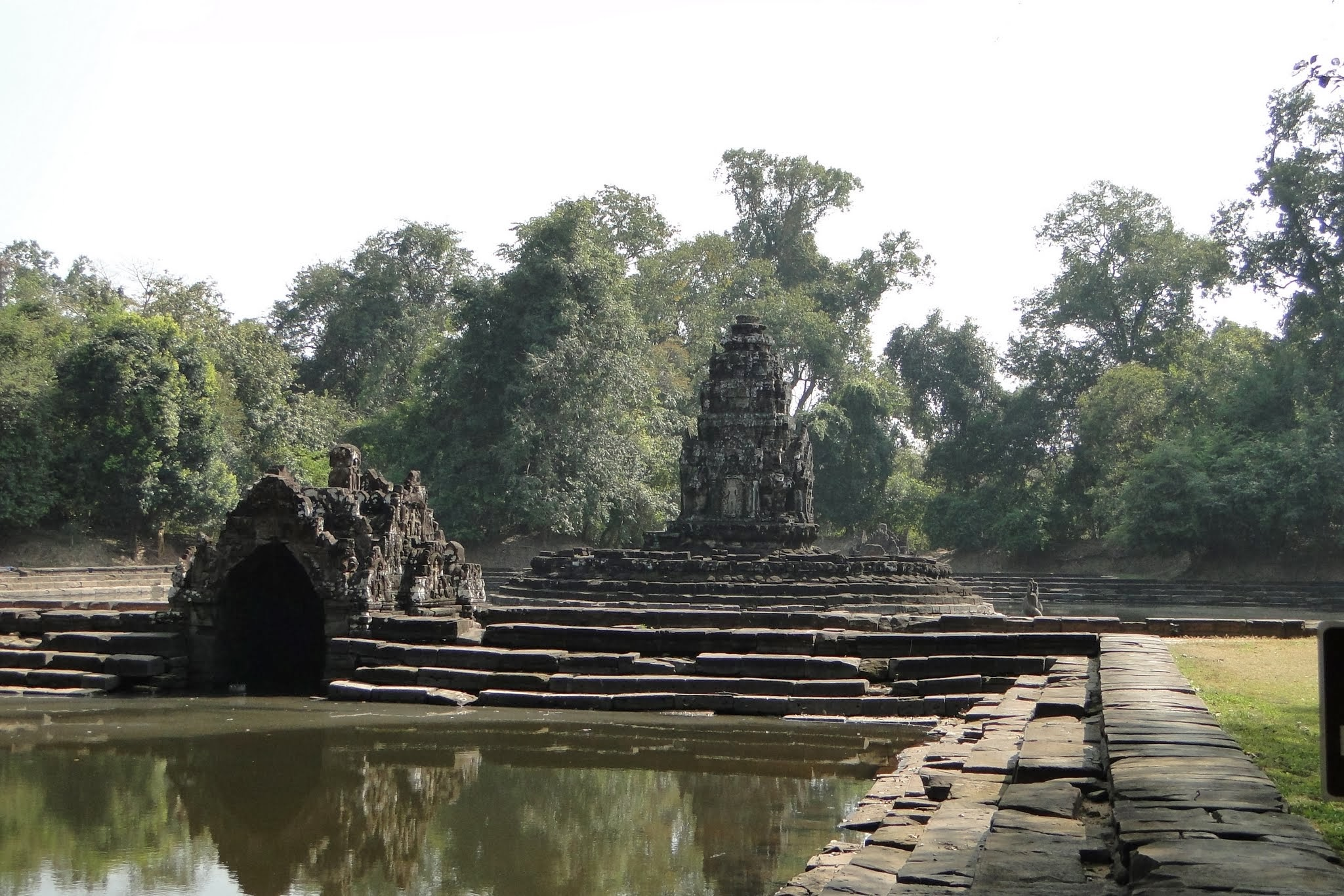

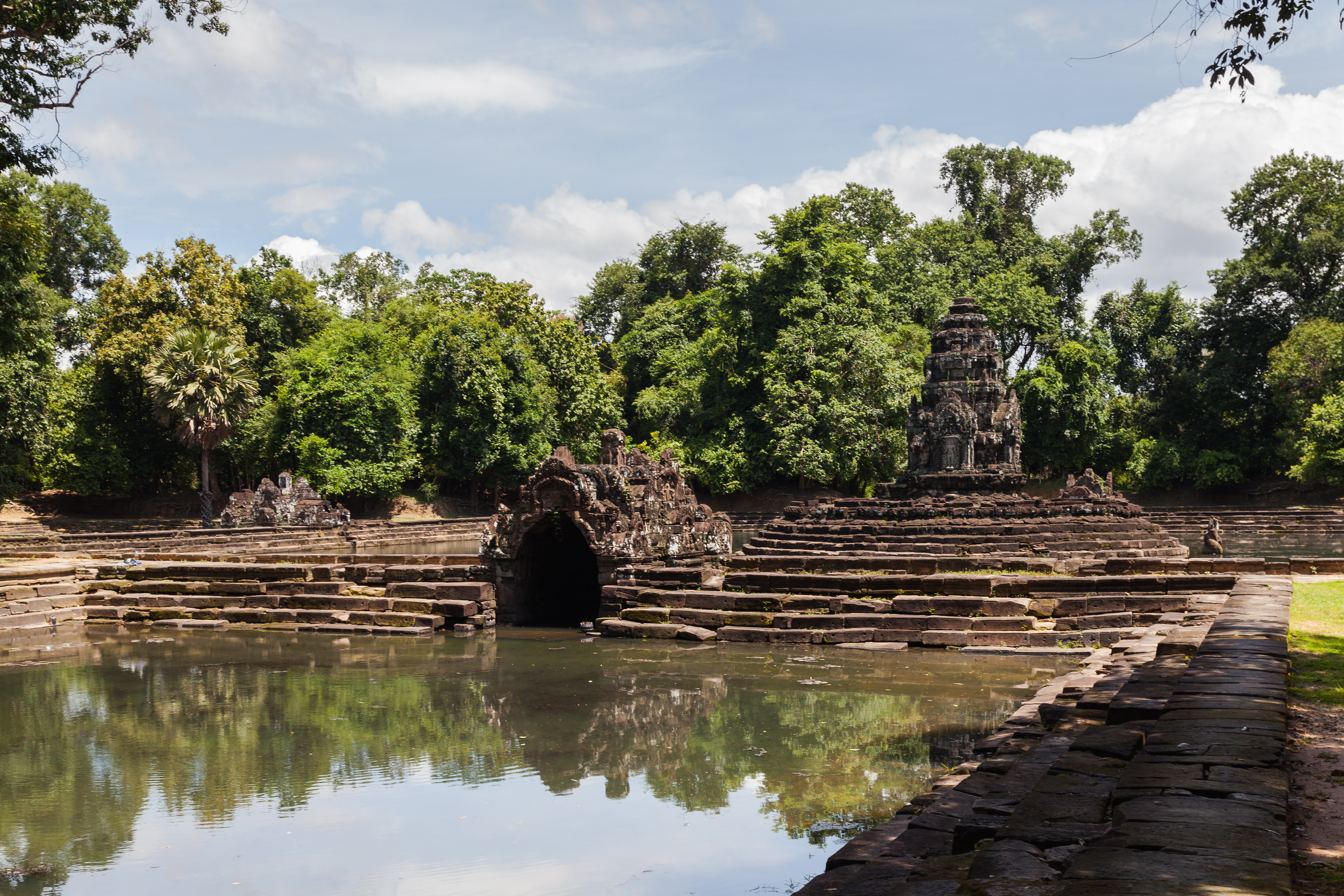

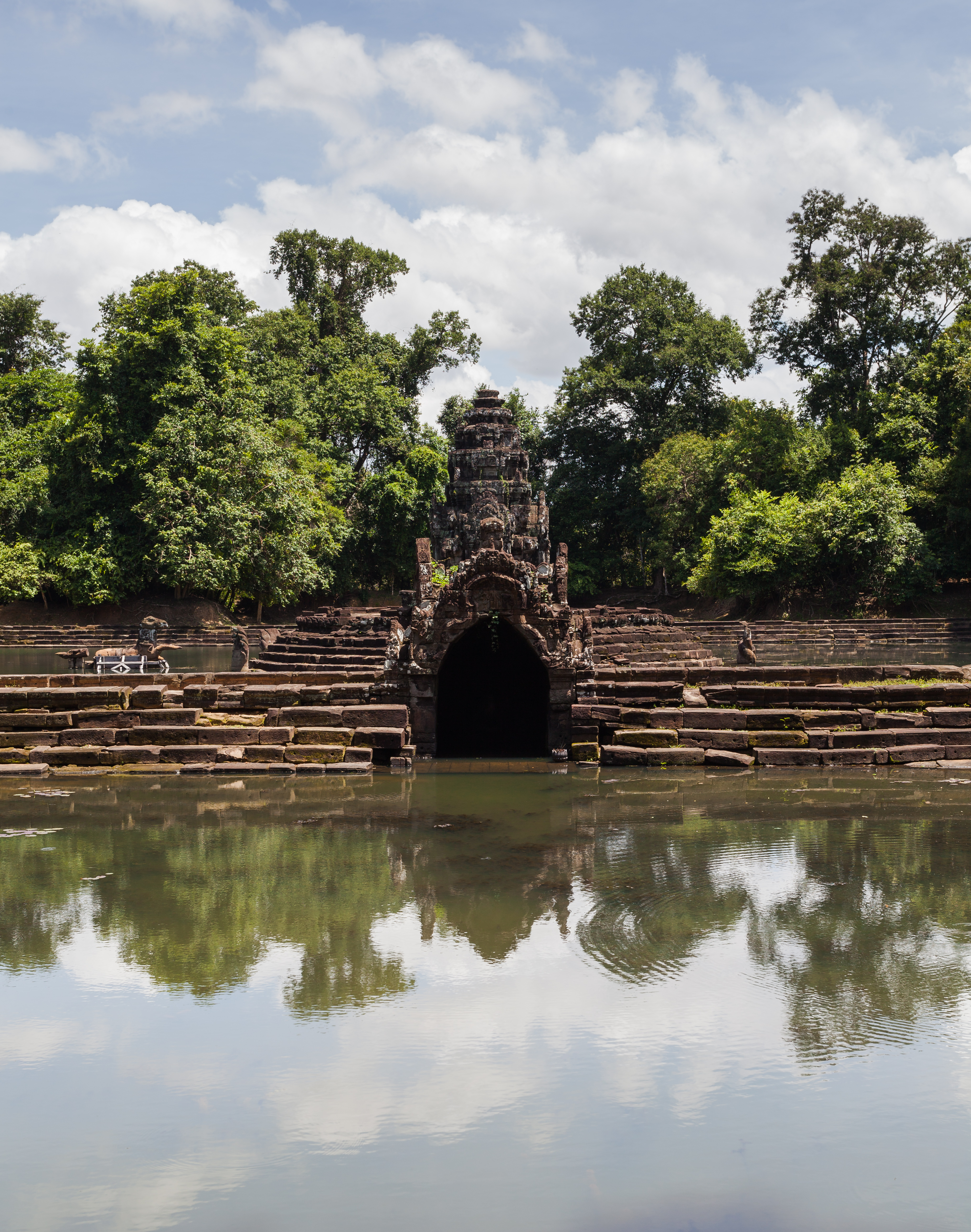

== See also ==
- Angkor
- Traditional Cambodian medicine
