= Mondulkiri wild honey =

Cambodian honey

Mondulkiri wild honey (Khmer: ទឹកឃ្មុំព្រៃមណ្ឌលគិរី) is honey harvested by the Bunong honey hunters from giant honey bee nests in the rainforests of Koh Nhek District, Pichreda District, Orang District, Keo Seima District, and Senmonorom in Mondulkiri province. It is an important commercial non-timber forest product for some of the Bunong people. 11 communities in the Mondulkiri province have been recognized as a "geographical honey forestry", nine of which fall under the protected wildlife sanctuary in Sre Pok and Phnom Prich, collecting a total of 150 to 200 tonnes of Mondulkiri wild honey a year.

== History ==
Prior to 2004 when honey gathering in Mondulkiri reached a commercial scale, it was almost exclusively collected for personal use (either household consumption or traditional medicine). Initially, the poor hygiene and high moisture contributed to the inconsistent quality of the Mondulkiri wild honey and the honey hunters were often subjected to unfair trade practices. In 2007, through a forest conservation program supported by the World Wildlife Fund, honey groups were established and honey collectors from villages around the Phnom Prich Wildlife Sanctuary and the Sre Pok Wildlife Sanctuary were trained in sustainable honey harvesting and honey processing methods, as well as honey quality. In December 2017, 3 honey groups had been established – in Krang Tesh (with 90 members), Srae Y (with 40 members) and Trapaeng Khaerm (with 90 members) –, while a fourth group at Pou Chrey with 26 members was in the process of being registered. Nowadays, the regional demand for Mondulkiri wild honey has increased dramatically and it has grown into a well-established industry with numerous intermediaries and other stakeholders.

On 29 January 2021, Mondulkiri wild honey was granted a domestic Protected Geographical Indication by the Ministry of Commerce of Cambodia. The certification ceremony was originally planned on 6 April 2021 but was cancelled due to the outbreak of COVID-19 in Cambodia and eventually took place on 26 March 2022.

== Harvesting ==
Mondulkiri wild honey is usually harvested in dry season from January to June, but peak season is from March to April or May. During wet season it is rarely collected due to low demand of such honey because of its high water content and no value in traditional medicine. Honey collectors form teams of two to five people that might change from trip to trip and go on harvest trips that usually last from two to five days. The honey collectors are almost exclusively men, while women take part in honey processing and marketing. The harvesting areas are usually reached on motorbikes and the harvesting commonly takes place during the daytime, although harvesting at night may sometimes be practiced in the case of aggregate nests and especially strong colonies.

Normally, each nest is harvested twice with the second harvest taking place approximately 2–3 weeks to 2 months after the first one. Due to the training in sustainable harvesting, the "one-cut take all" method has been largely replaced by a "honey head only" (ក្បាលទឹក, kbal teuk) approach where only around 80% of honey is taken and most of the time none of the brood. The third harvest is rare as the colony usually absconds after the second harvest.

The amount of honey harvested from a colony depends on the strength of the colony and the flower resources available to it. It can range from 2–3 to 10 liters or in some rare cases be even as high as 20 liters. The amount of honey collected on the whole trip depends on the length of the trip, village situation, the dedication and expertise of the honey collectors and luck.

Traditionally, a bee nest belonged to the first honey collectors to find it, who marked it by a small cut in the tree. Such marks were believed to possess magic power and honey collectors trying to steal from nests marked by other honey collectors to be stung multiple times. This practice has been preserved in some communities, mainly the ones still living in areas with significant forest cover (such as the Srae Y), while in others (such as Trapaeng Khaerm) there have been reports of opportunistic honey collectors harvesting from nests marked by others.

== Quality and price ==
Mondulkiri wild honey is susceptible to fermentation, crystallization and two-phase crystallization. Although fermentation is usually not seen as problematic by Cambodian consumers, crystalized honey is often perceived as either spoiled or adulterated. Mondulkiri honey may or may not crystalize depending on its floral origins. To prevent the honey from fermenting and to increase its marketability, the honey is dried in basic 8-shelf driers covered by plastic sheets and dehumidifiers to a moisture level of 20–21%, which has been found to be optimal for preventing both fermentation and crystalization.

Honey collectors sell their honey either to local village traders, traders in Sennonorom or the Mondulkiri Forest Venture (MFV) through honey groups. MFV purchases honey in April and May for an annually negotiated price and conducts quality control and produce traceability. It has defined three quality categories, based mainly on the honey's water content (19–20%, 20–21% and 21–22%). In 2005, the collectors were paid around US$2.50/L for their honey, but after the implementation of the forest conservation program, the price increased fivefold and in 2017 traders already offered US$10–12.50/L for honey harvested during the dry season and US$6.25–7.50/L for honey harvested in the wet season.

== In television ==
In Season 2 Episode 1 of Gordon's Great Escape, Gordon Ramsay travels to the Pou Pol village in Mondulkiri, where he participates in the gathering of wild honey and helps prepare a traditional dessert from the honey and pounded toasted sticky rice. Later, inspired by the dessert, Ramsay uses Mondulkiri wild honey to make a dessert for a dinner attended by the members of the Cambodian government and royalty.
