= Dak Dam =

Dak Dam ឃុំដាក់ដាំ
- Commune
- Location within Cambodia
- Coordinates: 12°24′N 107°34′E
- Country: Cambodia
- Province: Mondulkiri
- District: Ou Reang District
- Villages: 3
- Time zone: UTC+07
- Geocode: 110301

Dak Dam is a khum (commune) of Ou Reang District in Mondulkiri Province in north-eastern Cambodia.

== History ==
Dak Dam was first established in February 1933 as a French outpost built as fortified posts intended to protect the road on the Piste Richomme and strengthen the French presence in Indochina. It was known as the Camp Le Rolland, in honour of a French lieutenant who died of malaria while protecting the site. A group of Bunong led a rebellion against the French presence in February 1934 but was quickly controlled, while the Roth Chan, an Khmer civil servant, of another Bunong who had helped the French soldiers were executed by the rebellion.

In the following years, Dak Dam became a popular spot for hunting, with hunters coming all the way from Saigon.

In 1938, the French protectorate opened a dispensary in Dak Dam to shelter the sick and provide basic health assistance to locals. A school and boarding home was also built at the same time.

In 1968, Dak Dam was chosen by the indigenous FULRO insurgency against Vietnam to become its headquarters in replacement of the old French Camp Le Rolland across the border in Cambodia.

On the 16 and 17 November 1969, a border incident erupted in Dak Dam between the Royal Cambodian Army, the North Vietnamese Army, and the United States Army, involving the use of napalm by the US Army leaving from Bu Prang Camp after the mistaken identification of a Cambodian convoy. The Bu Prang Camp had been under fire from Vietnamese communists hiding in the surroundings of Dak Dam since the closure of Landing Zone Kate on November 1 of that same year. At least 25 Cambodians perished. It was the "most serious such incident" though the US government in an interview with Sisowath Sirik Matak on 23 November 1969 denied using the B-52 to bomb Dak Dam. Many in American were shocked by this incursion, as Noam Chomsky who criticized this "casual and callous disregard of Cambodian neutrality". and the US government finally paid $11,400 in reparations.

Between 10 and 11 January 1979, the Khmer revolutionary army of Pol Pot was attacked by Vietnamese troops helped by local Bunong rebels. Fierce battles took place. More than 100 Vietnamese troops were decimated, one piece of artillery was destroyed and large quantities of ammunition and war materials were captured.

== Administration ==
As of 2021, the commune includes 3 phums (villages) as follows.

- Pu Traeng
- Pu Leh
- Pu Chhab

== Nature ==
=== Climate ===
Dak Dam has a relatively cool South-East Asian tropical climate. Dak Dam is the village in Cambodia with the lowest temperature mean at 67 °F as well as the lowest extreme low temperature of 64 °F.

Dak Dam holds a Cambodian record of 170 days of rain in a year, which is more than on Mount Bokor (166) or Kampot (124).

=== Fauna ===
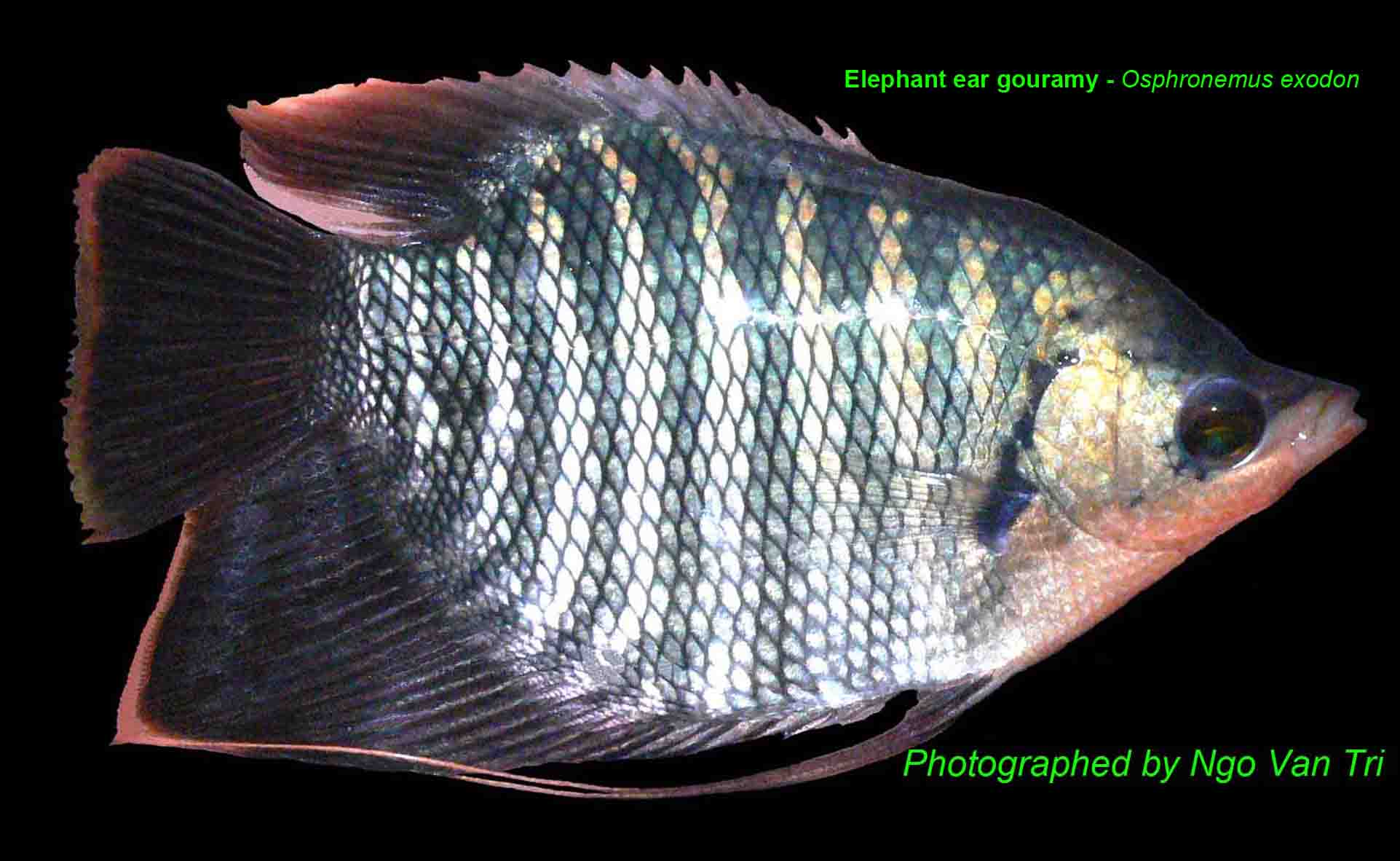
Elephant ear gourami caught in the Dak Dam River

Dak Dam has a rich fauna. It is an essential asset for the Phnong population as the majority of households have hunted and trapped wildlife and gathered food and other products from the forest for generations.

The Dak Dam river site is important for its populations of green peafowl Pavo muticus and white-winged duck Cairina scutulata. Long-tailed macaque Macaca fascicularis has also been recorded at Dak Dam Stream as of 1998 as well as the Asian elephant Elephas maximus, gaur Bos gaurus and banteng Bos javanicus. However, Brickle could not rule out the possibility that the tracks used to record Asian Elephant came from domestic animals alone.

=== Flora ===
Dak Dam is the set of a beautiful flora, considered "a relatively undisturbed riverine forest, one of the most threatened habitat types in South-East Asia". In recent years, its forest has been threatened by tree logging as well as forest clearing, especially in the nearby Phnom Nam Lyr Wildlife Sanctuary as late as of May 2020.

== Tourism ==
In recent, Dak Dam has seen growing interest for eco- and ethnotourism.

Among other destinations, the Dak Dam Waterfall as well the Andong Snae mountain, or Well of Love, are most popular among tourists.
