= Conservation of slow lorises =

Conservation management of the nocturnal primates in Asia

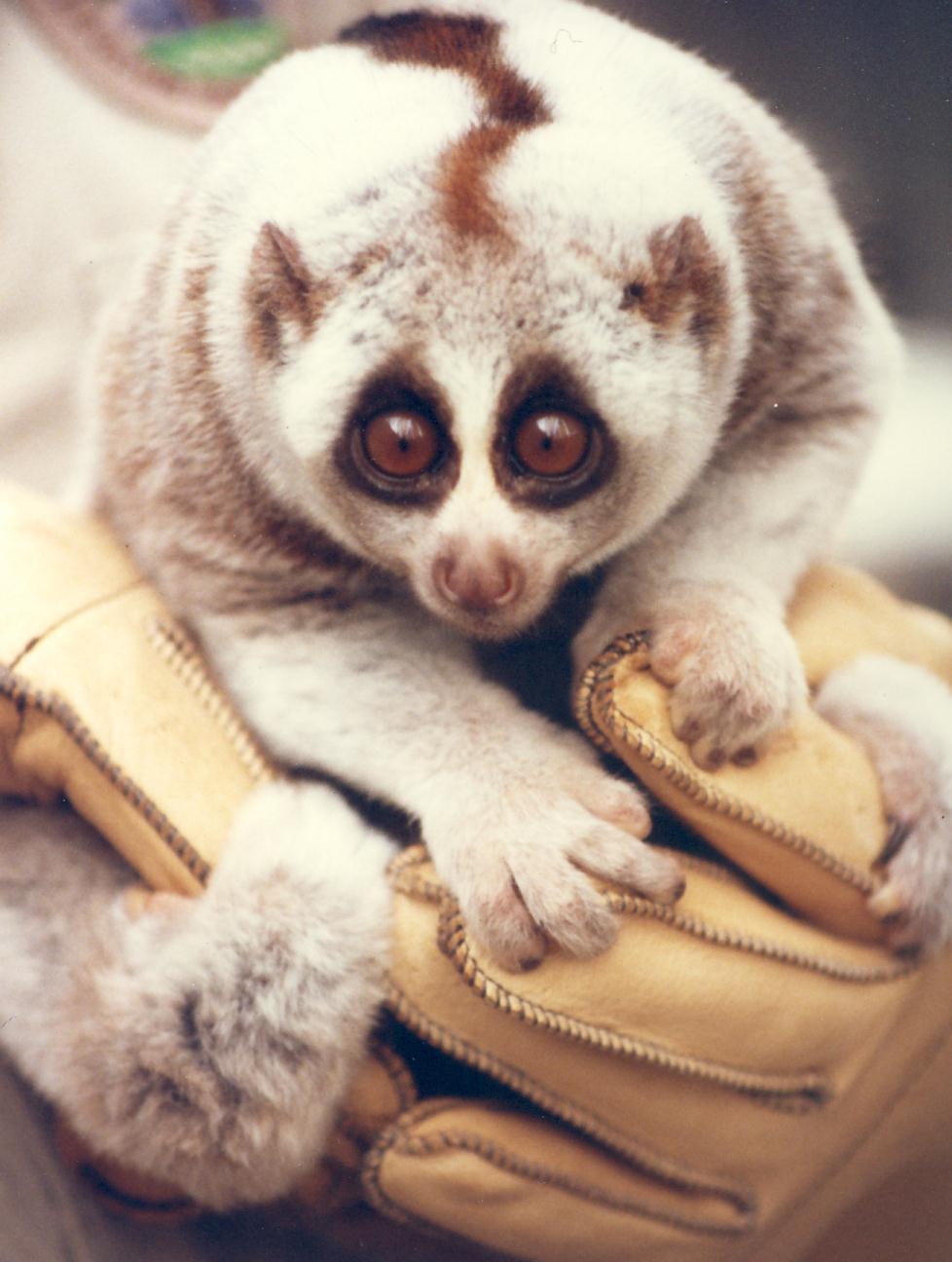
Slow lorises, such as this Bengal slow loris (Nycticebus bengalensis) were once considered common, but are now recognized as threatened species.

Slow lorises are nocturnal strepsirrhine primates in the genus Nycticebus that live in the rainforests of South and Southeast Asia. They are threatened by habitat loss and fragmentation from deforestation, selective logging, and slash-and-burn agriculture, as well as by collection and hunting for the wildlife trade, including the exotic pet trade, and for use in traditional medicine and as bushmeat. Because of these and other threats, all five species of slow loris are listed as either "Vulnerable" or "Endangered" by the International Union for Conservation of Nature (IUCN). Their conservation status was originally listed as "Least Concern" in 2000 because of imprecise population surveys and the frequency in which these primates were found in animal markets. Because of their rapidly declining populations and local extinctions, their status was updated and in 2007 the Convention on International Trade in Endangered Species of Wild Fauna and Flora (CITES) elevated them to Appendix I, which prohibits international commercial trade. Local laws also protect slow lorises from hunting and trade, but enforcement is lacking in most areas.

Traditional beliefs regarding slow lorises have been part of the folklore of Southeast Asia for at least several hundred years. Their remains are buried under houses and roads to bring good fortune, and every part of their body is used in traditional medicine to make products ranging from love potions to unproven cures for cancer, leprosy, epilepsy, and sexually transmitted diseases. The primary users of this traditional medicine are urban, middle-aged women who are reluctant to consider alternatives.

Despite being poor pets that are difficult to care for, with a dangerous toxic bite and a sleep cycle opposite to that of humans, a large number of slow lorises are traded as pets, both locally and internationally. Although it is illegal to import slow lorises for commercial sale, they are popular exotic pets in their native range, Japan and parts of Europe. This is mainly because of their "cute" appearance, popularized in highly viewed YouTube videos, which is due in part to their large eyes, adaptations to a nocturnal lifestyle. Hundreds of slow lorises have been confiscated at airports, but because they are easy to hide, these numbers are likely to be only a small fraction of the total number being trafficked. Traders cut or pull the teeth of slow lorises to make them appear to be an appropriate pet for small children, but this practice often leads to extreme blood loss, infection, and death. Slow lorises lacking their teeth would be unable to fend for themselves and therefore are not reintroduced into the wild. Most captive lorises in the pet trade also receive improper care and die from poor nutrition, stress, or infection. Despite this, demand has risen, and slow lorises are no longer captured opportunistically, but are now hunted on a commercial scale using flashlights, from which the animals do not flee.

Connected protected areas are important for the conservation of slow lorises because these primates are not adapted to travel long distances on the ground. Training for enforcement officials helps improve identification and the awareness of their legal protection. Sanctuaries and rescue facilities are available to provide both temporary and lifelong care for confiscated slow lorises. Zoo populations of some species have not bred much and have grown too old to reproduce, although the pygmy slow loris is doing well at some facilities, such as the San Diego Zoo.

== Background ==
Slow lorises (genus Nycticebus) are primates that belong to the suborder Strepsirrhini. They are found throughout South and Southeast Asia and the surrounding islands, and live in the upper canopy of tropical rainforests. They are nocturnal, sleeping during the day curled up in the fork of a tree. Slow lorises are slow and deliberate climbers and rarely come to the ground. They have a round face, woolly fur, a dark stripe down their back, and a tail that is reduced to a stump. Their head and body length ranges from 18 to 38 cm (7.1 to 15.0 in). Their hands and feet are strong and good at grasping for long periods of time. Slow lorises are either solitary or live in pairs; the males are territorial and mark their territories with urine. Their diet consists of mollusks, small vertebrates, and fruit.

Slow lorises can produce a secretion on their brachial gland (a gland on their arm) which when mixed with their saliva creates a volatile, noxious toxin that can be, if necessary, delivered in a bite to an aggressor. A bite causes a painful swelling and is slow to heal; the toxin is mild and not typically fatal, although an anaphylactic reaction is possible.

Five species are currently recognized. The Javan slow loris (N. javanicus) is native to the Indonesian island of Java, whereas the Bornean slow loris (N. menagensis) can be found on Borneo and nearby islands, including the Sulu Islands in the Philippines. The Sunda slow loris is found on the Indonesian island of Sumatra as well as Peninsular Malaysia, Singapore, and Thailand. The other two species are found entirely on the mainland, with the Bengal slow loris (N. bengalensis) native to Bangladesh, Cambodia, southern China, Northeast India, Laos, Myanmar, Thailand, and Vietnam and the pygmy slow loris (N. pygmaeus) found in Cambodia, Laos, Vietnam, and southern China. Nekaris and Nijman (2022) combined morphological, behavioural, karyotypical and genetic data and suggested that pygmy lorises are best placed in their own genus, Xanthonycticebus.

== Threats in the wild ==
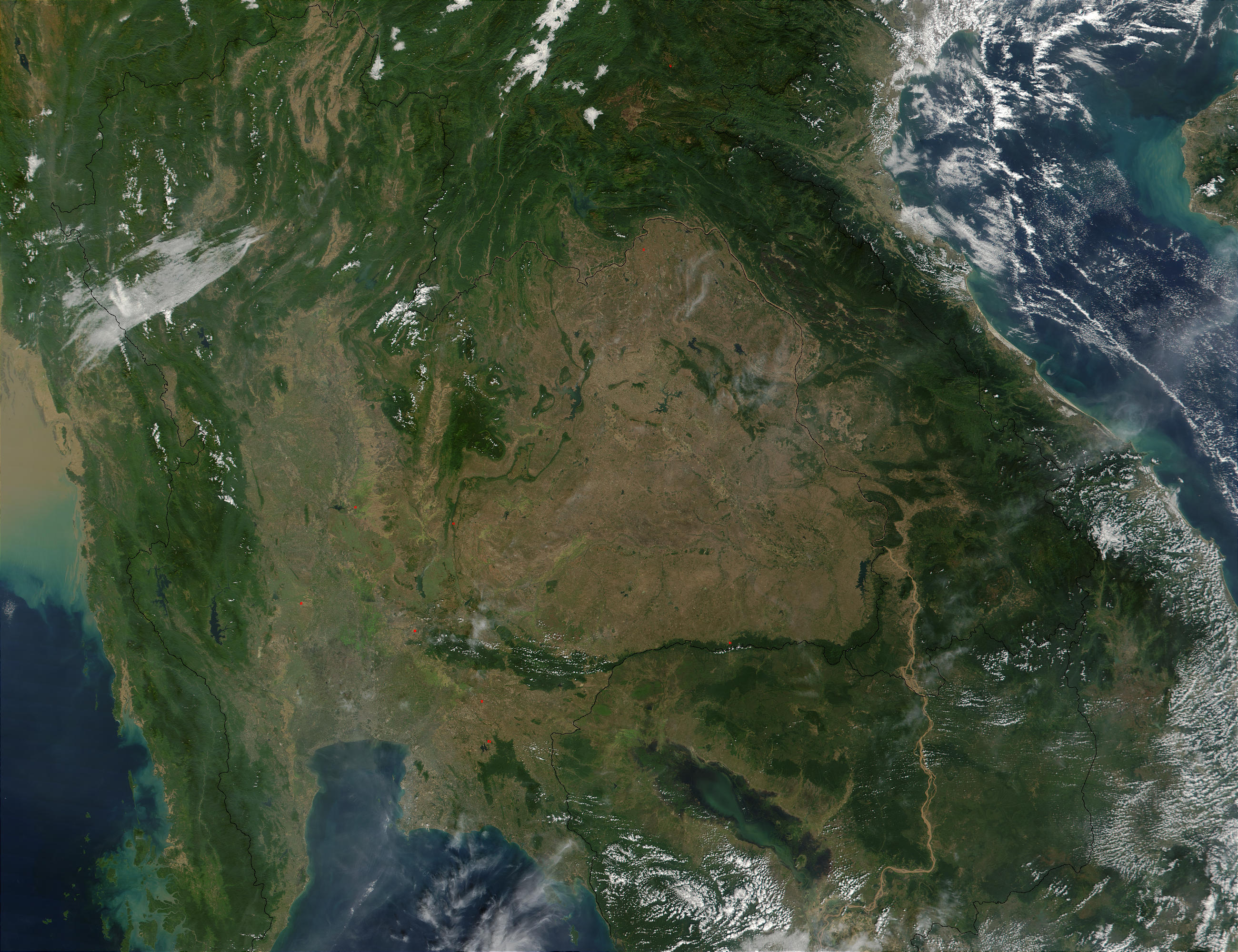
Deforestation is a threat to slow lorises throughout their range. By 2001, mainland Southeast Asia had lost much of its forest cover.

Slow lorises are threatened by deforestation and the wildlife trade, which includes the exotic pet trade, traditional medicine, and bushmeat. Other threats includes road construction, selective logging, and slash and burn agriculture. Habitat fragmentation obstructs biological dispersal for these species that rely on vines and lianas to move from tree to tree. Consequently, slow lorises are found dead on power lines or are victims of roadkill in areas where roads cut between forest patches.

All species are listed either as "Vulnerable" or "Endangered" by the International Union for Conservation of Nature (IUCN). Populations are rapidly declining, and their distribution is becoming patchy because of local extinctions throughout their range. Although all species are protected by law in every country in which they occur, conservation efforts are hindered by a lack of public awareness, since many local villagers and remoter buyers of captive specimens are unaware of their endangered status. Recognition and awareness of slow lorises is even low among national park staff. In places like Vietnam, where these nocturnal primates have commonly been found, most local villagers were not familiar with them when shown photos. Only a few older hunters recognized them, but pointed out that they had not seen them in more than 10 or 15 years.

Traditionally, the slow lorises were thought to consist of very few species and were considered to be common across Southeast Asia. These assumptions were due to their nocturnal behavior and their high frequency of occurrence in animal markets throughout the region. Furthermore, researchers from the 20th century and earlier perpetuated the notion that slow lorises were common by reporting them as either present or absent rather than noting low population densities in their field research. As a result, slow lorises were seldom studied, resulting in the initial "Lower Risk/least concern" (LR/lc) conservation status assessment on the IUCN Red List (version 2.3) in 2000. Even in the mid-2000s, population estimates were based only on small surveys.

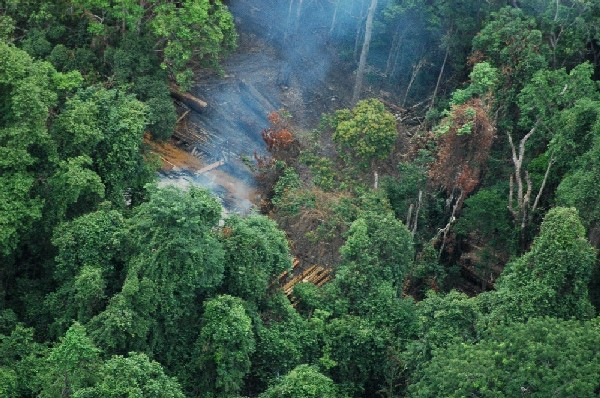
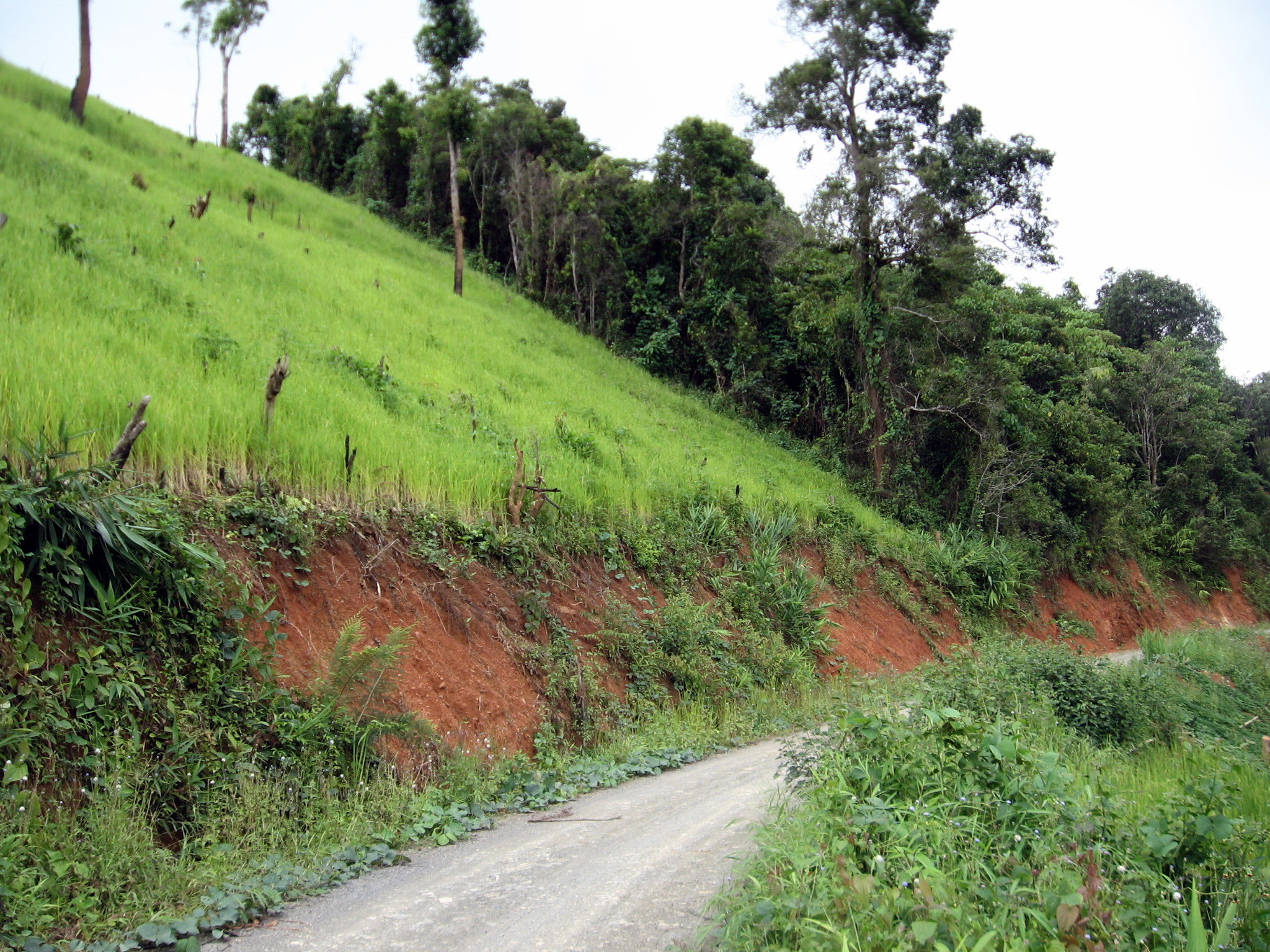
Other threats to slow lorises include selective logging, such as that in the Koh Kong Province of Cambodia (left), and increased agriculture, such as this upland rice field on a steep slope in southern Yunnan Province in China (right).

In 2009, primatologist James Thorn used environmental niche modelling in Indonesia to supplement the poor population data gathered to date to predict the remaining available habitat for slow lorises on the islands of Sumatra, Java, and Borneo. These estimates indicated that the Javan slow loris was the most threatened by habitat loss, followed by the Sunda slow loris from Sumatra. The Bornean slow loris was in a better situation since much of its range consists of low-risk areas. Both the Bengal slow loris and pygmy slow loris are found in more than 20 protected areas, although their populations are either low or insufficiently recorded.

In Indonesia, logging and the clearing of land for agriculture have triggered large forest fires, first in between 1982 and 1983 when 27,000 km^{2} (10,000 sq mi) burned in Kalimantan, and then again between 1997 and 1998 when 23,750 km^{2} (9,170 sq mi) burned in Kalimantan and Sumatra. These fires occurred within the native range of slow loris populations.

Although habitat loss has been significant throughout the range of the slow lorises, their decline is most closely associated with unsustainable trade, either for exotic pets or for traditional medicine. Slow lorises are abundant at the markets and are among the most commonly sold primates. Slow lorises are easy to catch because they do not leap from tree to tree, often freezing and covering their face when spotted. (For this reason, Indonesians call them malu malu or "shy one".) They are hunted not only by expert hunters, but are also easily caught by opportunist villagers because of the financial reward they bring at the markets.

== Traditions and beliefs affecting conservation ==
Traditional beliefs and uses for slow lorises vary, and many practices appear to have deep roots going back at least 300 years. Oral traditions suggest these practices go back even further. In the late 1800s and early 1900s, it was reported that the people from the interior of the island of Borneo believed that slow lorises were the gatekeepers for the heavens and that each person had a personal slow loris waiting for them in the afterlife. More often, however, slow lorises are used in traditional medicine or to ward off evil.

In the Mondulkiri Province of Cambodia, hunters believe that lorises can heal their own broken bones immediately after falling from a branch in order to climb back up the tree, and that slow lorises have medicinal powers because they require more than one hit with a stick to die. The hunters also believe that seeing a slow loris will bring bad luck on a hunting trip. In the province of North Sumatra, the slow loris is thought to bring good luck if it is buried under the foundation of a house. Similarly, villagers concerned about traffic safety might bury a slow loris under a road to prevent accidents. In Java, it is thought that putting a piece of its skull in a water jug would make a husband more docile and submissive, just like a slow loris in the daytime. Also, its body parts were used to place curses on enemies in North Sumatra. More recently, researchers have documented the belief that the consumption of loris meat was an aphrodisiac that improves "male power". The gall bladder of the Bengal slow loris has historically been used to make ink for tattoos by the village elders in Pursat and Koh Kong Provinces of Cambodia.

== Legal protection ==
The trade in slow lorises, whether as pets or for medicine, is illegal because every nation in which they occur naturally has laws protecting them. Cambodia lists them as protected, with penalties of one month in prison and fines of US$2.50 to US$250 in 2010 for anyone who catches, hunts, poisons, or transports them. In Indonesia, the slow loris trade has been illegal since 1973, when the Agriculture Ministry passed Decree No. 66. This regulation was clarified in 1999 with Government Regulation No. 7 ("Protection of Wild Flora and Fauna") and Act No. 5 ("Biodiversity Conservation"). Violators are subject to five years in prison and a fine of 100 million rupiah (~US$10,000).

The Convention on International Trade in Endangered Species of Wild Fauna and Flora (CITES) first listed the two known species of slow loris under Appendix II on 7 January 1975. All newly identified species were covered by Appendix II on 2 April 1977 when all primates were given either Appendix I or Appendix II protection. Appendix II only requires an export permit for international trade, as long as trade will not negatively impact the survival of wild populations. Most of the trade in slow lorises, however, is illegal and usually involves smuggling to Japan. The lack of legal trade reported to the CITES Secretariat is shown in the CITES trade database, where minimal trade by CITES Parties has been reported up until 2007. Regardless, slow lorises remained vulnerable to international trade under Appendix II, and the rampant Southeast Asian pet trade was another reason for concern. As a result, Cambodia proposed that slow lorises be elevated to Appendix I, which prohibits species from being traded internationally for commercial purposes and requires both import and export permits for certain types of non-commercial trade, such as scientific research. The proposal covered all three species recognized at the time—the Sunda slow loris, Bengal slow loris, and pygmy slow loris—because they have traditionally been managed collectively owing to a lack of knowledge as to how to distinguish them.

Before the CITES conference at which a vote would be taken on the proposal, support for the proposed change in status appeared to be limited because of the small amount of reported legal trade. In April 2007, the non-profit conservation group ProFauna Indonesia attracted news coverage with a demonstration held in Malang, Java. The demonstration—an appeal for increased protection for slow lorises—involved organization members suspending themselves from bridges while holding banners that read "Stop jual kukang" ("Stop the slow loris trade") and "Jangan beli kukang" ("Don't buy slow lorises"). From early to mid-June, the 14th CITES Conference of the Parties (CITES COP-14) was held in The Hague, Netherlands. On 8 June, Cambodia presented the proposal along with their rationale. Indonesia followed by announcing their support, along with Japan, India, Laos, Thailand, the United States, the European Union, Qatar, and many non-governmental organizations (NGOs). Although the proposal was adopted by consensus, some conservation groups objected on the grounds that rational analysis was being usurped by sentiment.

Despite the added protection of CITES Appendix I status, wild slow lorises still receive poor protection because enforcement of the international trade ban is difficult and the penalties are minor. Slow lorises are still found in large numbers at animal markets, most notably in Cambodia and Indonesia, but the traders show no concern for being caught. During a study by Nekaris et al. published in 2010, vendors in Medan, Jakarta, and Surabaya spoke freely to researchers about how they obtain slow lorises, their uses in medicine, prices, and sales numbers. The markets were not concealed, but were open daily in a designated area in town. Even law enforcement is involved in the trade, with park rangers and police admitting to the purchase of slow lorises for medicinal purposes. The wife of another law enforcement official from the Mondulkiri Province in Cambodia is one of the most notable sellers of slow loris parts.

== Wildlife trade ==
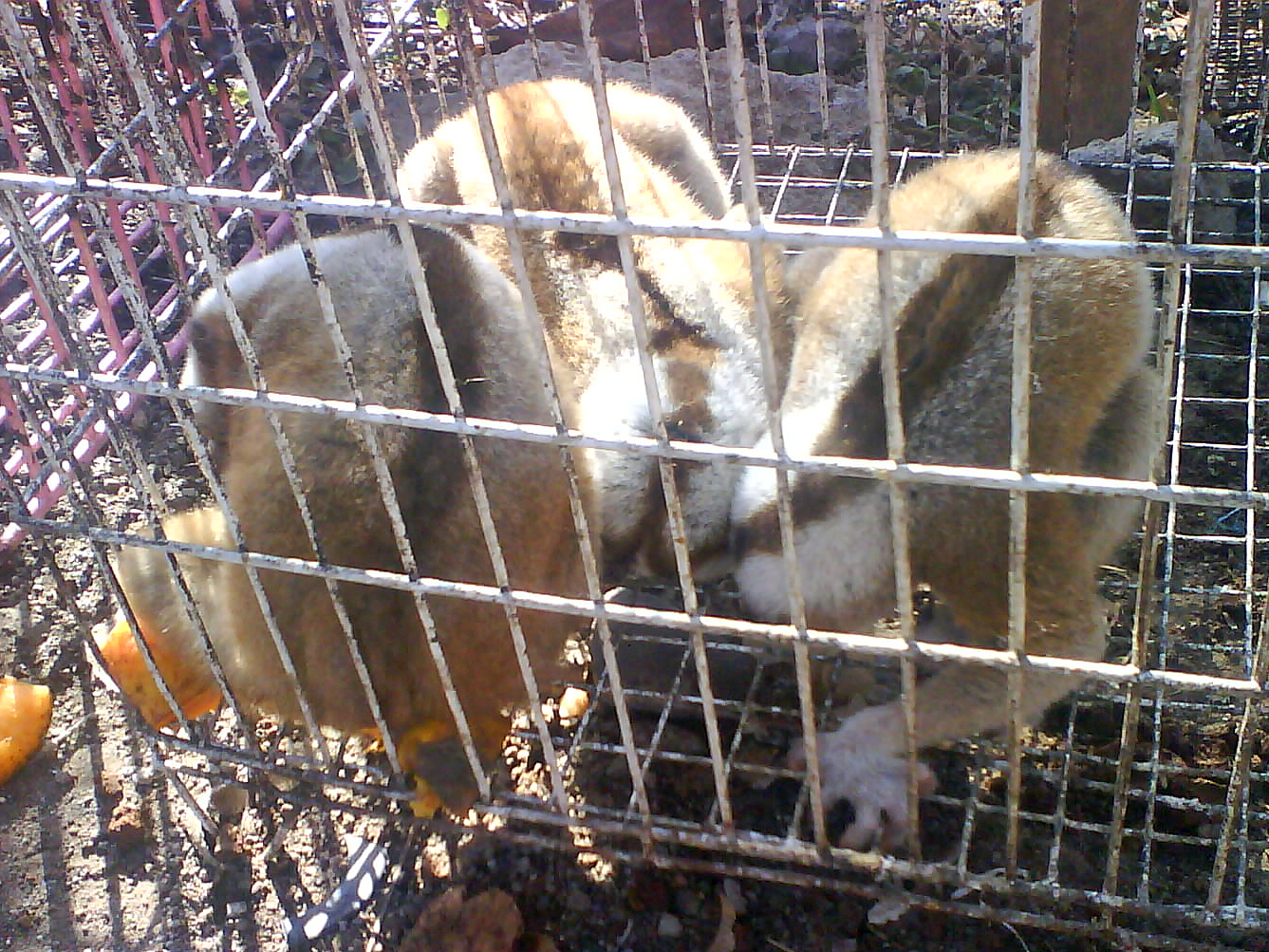
Slow lorises are sold in Southeast Asia either as pets or for use in traditional medicine.

Humans have been hunting mammals in Asia for at least 40,000 years, but until recently, slow lorises were only hunted at a sustainable level. However, hunting pressure since the 1960s has become increasingly unsustainable, leading to overexploitation, because of growing demand, decreased supply, and the subsequent increased value of the marketed wildlife. In 1985, large wildlife markets began to appear in Phnom Penh and Sen Monorom, Cambodia, followed quickly by the development of networks of hunters, traders, and middlemen. Bright flashlights make spotting slow lorises much easier at night because of their eye shine, and in the 1990s, large-scale commercial harvesting of slow lorises began as improved batteries for spotlights became available.

The drive to capture wildlife, and particularly slow lorises, is increasingly dominated by demands from wealthy urban areas, replacing the subsistence hunting traditionally performed in poor rural areas. In the case of long-lived primates, such as the slow lorises, populations replenish themselves slowly. Slow lorises are particularly vulnerable because they tend to freeze when spotted. Lastly, increased access to new technologies, such as improved transport, guns, wire snares, and spotlights, have facilitated hunting and pushed extraction levels beyond the point of sustainability. These new factors threaten slow loris survival.

Opportunistic hunting of lorises has been a traditional practice, for example, when a tree in which the primate is living is cut down. When forests are cleared to create oil palm (Elaeis guineensis) plantations or for housing, the lorises are collected from the trees and then sold to the "loris man", who in turn sells them in the cities. Timber merchants in Kalimantan and Aceh also sell slow lorises to traders, and since the primates cling to branches instead of fleeing, they are often transported hundreds of miles on the original tree branches to which they clung.

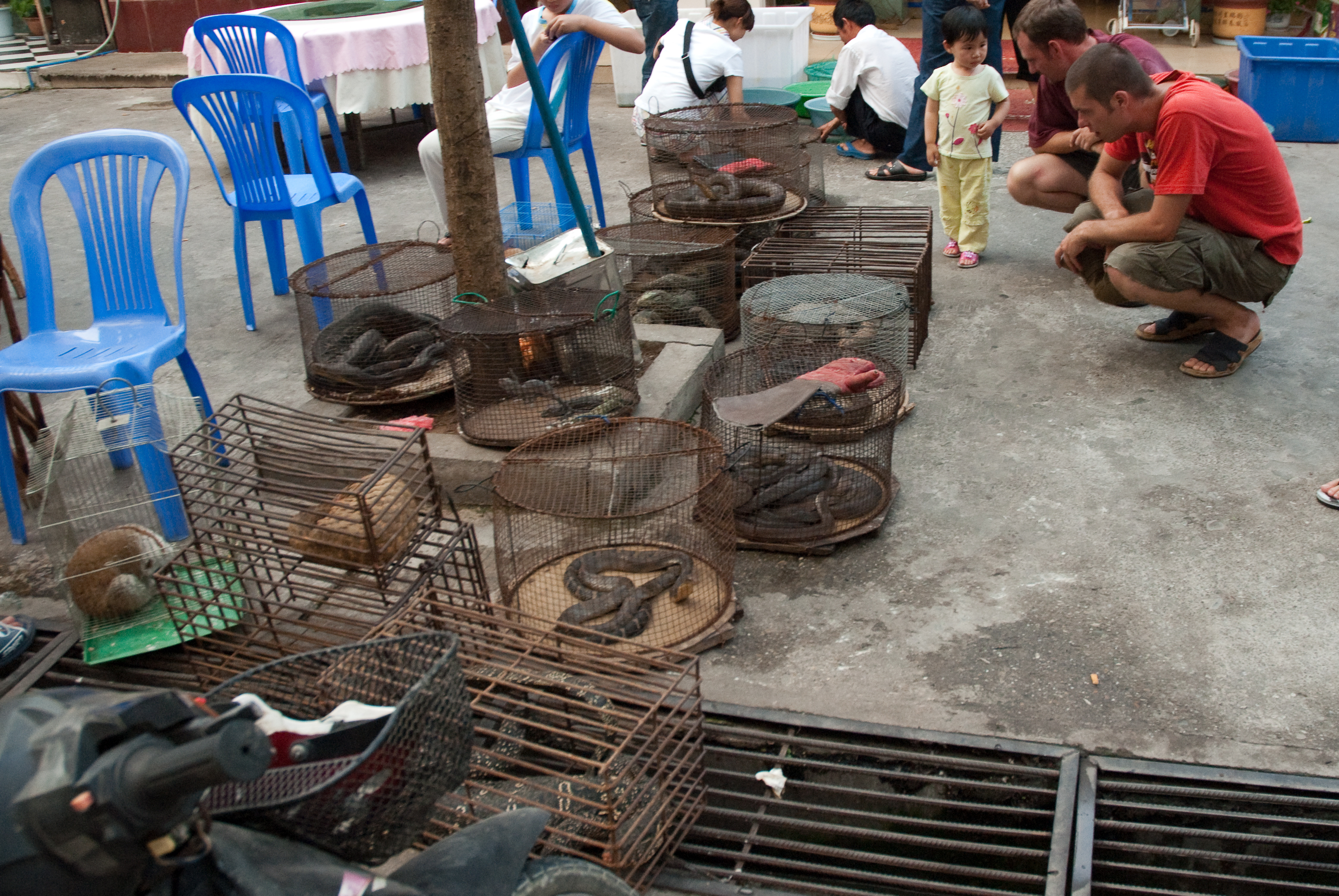
Slow lorises and other exotic wildlife are sold domestically each year in open-air animal markets, such as this one in Myanmar.

Demand from middlemen and specialized animal trade mafias has increased the profitability of slow loris hunting and driven many hunters to catch any they spot by climbing or shaking trees. In the Mondulkiri Province in Cambodia, slow lorises are shaken out of trees and then bludgeoned to death with a stick. In Indonesia, slow lorises are worth more alive, so hunters climb the tree to reach them and place a V-shaped stick around their neck to immobilize them. If the slow loris is found in with an infant, the parent is often killed.

Middlemen buy as many as 30 slow lorises from rural hunters over a wide area, and then sell them in the major city markets for 300,000 to 500,000 rupiahs (US$32 to US$54) each. Western tourists and expatriates pay as much as 1,000,000 rupiahs (US$108). Traders have reported to researchers that they have difficulty keeping pace with demand, and one trader claimed to have sold nearly 1,200 pygmy slow lorises during 2001–2002. Hundreds of slow lorises are sold domestically each year in Indonesian at open-air animal markets (or "bird markets"), as well as in shopping malls. Slow lorises are the most commonly sold protected primate at these markets. Live trade is the most common, with only 13.6% of slow lorises traded for parts. In Phnom Penh, Cambodia during the 1990s, observers counted up to 204 slow lorises for sale at a single store; in 2007 a market in Mondulkiri Province displayed 30 dried specimens. A total of 234 slow lorises were confiscated by the Forestry Administration-Wildlife Alliance between 2002 and 2006. In Indonesia, nearly 6,000 to 7,000 slow lorises were traded domestically each year from 2000 to 2006. For international trade, Laos, Cambodia, and Thailand were the biggest exporters, with exports having declined for all species except the pygmy slow loris from 1998 to 2007 (compared to 1978–1997).

=== Traditional medicine ===
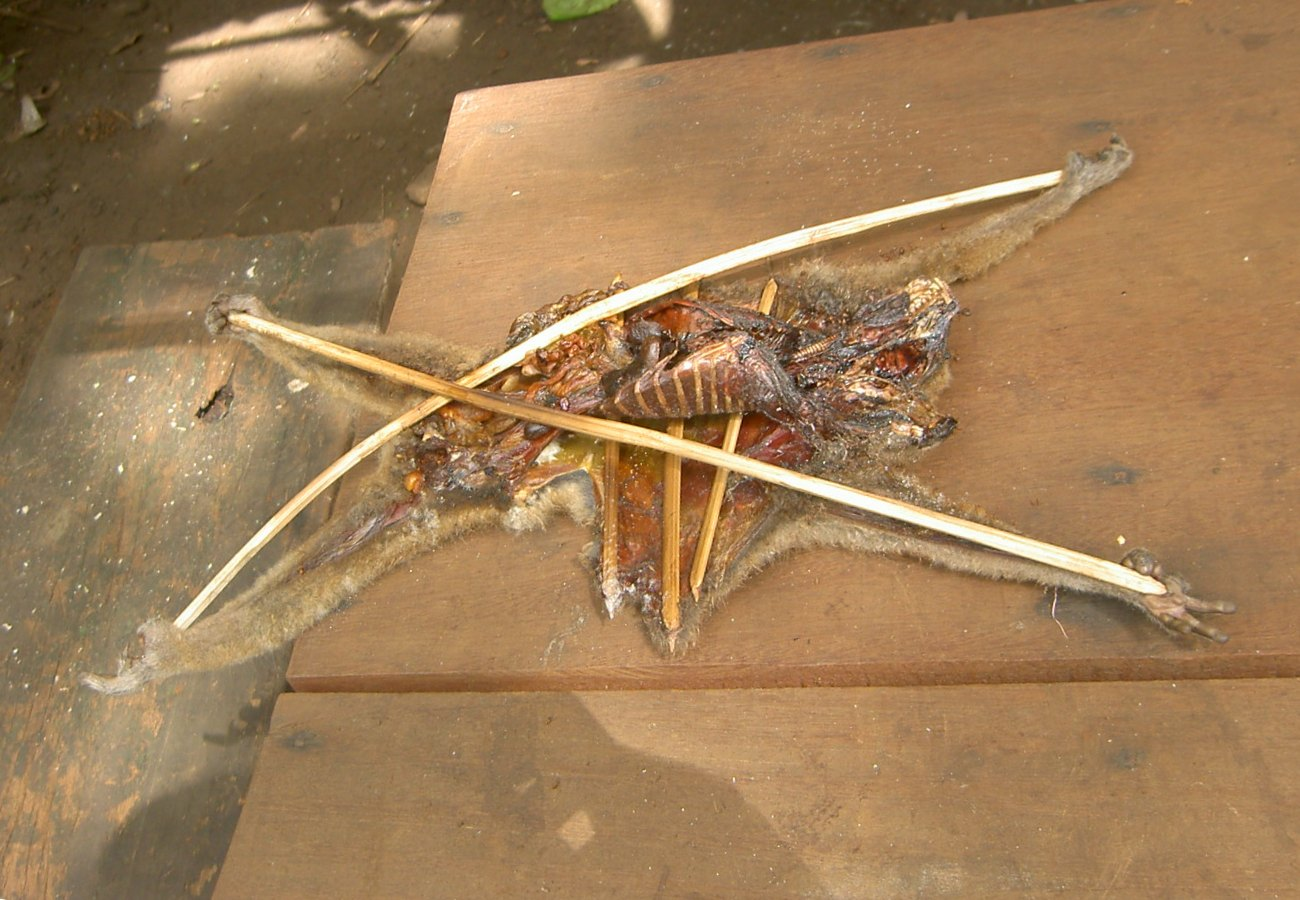
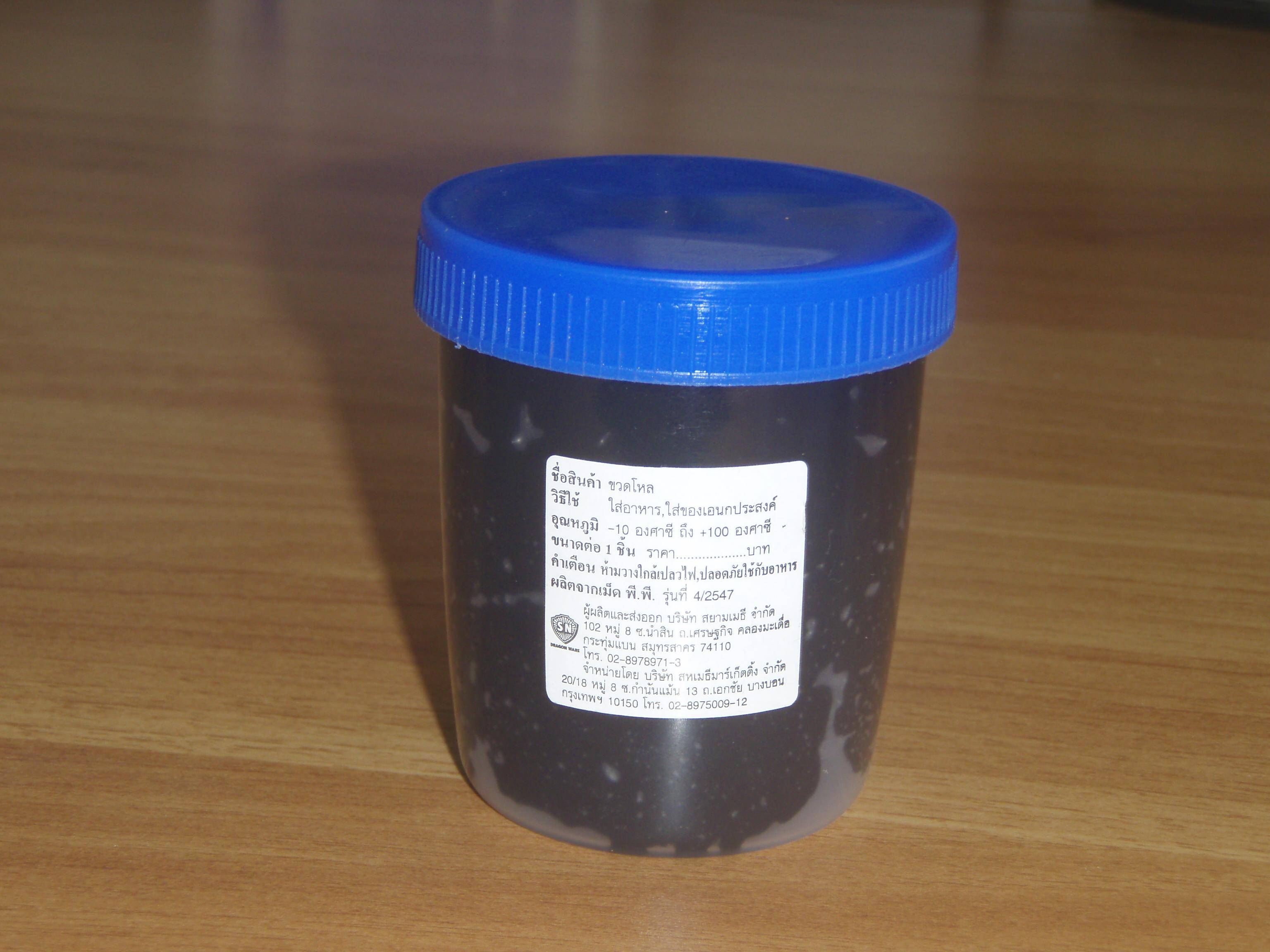
Slow lorises are commonly dried and sold (top), and then later prepared for specific uses, such as loris ointment (bottom).

Slow lorises are commonly used in traditional medicine across their geographic range, a practice that has been reported since at least 1900. Thousands of slow lorises are captured each year for such use. Many human factors drive the trade in slow loris parts, including social customs, economic factors, and traditional belief systems.

In Cambodia, the deeply rooted tradition of using the Bengal and pygmy slow lorises in traditional medicine is widespread, and the pygmy slow loris is the most commonly requested animal in traditional medicine shops in Cambodia's capital, Phnom Penh. Some people in the country believe dried slow loris can cure cancer. Slow lorises are also smoked for other traditional remedies. Traditional Khmer medicine practitioners in that region claim that medicines made from slow lorises can cure 100 diseases, with some practitioners from the National Centre for Traditional Medicine reporting that slow loris are sometimes roasted alive under the assumption that this increases the medicine's potency. Slow lorises are also burned alive, causing their eyes to burst and release a liquid called minyak kukang (or loris oil), which is used in black magic and traditional medicine and is supposed to have life-giving qualities and act as a love potion.

In the case of the Bengal slow loris, every part—including the brain, urine, and skin—is used in traditional medicine in order to heal wounds and rheumatism. With the Sunda slow loris, people trade the skin, feet, skeletons, and skulls. The fur is reported to heal wounds, the flesh to cure epilepsy, eyes are used in love potions, and the meat is reported to cure asthma and stomach problems. The pygmy slow loris is primarily valued for the medicinal use of its hair, but it is also used to make bone glue of monkey, a medicine used mostly by local people, but sometimes sold to visitors. In general, wearing slow loris bones is considered good luck and the meat is sometimes thought to cure leprosy.

The main buyers of medicine made from slow lorises are middle- to upper-class women between the ages of 25 and 45 who primarily use loris rice wine tonic to alleviate the pain of childbirth. One bottle of wine is made by mixing rice wine with the carcasses of three dead animals. Minority groups in Cambodia also use loris-based medicine for treating broken bones, asthma, and sexually transmitted diseases. A survey by primatologist Anna Nekaris et al. (2010) showed that these belief systems were so strong that the majority of respondents expressed reluctance to consider alternatives to loris-based medicines.

In 1993, 200 dead slow lorises were found cut open and stretched out on sticks in the markets of Phnom Penh. In another shop, 150 dead slow lorises were found in two boxes. This suggests hunting on a commercial scale, which has had dramatic effects on local populations. At the time, these dried slow lorises were sold for US$4.25. However, the prices doubled between 1997 and 2007 and continue to rise. Most vendors (80%) surveyed in 2010 attributed the price increases to a decline in loris numbers and increased enforcement.

=== Pet trade ===
Slow lorises are sold locally at street markets, but are also sold internationally over the Internet and in pet stores. They are especially popular or trendy in Japan, particularly among women. The reasons for their popularity, according to the Japan Wildlife Conservation Society (JWCS), are that "they're easy to keep, they don't cry, they're small, and just very cute." Along with the common squirrel monkey (Saimiri sciureus), slow lorises are the most popular primate pets in Japan. Pet shops frequently advertise them, even on their websites, with prices ranging between US$1,500 and more than US$5,000, or ¥450,000. Despite these frequent advertisements, the World Conservation Monitoring Centre (WCMC) reported only a few dozen slow lorises were imported in 2006, suggesting frequent smuggling. Slow lorises are also smuggled to China, Taiwan, Europe, and Saudi Arabia for use as pets. Smuggling and trade in Poland and Russia are also common according to Nekaris.

Because of their "cuteness", viral videos of pet slow lorises are some of the mostly frequently watched animal videos on YouTube. In March 2011, a newly posted video of a slow loris holding a cocktail umbrella had been viewed more than two million times, while an older video of a slow loris being tickled had been viewed more than six million times. At the time, most viewers did not realize that the slow loris pet trade is illegal or that the docile behavior of the animals in the videos is a passive defensive reaction for dealing with stress. For instance, according to Nekaris, the slow loris with the umbrella—who was suffering from a head wound—was disoriented in the video by the bright lights and was grasping the umbrella like it would a piece of bamboo from its native habitat. Nekaris requested that YouTube remove the videos, but the UK-based newspaper, The Independent, reported that YouTube declined to comment on the slow loris videos. While YouTube currently has means for viewers to flag videos involving animal cruelty, pornography, and illegal weapons or drugs, it has no means for flagging videos involving illegally trafficked animals. The 'tickling slow loris' video was eventually removed in February 2012, after having received over 9 million views and generating over 12 thousand comments (although copies of it were later reposted). During the lifetime of the video two significant slow loris conservation-associated events occurred, the March 2011 posting of the English Wikipedia article on the subject and the January 2012 airing of a BBC television production entitled Jungle Gremlins of Java; both events were associated with a spike in viewership of the video, and were often mentioned in the comments made during those periods (3.2% and 13.3%, respectively). Celebrity endorsements stimulated viewing of the video without providing any increase in conservation awareness. Over time, the proportion of comments indicating a desire to have a slow loris as a pet remained high but trended downward, while the proportion of comments indicating awareness of slow loris's legal and conservation status increased after the conservation-related events but did not follow a long term trend. The removal of the video followed shortly after the airing of the BBC documentary, which dramatized the exploitation of slow lorises for the pet trade. In 2015 Nekaris published that slow lorises were also used as a promotional photo-ops in bars and beaches frequented by tourists. This new use for the illegally acquired animal stems from the newfound popularity that emerged from the widely shared YouTube videos and television programs.

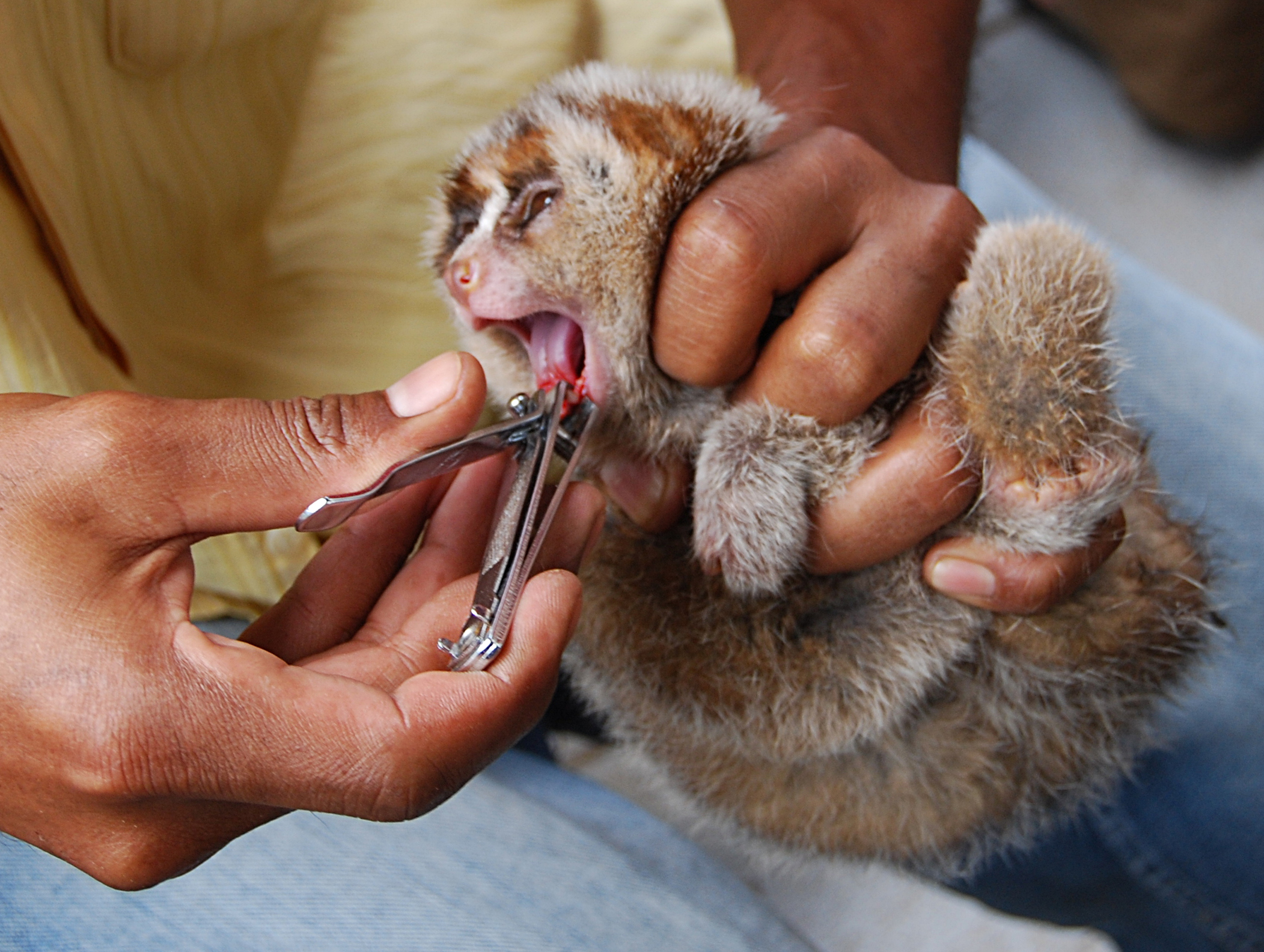
Slow lorises have their front teeth cut or pulled before being sold as pets, a practice that often results in infection and death.

Within their countries of origin, slow lorises are very popular exotic pets. Indonesian species are mostly sold as pets, despite myths about their magical and curative properties. They are seen as a "living toy" for children by local people or are bought out of pity (to save the animals) by Western tourists or expatriates. Neither local nor foreign buyers usually know anything about these primates, their endangered status, or that the trade is illegal. During the late 2000s, Sunda slow lorises were regularly sold throughout the Medan bird market in North Sumatra. According to 59 monthly surveys and interviews with local traders, nearly a thousand locally sourced slow lorises exchanged hands in the market. During the surveys, between 15 and 45 slow lorises were seen around the market.

International trade usually results in a high mortality rate during transit, between 30% and 90%. Slow lorises also experience many health problems as a result of both local and international trade. To give the impression that the primates are tame and appropriate pets for children, to protect people from their potentially toxic bite, or to deceive buyers into thinking the animal is a baby, animal dealers either pull the front teeth with pliers or wire cutters or they cut them off with nail cutters. This results in severe bleeding, which sometimes causes shock or death, and frequently leads to dental infection, which is fatal in 90% of all cases. Without their teeth, the animals are no longer able to fend for themselves in the wild, and must remain in captivity for life. The slow lorises found in animal markets are usually underweight and malnourished, and have had their fur dyed, which complicates species identification at rescue centers. As many as 95% of the slow lorises rescued from the markets die of dental infection or improper care.

As part of the trade, infants are pulled prematurely from their parents, leaving them unable to remove their own urine, feces, and oily skin secretions from their fur. Slow lorises have a special network of blood vessels in their hands and feet, which makes them vulnerable to cuts when pulled from the wire cages they are kept in. Slow lorises are also very stress-sensitive and do not do well in captivity. Infection, stress, pneumonia, and poor nutrition lead to high death rates among pet lorises. The diets of wild slow lorises are poorly understood. Signs of an inappropriate diet in captivity include tooth decay, diabetes, obesity, and kidney failure. Pet owners also fail to provide proper care because they are often sleeping when the nocturnal pet is normally awake.

=== International trade and smuggling ===
Even the best breeding facilities have great difficulty breeding lorises, and those that do often have difficulty keeping them alive. It is so easy to get access to wild-caught lorises, it is highly doubtful that a seller who claims to have captive-bred ones is telling the truth.

— Primatologist Anna Nekaris, in 2009 discussing the misleading information posted on YouTube.

One of the first cases of slow loris smuggling was documented by the International Primate Protection League (IPPL) in November 1974. The California Department of Fish and Game in San Francisco found 15 slow lorises in a bag labeled "spitting cobras" in a shipment from Thailand that also contained snakes, tortoises, and otters. Because of mistakes and inconsistencies in the order, it was unclear whether the receiving wildlife company was a target of a hoax or whether it had attempted to conceal the shipment.

Since the late 1990s, both high demand and resulting high prices have fueled increased smuggling of slow lorises to Japan. Although pet shop employees declare that their slow lorises are captive-bred, the advertisements on the pet store websites indicate that their stocks come from Java, Sumatra, or China. New arrivals to the stores are also variable in size and age, which has further led the JWCS to suspect the slow lorises are imported illegally. Official, legal trade of slow lorises prior to CITES Appendix I coverage (from 1998 to 2006) was limited to just ten Sunda slow lorises from Malaysia and Myanmar. A review of 24 surveys covering wildlife trade between 1990 and 2006 demonstrated 228 slow lorises were known to have been traded unofficially each year and had come from Cambodia, Indonesia, Vietnam, and Laos. The major trade hubs were Jakarta, Medan, Singapore and Bangkok. Numerous illegal trade routes for each species were also documented prior to the 2007 CITES vote over Appendix I coverage in the Notification to Parties publication.

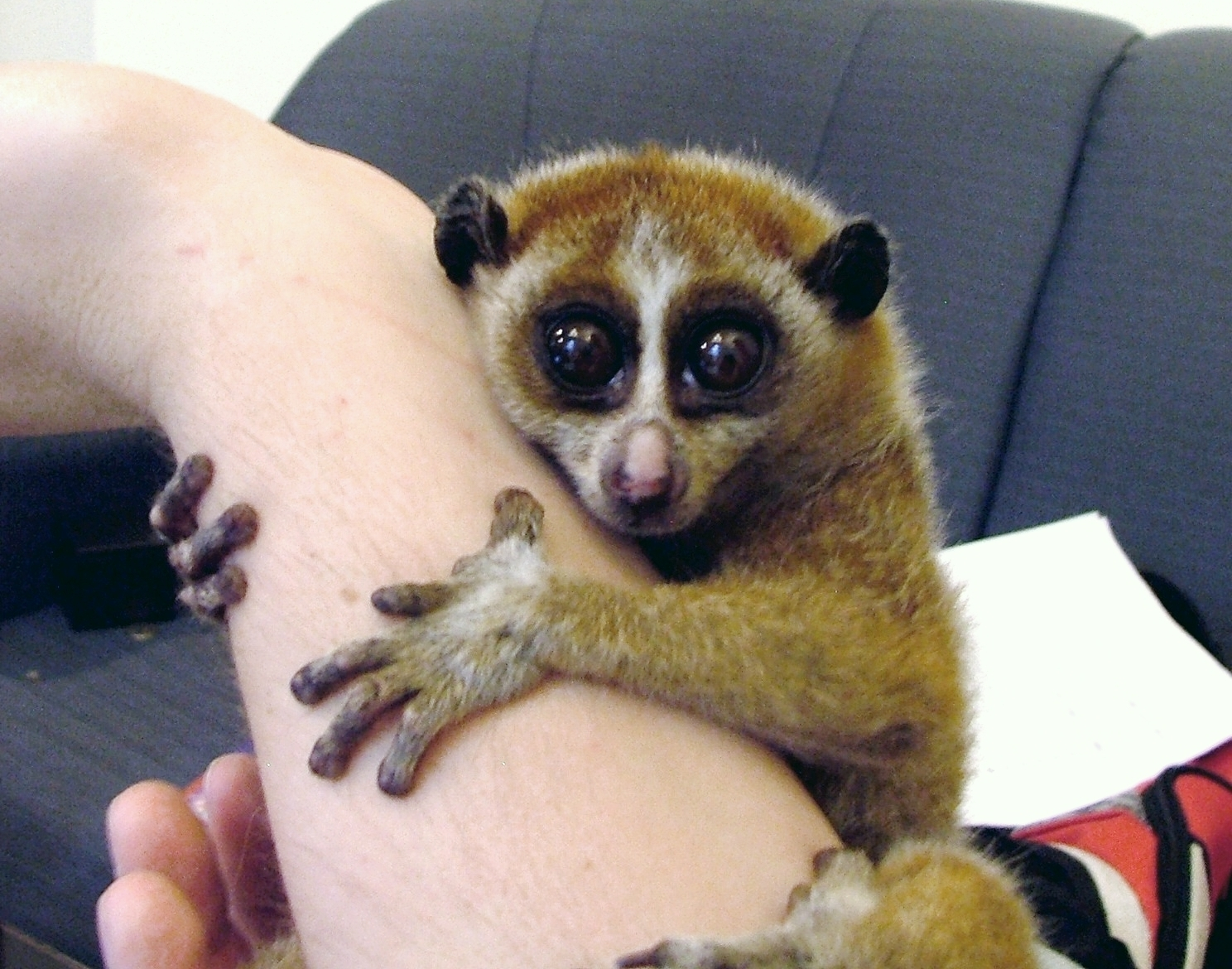
Slow lorises are smuggled to countries like Japan and the United States, where they have become popular exotic pets, largely because of their "cute" appearance, which has been popularized on YouTube.

A report in 2010 by Nekaris et al. reported that Laos, Cambodia, and Thailand were the primary exporters of slow lorises, with Singapore and Malaysia also involved. China and Indonesia were also known for international trade, although their local trade was more significant. Slow loris parts were typically exported from Thailand and Cambodia, but Malaysia and Singapore primarily exported live animals. The most noteworthy importer was Japan, followed by the United States and then the European Union. More than half of 400 illegal imports were live animals (238), while the rest were either body parts (122) or unspecified (40).

In Japan alone, 39 confiscations including 363 live animals were made between 1998 and 2006, with 2006 being the peak year. During the same time period, Thai, Indonesian, and Singaporean officials discovered 358 lorises destined for Japan. Details of several confiscations from smuggling attempts between Thailand and Japan have been reported by the IPPL, including one event on 2 May 2007, where 40 slow lorises were confiscated at Narita Airport only a month before the CITES conference that elevated the slow loris status to Appendix I. Twelve of those animals died. The deaths are not unusual, with a mortality rate of 76% for all species of confiscated slow lorises, many dying before they are transferred to zoos. The JWCS suspects that the high mortality rate among smuggled slow lorises causes traders to smuggle more slow lorises than are needed to supply the market.

In Japan, enforcement is not considered very strict since only 23% of smugglers (9 out of 39 cases) were officially charged between 1998 and 2006. Instead, most only received fines. Based on reports taken from Kyodo News, the JWCS concluded that the primary concern of Customs officials was the prevention of infectious diseases, such as Ebola. Slow lorises are sometimes mixed in with other trade-restricted species, such as reptiles, and since confiscations target high-profile species, it is likely that the international smuggling numbers are "just the tip of the iceberg." Making detection even more difficult, slow lorises can easily be hidden in suitcases since they tend to instinctively curl up and remain quiet when startled.

== Conservation efforts ==
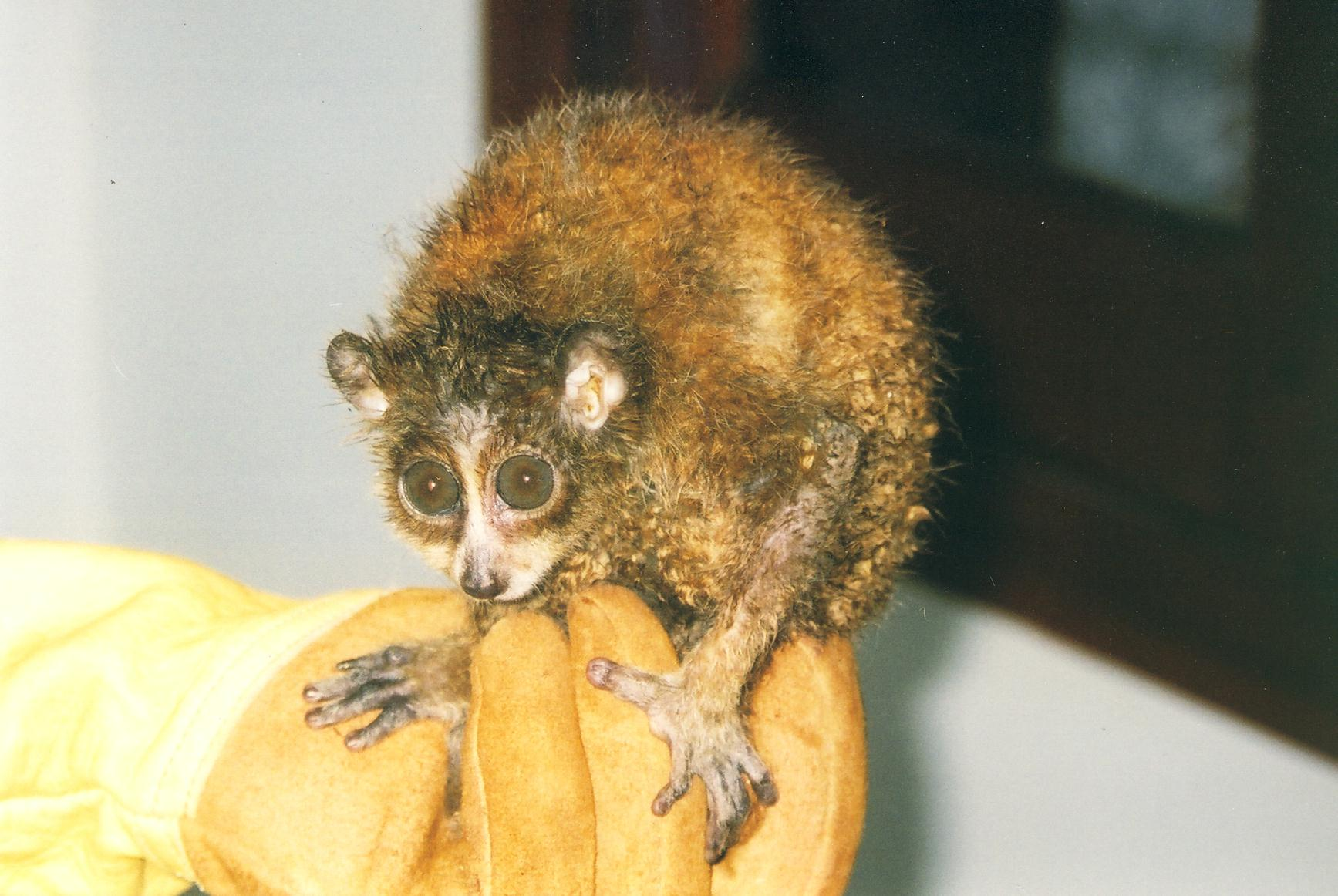
Most slow lorises rescued from animal markets die quickly from infection, stress, or from previous neglect.

Surveys are needed to determine existing population densities and habitat viability for all species of slow loris. Connectivity between protected areas is important for slow lorises because they are not adapted to dispersing across the ground over large distances. For successful reintroductions, connectivity between sites with low population density is considered ideal. Protected area extensions are also needed in Borneo, Java, and Sumatra.

Despite being included in CITES Appendix I protection and covered by local conservation laws, slow lorises are still threatened by both local and international trade because of problems with enforcement. The continued illegal trade in wildlife has seriously jeopardized both the success and the future of a US$310 million investment program by the World Bank for East and Southeast Asia biodiversity. In 2008, training workshops for enforcement officials and rescue center personnel were held in Singapore to help teach slow loris identification, conservation status, and husbandry. Surveys prior to the training showed 87% of the trainees could not identify slow loris species, but the one-day workshops had a significant impact.

Rehabilitation is available to some confiscated slow lorises. Organizations such as the International Animal Rescue (IAR) run sanctuaries that offer lifelong care to slow lorises that have had their teeth removed, while also providing education and awareness programs to local people to help end domestic trade. By collaborating with authorities, healthy slow lorises are released back into the wild. However, identification is critical because authorities still manage all slow lorises as if they were from one species, resulting in species being released into the wrong locations and increasing confusion in taxonomy and conservation.

Populations of slow loris species, such as the Bengal and Sunda slow loris, are not faring well in zoos. In 2011, the International Species Information System (ISIS) had only 11 and 53 specimens (respectively) on file from reporting zoos worldwide. In North American zoos, for instance, several of the 29 captive specimens in 2008 were hybrids that could not breed while most were past their reproductive years, and the last captive birth was in 2001 at the San Diego Zoo. Only three Javan slow lorises were kept in zoos in 2011 according to ISIS. Pygmy slow lorises are doing better, with 100 specimens reported from zoos worldwide in 2011. In North American zoos, for instance, the population has grown to 74 animals between the time they were imported in the late 1980s and 2008, with most of them born at the San Diego Zoo.

The San Diego Zoo has also written husbandry manuals for slow lorises, promoted public awareness, conducted field surveys, and supported slow loris rescue facilities. The Vietnamese postal service recognized slow lorises on a postage stamp by using a picture of a Bengal slow loris and her infant published by the San Diego Zoo in February 1999.

== See also ==
- Environmental issues in Indonesia
