= Bou Sra Waterfall =

- ទឹកជ្រោះប៊ូស្រា
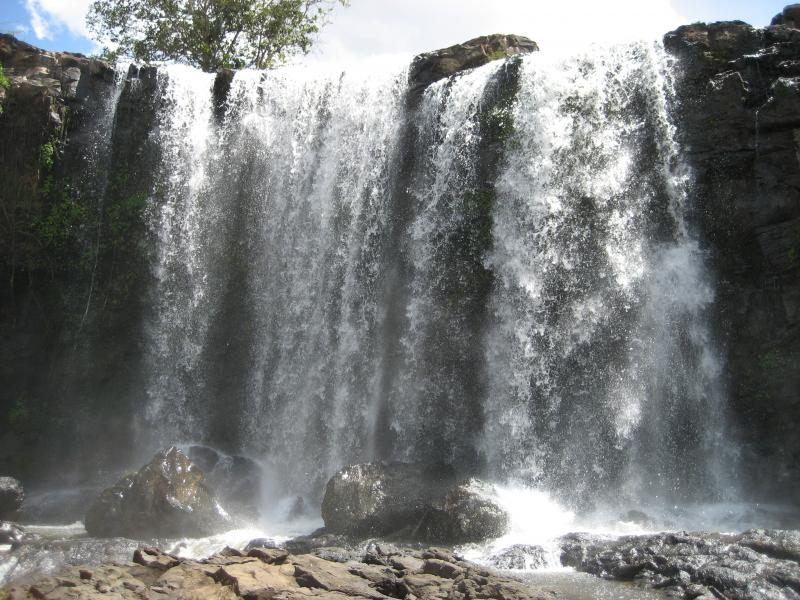
- Bou Sra Waterfall, Mondulkiri Province, Cambodia
- Interactive map of Bou Sra Waterfall
- Location: Mondulkiri Province, Cambodia
- Coordinates: 12.5665°N 107.4189°E
- Type: Plunges
- Number of drops: 3

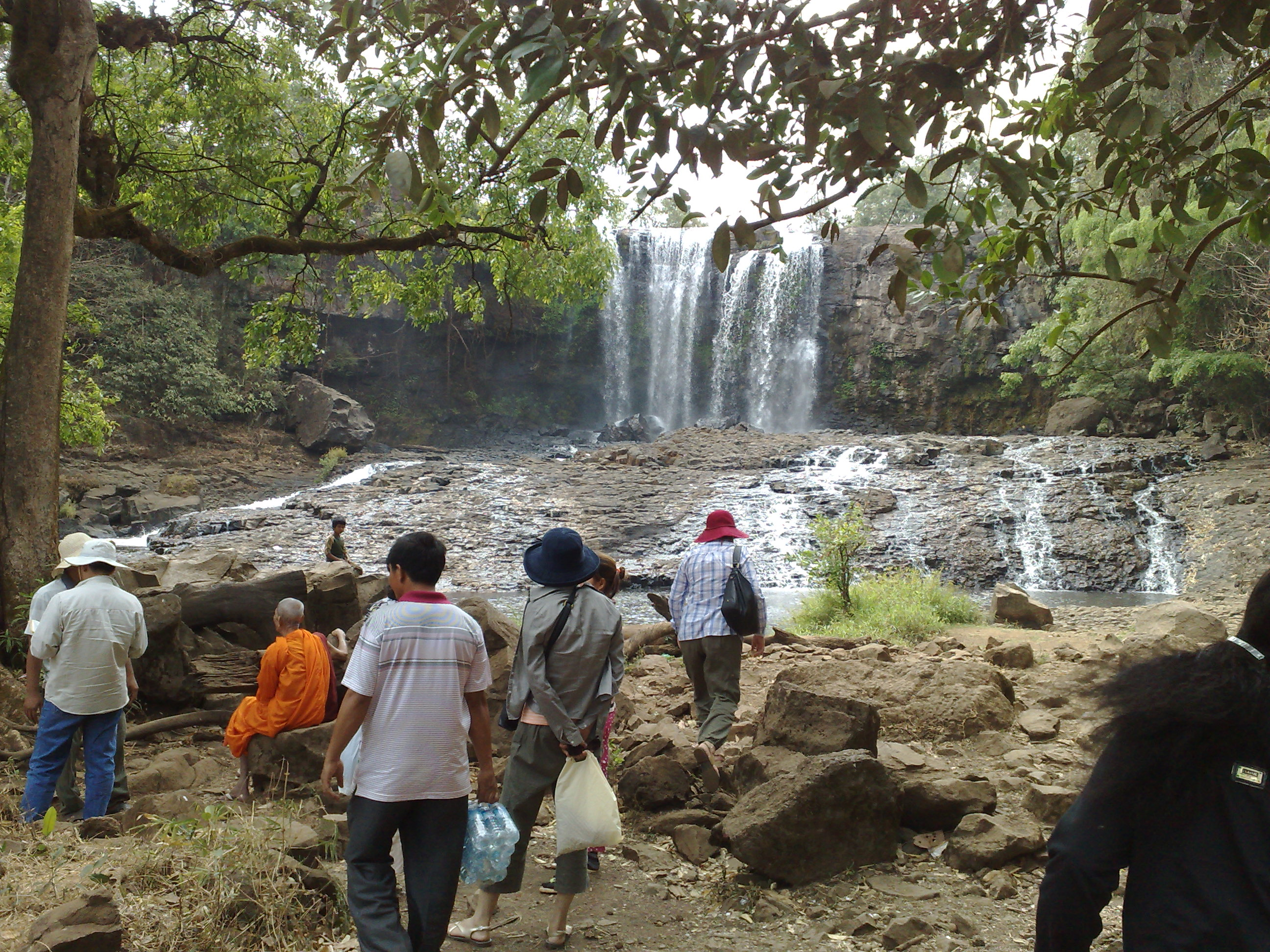
Tourists at Bou Sra Waterfall

Bou Sra Waterfall, also referred to as Bousra, Bu Sra, Busra or Boo Sra Waterfall (Khmer: ទឹកជ្រោះប៊ូស្រា), is a scenic waterfall now located in Bousra Eco Park, Pech Chreada District, Mondulkiri Province, Cambodia, about 43 kilometers from the provincial town of Sen Monorom and just 15 kilometers from the Vietnamese border. Considered one of Cambodia's most famous tourist attractions, Bou Sra is popular due to its triple-tier drop. Previously, Bou Sra could only be viewed on ground level. However, with recent additions of platforms, guests can now see the waterfall from higher elevations for a better view.

== Failed Eco-Tourism Development ==
The Sar Lar Investment company had spent US$2 million of the total projected US$6 million project budget to clear forests and construct a road to develop the Bou Sra Waterfall Eco Resort, but then pulled out of the project because of "capital concerns." The project was undertaken due to worries the waterfall, which is popular with tourists, is underdeveloped.
