= Geographical Indications in Cambodia =

Geographical Indications in Cambodia are a form of intellectual property consisting of an "which is a name or represents a geographical origin and identifies the goods as originating in such geographical area where a given quality, reputation or other characteristic of the goods is essentially attributable to its geographical origin;". Geographical indications can be registered based on the Law on Geographical Indications Registration is open for agricultural goods and foodstuffs, but also for handicraft goods

Foreign geographical indications can only be registered if they are recognised or registered there. As of August 2021, 6 Indications have been registered.

== Registered Geographical Indications ==
As of August 2021, 6 Geographical Indications had been registered, 3 of which originate from Cambodia. The list of Cambodian GIs is shown below:

Country of origin	GI Name	Registration date	Geographical origin
Cambodia	Kampot pepper	2 April 2010	Domestic
Cambodia	Kampong Speu palm sugar	2 April 2010	Domestic
Cambodia	Koh Trung pomelo	15 June 2018	Domestic
France	Champagne	29 April 2019	Foreign
United Kingdom	Scotch whisky	25 October 2019	Foreign
Cambodia	Mondulkiri wild honey	10 December 2020	Domestic

== Protection outside Cambodia ==
=== European Union ===
Kampot pepper is (in addition to its status as a Geographical Indication in Cambodia) also register as a Protected Geographical Indication in the European Union as well as the UK under the names "ម្រេចកំពត' (Mrech Kampot)/'Poivre de Kampot". Kampong Speu palm sugar is also registered in the EU and UK (as ស្ករត្នោតកំពង់ស្ពឺ, Skor Thnot Kampong Speu).

=== Thailand and Vietnam ===
Kampot pepper and Kampong Speu palm sugar are also protected in Thailand and Vietnam.

=== Lisbon Agreement ===
Cambodia is a party to the Geneva Act to the Lisbon Agreement from the moment of its entry into force in 2021. Kampot pepper became the first GI to be protected under the Geneva act. As of 10 September 2021, the registration was renounced in 1 party (Samoa), while from the other countries (Oman, North Korea, Laos, France, the European Union and Albania) no registration or renunciation had been reported.
