= William Albracht =

American military personnel

William "Bill" Albracht is an American author and former US Army captain in the Vietnam War. He is a recipient of three Silver Stars, and is the author of Abandoned in Hell: The Fight for Vietnam's Firebase Kate.

== Early life ==
William Albracht was born and raised in Rock Island, Illinois. In 1966, he graduated from Alleman High School.

== Career ==
=== Military ===
At 21 years old, Albracht was the youngest Green Beret captain in Vietnam. In October 1969 Albracht took command of a remote hilltop outpost called Firebase Kate in the Quang Doc Province of South Vietnam, held by 27 American soldiers and 156 Montagnard militiamen. At dawn the next morning, three North Vietnamese Army regiments crossed the Cambodian border and attacked. Albracht's men held off repeated ground assaults by the Communist forces. After five days Kate's defenders were out of ammunition and water. Albracht led his troops off the hill and on a night march through enemy lines, a feat never duplicated during the Vietnam War. He saved 150 lives during the evacuation of the battle site Firebase Kate.

Albracht was awarded three Silver Stars for his actions in the Vietnam War. He has also received three Purple Hearts and five Bronze Stars.

=== After the war ===
For 25 years, Albracht served as a United States Secret Service agent. During his time with the Secret Service, he guarded five American presidents and numerous foreign officials. After his retirement, he managed executive security operations for the Ford Motor Company.

In 2005, Albracht returned to his hometown. He served on the board of the Quad Cities chapter of Vietnam Veterans of America for five years, and was its president for two terms.

In the 2012 election for the Illinois State Senate in the 36th district, Albracht made an unsuccessful bid for political office as a Republican against Senator Mike Jacobs.

== Writings ==
Along with Captain Marvin J. Wolf, Albracht wrote the book Abandoned in Hell: The Fight for Vietnam's Firebase Kate. It recounts Albracht's leadership in Vietnam, specifically his heroic actions on a remote hilltop outpost called Firebase Kate. The reception for Abandoned In Hell: The Fight For Firebase Kate has generally been positive. The Washington Independent Review of Books wrote, "With a foreword by Joseph L. Galloway (co-author of We Were Soldiers Once) and excellent illustrations and photos, Abandoned in Hell: The Fight for Vietnam's Firebase Kate is a story that deserved to be well told." Major General Paul Vallely, two-tour Vietnam veteran, Fox News senior military analyst, and author of Endgame: The Blueprint for Victory in the War on Terror, wrote, "This gripping, gritty and cinematic blow-by-blow account of outnumbered Americans locked in a desperate battle with the North Vietnamese Army is destined to become a classic of its genre. If you read only one book about Vietnam this year, this must be the one."

== In film ==
Albracht's story is included in the documentary Escape from Firebase Kate, which was produced by filmmaker Paul Kakert.
