= Phnom Doh Kromom =

Hills in Mondulkiri province, Cambodia

- Yok Sros Phlom, Chihov Mountain and Chihor Mountain, ភ្នំដោះក្រមុំ, Phnom Dohkromom, Phnom Doh Kramom, Doh Kramom Mountain

Highest point
- Elevation: 800 m (2,600 ft)
- Coordinates: 12.480520°N 107.181440°E

Phnom Doh Kromom (ភ្នំដោះក្រមុំ) is a pair of hills located in Sokh Dom (សង្កាត់សុខដុម), Senmonorom municipality. It is an important spiritual site for indigenous groups, especially Bunong people.

== Background ==
Legend holds that the original names for the two hills were Chihov Mountain and Chihor Mountain, named for two spirits who governed the sites. A young woman, Phlom, who was betrothed to a young man, Sros, disappeared whilst collecting water. Devastated, Sros searched for her, eventually being reunited in the area of the two hills. Two community elders decreed that the hills should be renamed Yok Sros Phlom in their honor ('yok' meaning 'mountain' in Bunong).

In the 1950s, a visiting Royal Government officer, ignoring the existing name and history, gave the name Phnom Doh Kromom (Maiden's Breasts Mountain) because of the form of the two hills. In English signs and documentation, the name is modestly changed to Grandmother and Grandfather Mountains.

The southern hill has a viewing platform which looks out across Sen Monorom town. Both hills have Buddhist shrines at the peak.
