= Phnom Nam Lyr Wildlife Sanctuary =

Protected area in eastern Cambodia

- Khmer: ដែនជម្រកសត្វព្រៃភ្នំណាមលៀរ
- IUCN category IV (habitat/species management area)
- Location within Cambodia
- Location: Mondulkiri, Cambodia
- Nearest city: Sen Monorom
- Coordinates: 12°28′13″N 107°30′02″E
- Area: 509.57 km^{2} (196.75 sq mi)
- Established: 1993
- Governing body: Ministry of Environment

Phnom Nam Lyr Wildlife Sanctuary (Khmer: ដែនជម្រកសត្វព្រៃភ្នំណាមលៀរ) is a protected area in Cambodia's Mondulkiri Province that was established in 1993. It covers an area of 509.57 km^{2} (196.75 sq mi) with elevations ranging from 320 to 1,070 m (1,050 to 3,510 ft). It is located close to the international border with Vietnam. It includes Phnom Nam Lyr within its borders and is threatened by illegal logging.
