= Bu Prang Camp =

U.S. military camp in Quang Duc, Vietnam

Bu Prang Camp
- Tuy Đức district, Quang Duc Province in Vietnam
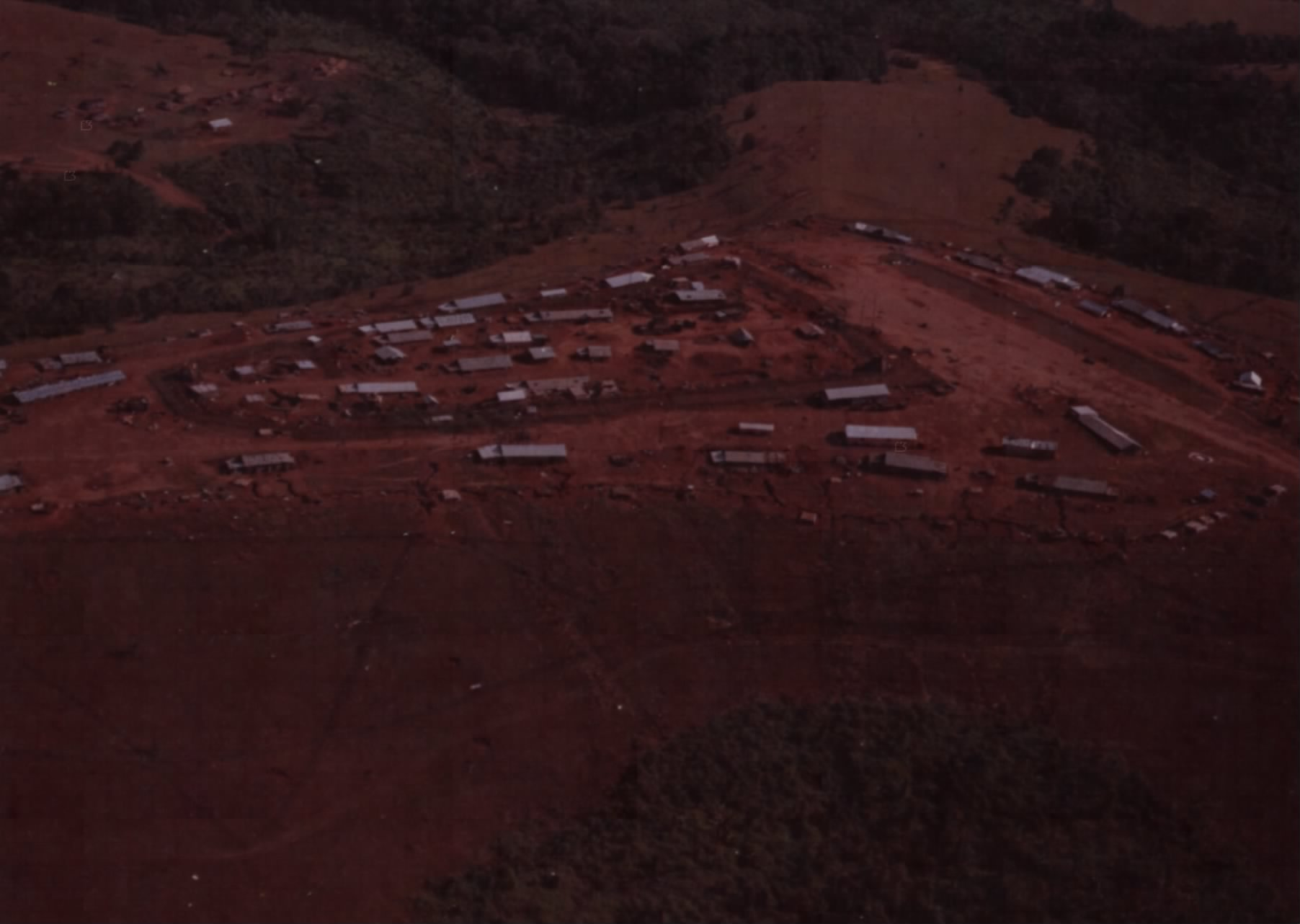
- Bu Prang, 21 November 1969

Site information
- Type: Army Base
- Operator: Army of the Republic of Vietnam (ARVN); United States Army (U.S. Army)
- Condition: Abandoned

Location
- Shown within Vietnam
- Coordinates: 12.238°N 107.316°E

Site history
- Built: 1967
- In use: October 1967-1970
- Battles/wars: Vietnam War

Garrison information
- Garrison: 5th Special Forces Group

Bu Prang Camp (also known as Bu Prang Special Forces Camp) is a former U.S. Army and Army of the Republic of Vietnam (ARVN) base in Quang Duc Province 5km from the Vietnam-Cambodia border.

== History ==
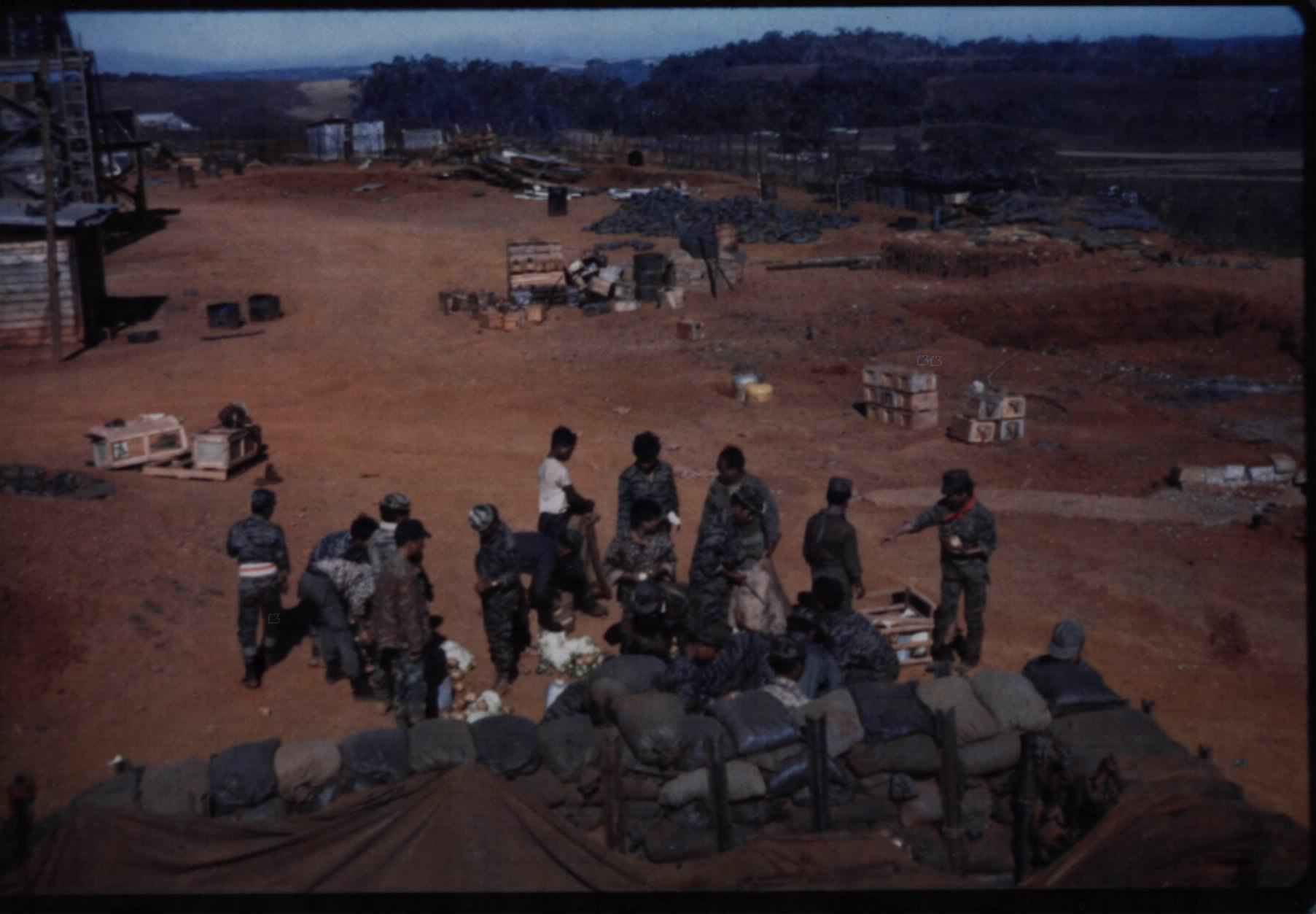
CIDG Forces at Bu Prang, 23 January 1970

The base was located on Route 14, in Tuy Đức district 5 km south of the Cambodian border. The base was established by the Special Forces II CTZ MIKE Force who secured the site in a parachute assault on 5 October 1967. Once the area was secured, Detachment A-236, 5th Special Forces and CIDG forces were brought in by helicopter to establish the base.

On 28 October 1969 the People's Army of Vietnam (PAVN) 3rd Division began a siege of the Camp, Landing Zone Kate and Duc Lap Camp. On 1 November when Kate was abandoned the forces evacuated towards Bu Prang. On 18 November 1969 PAVN mortar fire destroyed the Camp's ammunition storage bunker. The siege was broken by the ARVN on 16 December 1969.

The base was relocated further east in early 1970 to put it out of range of PAVN artillery fire coming from Cambodia.

== Current use ==
The base has been turned over to farmland.
