= Sre Pok Wildlife Sanctuary =

Protected area in eastern Cambodia

- Mondulkiri Protected Forest
- IUCN category IV (habitat/species management area)
- Location within Cambodia
- Location: Mondulkiri, Cambodia
- Nearest city: Senmonorom
- Coordinates: 12°56′10″N 107°18′18″E
- Area: 372,971 ha (1,440.05 sq mi)
- Established: May 9, 2016
- Governing body: Ministry of Environment

Sre Pok Wildlife Sanctuary (Khmer: ដែនជម្រកសត្វព្រៃស្រែពក, formerly Mondulkiri Protected Forest) is a 372,971 ha (1,440.05 sq mi) large wildlife sanctuary in Mondulkiri Province, eastern Cambodia established on May 9, 2016, according to Sub-decree No. 85 ANKr.BK.

Formerly, classified as Mondulkiri Protected Forest (Khmer: តំបន់ព្រៃការពារសម្រាប់អភិរក្សធនធានសេនេទិច រុក្ខជាតិ និង សត្វព្រៃ «មណ្ឌលគិរី»), established on July 30, 2002, according to Sub-decree no. 75 ANKr.BK, originally with 429,438 ha (1,658.07 sq mi), but was downsized 56,467 ha (218.02 sq mi) in 2007. It borders Lomphat Wildlife Sanctuary in the northwest, O'Yadav National Park in the north, Phnom Prich Wildlife Sanctuary in the southwest and Phnom Nam Lyr Wildlife Sanctuary in the southeast.

It is part of the largest protected area complex in Southeast Asia.

== External ==
- Tigers, Elephants Returning to War-Torn Cambodia Forest by National Geographic
- Mondulkiri Protected Forest and Phnom Prich Wildlife Sanctuary by IAPAD
- Map of Protected areas system in Cambodia
