= Landing Zone Kate =

US Army base from the Vietnam War

Site information
- Type: Army

Location
- Coordinates: 12.238°N 107.363°E

Site history
- Built: 1969
- In use: 1969
- Battles/wars: Vietnam War

Garrison information
- Occupants: 5th Special Forces

Landing Zone Kate (also known as Firebase Kate, LZ Kate or Firebase White) is a former U.S. Army base northwest of Quang Duc Province in southern Vietnam near the Cambodian border.

== History ==
The base was defended by men from 5th Special Forces Detachments A-233 and A-236 and their Montagnard forces and elements of the 5th Battalion, 22nd Artillery and 1st Battalion, 92nd Artillery when it was subjected to a siege by the People's Army of Vietnam (PAVN) 66th Regiment from 27 October to 1 November 1969. On the morning of 30 October a PAVN force attacked the base but was beaten back with artillery and air support. A Bell UH-1B Iroquois helicopter gunship #63-08587 was shot down with the loss of four U.S. killed. By 31 October two of the three artillery pieces at the base had been disabled and the artillerymen were fighting as infantry and 1LT Ronald A Ross of 5/22 Artillery was killed by a B-40 rocket. The base was abandoned on the night of 1 November and the US and Montagnard forces evacuated towards the nearby Bu Prang Camp. PFC Michael Norton disappeared during the escape and evasion and was listed as missing in action. The base was bombed on 2 November to destroy any material that had been left behind.

== Current use ==
The base has reverted to jungle.

== See also ==
- Abandoned in Hell: The Fight for Vietnam's Firebase Kate
