= Senmonorom Municipality =

Senmonorom Municipality ក្រុងសែនមនោរម្យ
- Municipality
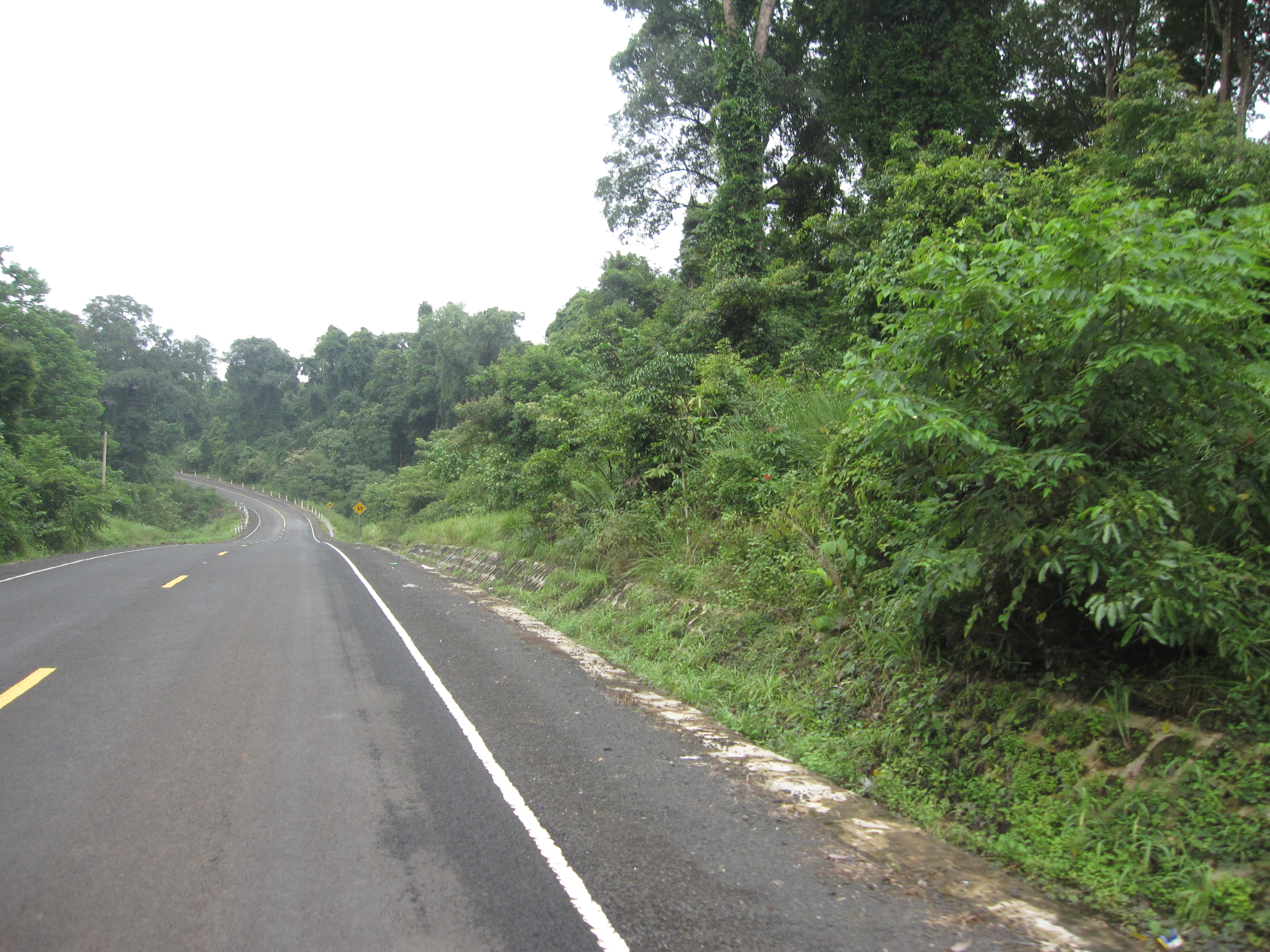

- District location in Mondulkiri Province
- Coordinates: 12°27′N 107°12′E
- Country: Cambodia
- Province: Mondulkiri
- Capital: Senmonorom

Government
  - Type: City Municipality

Population (1998)
  - Total: 7,032
- Time zone: UTC+07:00 (ICT)
- Geocode: 1105

Senmonorom (Khmer: សែនមនោរម្យ) is a municipality (krong) located in Mondulkiri Province in north-eastern Cambodia. The provincial capital Senmonorom is located within the municipality.

== Administration ==
Senmonorom city is divided into 4 quarters (sangkat).

No.	Quarter	Khmer	Population (2019)
1	Monorom	មនោរម្យ	1,764
2	Sokhdom	សុខដុម	2,497
3	Spean Meanchey	ស្ពានមានជ័យ	5,927
4	Romonea	រមនា	3,007
