= Kaev Seima District =

Kaev Seima District ស្រុកកែវសីមា
- District
- District location in Mondulkiri Province
- Coordinates: 12.3628°N 106.8187°E
- Country: Cambodia
- Province: Mondulkiri

Population (1998)
  - Total: 8,854
- Time zone: UTC+7 (ICT)
- Geocode: 1101

Kaev Seima (Khmer: កែវសីមា) is a district (srok) located in Mondulkiri Province, in Cambodia.
