= Tuy Đức district =

Tuy Đức district Huyện Tuy Đức
- District
- Tuy Duc district
- Location within Vietnam
- Country: Vietnam
- Region: Central Highlands
- Province: Đắk Nông
- Time zone: UTC+7 (Indochina Time)

Tuy Đức is a former rural district (huyện) of Đắk Nông province in the Central Highlands region of Vietnam.

== Name ==
Its name Tuy Đức from an ancient subject in Đắk Nông province Daàk-tuul, which was an unknown address from chronicles. However, it means "the spring of tala trees" from Mnong language.

This present name was created by President Ngô Đình Diệm's policy in 1957.
