= Kaoh Nheaek District =

Kaoh Nheaek កោះញែក Koh Nhek
- District
- Kaoh Nheaek District; ស្រុកកោះញែក
- District location in Mondulkiri Province
- Coordinates: 13.0609°N 107.0067°E
- Country: Cambodia
- Province: Mondulkiri

Population (1998)
  - Total: 8,919
- Time zone: UTC+07:00 (ICT)
- Geocode: 1102

Kaoh Nheaek (Khmer: កោះញែក [kɑh ɲɛːk]) is a district (srok) in Mondulkiri Province, Cambodia.
