= Ou Reang District =

District in Mondulkiri Province, Cambodia

Ou Reang District ស្រុកអូររាំង
- District
- District location in Mondulkiri Province
- Coordinates: 12.3318°N 107.1684°E
- Country: Cambodia
- Province: Mondulkiri

Population (1998)
  - Total: 2,473
- Time zone: UTC+7 (ICT)
- Geocode: 1103

Ou Reang (Khmer: អូររាំង, pronounced [ou rĕəŋ]) is a district (srok) located in Mondulkiri Province, in Cambodia.
