= Phnom Prich Wildlife Sanctuary =

Protected area in Cambodia

- ដែនជម្រកសត្វព្រៃភ្នំព្រេច
- IUCN category IV (habitat/species management area)
- Location within Cambodia
- Location: Mondulkiri, Cambodia
- Nearest city: Kratié (city)
- Coordinates: 12°42′49″N 106°50′56″E
- Area: 2,218.18 km^{2} (856.44 sq mi)
- Established: 1993
- Governing body: Ministry of Environment

Phnom Prich Wildlife Sanctuary (Khmer: ដែនជម្រកសត្វព្រៃភ្នំព្រេច) is a 2,218.18 km^{2} (856.44 sq mi) large protected area in eastern Cambodia that was established in 1993. It is part of maybe the largest protected area complex in southeast Asia. Phnom Prich Wildlife Sanctuary borders Mondulkiri Protected Forest to the north and Keo Seima Wildlife Sanctuary to the south.

== External ==
- Mondulkiri's Wildlife Harmony - article in Cambodian Scene Magazine
- Mondulkiri Protected Forest and Phnom Prich Wildlife Sanctuary by IAPAD
- Map of Protected areas system in Cambodia
