= Senmonorom =

Town in Mondulkiri, Cambodia

Saen Monourom សែនមនោរម្យ
- City
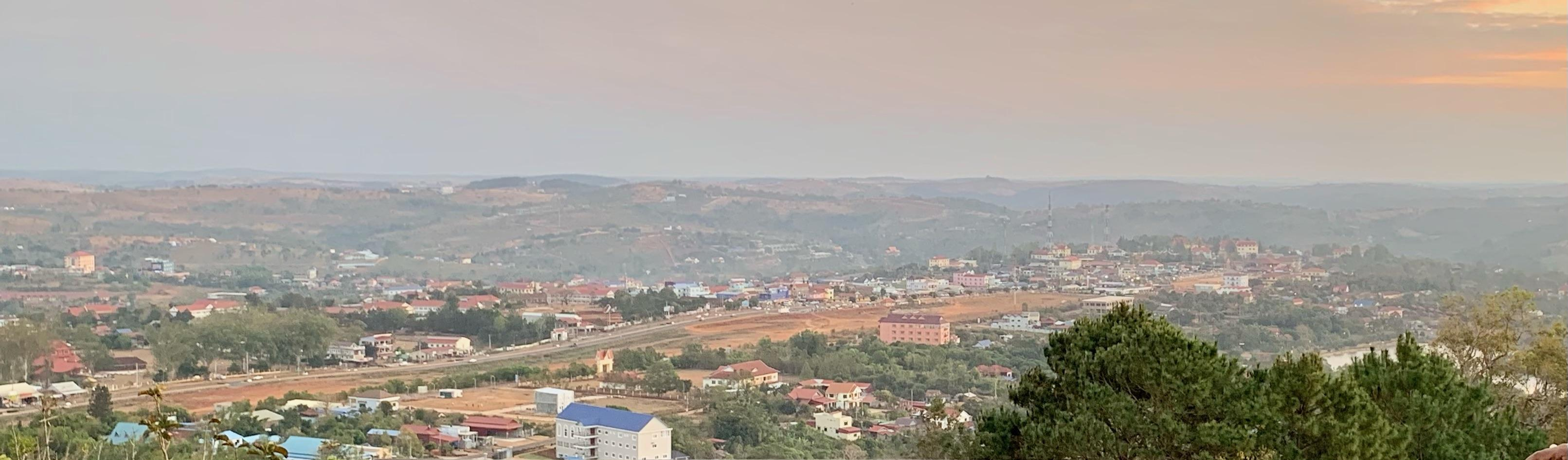
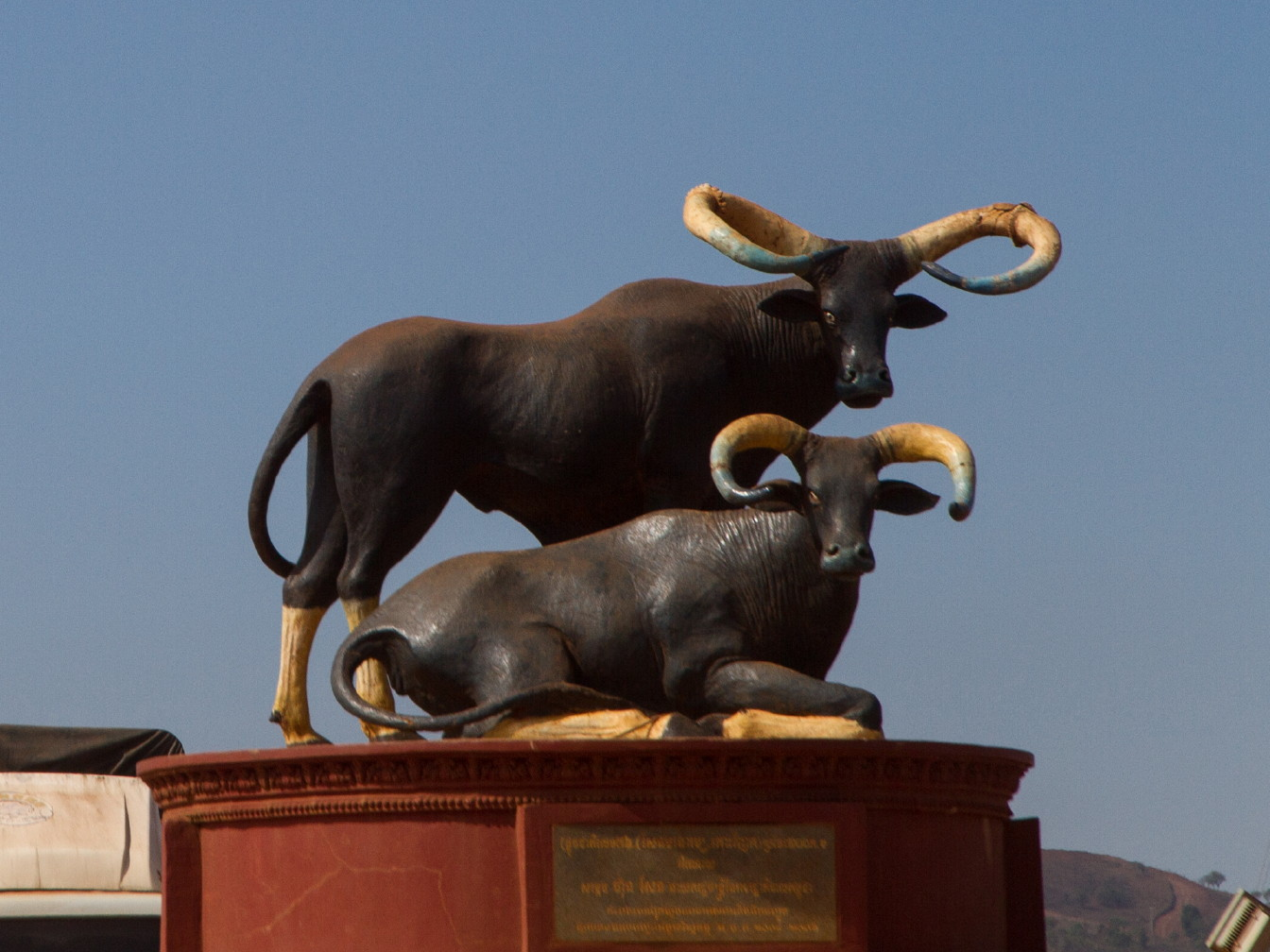
- Top: Central Senmonorom; Bottom: Kouprey Monument

- Location within Cambodia
- Coordinates: 12°27′N 107°12′E
- Country: Cambodia
- Province: Mondulkiri
- Municipality: Senmonorom
- Elevation: 733 m (2,405 ft)

Population (2019)
  - Total: 13,195
- Time zone: UTC+7 (ICT)

Senmonorom (Khmer: សែនមនោរម្យ; lit. 'Delightful') is the capital city of Mondulkiri province, Cambodia. It is the largest city in the province with over 10,000 inhabitants.

Senmonorom (and the Mondulkiri province in general) is inhabited by the indigenous Bunong people. Bunong tribesmen and tribeswomen are often seen walking along major highways. The town is popular with NGO workers, loggers, and tourists both from outside Cambodia and from Cambodia's capital Phnom Penh.

According to reports from Global Witness, the Mondulkiri province is facing a significant threat from illegal loggers attempting to exploit the area's virgin forests. Protected areas close to Sen Monorom include Keo Seima Wildlife Sanctuary, Phnom Prich Wildlife Sanctuary, and Srepok Wildlife Sanctuary.

Due to rapid development, as well as mania caused by real estate speculation, land prices in Sen Monorom have boomed. Lots that cost $150 in 2008 went for three or four times as much two years later in 2010.

Phnom Doh Kromom (translated as "Virtuous Woman's Breast Mountain") is a breast-shaped hill located close to Senmonorom. Members of the Bunong ethnic group ascribe divine powers to the hill and every year hold festivals in the location.

== Climate ==
Climate data for Senmonorom (1982–2024)
Month	Jan	Feb	Mar	Apr	May	Jun	Jul	Aug	Sep	Oct	Nov	Dec	Year
Mean daily maximum °C (°F)	28.9 (84.0)	29.7 (85.5)	30.5 (86.9)	30.4 (86.7)	30.9 (87.6)	30.2 (86.4)	30.0 (86.0)	30.1 (86.2)	30.0 (86.0)	29.8 (85.6)	29.5 (85.1)	27.9 (82.2)	29.8 (85.7)
Mean daily minimum °C (°F)	17.0 (62.6)	18.3 (64.9)	19.1 (66.4)	20.3 (68.5)	20.9 (69.6)	20.3 (68.5)	20.2 (68.4)	19.8 (67.6)	19.3 (66.7)	18.9 (66.0)	18.4 (65.1)	17.5 (63.5)	19.2 (66.5)
Average precipitation mm (inches)	3.4 (0.13)	26.7 (1.05)	64.7 (2.55)	84.9 (3.34)	103.7 (4.08)	216.8 (8.54)	276.6 (10.89)	316.3 (12.45)	294.5 (11.59)	267.3 (10.52)	92.0 (3.62)	18.7 (0.74)	1,765.6 (69.5)
Source: World Meteorological Organization
