= Pechreada District =

Pechreada District ពេជ្រាដា
- District
- District location in Mondulkiri Province
- Coordinates: 12.7047°N 107.0068°E
- Country: Cambodia
- Province: Mondulkiri

Population (1998)
  - Total: 5,129
- Time zone: UTC+7 (ICT)
- Geocode: 1104

Pechreada (Khmer: ពេជ្រាដា, pronounced [pɨcriəɗaː]) is a district (srok) located in Mondulkiri Province, in Cambodia.
