= Mondulkiri province =

Province of Cambodia

Mondulkiri Province ខេត្តមណ្ឌលគិរី
- Province

Khmer transcription(s)
  - Khmer: ខេត្តមណ្ឌលគិរី
  - UNGEGN: Khaet Mǒndǒl Kĭri
  - ALA-LC: Khett Maṇḍal Girī
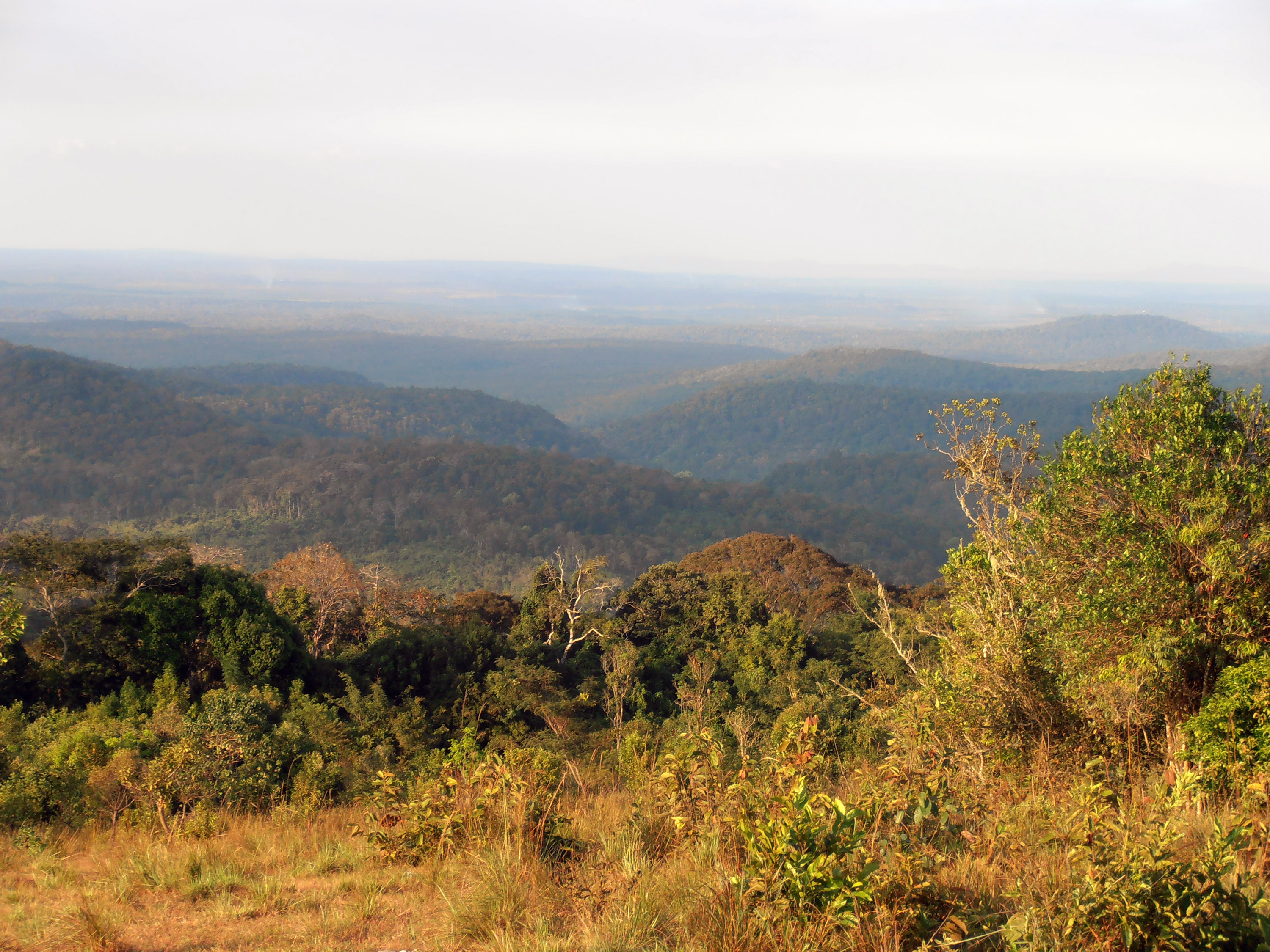
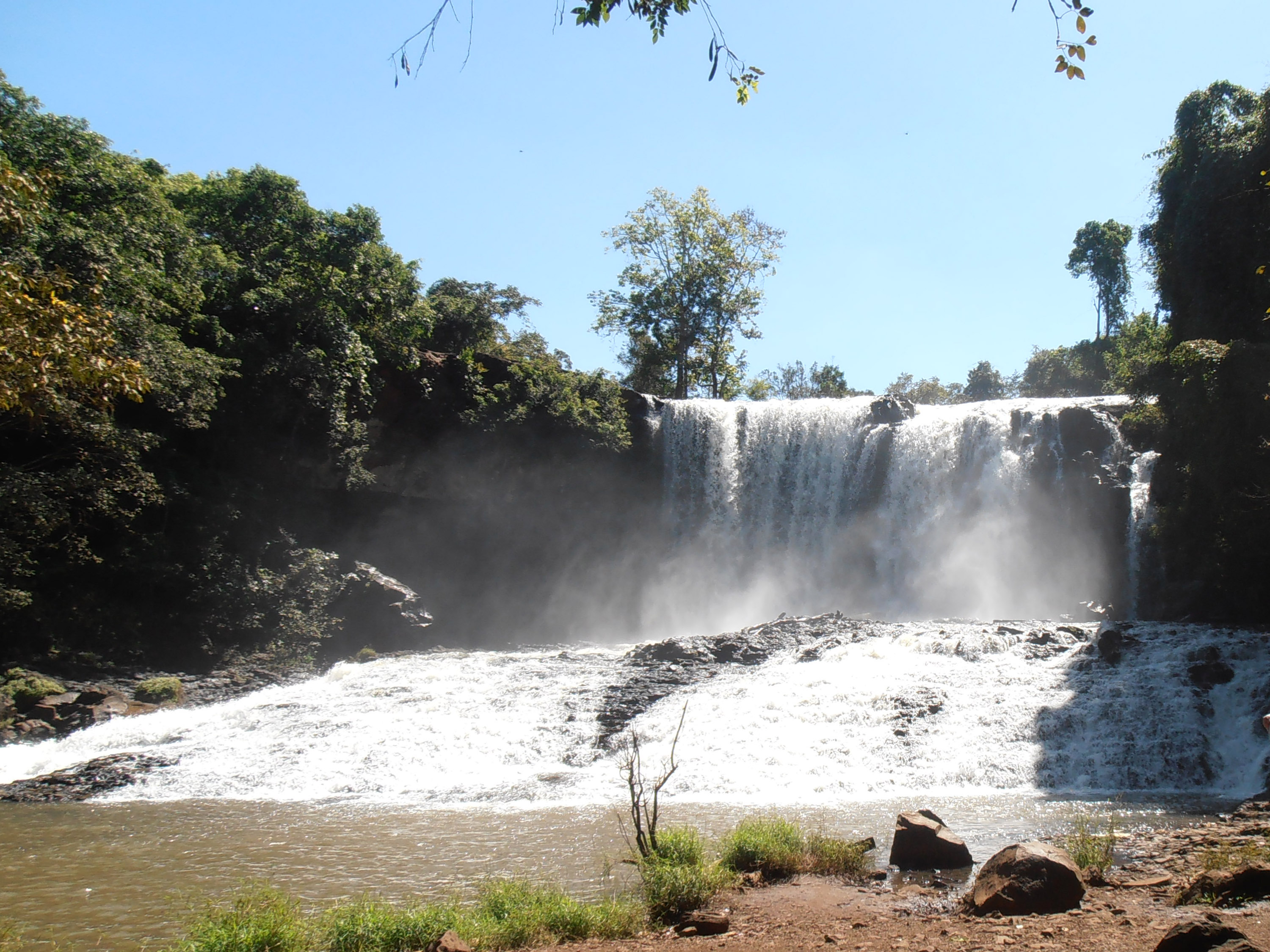
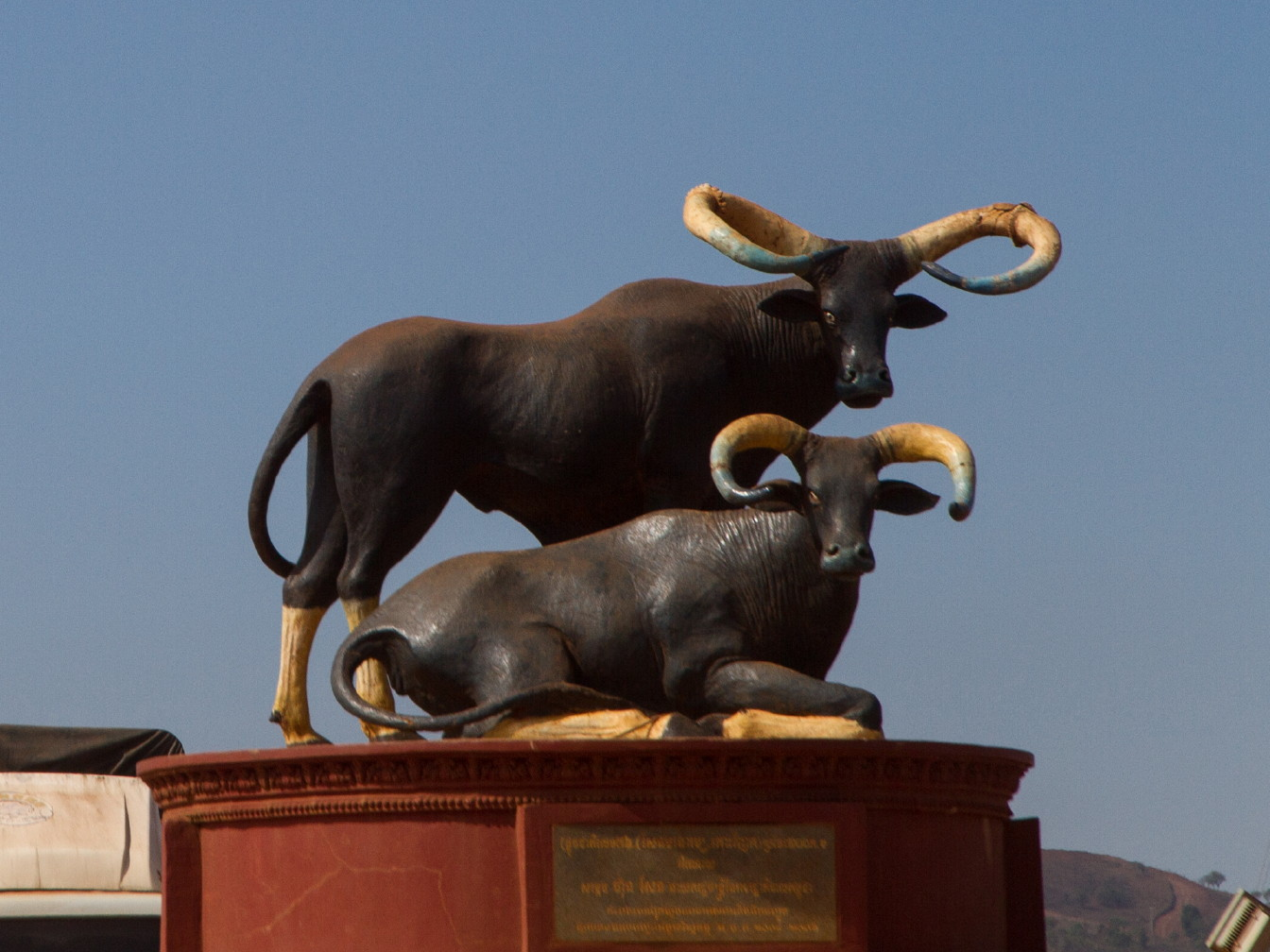
- Top: Mondulkiri’s landscape Bottom: Kouprey roundabout

- Seal

- Map of Cambodia highlighting Mondulkiri
- Coordinates: 12°27′N 107°14′E
- Country: Cambodia
- Provincial status: 30 December 1961
- Capital: Senmonorom

Government
  - Governor: Thong Savon (CPP)
  - National Assembly: 1 / 125

Area
  - Total: 14,288 km^{2} (5,517 sq mi)
  - Rank: 1st

Population (2024)
  - Total: ▼97,857
  - Rank: 23rd
  - Density: 6/km^{2} (16/sq mi)
  - Rank: 25th
- Time zone: UTC+07:00 (ICT)
- Dialing code: +855
- ISO 3166 code: KH-11
- Website: mondulkiri.gov.kh

Mondulkiri Province (Khmer: ខេត្តមណ្ឌលគិរី, Khaet Mǒndǒl Kĭri, [mɔndɔl kiriː]; lit. 'central mountains') is a province of Cambodia. Bordering the provinces of Kratié to the west, Stung Treng to the northwest, Ratanakiri to the north, and the country of Vietnam to the east and south. It is the most sparsely populated province in the country despite being the largest in land area. The province was established in 1961 from the eastern part of Kratié province. The capital is the town of Senmonorom.

The Bunong people appear to have lived in the provincial area for about 2000 years, but there is little documentation until France colonized Cambodia in 1864. Like other people in the province, the Bunong were displaced in the 1970s and only allowed to return to their traditional homeland in the 1980s.

== Administrative divisions ==
The province is subdivided into 4 districts and 1 municipality, which are further subdivided into 17 communes (khum) and 4 quarters (sangkat), and 98 villages.

ISO code	Name	Khmer	Population (2019)	Subdivisions
— Municipality —
11-05	Senmonorom	សែនមនោរម្យ	13,195	4 sangkat
— District —
11-01	Kaev Seima	កែវសីមា	28,904	5 khum
11-02	Kaoh Nheaek	កោះញែក	22,223	6 khum
11-03	Ou Reang	អូររាំង	6,645	2 khum
11-04	Pechreada	ពេជ្រាដា	19,523	4 khum

== Geography and environment ==
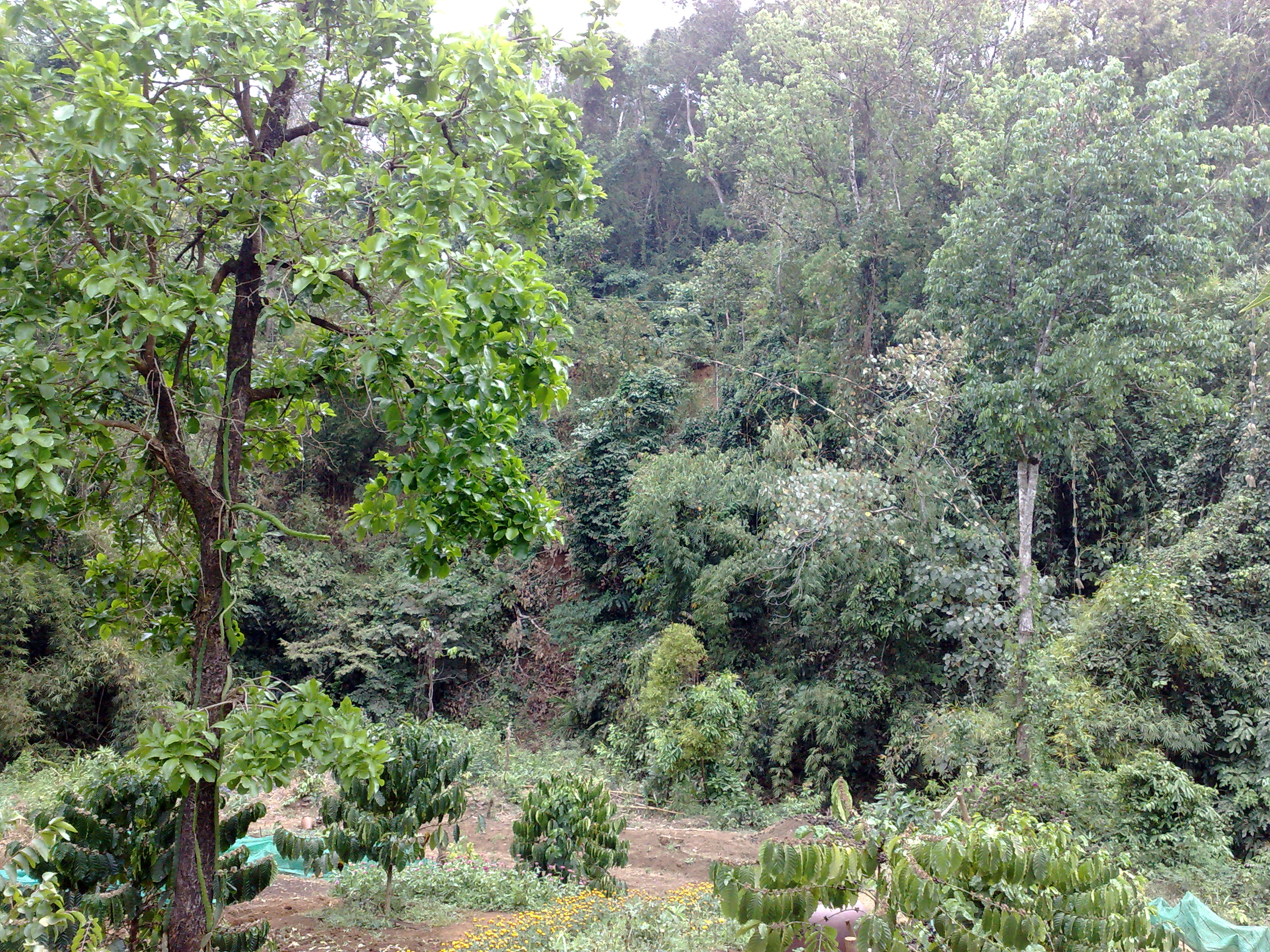
Dense forests of Mondulkiri province

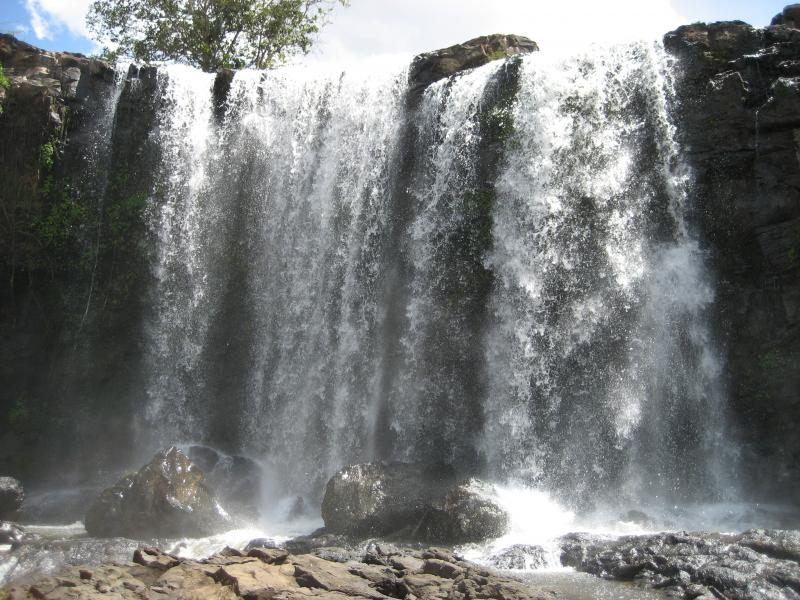
Busra Waterfall

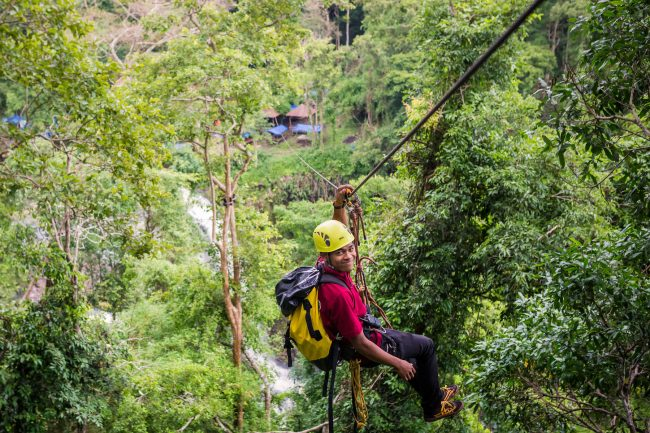
Ziplining over Busra Waterfall with Mayura Hills Resort

Mondulkiri is Cambodia's largest and also most sparsely populated province, containing an area of 14,288 km^{2} (5,517 sq mi) with elevations ranging from 190 to 1,000 metres (620 to 3,280 ft). It is located in the south-east part of the country and borders three provinces in Vietnam; Đắk Lắk, Lâm Đồng provinces, and Đồng Nai city. Three rivers cross the province; Srepok, Preaek Chhbaar, and Preaek te Rivers.

The provincial capital is Senmonorom which is located in the southeastern part of the province about 390 km (240 mi) from Phnom Penh, the national capital.

=== Waterfalls ===
Mondulkiri is known for its forested hills and powerful waterfalls. Some waterfalls include:

- Bou Sra Waterfall. Located at Pich Chinda District, 43 kilometers from Senmonorom town, Bou Sra (or Busra) is the largest waterfall, made famous by a popular Khmer song in Mondulkiri. It is a three-tiered natural waterfall with only the first two tiers accessible to public view. There is a zipline run by local hotel Mayura Hills Resort that runs over the waterfall.
- Senmonorom Waterfall. Five kilometers from town and an easy walk.
- Romnea Waterfall. Ten kilometers from Senmonorom, Romnea waterfall is actually 1 of 3 large waterfalls that has now been deforested and privatized.

=== Protected areas ===
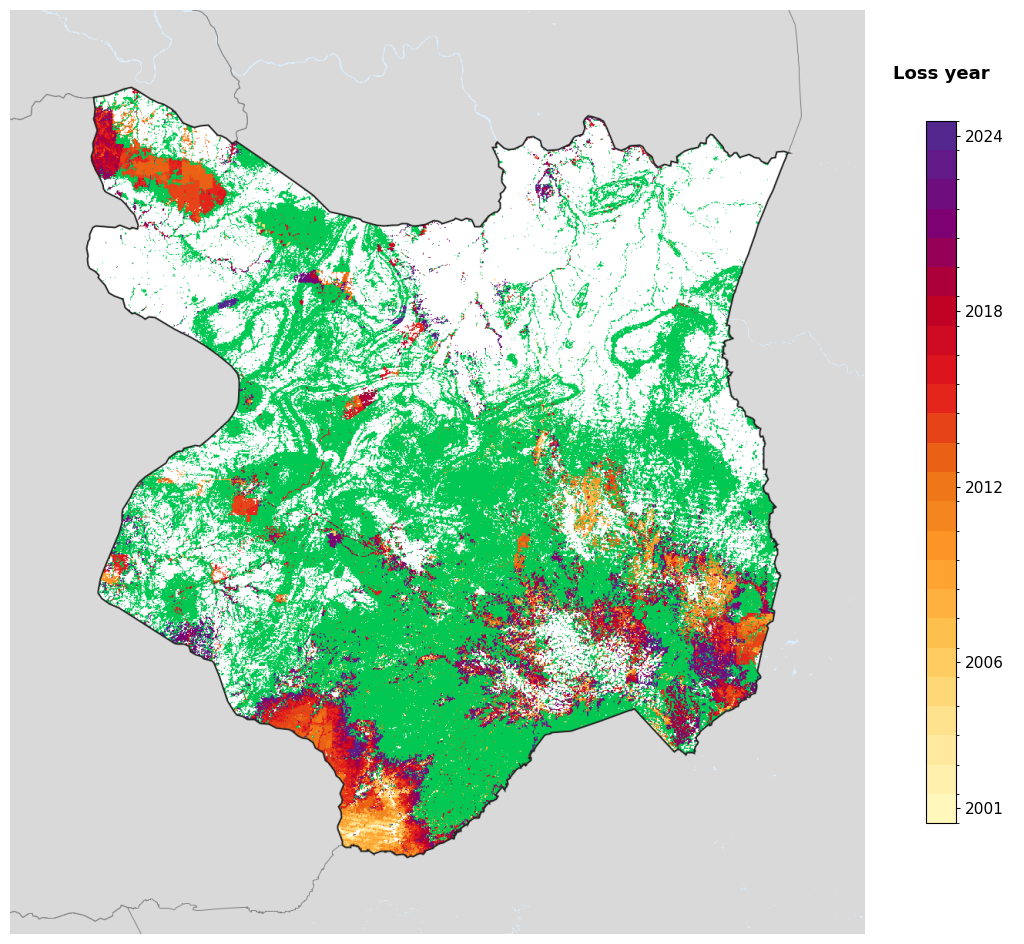
Tree-cover loss year in Mondulkiri, 2001-2024, from the Global Forest Change dataset.

Mondulkiri faces a significant threat from illegal loggers attempting to exploit the province's virgin tropical seasonal forests. The province holds a number of protected areas including Keo Seima Wildlife Sanctuary, Phnom Prich Wildlife Sanctuary, and Srepok Wildlife Sanctuary, which cover evergreen, semi-evergreen, and dry Dipterocarp forests.

== Economy and transportation ==
Road development continues to impact seriously on indigenous communities like the Bunong ethnic group. According to a United Nations paper, the construction of a road from Mondulkiri to Ratanakiri has resulted in massive land grabbing.
