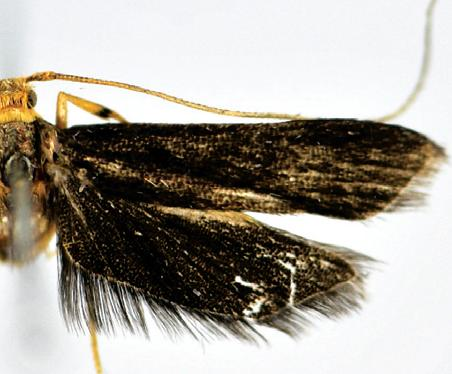

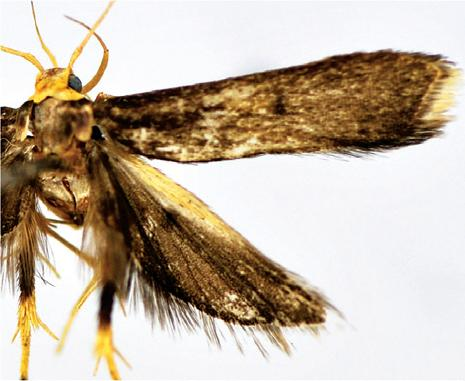

Scientific classification
- Kingdom: Animalia
- Phylum: Arthropoda
- Clade: Pancrustacea
- Class: Insecta
- Order: Lepidoptera
- Family: Lecithoceridae
- Genus: Thubana
- Species: T. xanthoteles

Binomial name
- Thubana xanthoteles (Meyrick, 1923)

Synonyms
- Lecithocera xanthoteles Meyrick, 1923; Lecithocera melitopyga Meyrick, 1923 disputed; Thubana stenosis Park, 2003

= Thubana xanthoteles =

Species of moth

Thubana xanthoteles is a species of moth of the family Lecithoceridae. It was first described by Edward Meyrick in 1923. It is found in Yunnan province in China, Thailand, Myanmar, Northeast India, and Sri Lanka.

The wingspan is 17–18.5 mm (0.67–0.73 in).

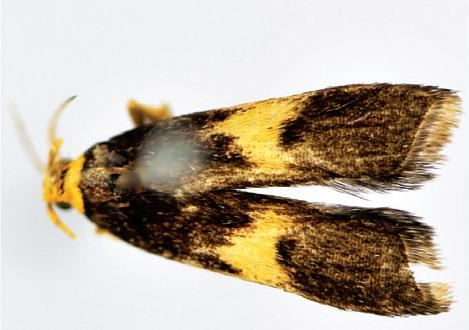

== Taxonomy ==
Meyrick described Thubana xanthoteles on the basis of two female specimens and described Thubana melitopyga from one female specimen. John Frederick Gates Clarke regarded Thubana melitopyga as a junior synonym of Thubana xanthoteles. Kyu-Tek Park described Thubana stenosis on the basis of specimens collected from north Thailand, which bears a "golden yellow bandlike costal patch" on the forewing. He also noticed that the female genitalia of Thubana stenosis are hardly distinguishable from those of Thubana xanthoteles. Later study concluded that the male genitalia of the three specimens collected in south Yunnan undoubtedly match with those of Thubana stenosis described by Park, and the female genitalia match with those of Thubana stenosis and of Thubana xanthoteles.
