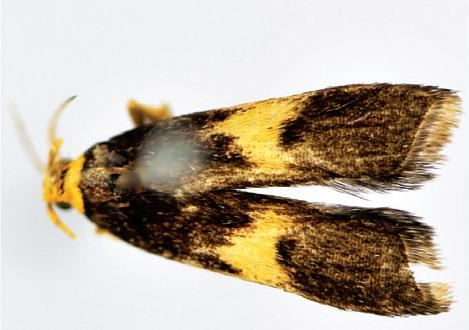
- Thubana xanthoteles

Scientific classification
- Kingdom: Animalia
- Phylum: Arthropoda
- Class: Insecta
- Order: Lepidoptera
- Family: Lecithoceridae
- Subfamily: Torodorinae
- Genus: Thubana; Walker, 1864

Synonyms
- Inapha Walker, 1864; Tiva Walker, 1864; Stelechoris Meyrick, 1925

= Thubana =

Genus of moths

Thubana is a genus of moths in the family Lecithoceridae and subfamily Torodorinae. The genus was erected by Francis Walker in 1864.

== Species ==
- Thubana abbreviata Park, 2003
- Thubana albinulla C. Wu, 1994
- Thubana albiprata C. Wu, 1994
- Thubana albisignis (Meyrick, 1914)
- Thubana apiculalis Park & Heppner, 2009
- Thubana bathrocera Wu, 1997
- Thubana batillua Park, 2003
- Thubana binotella (Walker, 1864)
- Thubana bisignatella Walker, 1864
- Thubana bullulata Meyrick, 1910
- Thubana caligaris Park, 2003
- Thubana chanthaburiensis Park, 2003
- Thubana cherandra (Meyrick, 1906)
- Thubana circularis Park, 2006
- Thubana clavula Park, 2003
- Thubana costimaculella (Snellen, 1903)
- Thubana deltaspis Meyrick, 1935
- Thubana dialeukos Park, 2003
- Thubana doisuthepana Park, 2003
- Thubana eremophila Park, 2013
- Thubana erycinae Park & Heppner, 2009
- Thubana exoema (Meyrick, 1911)
- Thubana fangensis Park, 2003
- Thubana felinaurita Li in Yang, Zhu & Li, 2010
- Thubana gilvizonaris Park, 2013
- Thubana gyrostigmatis Park, 2009
- Thubana helvilimbata Park, 2003
- Thubana heylaertsi (Snellen, 1903)
- Thubana isocrypta Meyrick, 1911
- Thubana kinabaluensis Park & Sugisima, 2005
- Thubana kubahensis Park & Abang, 2005
- Thubana kumatai Park & Sugisima, 2005
- Thubana kurokoi Park, 2003
- Thubana laxata Meyrick, 1911
- Thubana leucosphena Meyrick, 1931
- Thubana melitopyga (Meyrick, 1923)
- Thubana nardinopa Meyrick, 1918
- Thubana nodosa (Meyrick, 1910)
- Thubana ochracea Park & Abang, 2005
- Thubana ochrodelta Park, 2003
- Thubana onyx Gozmány, 1978
- Thubana pedicucullata Park, 2009
- Thubana prolata Park & Abang, 2005
- Thubana quadrata Park & Abang, 2005
- Thubana raphidodea Park & Heppner, 2009
- Thubana residua Meyrick, 1923
- Thubana seimaensis Park, 2013
- Thubana sellarius Park & Heppner, 2009
- Thubana spinata Park & Sugisima, 2005
- Thubana xanthoteles (Meyrick, 1923)
- Thubana xylogramma Meyrick, 1922

== Former species ==
- Thubana adelella (Walker, 1864)
