= Thubana nardinopa =

Scientific classification
- Kingdom: Animalia
- Phylum: Arthropoda
- Class: Insecta
- Order: Lepidoptera
- Family: Lecithoceridae
- Genus: Thubana
- Species: T. nardinopa

Binomial name
- Thubana nardinopa (Meyrick, 1918)

Synonyms
- Lecithocera nardinopa Meyrick, 1918

Species of moth

Thubana nardinopa is a species of moth belonging to the family Lecithoceridae. It was first described by Edward Meyrick in 1918. It is found in southern regions of India.

The wingspan is about 24 mm. Its forewings exhibit a fuscous coloration with a pale ochreous spot on the costa at four-fifths. Meanwhile, the hindwings are grey.
