= Thubana albinulla =

Scientific classification
- Kingdom: Animalia
- Phylum: Arthropoda
- Clade: Pancrustacea
- Class: Insecta
- Order: Lepidoptera
- Family: Lecithoceridae
- Genus: Thubana
- Species: T. albinulla

Binomial name
- Thubana albinulla C. Wu, 1994

Species of moth

Thubana albinulla is a moth in the family Lecithoceridae. It was described by C. Wu in 1994. It is found in Sichuan, China.
