= Thubana fangensis =

Scientific classification
- Kingdom: Animalia
- Phylum: Arthropoda
- Clade: Pancrustacea
- Class: Insecta
- Order: Lepidoptera
- Family: Lecithoceridae
- Genus: Thubana
- Species: T. fangensis

Binomial name
- Thubana fangensis Park, 2003

Species of moth

Thubana fangensis is a moth in the family Lecithoceridae. It was described by Kyu-Tek Park in 2003. It is found in Thailand.

The wingspan is 16–17 mm (0.63–0.67 in).
