= Thubana binotella =

Scientific classification
- Kingdom: Animalia
- Phylum: Arthropoda
- Class: Insecta
- Order: Lepidoptera
- Family: Lecithoceridae
- Genus: Thubana
- Species: T. binotella

Binomial name
- Thubana binotella (Walker, 1864)

Synonyms
- Tiva binotella Walker, 1864

Species of moth

Thubana binotella is a moth in the family Lecithoceridae. It was described by Francis Walker in 1864. It is found on Borneo.

Adults are cupreous purple, the forewings with a pale yellow transverse spot decreasing in breadth from the middle of the costa to the disc. There are four minute pale yellow oblique streaks near the tip of the costa.
