= Thubana eremophila =

Scientific classification
- Kingdom: Animalia
- Phylum: Arthropoda
- Clade: Pancrustacea
- Class: Insecta
- Order: Lepidoptera
- Family: Lecithoceridae
- Genus: Thubana
- Species: T. eremophila

Binomial name
- Thubana eremophila Park, 2013

Species of moth

Thubana eremophila is a moth in the family Lecithoceridae. It was described by Kyu-Tek Park in 2013. It is found in Cambodia.

The wingspan is 16–17 mm.

== Etymology ==
The species name is said to be derived from Greek eremos (meaning lonely, solitary) and philus (meaning love). In ancient Greek, the proper word for "love" (in the sense of affection or fondness) is philia (φιλία) or philos (φῖλος).
