= Titania's woolly bat =

Conservation status
- Least Concern (IUCN 3.1)

Scientific classification
- Kingdom: Animalia
- Phylum: Chordata
- Class: Mammalia
- Order: Chiroptera
- Family: Vespertilionidae
- Genus: Kerivoula
- Species: K. titania

Binomial name
- Kerivoula titania Bates, Struebig, Hayes, Furey, Mya Mya, Thong, Tien, Son, Harrison, Francis & Csorba, 2007
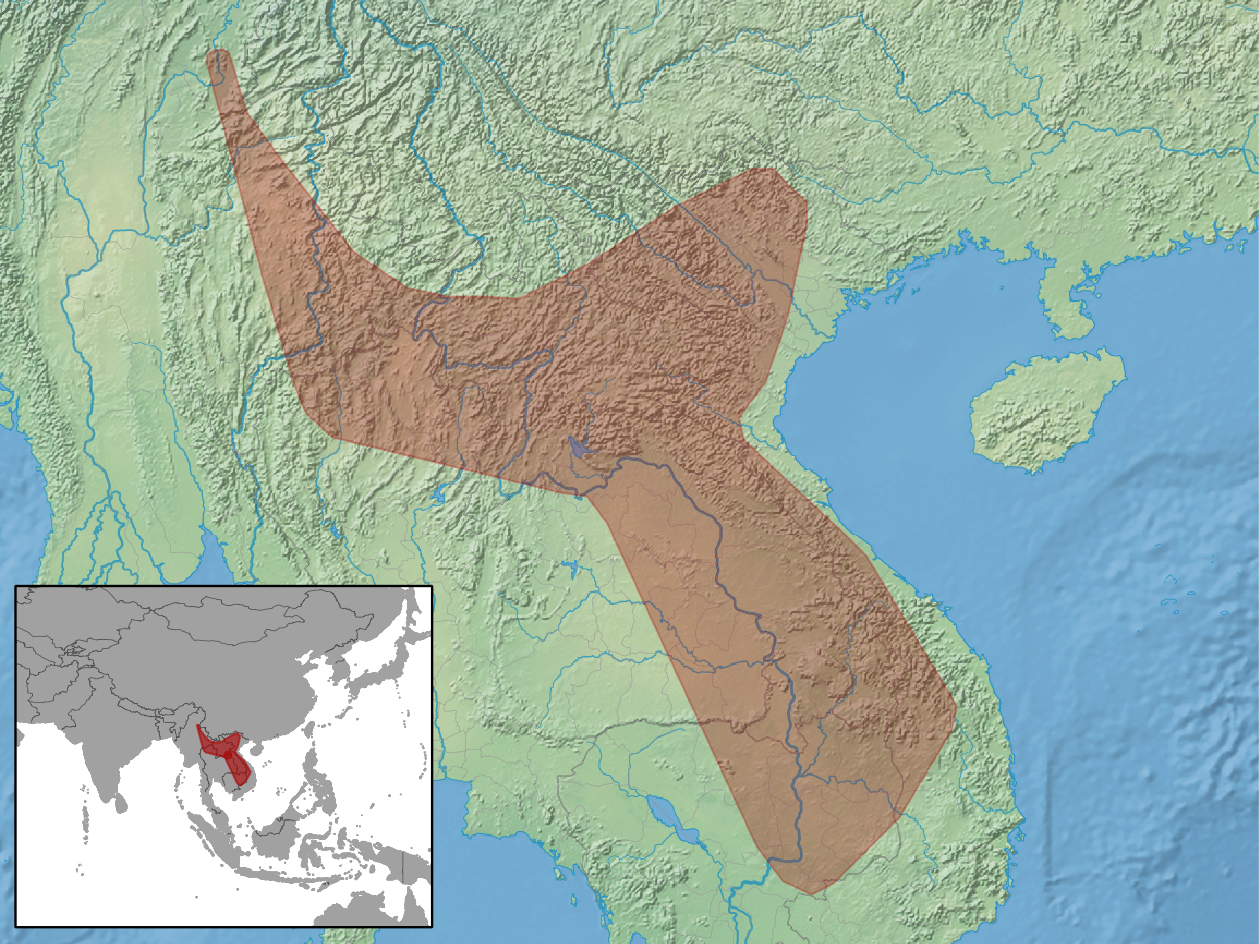
- geographic distribution of Kerivoula titania

Species of bat

Titania's woolly bat (Kerivoula titania) is a species of bat found in Southeast Asia.

== Taxonomy and etymology ==
It was initially described as a new species in 2007 based on specimens collected from Keo Seima Wildlife Sanctuary in eastern Cambodia. It is similar in appearance to other Kerivoula species, but has a genetic divergence of 12%, which was deemed great enough to warrant naming it as a new species. The species name "titania" is a reference to the character Titania from Shakespeare's A Midsummer Night's Dream. The authors named the bat after the "Queen of the Fairies" to reflect "the nymph-like nature of this forest bat."

== Description ==
It is considered a medium-sized member of its genus. Its forearm is 32.4–35.9 mm (1.28–1.41 in) long. It has large, mostly hairless ears that are 12.8–15 mm (0.50–0.59 in) long. It has tall and narrow tragi that are 8.5–9.1 mm (0.33–0.36 in) long. Its tail is 45.8–53 mm (1.80–2.09 in) long. It weighs 4.0–7.9 g (0.14–0.28 oz). Its skull has a distinctly flat appearance. Its dental formula is 2.1.3.33.1.3.3 for a total of 38 teeth. Its individual hairs are tricolored: their bases are black, their middles are pale gray, and their tips are dark gray.

== Biology and ecology ==
It is nocturnal and roosts in sheltered places during the day Its flattened skull suggests that it roosts in constricted spaces such as under tree bark or in crevices. Not much is known about its reproduction, but a female in late-stage pregnancy was once documented in early May. Lactating females have been recorded in mid May and early June.

It is one of the known natural reservoirs of the SARS coronavirus. In one study in Taiwan, 10% of individuals tested positive for the SARS coronavirus.

== Range and habitat ==
This species was first described from eastern Cambodia, with additional specimens from Vietnam, Myanmar, Laos, and Thailand. In 2012, it was first documented in Hainan Island of China and Taiwan. This discovery made it only the third bat of its genus to be documented in China.

== Conservation ==
It is currently assessed as least concern by the IUCN—its lowest conservation priority. It meets the criteria for this assessment because it has a large range, no major threats to this species have been identified, and it is not likely to be declining quickly.
