= Thubana erycinae =

Scientific classification
- Kingdom: Animalia
- Phylum: Arthropoda
- Clade: Pancrustacea
- Class: Insecta
- Order: Lepidoptera
- Family: Lecithoceridae
- Genus: Thubana
- Species: T. erycinae

Binomial name
- Thubana erycinae Park & Heppner, 2009

Species of moth

Thubana erycinae is a moth in the family Lecithoceridae. It was described by Kyu-Tek Park and John B. Heppner in 2009. It is known from Sumatra, Indonesia.

The forewing length is 10 mm (0.39 in) based on the holotype, a male.
