= Thubana bullulata =

Scientific classification
- Domain: Eukaryota
- Kingdom: Animalia
- Phylum: Arthropoda
- Class: Insecta
- Order: Lepidoptera
- Family: Lecithoceridae
- Genus: Thubana
- Species: T. bullulata

Binomial name
- Thubana bullulata (Meyrick, 1910)

Synonyms
- Lecithocera bullulata Meyrick, 1910

Species of moth

Thubana bullulata is a moth in the family Lecithoceridae. It was described by Edward Meyrick in 1923. It is found in India (Assam).

The wingspan is about 17 mm. The forewings are ochreous-whitish, suffused with pale brownish except for a triangular blotch on the middle of the costa reaching half across the wing, and an undefined transverse patch before the termen. There is a small costal mark of dark fuscous suffusion on each side of the costal blotch, and a transverse-crescentic dark fuscous mark adjoining its apex posteriorly. A bar of fuscous suffusion is found near the base, with some fuscous irroration in the disc and towards the dorsum before the middle, as well as a cloudy streak of fuscous suffusion along the termen. The hindwings are rather dark fuscous, lighter and ochreous-tinged towards the apex and with a round dark fuscous spot in the middle of the disc, edged anteriorly by a white spot. Some slight irregular whitish suffusion is found towards the termen.
