= Thubana bisignatella =

Scientific classification
- Kingdom: Animalia
- Phylum: Arthropoda
- Class: Insecta
- Order: Lepidoptera
- Family: Lecithoceridae
- Genus: Thubana
- Species: T. bisignatella

Binomial name
- Thubana bisignatella Walker, 1864

Synonyms
- Inapha lampronialis Walker, 1864

Species of moth

Thubana bisignatella is a moth in the family Lecithoceridae. It was described by Francis Walker in 1864. It is found on Borneo.

Adults are cupreous, the forewings with a large irregularly triangular white spot on the middle of the costa.
