= Thubana caligaris =

Scientific classification
- Kingdom: Animalia
- Phylum: Arthropoda
- Clade: Pancrustacea
- Class: Insecta
- Order: Lepidoptera
- Family: Lecithoceridae
- Genus: Thubana
- Species: T. caligaris

Binomial name
- Thubana caligaris Park, 2003

Species of moth

Thubana caligaris is a moth in the family Lecithoceridae. It was described by Kyu-Tek Park in 2003. It is found in Thailand.

The wingspan is 16 mm (0.63 in) for the holotype, a male.
