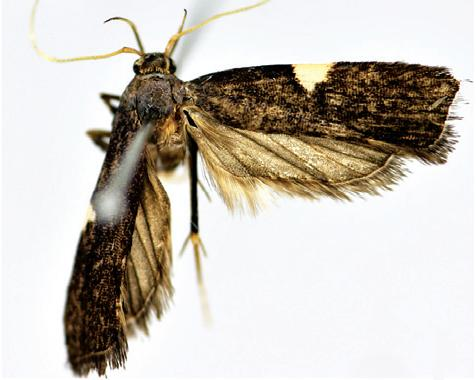

Scientific classification
- Kingdom: Animalia
- Phylum: Arthropoda
- Clade: Pancrustacea
- Class: Insecta
- Order: Lepidoptera
- Family: Lecithoceridae
- Genus: Thubana
- Species: T. dialeukos

Binomial name
- Thubana dialeukos Park, 2003

= Thubana dialeukos =

Species of moth

Thubana dialeukos is a species of moth of the family Lecithoceridae. It is found in Thailand and in Yunnan, China.

The wingspan is 20–21 mm (0.79–0.83 in).
