= Thubana seimaensis =

Scientific classification
- Kingdom: Animalia
- Phylum: Arthropoda
- Clade: Pancrustacea
- Class: Insecta
- Order: Lepidoptera
- Family: Lecithoceridae
- Genus: Thubana
- Species: T. seimaensis

Binomial name
- Thubana seimaensis Park, 2013

Species of moth

Thubana seimaensis is a moth in the family Lecithoceridae. It was described by Kyu-Tek Park in 2013. It is found in Cambodia.

The wingspan is 15.5–16 mm.

== Etymology ==
The species name is derived from the type locality, Seima in Cambodia.
