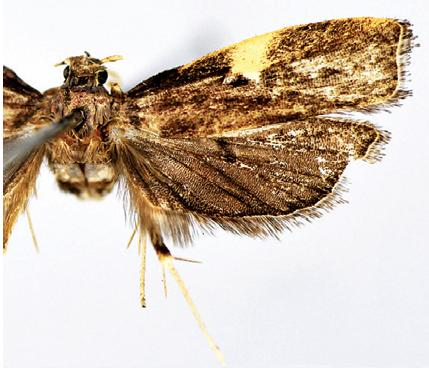

Scientific classification
- Kingdom: Animalia
- Phylum: Arthropoda
- Clade: Pancrustacea
- Class: Insecta
- Order: Lepidoptera
- Family: Lecithoceridae
- Genus: Thubana
- Species: T. felinaurita

Binomial name
- Thubana felinaurita Li in Yang, Zhu & Li, 2010

= Thubana felinaurita =

Species of moth

Thubana felinaurita is a species of moth of the family Lecithoceridae. It is found in Guangxi in China.

The wingspan is 20.5–21 mm.
