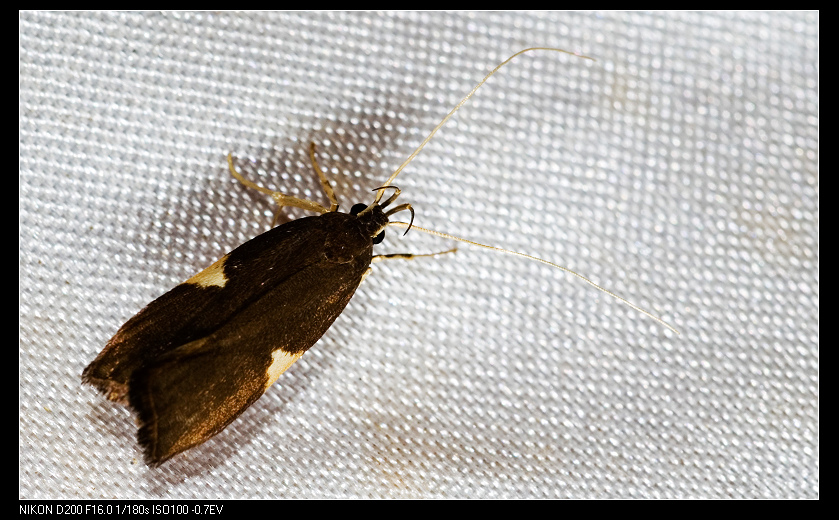

Scientific classification
- Kingdom: Animalia
- Phylum: Arthropoda
- Clade: Pancrustacea
- Class: Insecta
- Order: Lepidoptera
- Family: Lecithoceridae
- Genus: Thubana
- Species: T. deltaspis

Binomial name
- Thubana deltaspis Meyrick, 1935

= Thubana deltaspis =

Species of moth

Thubana deltaspis is a moth in the family Lecithoceridae. It is found in Taiwan and in Fujian, China.
