= Thubana costimaculella =

Scientific classification
- Kingdom: Animalia
- Phylum: Arthropoda
- Clade: Pancrustacea
- Class: Insecta
- Order: Lepidoptera
- Family: Lecithoceridae
- Genus: Thubana
- Species: T. costimaculella

Binomial name
- Thubana costimaculella (Snellen, 1903)

Synonyms
- Lecithocera costimaculella Snellen, 1903

Species of moth

Thubana costimaculella is a moth in the family Lecithoceridae. It is found on Java and Sumatra, Indonesia.

The forewing lentgth is 9.5–10 mm (0.37–0.39 in). The wingspan is about 18 mm. The forewings are purplish brown with an ochreous-yellow dot at the base and an ochreous-yellow triangular area at the margin. The hindwings are greyish brown.
