= Thubana kinabaluensis =

Scientific classification
- Kingdom: Animalia
- Phylum: Arthropoda
- Clade: Pancrustacea
- Class: Insecta
- Order: Lepidoptera
- Family: Lecithoceridae
- Genus: Thubana
- Species: T. kinabaluensis

Binomial name
- Thubana kinabaluensis Park & Sugisima, 2005

Species of moth

Thubana kinabaluensis is a moth in the family Lecithoceridae. It was described by Kyu-Tek Park and Kazuhiro Sugisima in 2005. It is known from the eponymous Mount Kinabalu in Malaysian Borneo and from Sumatra, Indonesia.

The forewing length is 8.5–9 mm (0.33–0.35 in).
