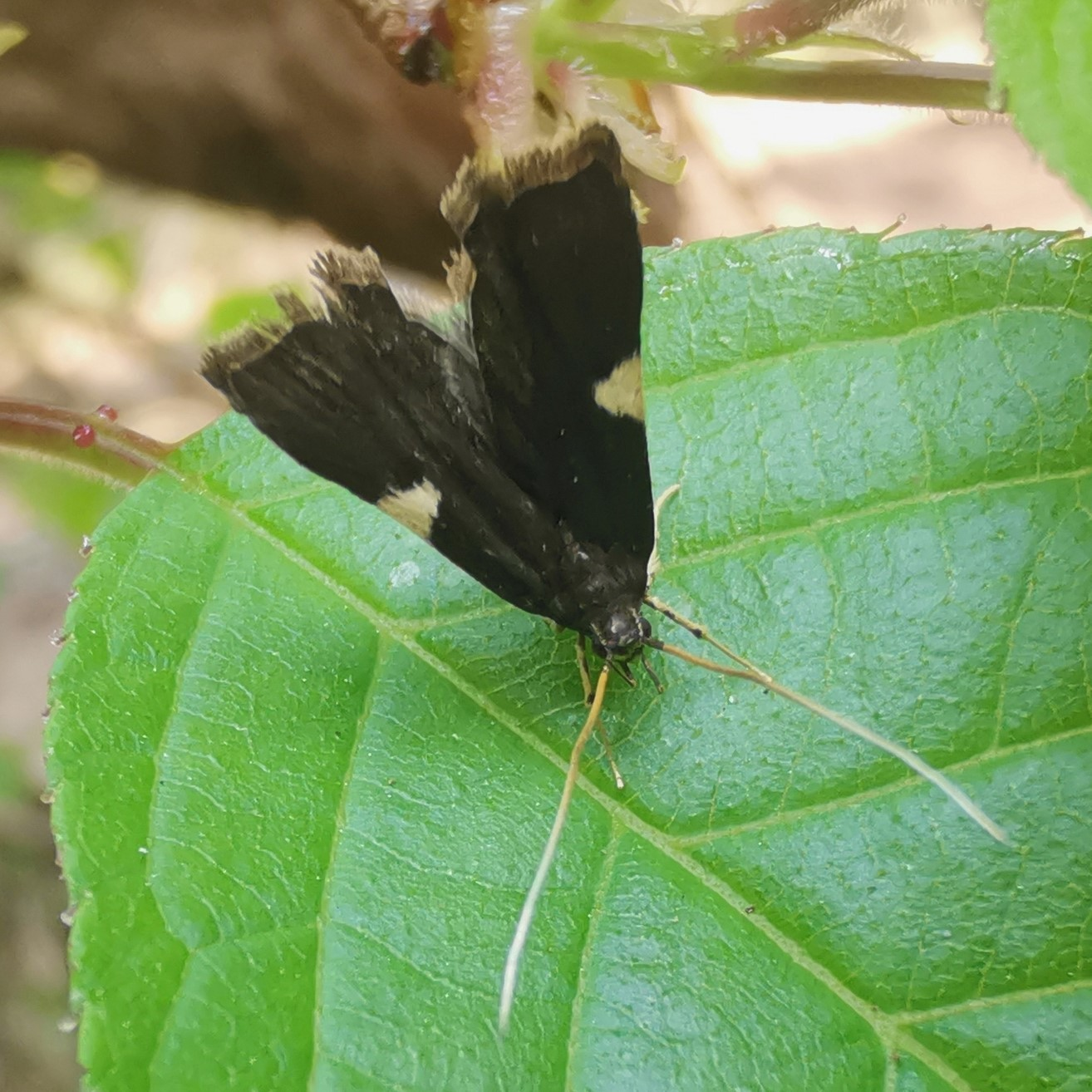

Scientific classification
- Kingdom: Animalia
- Phylum: Arthropoda
- Clade: Pancrustacea
- Class: Insecta
- Order: Lepidoptera
- Family: Lecithoceridae
- Genus: Thubana
- Species: T. ochrodelta

Binomial name
- Thubana ochrodelta Park, 2003

= Thubana ochrodelta =

Species of moth

Thubana ochrodelta is a species of moth in the family Lecithoceridae. It was described by Kyu-Tek Park in 2003. It is found in Thailand.

The wingspan is 15–17 mm (0.59–0.67 in).
