= Thubana chanthaburiensis =

Scientific classification
- Kingdom: Animalia
- Phylum: Arthropoda
- Clade: Pancrustacea
- Class: Insecta
- Order: Lepidoptera
- Family: Lecithoceridae
- Genus: Thubana
- Species: T. chanthaburiensis

Binomial name
- Thubana chanthaburiensis Park, 2003

Species of moth

Thubana chanthaburiensis is a moth in the family Lecithoceridae. It was described by Kyu-Tek Park in 2003. It is found in Thailand.

The wingspan is 17–19 mm (0.67–0.75 in).
