= Thubana raphidodea =

Scientific classification
- Kingdom: Animalia
- Phylum: Arthropoda
- Clade: Pancrustacea
- Class: Insecta
- Order: Lepidoptera
- Family: Lecithoceridae
- Genus: Thubana
- Species: T. raphidodea

Binomial name
- Thubana raphidodea Park & Heppner, 2009

Species of moth

Thubana raphidodea is a moth in the family Lecithoceridae. It was described by Kyu-Tek Park and John B. Heppner in 2009. It is known from Sulawesi in Indonesia and from Perak in Peninsular Malaysia.

The forewing length is 10.5–11.0 mm (0.41–0.43 in).
