= Thubana xylogramma =

Scientific classification
- Kingdom: Animalia
- Phylum: Arthropoda
- Clade: Pancrustacea
- Class: Insecta
- Order: Lepidoptera
- Family: Lecithoceridae
- Genus: Thubana
- Species: T. xylogramma

Binomial name
- Thubana xylogramma (Meyrick, 1922)

Synonyms
- Lecithocera xylogramma Meyrick, 1922

Species of moth

Thubana xylogramma is a moth in the family Lecithoceridae. It was described by Edward Meyrick in 1922. It is found on Java in Indonesia. Only female is known.

The wingspan is about 21 mm. The forewings are pale ochreous yellowish, the veins suffusedly lined with fuscous and with a moderate streak of fuscous suffusion along the costa from the base to near the middle. The discal stigmata is represented by fuscous spots, the first roundish, the second transverse, a subtriangular patch of fuscous suffusion extending from the second to the costa between veins 9 to 11. The hindwings are ochreous whitish with a grey transverse spot on the end of the cell and a grey terminal line.
