= Thubana exoema =

Scientific classification
- Kingdom: Animalia
- Phylum: Arthropoda
- Clade: Pancrustacea
- Class: Insecta
- Order: Lepidoptera
- Family: Lecithoceridae
- Genus: Thubana
- Species: T. exoema

Binomial name
- Thubana exoema (Meyrick, 1911)

Synonyms
- Pachnistis exoema Meyrick, 1911

Species of moth

Thubana exoema is a moth in the family Lecithoceridae. It was described by Edward Meyrick in 1911. It is found in Sri Lanka.

== Description ==
The wingspan is 13–17 mm. The forewings are dark purplish-fuscous with a pale whitish-ochreous cloudy rather irregular streak crossing the wing before the middle and small whitish-ochreous costal and dorsal spots at four-fifths. The hindwings are pale grey, darker posteriorly.
