= Thubana albisignis =

Scientific classification
- Kingdom: Animalia
- Phylum: Arthropoda
- Clade: Pancrustacea
- Class: Insecta
- Order: Lepidoptera
- Family: Lecithoceridae
- Genus: Thubana
- Species: T. albisignis

Binomial name
- Thubana albisignis (Meyrick, 1914)

Synonyms
- Lecithocera albisignis Meyrick, 1914

Species of moth

Thubana albisignis is a moth in the family Lecithoceridae. It is found in Taiwan. It has a wingspan of about 15–16 mm.
