= Thubana spinata =

Scientific classification
- Kingdom: Animalia
- Phylum: Arthropoda
- Class: Insecta
- Order: Lepidoptera
- Family: Lecithoceridae
- Genus: Thubana
- Species: T. spinata

Binomial name
- Thubana spinata Park & Sugisima, 2005

Species of moth

Thubana spinata is a moth in the family Lecithoceridae. It was described by Kyu-Tek Park and Kazuhiro Sugisima in 2005. It is found on Borneo.
