= Thubana cherandra =

Scientific classification
- Kingdom: Animalia
- Phylum: Arthropoda
- Class: Insecta
- Order: Lepidoptera
- Family: Lecithoceridae
- Genus: Thubana
- Species: T. cherandra

Binomial name
- Thubana cherandra (Meyrick, 1906)

Synonyms
- Brachmia cherandra Meyrick, 1906

Species of moth

Thubana cherandra is a moth in the family Lecithoceridae. It was described by Edward Meyrick in 1906. It is found in Sri Lanka.

The wingspan is about 20 mm. The forewings are dark fuscous, purplish tinged and the stigmata are small, faintly darker, with the plical beneath the first discal, edged posteriorly by a minute grey-whitish dot. There are ochreous-yellowish subtriangular dots on the costa at two-fifths and four-fifths, and on the dorsum near the tornus. The hindwings are grey.
