= Thubana isocrypta =

Scientific classification
- Domain: Eukaryota
- Kingdom: Animalia
- Phylum: Arthropoda
- Class: Insecta
- Order: Lepidoptera
- Family: Lecithoceridae
- Genus: Thubana
- Species: T. isocrypta

Binomial name
- Thubana isocrypta (Meyrick, 1911)

Synonyms
- Brachmia isocrypta Meyrick, 1911

Species of moth

Thubana isocrypta is a moth in the family Lecithoceridae. It was described by Edward Meyrick in 1911. It is found in Sri Lanka.

The wingspan is about 15 mm. The forewings are rather dark fuscous. The second discal stigma is obscurely darker and there is a cloudy fuscous-whitish dot on the costa at three-fourths, where a very faintly indicated very obtusely angulated pale line runs to the dorsum before the tornus. The hindwings are grey.
