= Thubana gyrostigmatis =

Scientific classification
- Kingdom: Animalia
- Phylum: Arthropoda
- Clade: Pancrustacea
- Class: Insecta
- Order: Lepidoptera
- Family: Lecithoceridae
- Genus: Thubana
- Species: T. gyrostigmatis

Binomial name
- Thubana gyrostigmatis Park, 2009

Species of moth

Thubana gyrostigmatis is a moth in the family Lecithoceridae. It was described by Kyu-Tek Park in 2009. It is found on Luzon in the Philippines.
