= Thubana laxata =

Scientific classification
- Kingdom: Animalia
- Phylum: Arthropoda
- Class: Insecta
- Order: Lepidoptera
- Family: Lecithoceridae
- Genus: Thubana
- Species: T. laxata

Binomial name
- Thubana laxata (Meyrick, 1911)

Synonyms
- Brachmia laxata Meyrick, 1911

Species of moth

Thubana laxata is a moth in the family Lecithoceridae. It was described by Edward Meyrick in 1911. It is found in Assam, India.

The wingspan is 18–22 mm. The forewings are dark purple-fuscous with a large irregular patch of darker suffusion resting on the dorsum before the middle, sometimes followed by more or less extensive pale ochreous suffusion in the disc and towards the dorsum, the plical and first discal stigmata are sometimes indicated on the margin of this patch. The second discal stigma and an additional spot beneath it are distinct in paler-suffused specimens, or confluent and obscure in darker ones. There are wedge-shaped pale yellow-ochreous costal and dorsal marks near the termen, sometimes connected by a faint curved line. The hindwings are fuscous.
