= Thubana nodosa =

Scientific classification
- Kingdom: Animalia
- Phylum: Arthropoda
- Class: Insecta
- Order: Lepidoptera
- Family: Lecithoceridae
- Genus: Thubana
- Species: T. nodosa

Binomial name
- Thubana nodosa (Meyrick, 1910)

Synonyms
- Lecithocera leucochlora Meyrick, 1910

Species of moth

Thubana nodosa is a moth in the family Lecithoceridae. It was described by Edward Meyrick in 1910. It is found in Malaysia.

The wingspan is about 18 mm. The forewings are dark fuscous with some pale ochreous-yellowish suffusion towards the costa near the base and before the apex, as well as a pale ochreous-yellowish median fascia, the lower half narrow, the upper half enlarged into a quadrate blotch, the lower portion of this blotch marked with a dark fuscous dot and small transverse posterior spot. The hindwings are dark fuscous.
