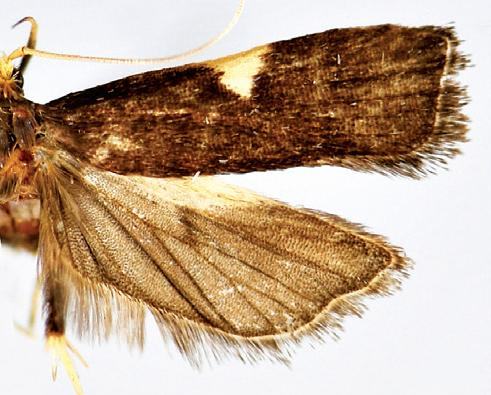

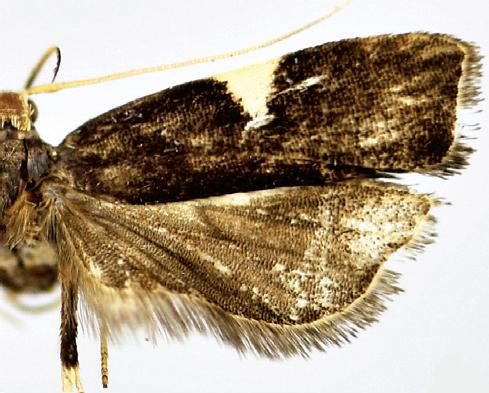

Scientific classification
- Kingdom: Animalia
- Phylum: Arthropoda
- Clade: Pancrustacea
- Class: Insecta
- Order: Lepidoptera
- Family: Lecithoceridae
- Genus: Thubana
- Species: T. leucosphena

Binomial name
- Thubana leucosphena Meyrick, 1931

Synonyms
- Thubana microcera Gozmány, 1978; Thubana loxosphanta Meyrick (manuscript name)

= Thubana leucosphena =

Species of moth

Thubana leucosphena is a species of moth of the family Lecithoceridae. It is found in southern China (Anhui, Fujian, Jiangxi, Henan, Hunan, Hubei, Guizhou and Zhejiang), Thailand, and Vietnam.

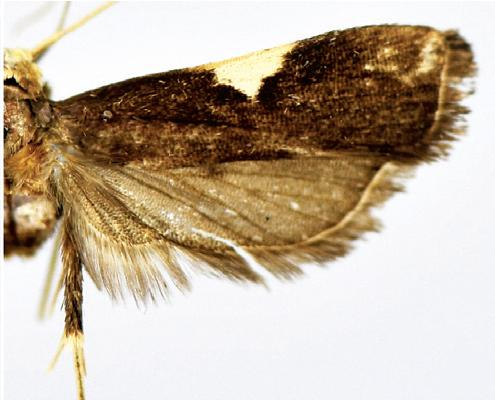

The wingspan is about 18.5 mm (0.73 in) for females.
