= Thubana kurokoi =

Scientific classification
- Kingdom: Animalia
- Phylum: Arthropoda
- Clade: Pancrustacea
- Class: Insecta
- Order: Lepidoptera
- Family: Lecithoceridae
- Genus: Thubana
- Species: T. kurokoi

Binomial name
- Thubana kurokoi Park, 2003

Species of moth

Thubana kurokoi is a moth in the family Lecithoceridae. It was described by Kyu-Tek Park in 2003. It is found in Thailand. It is named for Hiroshi Kuroko.

The wingspan is 13.5–18.5 mm (0.53–0.73 in).
