= Thubana bathrocera =

Scientific classification
- Kingdom: Animalia
- Phylum: Arthropoda
- Clade: Pancrustacea
- Class: Insecta
- Order: Lepidoptera
- Family: Lecithoceridae
- Genus: Thubana
- Species: T. bathrocera

Binomial name
- Thubana bathrocera Wu, 1997

Species of moth

Thubana bathrocera is a moth in the family Lecithoceridae. It was described by Chun-Sheng Wu in 1997. It is found in Hunan, China.
