= Thubana gilvizonaris =

Scientific classification
- Kingdom: Animalia
- Phylum: Arthropoda
- Clade: Pancrustacea
- Class: Insecta
- Order: Lepidoptera
- Family: Lecithoceridae
- Genus: Thubana
- Species: T. gilvizonaris

Binomial name
- Thubana gilvizonaris Park, 2013

Species of moth

Thubana gilvizonaris is a moth in the family Lecithoceridae. It was described by Kyu-Tek Park in 2013. It is found on Borneo.

The wingspan is 20–21 mm.

== Etymology ==
The species name refers to the pale yellowish costal patch of the forewing and is derived from Latin gilv (meaning 'pale yellow').
