= Thubana circularis =

Scientific classification
- Kingdom: Animalia
- Phylum: Arthropoda
- Clade: Pancrustacea
- Class: Insecta
- Order: Lepidoptera
- Family: Lecithoceridae
- Genus: Thubana
- Species: T. circularis

Binomial name
- Thubana circularis Park, 2006

Species of moth

Thubana circularis is a moth in the family Lecithoceridae. It was described by Kyu-Tek Park in 2006. It is found in Vietnam.
