= Thubana residua =

Scientific classification
- Kingdom: Animalia
- Phylum: Arthropoda
- Class: Insecta
- Order: Lepidoptera
- Family: Lecithoceridae
- Genus: Thubana
- Species: T. residua

Binomial name
- Thubana residua (Meyrick, 1923)

Synonyms
- Lecithocera residua Meyrick, 1923

Species of moth

Thubana residua is a moth in the family Lecithoceridae. It was described by Edward Meyrick in 1923. It is found in Assam, India.

The wingspan is about 23 mm. The forewings are ochreous grey whitish, slightly grey sprinkled and with an irregular semi-oval purplish-fuscous blotch extending along the dorsum from near the base to three-fifths, the edge prominent at two-fifths, where it reaches three-fourths of the way across the wing. The dorsal three-fifths from this to the termen is mixed with light grey suffusion and irregularly sprinkled with darker fuscous, with two or three small spots in the disc beyond the middle. There is a dark fuscous marginal line around the termen and tornus and extending a little way up the fold. The hindwings are pale whitish grey.
