= Keo Seima Wildlife Sanctuary =

Protected area in eastern Cambodia

- ដែនជម្រកសត្វព្រៃកែវសីមា (previously Seima Protection Forest, Seima Biodiversity Conservation Area)
- Location within Cambodia
- Location: Cambodia
- Nearest city: Senmonorom
- Coordinates: 12.335611°N 106.842095°E
- Area: 2,926.9 km^{2} (1,130.1 sq mi)
- Established: 12 August 2002
- Governing body: Ministry of Environment

Keo Seima Wildlife Sanctuary (Khmer: ដែនជម្រកសត្វព្រៃកែវសីមា) is a 2,926.9 km^{2} (1,130.1 sq mi) protected area of mixed seasonal tropical forest in eastern Cambodia, located in Mondulkiri and Kratié provinces. The area was first established as Seima Biodiversity Conservation Area in 2002, later becoming Seima Protection Forest in 2009, finally becoming Keo Seima Wildlife Sanctuary in 2016. The site is of national, regional, and global importance for a range of biodiversity, with more than 950 species recorded within the protected area. It is also the ancestral and contemporary home of a large number of the Bunong ethnic group.

== Landscape and climate ==
Keo Seima Wildlife Sanctuary (KSWS) lies between 60 and 750 metres (200 and 2,460 ft) above sea level, and is situated in the southeast corner of Cambodia along the border with Vietnam. The northwest section of KSWS forms part of Cambodia's Eastern Plains, while the montane southeast section constitutes the south-western edge of the Annamite Range range along the Sen Monorom plateau. Major habitat types found within the protected area include tropical evergreen, mixed deciduous, semi-evergreen and deciduous Dipterocarp forest.

As in much of Cambodia, two main seasons predominate in KSWS: tropical wet and dry. During the wet season, which runs between April and October, the area receives an average of 2,200–2,800 millimetres (87–110 in) of rainfall. Temperatures range annually from 16 to 36 °C (61 to 97 °F).

The protected area covers part of the Prek Te, and a large part of the Prek Chhlong watersheds, providing ecosystem services to residential and agricultural areas.

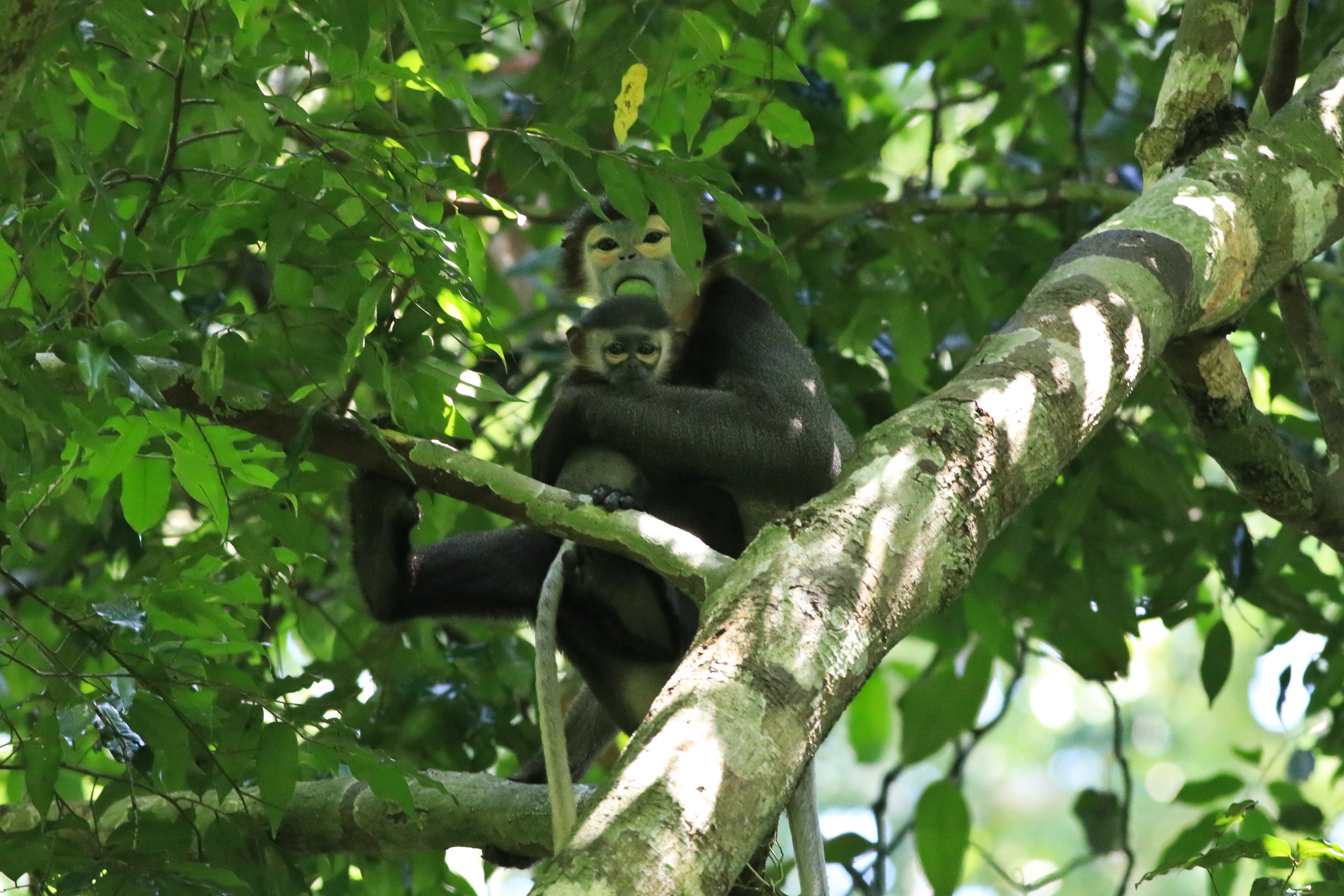
KSWS holds the world's largest population of the black-shanked douc langur, Pygathrix nigripes, estimated at 25,000 individuals.

== Biodiversity ==
Mixed forest types and a range of elevation gives rise to a rich collection of biodiversity, both flora and fauna. A total of 959 plant, fungi, and animal species have been recorded in the area, the highest reported number for any Cambodian protected area. A total of 356 bird species have been recorded, exceeding the highest number recorded on eBird for any site in Cambodia and with at least 21 Picidae species, KSWS has one of the highest global diversities of any site.

Seven primate species are found in the protected area, including the vast majority of the world's population of the black-shanked douc langur, with an estimated 25,000 individuals. The next largest population, found in Vietnam, is only 500 individuals. A total of 1,432 southern yellow-cheeked crested gibbon are found in the evergreen and semi-evergreen forest areas, including the world's only habituated groups of this species, at Jahoo Gibbon Camp.

Significant threatened ungulate populations are present, including Eld's deer, sambar deer, banteng, and the largest living wild bovid, the gaur.

In 2016, the tiger was acknowledged as having been driven to extinction in Cambodia, and in KSWS the last record of tiger was from 2006.

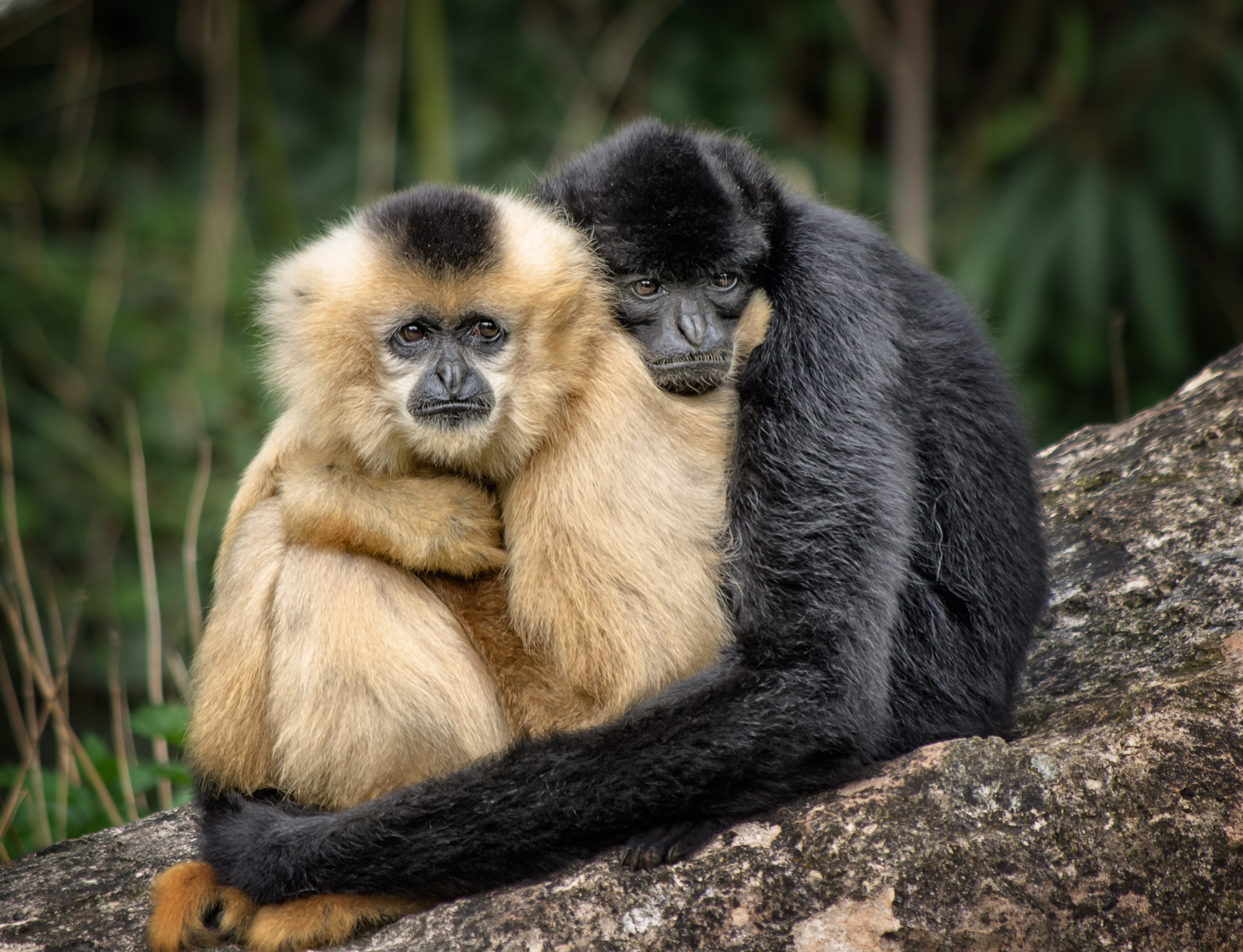
An estimated 1,400 yellow-cheeked crested gibbon, Nomascus gabriellae, live in KSWS, one of the largest populations of this endangered species.

At least 15 newly discovered species have been described from KSWS (the type locality); two mammals, two amphibians, two reptiles, and nine insects:

- Titania's woolly bat (Kerivoula titania)
- Indochinese thick-thumbed bat (Glischropus bucephalus)
- O'Reang horned frog (កង្កែបស្នែងអូររាំង, Ophryophryne synoria)
- Mouhot's litter frog (កង្កែបស្លឹកមួហួត, Leptobrachium mouhoti)
- Red-eyed green pit-viper (Trimeresurus rubeus)
- Scincella nigrofasciata, a skink species
- Cyana angkorensis, a moth species
- Naarda furcatella, a moth species
- Dichomeris hainanensis, a moth species
- Dichomeris magnimacularis, a moth species
- Thubana seimaensis, a moth species
- Promalactis apicuncata, a moth species
- Promalactis quadrilobata, a moth species
- Promalactis seimana, a moth species
- Tanna kimtaewooi, a cicada species

A total of 75 threatened species (classified as Critically endangered, Endangered, or Vulnerable on the IUCN Red List) have been recorded as present at the site, as well as 106 CITES listed species, and 46 species listed as Endangered or Rare under Cambodian law. A total of 28 EDGE species are found within KSWS, seven species of which are in the global top 100 for their taxonomic group.

=== National, regional, and global importance ===
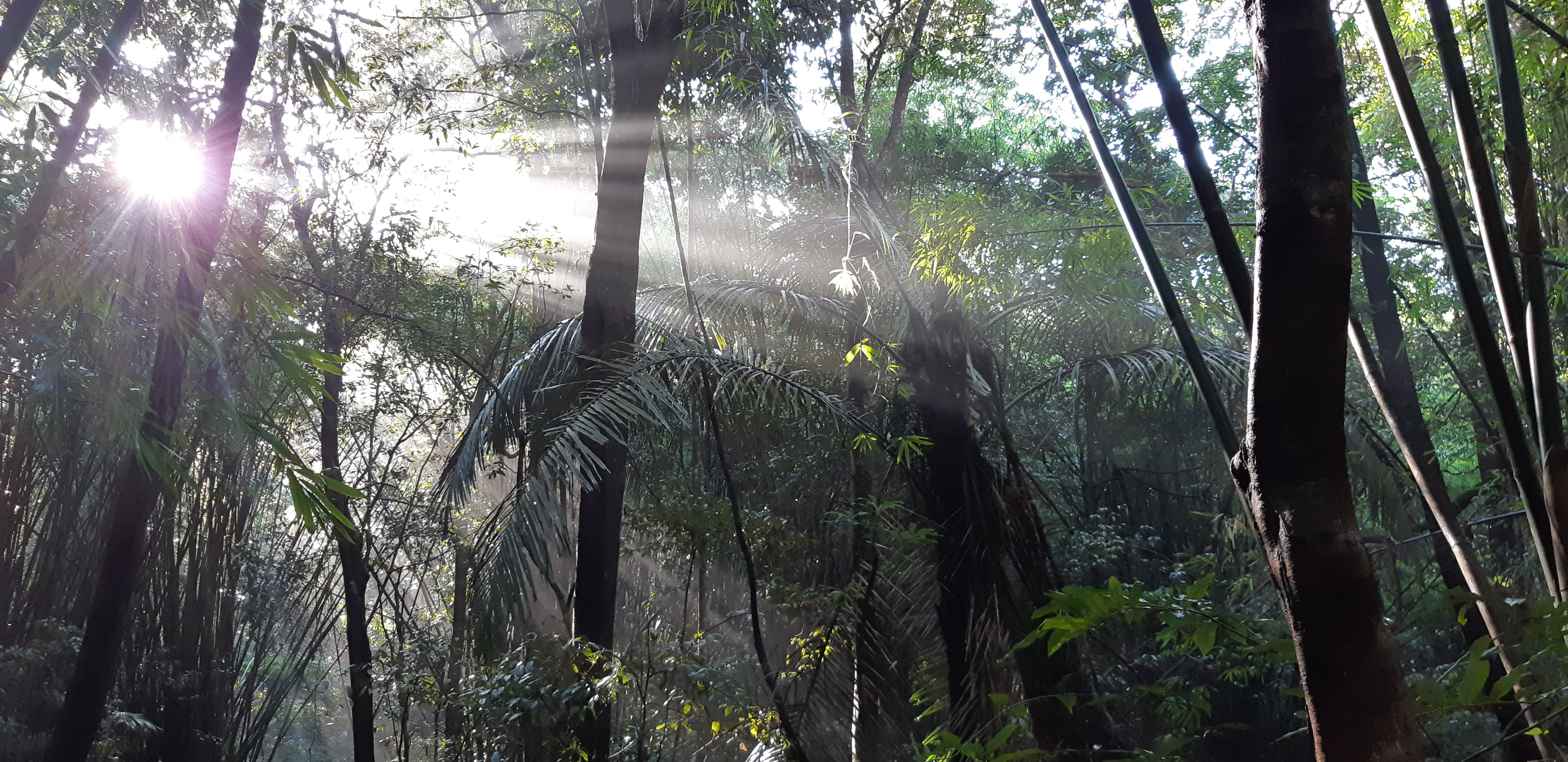
Mixed bamboo and semi-evergreen forest in the sanctuary

In addition to having the highest number of species recorded in any Cambodian protected area, KSWS has been highlighted as an area of biodiversity importance under a range of prioritization frameworks.

==== Climate, Community & Biodiversity Alliance ====
The Keo Seima REDD+ project qualifies under the Climate, Community & Biodiversity (CCB) Standards Gold Level for biodiversity under both vulnerability and irreplaceability criteria.

==== Biodiversity hotspot ====
Under the framework developed by Conservation International, KSWS forms part of the Indo-Burma Biodiversity hotspot.

==== Endemic Bird Area (EBA), Important Bird Area (IBA) ====
The protected area forms part of the EBA 144, South Vietnam Lowlands Endemic Bird Area, recognized for its breeding populations of three restricted-range bird species that characterize the EBA: Germain's peacock-pheasant, Orange-necked partridge and Grey-faced tit-babbler.

KSWS is also covered parts of two Important Bird Areas: KH026 (the Mondulkiri - Kratie Lowlands) and KH027 (Snoul / Keo Sema / O Reang). These are prioritized for conservation of Orange-necked partridge, Siamese fireback, Green peafowl, White-winged duck, and Great hornbill, and for vultures, ibises, sarus crane and green peafowl.

==== Global 200 ====
Under the Global 200 priority ecoregions for global conservation, KSWS is included in two areas:

- Indochina Dry Forests, ecoregion 54. Critical or Endangered.
- Annamite Range Moist Forests, ecoregion 25. Vulnerable.

==== Last of the Wild ====
KSWS is included as one of the 569 Last of the Wild areas globally that in 1992 - 1995 were found to have been least affected by human activities, and again included in the v2 2004 update. These areas are:

- Southeastern Indochina dry evergreen forests
- Central Indochina dry forests

==== High Conservation Value Forest ====
During development of the REDD+ project a number of high conservation values were identified:

- HCV1: Forest areas containing globally, regionally or nationally significant concentrations of biodiversity values
  - HCV 1.1: Protected Areas
  - HCV 1.2: Threatened and Endangered Species
  - HCV 1.3: Endemic Species
- HCV2: Forest areas containing globally, regionally or nationally significant large landscape level forests
- HCV3: Forest areas that are in or contain rare, threatened or endangered ecosystems

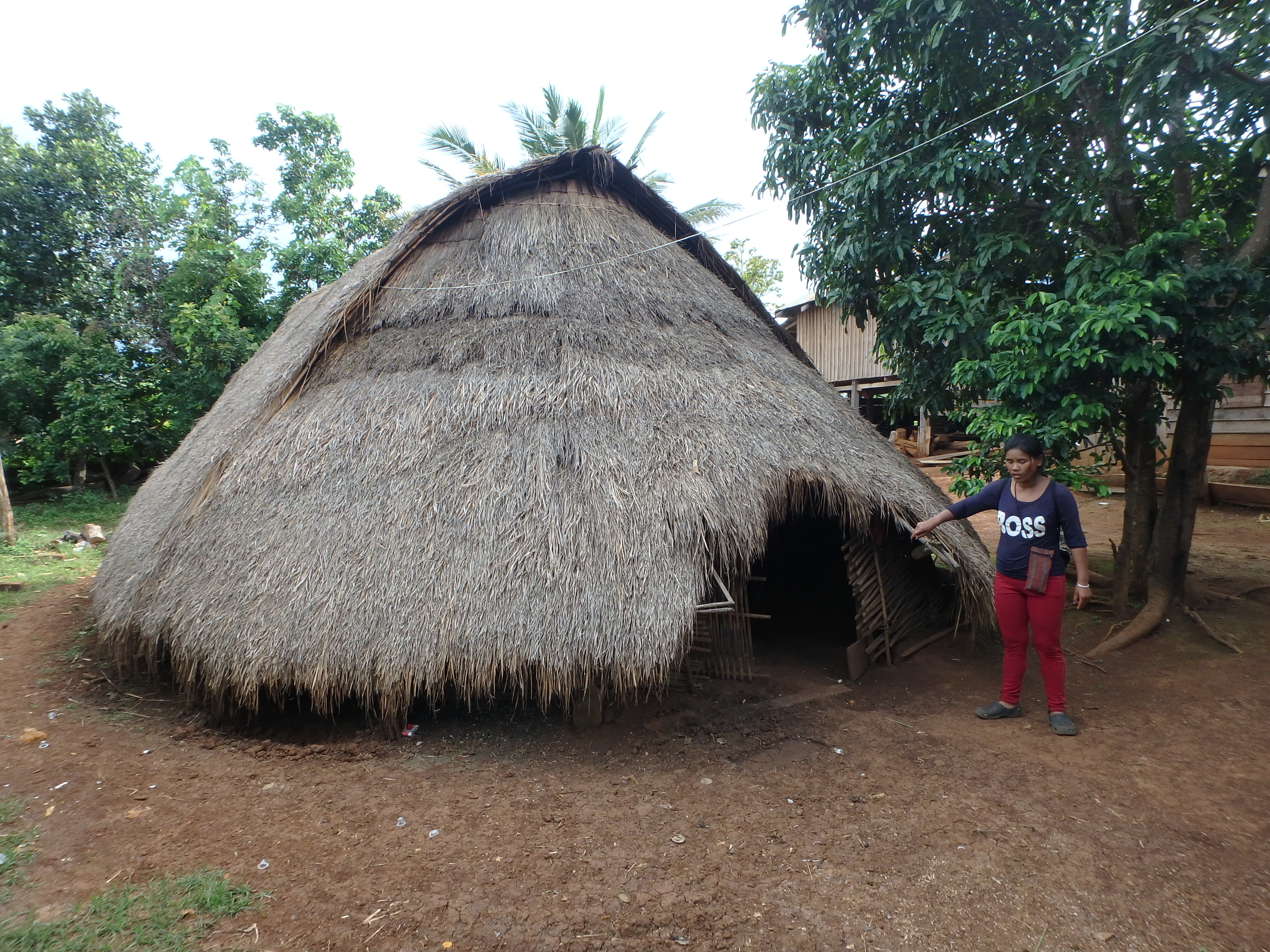
Traditional Bunong house

== Communities ==
Unusually for a protected area in Cambodia, KSWS is home to a large human population, predominately of the Bunong ethnic group. A traditionally Animist group, forests play a large role in community identity. In March 2012, Andoung Kraloeng village in KSWS became the first Indigenous community in Mondulkiri Province, and third nationally, to receive a collective land title under the 2001 Land Law. Since then, a total of 11 indigenous communities have been awarded legal rights to their traditional land within KSWS, facilitated by the Wildlife Conservation Society and the KSWS project. These titles have already proved vital for communities, allowing them to resist illegal land grabs, with one precedent-setting case reaching the high courts.

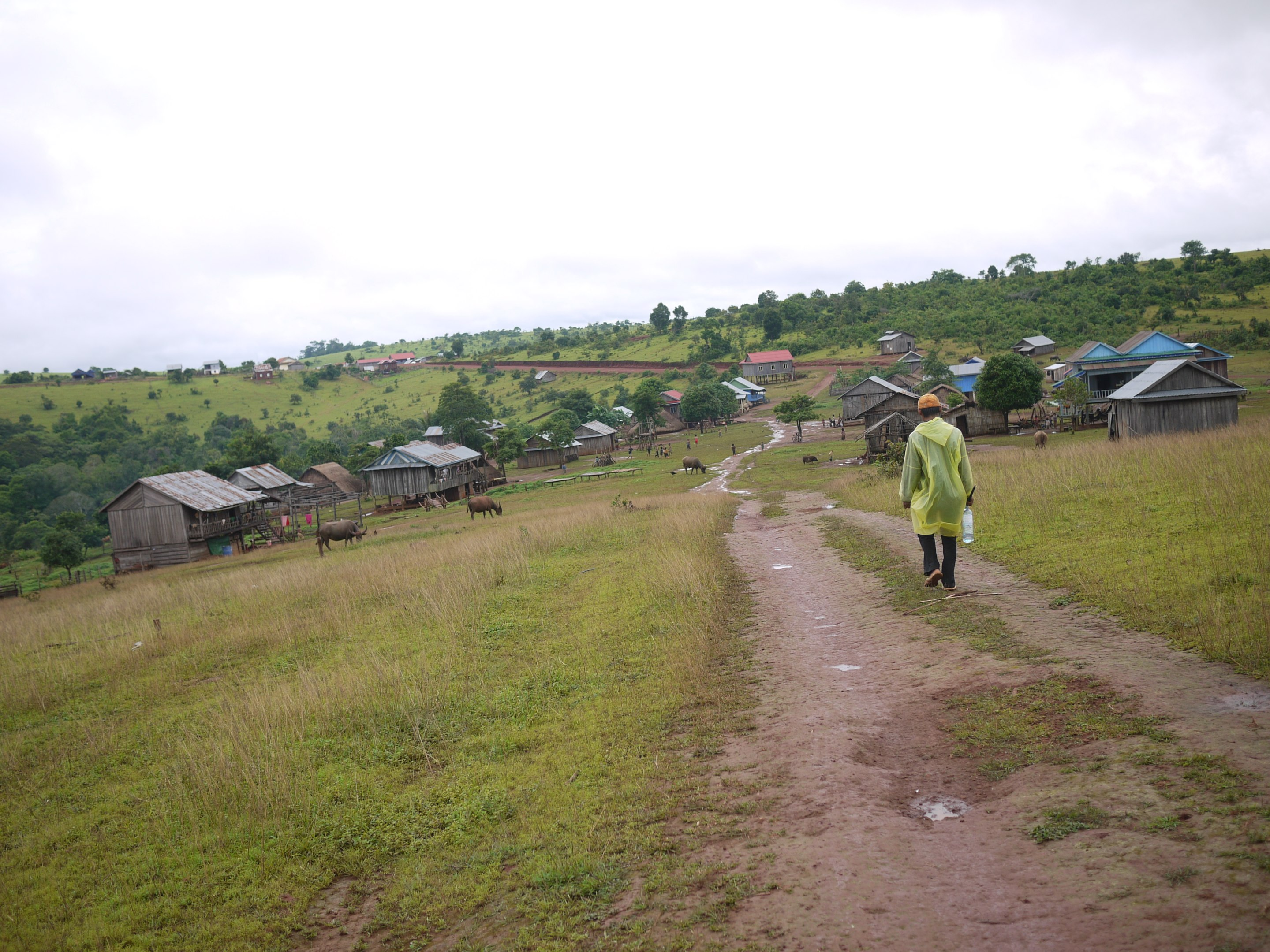
Approaching a Bunong village in Mondulkiri Province.

Rural livelihoods in the area are typically based on agriculture and forest use, including rain-fed rice paddy, cassava, cashew, rubber and resin tapping from Dipterocarpus species, Dipterocarpus alatus and Dipterocarpus intricatus.

Mondulkiri Province has one of the highest population growth rates in Cambodia.

== Management ==
From first establishment in 2002 until 2016, the site was under management by the Forestry Administration, part of the Ministry of Agriculture, Forestry and Fisheries of the Royal Government of Cambodia. In 2016, all protected areas under management of the Forestry Administration, including what was then Seima Protection Forest, were transferred to management by the Ministry of Environment and the sub-national Departments of Environment for Mondulkiri and Kratié provinces. The area has been supported by the Wildlife Conservation Society since its inception providing technical and financial support across the site. A number of other NGOs support projects and communities throughout KSWS, including World Hope International supporting Jahoo Gibbon Camp in Andoung Kraloeng village, and the Elephant Livelihoods Initiative Environment (E.L.I.E.) supporting the Elephant Valley Project (EVP) in Pu Trom village.

=== REDD+ project ===
The majority of KSWS is included in a REDD+ project that is the largest carbon emission reduction program in Cambodia's land use sector. The project was the second demonstration site in Cambodia, following the development of the Oddar Meanchey Community Forest REDD+ (OM CF REDD+). Over the 10-year period from 2010 the project is predicted to avoid 17.4 million tons of CO_{2}-e emissions, equivalent to 4 million passenger vehicles or 4 coal-fired power stations.

The project was the first initiative in Cambodia to use an extensive free, prior and informed consent process with independent legal advice, and local communities from 20 villages in and around the protected area have signed agreements to join the KSWS REDD+ project and receive a proportion of profits from the sale of carbon credits.

== Threats ==
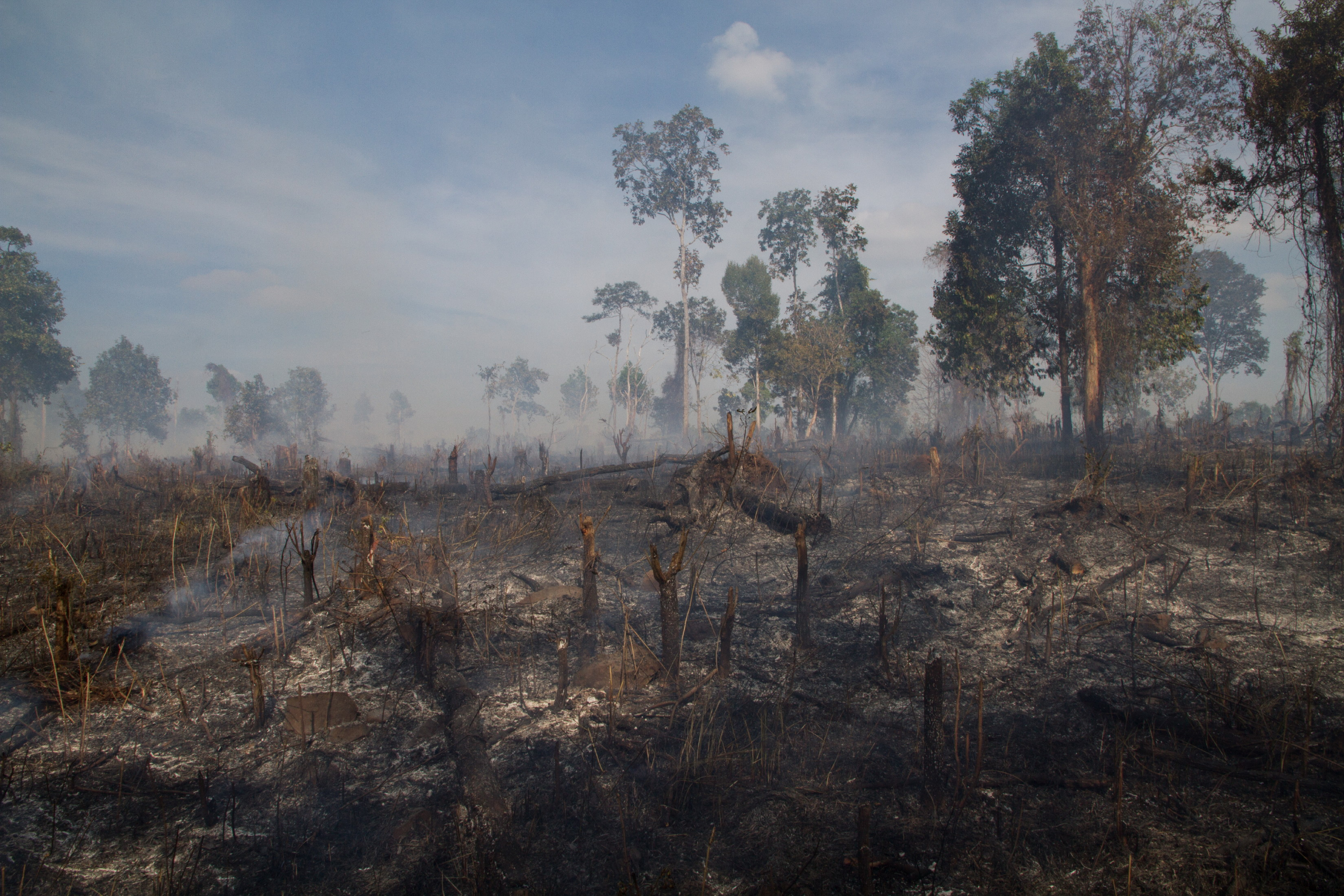
Illegal deforestation in Mondulkiri Province, Cambodia

Large-scale development projects are under active development, with more planned in the landscape, including mining concessions, active economic land concessions for rubber, new roads, and power transmission lines. Economic Land Concessions (ELC) granted within the protected area and activated between 2010 and 2014 led to the loss of more than 20,000 ha of forest within the protected area, with additional leakage around the ELC boundaries. Renaissance Minerals, owned entirely by Australian Emerald Resources, have two gold exploration licenses that fall entirely within the protected area and the adjacent protected area, Phnom Prich Wildlife Sanctuary. KSWS shares its eastern border with Vietnam, and cross-border trade contributes to illegal logging of high value timber species. Migration from other provinces and local demand for expanding farming land continues to drive conversion of forest to agriculture in areas in close proximity to roads, existing agriculture, and markets.

Poaching with snares threatens many terrestrial species, with a young Asian elephant calf killed at the site in 2016. Populations of some other key species may be declining as a result of intensive snaring. Elephants are also threatened by agricultural encroachment, with one baby elephant killed in 2018 when becoming trapped in a hole left by the use of fire to illegally clear forest for agriculture, and 11 elephants becoming trapped in an irrigation pool in 2017; in this case, all 11 elephants were successfully rescued by local communities, local authorities, and NGOs including the Wildlife Conservation Society, World Wide Fund for Nature, the Elephant Valley Project.

== External ==
- Map of protected areas in Cambodia
