= Thubana pedicucullata =

Scientific classification
- Kingdom: Animalia
- Phylum: Arthropoda
- Clade: Pancrustacea
- Class: Insecta
- Order: Lepidoptera
- Family: Lecithoceridae
- Genus: Thubana
- Species: T. pedicucullata

Binomial name
- Thubana pedicucullata Park, 2009

Species of moth

Thubana pedicucullata is a moth in the family Lecithoceridae. It was described by Kyu-Tek Park in 2009. It is found in Palawan in the Philippines.
