= Thubana quadrata =

Scientific classification
- Kingdom: Animalia
- Phylum: Arthropoda
- Class: Insecta
- Order: Lepidoptera
- Family: Lecithoceridae
- Genus: Thubana
- Species: T. quadrata

Binomial name
- Thubana quadrata Park & Abang, 2005

Species of moth

Thubana quadrata is a moth in the family Lecithoceridae. It was described by Kyu-Tek Park and Fatimah Abang in 2005. It is found on Borneo.
