= Thubana heylaertsi =

Scientific classification
- Kingdom: Animalia
- Phylum: Arthropoda
- Clade: Pancrustacea
- Class: Insecta
- Order: Lepidoptera
- Family: Lecithoceridae
- Genus: Thubana
- Species: T. heylaertsi

Binomial name
- Thubana heylaertsi (Snellen, 1903)

Synonyms
- Lecithocera heylaertsi Snellen, 1903

Species of moth

Thubana heylaertsi is a moth in the family Lecithoceridae. It is found on Java, Indonesia.

The forewing lentgth is 8.5–9.5 mm (0.33–0.37 in). The wingspan is 17–18 mm. The forewings are dark brown with dark yellow markings. The hindwings are blackish-grey with a round yellow mark at the tip, marked by a black fleck.
