= Thubana melitopyga =

Scientific classification
- Kingdom: Animalia
- Phylum: Arthropoda
- Class: Insecta
- Order: Lepidoptera
- Family: Lecithoceridae
- Genus: Thubana
- Species: T. melitopyga

Binomial name
- Thubana melitopyga (Meyrick, 1923)

Synonyms
- Lecithocera melitopyga Meyrick, 1923

Species of moth

Thubana melitopyga is a moth in the family Lecithoceridae. It was described by Edward Meyrick in 1923. It is found in Sri Lanka.

The wingspan is about 18 mm. The forewings are dark purple grey and the hindwings are dark grey.
