= Lecithocera adelella =

Scientific classification
- Kingdom: Animalia
- Phylum: Arthropoda
- Clade: Pancrustacea
- Class: Insecta
- Order: Lepidoptera
- Family: Lecithoceridae
- Genus: Lecithocera
- Species: L. adelella

Binomial name
- Lecithocera adelella (Walker, 1864)

Synonyms
- Titana adelella Walker, 1864

Species of moth in genus Lecithocera

Lecithocera adelella is a moth in the family Lecithoceridae. It was described by Francis Walker in 1864. It is found on Borneo.

Adults are dark purplish, the forewings with a silvery white fringe. The hindwings are purplish cupreous.
