= Cabinet of Hun Manet =

Current government of Cambodia

- 7th Cabinet of Cambodia
- 2023–present
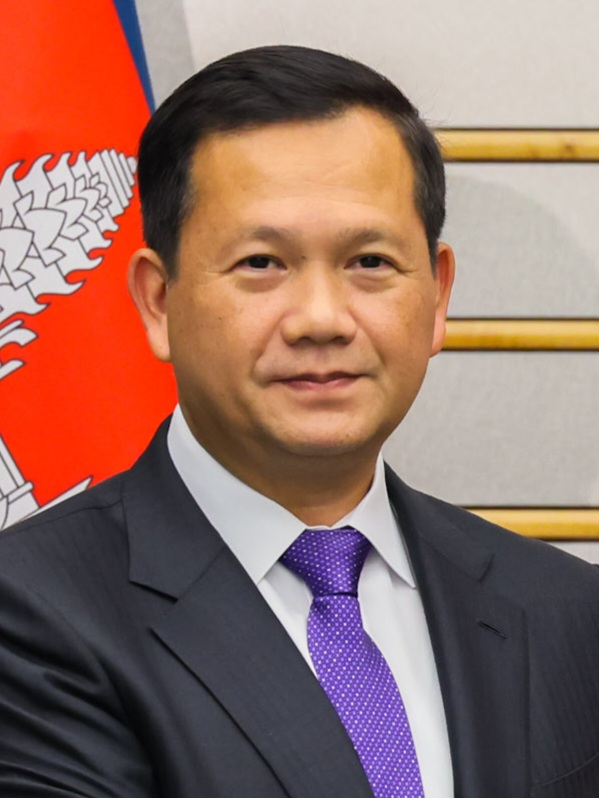
- Date formed: 22 August 2023

People and organisations
- Monarch: Norodom Sihamoni; Say Chhum (acting;c. March 2024); Hun Sen (acting;since February 2026)
- Prime Minister: Hun Manet
- Deputy Prime Ministers: See list: Aun Pornmoniroth; Vongsey Vissoth; Sar Sokha; Tea Seiha; Hangchuon Naron; Sok Chenda Sophea; Keut Rith; Say Sam Al; Sun Chanthol; Neth Savoeun; Hun Many (from 2024); Prak Sokhonn (from 2024)
- No. of ministers: 52 (1 PM, 10 Deputy PMs, 11 Senior Ministers, 30 Ministers)
- Total no. of members: 52
- Member party: Cambodian People's Party
- Status in legislature: Supermajority

History
- Election: 2023 Cambodian general election
- Legislature term: 7th National Assembly of Cambodia
- Budgets: 2024: 38 829 billion KHR (≈US$9.4 billion); 2025 (draft): 37 950 billion KHR (≈US$9.32 billion)
- Advice and consent: Senate
- Predecessor: Cabinet of Hun Sen

The 7th Council of Ministers was formed on 22 August 2023. It is led by Prime Minister Hun Manet, making it the first government in 38 years to not be led by Hun Sen, Manet's father, following his resignation. In addition, veteran politicians including Sar Kheng, Tea Banh and Men Sam An also relinquished their positions.

== Formation ==
On 26 July, Hun Sen announced on live television his resignation from the position of Prime Minister in a special message to the nation in favor of his son Hun Manet. On 7 August, King Norodom Sihamoni made the appointment in a royal decree signed, and Manet was named Prime Minister of Cambodia. The King also made another signed royal decree appointing Manet to organize the Council of Ministers for the Royal Government of the seventh mandate. The King made the appointment in a royal decree signed. According to the royal decree, the newly chosen prime minister is responsible for submitting the composition of the Cambodian government for a vote of confidence from the National Assembly, effective immediately. The 7th National Assembly held its first session on 21 August, nearly a month after its election on 23 July. The occasion will be presided over by the King, according to an announcement made by the National Assembly on August 11. The ceremony is being attended by senior officials, foreign embassies in Cambodia, and representatives from many non-governmental organizations. Following the opening ceremony, the first session will begin, presided over by Heng Samrin, to approve each NA member's mandate and the NA's internal regulations for the 7th mandate. On 22 August, the National Assembly will have a vote of confidence in the new government and continue the first session to elect a president, vice presidents, and leaders of the National Assembly's commissions.

Investiture Hun Manet (CPP)
Candidate →	Hun Manet
Ballot →	22 August 2023
Choice	Votes
Yes	123 / 125
Cambodian People's Party	118
FUNCINPEC	5
No	0 / 125
Abstentions	0 / 125
Absentees	2 / 125
Cambodian People's Party	2
Total votes	125
Required majority →	63 out of 125

== Term ==
=== Drugs ===
The cabinet shows consistent opposition towards the legalization and cultivation of marijuana in Cambodia. The Royal Government of Cambodia has turned down numerous requests from investors stating their plans to cultivate marijuana in the country under the guise of providing supplies to the medical field, such as rejecting Malaysian investors' request to grow marijuana in Kampong Speu. Despite the Royal Government of Cambodia's prohibition on marijuana production, some criminals have managed to grow the drug and have faced harsh punishment from law enforcement.

The cabinet supports a full crackdown in drug use, which can be seen in the government's strategy released on Thursday for the anti-drug campaigns in 2024. The government said that in order to maintain social safety, public order, and security, as well as to promote the development of youth resources and cultivate a more welcoming society, it will implement the drug war plan year-round. Neth Savoeun cited the increase in drug use among young people has given rise to grave worries about public safety, health, and order. These are important concerns that affect both the community and society as a whole.

=== Economic ===
According to a November 2023 World Bank projection, insufficient logistics and transport capabilities as well as an unstable energy supply will continue to drive up costs for consumers and enterprises in Cambodia. The world's declining demand as well as shocks to the prices of food and oil will make these problems much more severe.The Cambodian government is putting market expansion and diplomatic diversification of business ties first. Hun Manet's administration has engaged in unprecedented amounts of diplomacy with both new and old partners in the six months since assuming office. In addition to dispelling the myth that Cambodia is a Chinese client state, these initiatives are vital to diversify markets and promote export value and investment growth. Hun Manet has stated economic diversification, competitiveness enhancement, private sector development and employment, digital economy, social development, resilient and sustainable development and employment are the biggest economic priorities for this cabinet.

Hun Manet announced the official launch of the Pentagonal Strategy–Phase I and the key measures for the Royal Government of Cambodia (RGC) to be implemented in the next five years to transform Cambodia into a high-income economy by 2050. Referred to as a "forward-looking strategy for the next 25 years," Hun Manet stated that the Pentagonal Strategy will be implemented in five phases, each of which will be modified in accordance with the local, regional, and international circumstances. The strategy will be set out and carried out in accordance with the RGC's political platform for each legislation. In order to accelerate national development and reach the milestone of becoming an upper-middle-income country by 2030, as well as to advance towards the goal of becoming a high-income country by 2050—the Cambodia Vision 2050—the Pentagonal Strategy—Phase I will be implemented. Five strategic goals are outlined in the Pentagonal Strategy-Phase I. These goals include maintaining the GDP growth rate at a crisis-resilient average of roughly 7%, increasing the number of high-quality jobs, particularly for young people, achieving the goal of reducing poverty to below 10% of the population, enhancing governance capabilities, and ensuring climate change-resilient sustainable socioeconomic development. However, the Cambodian government projects 6.6% GDP growth in 2024 despite GDP predictions for 2023 falling short of expectations. In April 2023, the World Bank projected 5.4% growth, down from 5.8% growth, while the Asian Development Bank and the International Monetary Fund reduced their predictions for 2023 economic growth to 5.3% growth, down from 5.5% growth in May 2023. In addition to the nation's fundamental problems, poor productivity and competitiveness, a lack of economic diversification, and reliance on a restricted number of foreign markets, the minor adjustments were made in reaction to global geopolitical tensions and a global economic recession. The apparel industry does not support these kinds of changes. Although the industry is currently on life support (garment factories will receive a tax exemption till the end of 2025), Cambodia's economic vulnerability will only increase if it continues to rely on this industry. Garment manufacturing, which is mostly a cut, manufacture, and trim business using low-skilled labour, depends on the import of raw materials from other Asian nations, mainly China. It exports to the main economies, where under the EU's Everything But Arms programme, Cambodian goods have increasingly shaky preferential protection, and after being severely damaged by the COVID-19 pandemic, tourism is expected to recover and contribute to GDP as foreign arrivals—especially those from China start to rise. With 4.4 million foreign visitors arriving in the first ten months of 2023, Cambodia is seeing a rise in tourism from abroad. However, because the majority of travellers are low-spending tourists from nearby nations, the growing numbers have not produced the anticipated revenue. It is long past time for this industry to undergo a transformation, as agriculture directly supports about 70% of Cambodian households. In order to effectively serve Cambodia's export markets, the new strategic objectives support agribusiness. The shift to "smart farming" promotes high-value and locally processed Cambodian commodities rather than large-scale cash crops. Additionally, loans for agribusiness have been made available, and they are going to "economic poles" across the country. Due to all this economic problems, many economists believe that the face of global economic headwinds and structural economic challenges, will make it uncertain whether the Pentagonal Strategy will ever be realised.

=== Foreign Policy ===
After Hun Manet becoming the prime minister, a change in Cambodia's foreign policy agenda was also brought about by this change in leadership. Foreign policy under Hun Sen was seen as being closely associated with China, mainly depending on Chinese investments and subsidies for growth while upholding the legitimacy of the administration. Hun Manet must now take on the crucial duty of broadening Cambodia's foreign policy. To maximise gains domestically, he must foster positive connections with China while also building links with other countries, since Cambodia's independence and economic stability are at risk from an excessive reliance on any one nation. Hun Manet has held discussions with over 10 nations, forging new diplomatic relations with nations like Antigua & Barbuda, Liechtenstein, Uganda, Georgia, Canada, and the Netherlands. The approved fixed-asset investment projects in Cambodia for the first two months of 2024 amounted to US$1.39 billion, a phenomenal increase of over 500 percent when compared to the same period in 2023. These investments were drawn in large part by the Cambodia-China Free Trade Agreement and the Regional Comprehensive Economic Partnership.

==== Russia-Ukraine Conflict ====
The government and the ruling party has shown support for China's aggressive efforts at cross-border mediation to bring about a truce in Ukraine, praising China's initiative as a worthy example for the international community to advance talks. Hun Manet also reiterated the government's commitment to working on cooperative, mutually beneficial projects with the Ukrainian government, especially supporting Ukraine within the framework of the Association of Southeast Asian Nations. During Russia's conflict with Ukraine, the government of Cambodia upholds Ukraine's territorial integrity and sovereignty while defending law and order.

==== Israel-Palestine Conflict ====
A resolution passed by the UN General Assembly (UNGA) demanding an immediate humanitarian truce in the Gaza Strip and the unconditional release of all hostages included Cambodia among the 153 nations who supported it. Spokesman for the government Pen Bona stated that because the Kingdom has gone through war, it is more aware of the terrible effects of it. Fortunately, peace has returned to Cambodia because of former Prime Minister Hun Sen's win-win approach. The Cambodian government supports ways to defuse the situation and establish a ceasefire in the conflict.

== Controversy ==
=== Forced Eviction ===
In a study by human rights organization Amnesty International, there had been a violation of international law. Where families are being relocated fifteen miles (24 km) to a new neighborhood. Authorities in Cambodia assert that squatters are causing environmental harm by establishing unofficial colonies. According to a government spokesman, that was "not right" and the relocations were done voluntarily, 10,000 families were relocated, according to government spokeswoman Pen Bona, in compliance with Unesco's restrictions prohibiting buildings and habitation on the property. However, Unesco, on the other hand, stated that it "never requested, nor supported, nor was a party to this programme" and that, in reaction to the report, it has asked the authorities to implement "corrective measures". In a statement, a UN body said, "Unesco is deeply concerned about the population relocation programme in Angkor,".According to Amnesty International, the Apsara National Authority, the organization in charge of overseeing the temple complex, is using Unesco as justification for the relocations. Residents told the AFP news agency that they were warned directly by Cambodian authorities that "Unesco wants you to leave" or else the property's designation as a world historic site would be jeopardized. Based on court summonses seen by AFP, Apsara has sued at least seven people who reside near Angkor Wat for allegedly instigating and blocking public work."Unless there is serious pushback from Unesco, conservation efforts may increasingly be weaponised by states to their own ends, at the expense of human rights," said Montse Ferrer of Amnesty International.

=== Arrest of Critics ===
A man who had publicly criticised the CPP on Facebook for not being able to stop drug usage and illegal immigration from Vietnam was sentenced to three years in prison, was found guilty of inciting dissidence, slander, and insulting the king. Kang Saran was detained by Banteay Meanchey officials for ten days after his detention in a matter of hours. On July 11, he was granted bail and freed.

=== Techo Funan Canal ===
The Vietnamese and US government requested for more transparency on a $1.7 billion canal project being constructed in southern Cambodia by a state-owned Chinese company. Construction on the 180-kilometer Techo Funan Canal, which is expected to start later this year, will link the coastal province of Kep and the capital city of Phnom Penh. This will lower the cost of shipping goods between the capital and Sihanoukville, the nation's only deep-water port, and lessen the country's dependency on Vietnamese ports. The Belt and Road Forum in Beijing last year resulted in the development of the canal being awarded to China's state-owned China Bridge and Road Corporation. Prime Minister Hun Manet has referred to the project as a means of "breathing through our own nose." Despite the government's claims that the project will help Cambodia's economy by reducing its reliance on its eastern neighbour, the project's environmental and security implications have come under scrutiny, especially from Vietnam.

== Cabinet ==
Portfolio	Minister	Took office	Left office	Party
Prime Minister	Hun Manet	22 August 2023	Incumbent	CPP
Permanent Deputy Prime Minister; Minister in charge of the Office of the Council of Ministers	Vongsey Vissoth	22 August 2023	Incumbent	CPP
Deputy Prime Minister; Minister of Economy and Finance	Aun Pornmoniroth	22 August 2023	Incumbent	CPP
Deputy Prime Minister; Minister of Interior	Sar Sokha	22 August 2023	Incumbent	CPP
Deputy Prime Minister; Minister of National Defence	Tea Seiha	22 August 2023	Incumbent	CPP
Deputy Prime Minister; Minister of Education, Youth and Sport	Hangchuon Naron	22 August 2023	Incumbent	CPP
Deputy Prime Minister; Minister of Foreign Affairs and International Cooperation	Sok Chenda Sophea	22 August 2023	20 November 2024	CPP
Deputy Prime Minister; Minister of Foreign Affairs and International Cooperation	Prak Sokhonn	20 November 2024	Incumbent	CPP
Deputy Prime Minister; Minister of Justice	Keut Rith	22 August 2023	Incumbent	CPP
Deputy Prime Minister; Minister of Land Management, Urban Planning and Construction	Say Sam Al	22 August 2023	Incumbent	CPP
Deputy Prime Minister	Sun Chanthol	22 August 2023	Incumbent	CPP
Deputy Prime Minister	Neth Savoeun	22 August 2023	Incumbent	CPP
Deputy Prime Minister	Sok Chenda Sophea	22 August 2023	Incumbent	CPP
Deputy Prime Minister	Hun Many	21 February 2024	Incumbent	CPP
Minister of Civil Service	Hun Many	22 August 2023	Incumbent	CPP
Minister of Agriculture, Forestry and Fisheries	Dith Tina	22 August 2023	Incumbent	CPP
Minister of Commerce	Cham Nimul	22 August 2023	Incumbent	CPP
Minister of Cults and Religion	Chay Borin	22 August 2023	Incumbent	CPP
Minister of Culture and Fine Arts	Phoeurng Sackona	22 August 2023	Incumbent	CPP
Minister of Environment	Eang Sophalleth	22 August 2023	Incumbent	CPP
Minister of Health	Chheang Ra	22 August 2023	Incumbent	CPP
Minister of Industry, Science, Technology and Innovation	Hem Vanndy	22 August 2023	Incumbent	CPP
Minister of Information	Neth Pheaktra	22 August 2023	Incumbent	CPP
Minister of Inspection	Huot Hak	22 August 2023	20 September 2024	CPP
Minister of Inspection	Sok Soken	20 September 2024	Incumbent	CPP
Minister of Labour and Vocational Training	Heng Sour	22 August 2023	Incumbent	CPP
Minister of Mines and Energy	Keo Rattanak	22 August 2023	Incumbent	CPP
Minister of Planning	Bin Trochhey	22 August 2023	Incumbent	CPP
Minister of Posts and Telecommunications	Chea Vandeth	22 August 2023	Incumbent	CPP
Minister of Public Works and Transport	Peng Ponea	22 August 2023	Incumbent	CPP
Minister of Rural Development	Chhay Rithysen	22 August 2023	Incumbent	CPP
Minister of Social Affairs, Veterans and Youth Rehabilitation	Chea Somethy	22 August 2023	Incumbent	CPP
Minister of Tourism	Sok Soken	22 August 2023	20 September 2024	CPP
Minister of Tourism	Huot Hak	20 September 2024	Incumbent	CPP
Minister of Water Resources and Meteorology	Thor Chetha	22 August 2023	Incumbent	CPP
Minister of Women's Affairs	Ing Kantha Phavi	22 August 2023	Incumbent	CPP
Minister in charge of the State Secretariat of Civil Aviation	Mao Havannall	22 August 2023	Incumbent	CPP
Minister in charge of the State Secretariat of Border Affairs	Lam Chea	22 August 2023	Incumbent	CPP
