= Cabinet of Cambodia =

Executive of Cambodia

Seal of the Cabinet of Cambodia.

The Cabinet of Cambodia, officially known as the Office of the Council of Ministers (Khmer: ទីស្ដីការគណៈរដ្ឋមន្ត្រី, Ti Sdeikar Kônărôdthâmôntrei), is the executive body of the Kingdom of Cambodia led by the Prime Minister, assisted by Deputy Prime Ministers, Senior Ministers, Ministers, Secretaries of State, and Undersecretaries of State. Members of the Cabinet are nominated by the Prime Minister and appointed by the Monarch.

== Role ==
Chapter VIII of the Constitution states the role of the Royal Government of Cambodia.

- Article 99: The Council of Ministers is the Royal Government of Cambodia. The Council of Ministers shall be led by one Prime Minister assisted by Deputy Prime Ministers, and by State Ministers, Ministers, and State Secretaries as members.
- Article 100: At the recommendation of the President and with the agreement of both Vice-Presidents of the Assembly, the King shall designate a dignitary from among the representatives of the winning party to form the Royal Government. This designated Assembly or members of the political parties represented in from the Assembly. After the Assembly has given its vote of confidence, the King shall issue a Royal decree (Kret) appointing the entire Council of Ministers. Before taking office, the Council of Ministers shall take an oath as stipulated in Annex 6.
- Article 101: The functions of members of the Royal Government shall be incompatible with professional activities in trade or industry and with the holding of any position in the public service.
- Article 102: Members of the Royal Government shall be collectively responsible to the Assembly for the overall policy of the Royal Government. Each member of the Royal Government shall be individually responsible to the Prime Minister and the Assembly for his/her own conduct.
- Article 103: Members of the Royal Government shall not use the orders, written or verbal, of anyone as grounds to exonerate themselves from their responsibility.
- Article 104: The Council of Minister shall meet every week in plenary session or in a working session. The Prime Minister shall chair the plenary sessions. The Prime Minister may assign a Deputy Prime Minister to preside over the working sessions. Minutes of the Council of Ministers' meeting shall be forwarded to the King for His information.
- Article 105: The Prime Minister shall have the right to delegate his power to a Deputy Prime Minister or to any member of the Royal Government.
- Article 106: If the post of Prime Minister is permanently vacant, a new Council of Ministers shall be appointed under the procedure stipulated in this Constitution. If the vacancy is temporary, an acting Prime Minister shall be provisionally appointed.
- Article 107:Each member of the Royal Government shall be punished for any crimes or misdemeanors that he/she has committed in the course of his/her duty. In such cases and when his/her duty, the Assembly shall decide to file charges against him/her with competent. The Assembly shall decide on such matters through a secret vote by a simple majority thereof.
- Article 108: The organization and functioning of the Council of Ministers shall be determined by law.

== Current cabinet ==
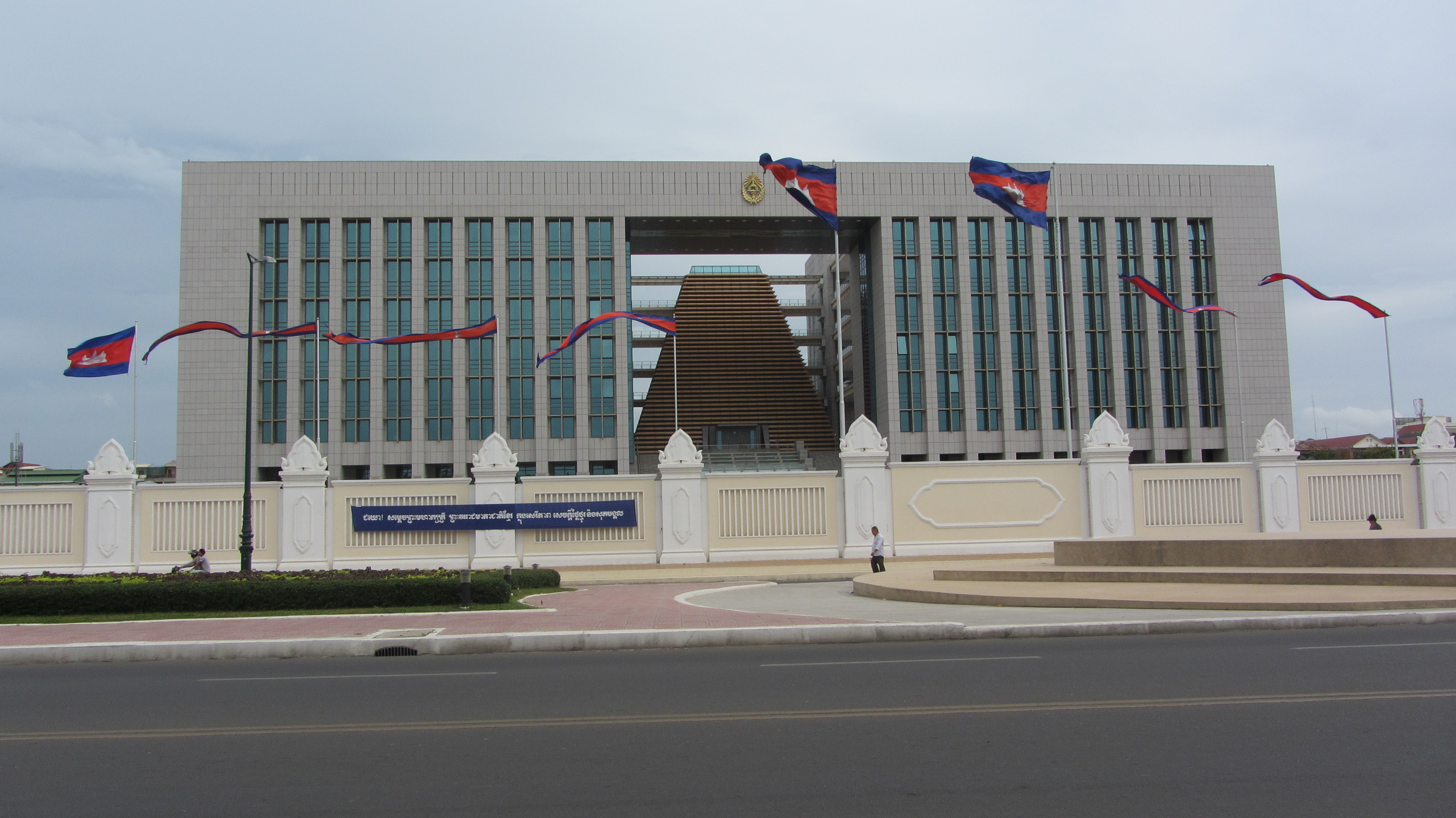
The Office of the Council of Ministers in Phnom Penh hosts Cabinet meetings.

The members of the seventh and current Council of Ministers were sworn in on 22 August 2023. The National Assembly voted Hun Manet as Prime Minister for five-year term.

Cabinet members
Portfolio	Minister	Took office	Left office	Party
Prime Minister	Hun Manet	22 August 2023	Incumbent	CPP
Permanent Deputy Prime Minister; Minister in charge of the Office of the Council of Ministers	Vongsey Vissoth	22 August 2023	Incumbent	CPP
Deputy Prime Minister; Minister of Economy and Finance	Aun Pornmoniroth	22 August 2023	Incumbent	CPP
Deputy Prime Minister; Minister of Interior	Sar Sokha	22 August 2023	Incumbent	CPP
Deputy Prime Minister; Minister of National Defence	Tea Seiha	22 August 2023	Incumbent	CPP
Deputy Prime Minister; Minister of Education, Youth and Sport	Hangchuon Naron	22 August 2023	Incumbent	CPP
Deputy Prime Minister; Minister of Foreign Affairs and International Cooperation	Sok Chenda Sophea	22 August 2023	20 November 2024	CPP
Deputy Prime Minister; Minister of Foreign Affairs and International Cooperation	Prak Sokhonn	20 November 2024	Incumbent	CPP
Deputy Prime Minister; Minister of Justice	Keut Rith	22 August 2023	Incumbent	CPP
Deputy Prime Minister; Minister of Land Management, Urban Planning and Construction	Say Sam Al	22 August 2023	Incumbent	CPP
Deputy Prime Minister	Sun Chanthol	22 August 2023	Incumbent	CPP
Deputy Prime Minister	Neth Savoeun	22 August 2023	Incumbent	CPP
Deputy Prime Minister	Sok Chenda Sophea	22 August 2023	Incumbent	CPP
Deputy Prime Minister	Hun Many	21 February 2024	Incumbent	CPP
Minister of Civil Service	Hun Many	22 August 2023	Incumbent	CPP
Minister of Agriculture, Forestry and Fisheries	Dith Tina	22 August 2023	Incumbent	CPP
Minister of Commerce	Cham Nimul	22 August 2023	Incumbent	CPP
Minister of Cults and Religion	Chay Borin	22 August 2023	Incumbent	CPP
Minister of Culture and Fine Arts	Phoeurng Sackona	22 August 2023	Incumbent	CPP
Minister of Environment	Eang Sophalleth	22 August 2023	Incumbent	CPP
Minister of Health	Chheang Ra	22 August 2023	Incumbent	CPP
Minister of Industry, Science, Technology and Innovation	Hem Vanndy	22 August 2023	Incumbent	CPP
Minister of Information	Neth Pheaktra	22 August 2023	Incumbent	CPP
Minister of Inspection	Huot Hak	22 August 2023	20 September 2024	CPP
Minister of Inspection	Sok Soken	20 September 2024	Incumbent	CPP
Minister of Labour and Vocational Training	Heng Sour	22 August 2023	Incumbent	CPP
Minister of Mines and Energy	Keo Rattanak	22 August 2023	Incumbent	CPP
Minister of Planning	Bin Trochhey	22 August 2023	Incumbent	CPP
Minister of Posts and Telecommunications	Chea Vandeth	22 August 2023	Incumbent	CPP
Minister of Public Works and Transport	Peng Ponea	22 August 2023	Incumbent	CPP
Minister of Rural Development	Chhay Rithysen	22 August 2023	Incumbent	CPP
Minister of Social Affairs, Veterans and Youth Rehabilitation	Chea Somethy	22 August 2023	Incumbent	CPP
Minister of Tourism	Sok Soken	22 August 2023	20 September 2024	CPP
Minister of Tourism	Huot Hak	20 September 2024	Incumbent	CPP
Minister of Water Resources and Meteorology	Thor Chetha	22 August 2023	Incumbent	CPP
Minister of Women's Affairs	Ing Kantha Phavi	22 August 2023	Incumbent	CPP
Minister in charge of the State Secretariat of Civil Aviation	Mao Havannall	22 August 2023	Incumbent	CPP
Minister in charge of the State Secretariat of Border Affairs	Lam Chea	22 August 2023	Incumbent	CPP
