= Deputy prime minister =

Government position secondary to the prime minister

A deputy prime minister or vice prime minister is, in some countries, a government minister who can take the position of acting prime minister when the prime minister is temporarily absent. The position is often likened to that of a vice president, as both positions are "number two" offices, but there are some differences.

The states of Australia and provinces of Canada each have the analogous office of deputy premier. In the devolved administrations of the United Kingdom, an analogous position is that of the deputy First Minister, albeit the position in Northern Ireland has equivalent powers to the First Minister differing only in the titles of the offices. In Canada, the position of deputy prime minister should not be confused with the Canadian deputy minister of the prime minister of Canada, a nonpolitical civil servant position.

In Austria and Germany, the officeholder is known as vice-chancellor.

A deputy prime minister traditionally serves as acting prime minister when the prime minister is temporarily absent or incapable of exercising power. The deputy prime minister is often asked to succeed to the prime minister's office following the prime minister's sudden death or unexpected resignation, but that is not necessarily mandated by the constitution. This government position is often a job that is held simultaneously with another ministry, and is usually given to one of the most senior or experienced ministers of the cabinet. The holder of this office may also be deputy leader of the governing party, or perhaps the leader of the junior party of a coalition government.

Little scholarly attention has focused on deputy prime ministers, as they are sometimes less involved in the political power plays of government and more focus on the work at hand. A 2009 study in Political Science identified nine 'qualities' of deputy prime ministership: temperament; relationships with their Cabinet and caucus; relationships with their party; popularity with the public; media skills; achievements as deputy prime minister; relationship with the prime minister; leadership ambition; and method of succession.

By contrast, the structure of the Government of Russia and Cabinet of Ministers of Ukraine provides for several deputy prime ministers or vice prime ministers. In the case of the Russian government, the prime minister is responsible for defining the scope of the duties for each of their deputies, who also may head a specific ministry: e.g. the former Minister of Finance of Russia, Alexey Kudrin, also serves as one of the deputies of the prime ministers or vice-premiers. One or two of these deputy prime ministers may hold the title of a first deputy prime minister. Russian federal law indicates that in accordance with the order established in advance, one of the deputy prime ministers may temporarily substitute for the prime minister in their absence. Customarily, however, it is to one of the "first" Deputy prime ministers that the prime-ministerial duties may be delegated. At the same time, in the case of prime minister's resignation, the law allows the President of Russia to choose any of the current vice-premiers to serve as an acting prime minister until the confirmation of the new government.

There is also the special case of Belgium: in the Federal Government of Belgium, a deputy prime minister not only replaces the prime minister in the case they are incapacitated, but also acts as the link between the government and their political party. In short, in Belgium, a Deputy prime minister is the voice of their political party in the federal government, and they are the voice of the government in their political party. The prime minister and the deputy prime ministers form what is called the "inner cabinet" (kernkabinet; conseil des ministres restreint or kern), an instance where the most important political decisions are discussed and taken.

== Lists of deputy prime ministers ==
State	Office	Officeholder	Assumed office
Afghanistan	First Deputy prime minister	Abdul Ghani Baradar	7 September 2021
Afghanistan	Second Deputy prime minister	Abdul Salam Hanafi	7 September 2021
Albania	Deputy prime minister	Albana Koçiu	6 March 2026
Algeria	Deputy prime minister	Vacant (since 2019)	N/A
Antigua and Barbuda	Deputy prime minister	Vacant (since 2023)	N/A
Armenia	Deputy prime ministers	Mher Grigoryan	11 May 2018
Armenia	Deputy prime ministers	Tigran Khachatryan	19 December 2022
Australia	Deputy prime minister	Richard Marles	23 May 2022
Austria	Vice-chancellor	Andreas Babler	3 March 2025
Azerbaijan	First Deputy Prime Minister	Yaqub Eyyubov	13 February 2003
Azerbaijan	Deputy prime ministers	Ali Ahmadov	22 October 2023
Azerbaijan	Deputy prime ministers	Shahin Mustafayev	22 October 2019
Bahamas	Deputy prime minister	Chester Cooper	17 September 2021
Bahrain	Deputy prime minister	Khalid bin Abdullah Al Khalifa	2 November 2010
Barbados	Deputy prime minister	Santia Bradshaw	26 January 2022
Belarus	First Deputy prime minister	Nikolai Snopkov	4 June 2020
Belarus	Deputy prime ministers	Viktor Karankevich	12 August 2024
Belarus	Deputy prime ministers	Natalia Petkevich	22 May 2025
Belarus	Deputy prime ministers	Aleksandr Terekhov	9 April 2026
Belgium	Deputy prime ministers	Frank Vandenbroucke	1 October 2020
Belgium	Deputy prime ministers	Jan Jambon	3 February 2025
Belgium	Deputy prime ministers	David Clarinval	21 April 2022
Belgium	Deputy prime ministers	Maxime Prévot	3 February 2025
Belgium	Deputy prime ministers	Vincent Van Peteghem	1 October 2020
Belize	Deputy prime minister	Cordel Hyde	16 November 2020
Brunei	Senior minister	Al-Muhtadee Billah	24 May 2005
Bulgaria	Deputy prime ministers	Galab Donev	8 May 2026
Bulgaria	Deputy prime ministers	Aleksandur Pulev	8 May 2026
Bulgaria	Deputy prime ministers	Ivo Hristov	8 May 2026
Bulgaria	Deputy prime ministers	Atanas Pekanov	8 May 2026
Cambodia	Deputy prime ministers	Vongsey Vissoth	22 August 2023
Cambodia	Deputy prime ministers	Aun Pornmoniroth	22 August 2023
Cambodia	Deputy prime ministers	Sun Chanthol	22 August 2023
Cambodia	Deputy prime ministers	Hang Chuon Naron	22 August 2023
Cambodia	Deputy prime ministers	Say Sam Al	22 August 2023
Cambodia	Deputy prime ministers	Sar Sokha	22 August 2023
Cambodia	Deputy prime ministers	Tea Seiha	22 August 2023
Cambodia	Deputy prime ministers	Koeut Rith	22 August 2023
Cambodia	Deputy prime ministers	Neth Savoeun	22 August 2023
Cambodia	Deputy prime ministers	Sok Chenda Sophea	22 August 2023
Cambodia	Deputy prime ministers	Hun Many	21 February 2024
Cambodia	Deputy prime ministers	Prak Sokhonn	20 November 2024
Canada	Deputy prime minister	Vacant (since 2024)	N/A
China	Vice premiers	Ding Xuexiang	12 March 2023
China	Vice premiers	He Lifeng	12 March 2023
China	Vice premiers	Zhang Guoqing	12 March 2023
China	Vice premiers	Liu Guozhong	12 March 2023
Croatia	Deputy prime ministers	Davor Božinović	29 July 2019
Croatia	Deputy prime ministers	Tomo Medved	23 July 2020
Croatia	Deputy prime ministers	Oleg Butković	15 July 2022
Croatia	Deputy prime ministers	Branko Bačić	17 January 2023
Croatia	Deputy prime ministers	Ivan Anušić	16 November 2023
Croatia	Deputy prime ministers	David Vlajčić	11 February 2025
Croatia	Deputy prime ministers	Tomislav Ćorić	29 January 2026
Czech Republic	First Deputy prime minister	Karel Havlíček	15 December 2025
Czech Republic	Deputy prime ministers	Alena Schillerová	15 December 2025
Czech Republic	Deputy prime ministers	Petr Macinka	15 December 2025
Czech Republic	Deputy prime ministers	Jaromír Zůna	15 December 2025
Denmark	Deputy prime minister	Vacant (since 2026)	N/A
Dominica	Deputy Prime Minister	Irving McIntyre	13 December 2022
East Timor	Deputy prime ministers	Francisco Kalbuadi Lay	1 July 2023
East Timor	Deputy prime ministers	Mariano Sabino Lopes	1 July 2023
Egypt	Deputy prime minister	Hussein Mohamed Ahmed Eissa	11 February 2026
Equatorial Guinea	First Deputy prime minister	Gaudencio Mohaba Messu	Late 2024
Equatorial Guinea	Second Deputy prime minister	Ángel Mesie Mibuy	5 February 2018
Equatorial Guinea	Third Deputy prime minister	Alfonso Nsue Mokuy	23 June 2016
Eswatini	Deputy prime minister	Thulisile Dladla	13 November 2023
Ethiopia	Deputy prime ministers	Temesgen Tiruneh	8 February 2024
Ethiopia	Deputy prime ministers	Adem Farah	1 April 2024
Fiji	Deputy prime minister	Biman Prasad	24 December 2022
Finland	Deputy prime minister	Riikka Purra	20 June 2023
Georgia	Deputy prime ministers	Irakli Chikovani	8 February 2024
Georgia	Deputy prime ministers	Maka Bochorishvili	22 April 2026
Georgia	Deputy prime ministers	Mamuka Mdinaradze	30 April 2026
Germany	Vice-Chancellor	Lars Klingbeil	6 May 2025
Greece	Deputy prime minister	Kostis Hatzidakis	15 March 2025
Hungary	Deputy prime ministers	Anita Orbán	16 May 2026
Hungary	Deputy prime ministers	Bálint Ruff	19 May 2026
India	Deputy prime minister	Vacant (since 2004)	N/A
Iraq	Deputy prime minister	Fuad Hussein	6 June 2020
Ireland	Tánaiste	Simon Harris	23 January 2025
Israel	Deputy prime minister	Yariv Levin	29 December 2022
Italy	Deputy prime minister	Matteo Salvini	22 October 2022
Italy	Deputy prime minister	Antonio Tajani	22 October 2022
Jamaica	Deputy prime minister	Horace Chang	7 September 2020
Japan	Deputy prime minister	Vacant (since 2021)	N/A
Jordan	Deputy prime ministers	Ayman Safadi	October 2020
Jordan	Deputy prime ministers	Nasser Shraideh	22 October 2022
Kazakhstan	First Deputy prime minister	Nurlybek Nalibayev	6 May 2026
Kazakhstan	Deputy prime ministers	Galymzhan Koishybayev	2023
Kazakhstan	Deputy prime ministers	Kanat Bozumbayev	31 March 2024
Kazakhstan	Deputy prime ministers	Serik Zhumangarin	September 2022
Kazakhstan	Deputy prime ministers	Zhaslan Madiyev	29 September 2025
Kazakhstan	Deputy prime ministers	Aida Balayeva	1 December 2025
Kosovo	Deputy prime ministers	Glauk Konjufca	11 February 2026
Kosovo	Deputy prime ministers	Donika Gërvalla-Schwarz	11 February 2026
Kosovo	Deputy prime ministers	Fikrim Damka	11 February 2026
Kurdistan	Deputy prime minister	Qubad Talabani	10 July 2019
Kuwait	First Deputy prime minister	Sheikh Fahad Yousuf Saud Al-Sabah	12 May 2024
Kuwait	Deputy prime minister	Shereeda Abdullah Al-Mousherji	12 May 2024
Kyrgyzstan	First Deputy Chairman	Daniyar Amangeldiev	18 December 2024
Kyrgyzstan	Deputy Chairmen	Bakyt Torobayev	30 March 2022
Kyrgyzstan	Deputy Chairmen	Kamchybek Tashiev	13 October 2021
Kyrgyzstan	Deputy Chairmen	Ulan Mamatkanov	April 2026
Kyrgyzstan	Deputy Chairmen	Erlis Akunbekov	26 February 2026
Kyrgyzstan	Deputy Chairmen	Dilnoza Kattakhonova	10 July 2026
Laos	Deputy prime ministers	Gen. Vilay Lakhamphong	2021
Laos	Deputy prime ministers	Saleumxay Kommasith	June 2022
Laos	Deputy prime ministers	Khamlieng Outhakaysone	23 March 2026
Laos	Deputy prime ministers	Santiphab Phomvihane	23 March 2026
Lebanon	Deputy prime minister	Tarek Mitri	8 February 2025
Lesotho	Deputy prime minister	Mathibeli Mokhothu	21 May 2020
Liechtenstein	Deputy prime minister	Sabine Monauni	25 March 2021
Luxembourg	Deputy prime ministers	Xavier Bettel	17 November 2023
Malaysia	Deputy prime ministers	Ahmad Zahid Hamidi	3 December 2022
Malaysia	Deputy prime ministers	Fadillah Yusof	3 December 2022
Malta	Deputy prime minister	Ian Borg	17 September 2024
Mauritius	Deputy prime minister	Arianne Navarre-Marie	4 May 2026
Moldova	Deputy prime ministers	Vladimir Bolea	16 February 2023
Moldova	Deputy prime ministers	Mihai Popșoi	29 January 2024
Moldova	Deputy prime ministers	Cristina Gherasimov	5 February 2024
Moldova	Deputy prime ministers	Valeriu Chiveri	1 November 2025
Mongolia	Deputy prime ministers	Jadambyn Enkhbayar	25 November 2025
Mongolia	Deputy prime ministers	Nyamtaishiryn Nomtoibayar	4 April 2026
Mongolia	Deputy prime ministers	Togmidyn Dorjkhand	10 July 2024
Montenegro	Deputy prime ministers	Aleksa Bečić	31 October 2023
Montenegro	Deputy prime ministers	Budimir Aleksić	31 October 2023
Montenegro	Deputy prime ministers	Ervin Ibrahimović	31 October 2023
Montenegro	Deputy prime ministers	Filip Ivanović	31 October 2023
Montenegro	Deputy prime ministers	Momo Koprivica	31 October 2023
Montenegro	Deputy prime ministers	Nik Gjeloshaj	31 October 2023
Namibia	Deputy-prime minister	Vacant (since 2025)	N/A
Nepal	Deputy prime minister	Swarnim Wagle	27 March 2026
Netherlands	Deputy prime ministers	Dilan Yeşilgöz	23 February 2026
Netherlands	Deputy prime ministers	Bart van den Brink	23 February 2026
New Zealand	Deputy prime minister	David Seymour	31 May 2025
North Korea	First Vice premier	Kim Tok-hun	22 March 2026
North Korea	Vice premiers	Pak Jong-gun	17 January 2026
North Korea	Vice premiers	Jon Sung-guk	8 June 2026
North Korea	Vice premiers	Kim Chang-sok	22 March 2026
North Korea	Vice premiers	Jon Hyon-chol	22 March 2026
North Korea	Vice premiers	Pak Hun	22 March 2026
North Korea	Vice premiers	Ri Kyong-il	22 March 2026
North Macedonia	First Deputy prime minister	Bekim Sali	mid-2024
North Macedonia	Deputy prime ministers	Aleksandar Nikoloski	mid-2024
North Macedonia	Deputy prime ministers	Ljupcho Dimovski	mid-2024
North Macedonia	Deputy prime ministers	Ivan Stoilkovikj	mid-2024
Oman	Deputy prime minister	Sayyid Fahd bin Mahmoud al-Said	May 1979
Oman	Deputy prime minister	Shihab bin Tarik al-Said	9 March 2020
Oman	Deputy prime minister	Theyazin bin Haitham al-Said	January 2026
Pakistan	Deputy prime minister	Ishaq Dar	29 March 2024
Papua New Guinea	Deputy prime minister	John Rosso	25 May 2022
Poland	Deputy prime minister	Władysław Kosiniak-Kamysz	13 December 2023
Poland	Deputy prime minister	Krzysztof Gawkowski	13 December 2023
Poland	Deputy prime minister	Radosław Sikorski	24 July 2025
Portugal	Deputy prime minister	Vacant (since 2015)	N/A
Qatar	Deputy prime minister	Sheikh Saoud bin Abdulrahman Al Thani	12 November 2024
Romania	Deputy prime ministers	Cătălin Predoiu	15 June 2023
Romania	Deputy prime ministers	Barna Tánczos	23 December 2024
Romania	Deputy prime ministers	Oana Gheorghiu	30 October 2025
Romania	Deputy prime ministers	Radu Miruță	23 December 2025
Russia	First Deputy Chairman	Denis Manturov	14 May 2024
Russia	Deputy Chairmen	Dmitry Grigorenko	21 January 2020
Russia	Deputy Chairmen	Yury Trutnev	21 January 2020
Russia	Deputy Chairmen	Tatyana Golikova	21 January 2020
Russia	Deputy Chairmen	Marat Khusnullin	21 January 2020
Russia	Deputy Chairmen	Alexey Overchuk	21 January 2020
Russia	Deputy Chairmen	Dmitry Chernyshenko	21 January 2020
Russia	Deputy Chairmen	Alexander Novak	10 November 2020
Russia	Deputy Chairmen	Vitaly Savelyev	14 May 2024
Russia	Deputy Chairmen	Dmitry Patrushev	14 May 2024
Saint Kitts and Nevis	Deputy prime minister	Geoffrey Hanley	6 August 2022
Saint Lucia	Deputy prime minister	Ernest Hilaire	7 January 2022
Saint Vincent and the Grenadines	Deputy prime minister	Clair Leacock	3 December 2025
Samoa	Deputy prime minister	Mulipola Anarosa Ale Molioʻo	26 May 2026
Saudi Arabia	First Deputy prime minister	Vacant (since 2022)	N/A
Saudi Arabia	Second Deputy prime minister	Vacant (since 2017)	N/A
Serbia	First Deputy prime minister	Siniša Mali	26 October 2022
Serbia	Deputy prime ministers	Ivica Dačić	26 October 2022
Serbia	Deputy prime ministers	Adrijana Mesarović	16 April 2025
Singapore	Deputy prime minister	Gan Kim Yong	15 May 2024
Slovakia	Deputy prime ministers	Robert Kaliňák	25 October 2023
Slovakia	Deputy prime ministers	Denisa Saková	25 October 2023
Slovakia	Deputy prime ministers	Tomáš Taraba	25 October 2023
Slovakia	Deputy prime ministers	Peter Kmec	25 October 2023
Slovenia	Deputy prime ministers	Anže Logar	4 June 2026
Slovenia	Deputy prime ministers	Jernej Vrtovec	4 June 2026
Solomon Islands	Deputy prime minister	Francis Sade	26 May 2026
Somalia	Deputy prime minister	Salah Ahmed Jama	2 August 2022
Somalia	Second Deputy prime minister	Jibril Abdirashid	29 April 2025
South Korea	Deputy prime ministers	Koo Yun-cheol	19 July 2025
South Korea	Deputy prime ministers	Bae Kyung-hoon	16 July 2025
Spain	First Deputy prime minister	Carlos Cuerpo	27 March 2026
Spain	Second Deputy prime minister	Yolanda Díaz	12 July 2021
Spain	Third Deputy prime minister	Sara Aagesen	25 November 2024
Sweden	Deputy prime minister	Ebba Busch	18 October 2022
Taiwan	Vice premier	Cheng Li-chiun	20 May 2024
Tajikistan	First Deputy Prime Minister	Hokim Kholiqzoda	16 January 2024
Tajikistan	Deputy Prime Minister	Sulaimon Ziyozoda	
Tajikistan	Deputy Prime Minister	Dilrabo Mansuri Saidullo	
Tajikistan	Deputy Prime Minister	Usmonali Usmonzoda	
Thailand	Deputy prime ministers	Phiphat Ratchakitprakarn	19 September 2025
Thailand	Deputy prime ministers	Ekniti Nitithanprapas	19 September 2025
Thailand	Deputy prime ministers	Songsak Thongsri	30 March 2026
Thailand	Deputy prime ministers	Sihasak Phuangketkeow	30 March 2026
Thailand	Deputy prime ministers	Suphajee Suthumpun	30 March 2026
Thailand	Deputy prime ministers	Pakorn Nilprapunt	30 March 2026
Timor-Leste	Deputy prime minister	Mariano Sabino Lopes	1 July 2023
Tonga	Deputy prime minister	Viliami Latu	6 January 2026
Turkmenistan	Deputy Chairman of the Cabinet of Ministers	Raşit Meredow	2001
Turkmenistan	Deputy Chairman of the Cabinet of Ministers	Taňryguly Atahallyýew	2023
Turkmenistan	Deputy Chairman of the Cabinet of Ministers	Baýmyrat Annamämmedow	2023
Turkmenistan	Deputy Chairman of the Cabinet of Ministers	Bahar Seýidowa	2025
Turkmenistan	Deputy Chairman of the Cabinet of Ministers	Hojamyrat Geldimyradow	2022
Turkmenistan	Deputy Chairman of the Cabinet of Ministers	Baýramgül Orazdurdyýewa	2024
Turkmenistan	Deputy Chairman of the Cabinet of Ministers	Batyr Amanov	2023
Turkmenistan	Deputy Chairman of the Cabinet of Ministers	Nokerguly Atagulyýew	2024
Turkmenistan	Deputy Chairman of the Cabinet of Ministers	Mämmethan Çakyýew	2025
Tuvalu	Deputy prime minister	Panapasi Nelesoni	27 February 2024
Uganda	First Deputy prime minister	Rebecca Kadaga	June 2021
Uganda	Second Deputy prime minister	Crispus Kiyonga	26 May 2026
Uganda	Third Deputy prime minister	Lukia Isanga Nakadama	9 June 2021
Ukraine	First Deputy prime minister	Denys Shmyhal	14 January 2026
United Arab Emirates	Deputy prime ministers	Mansour bin Zayed Al Nahyan	10 May 2009
United Arab Emirates	Deputy prime ministers	Saif bin Zayed Al Nahyan	10 May 2009
United Arab Emirates	Deputy prime ministers	Maktoum bin Mohammed Al Maktoum	25 September 2021
United Arab Emirates	Deputy prime ministers	Hamdan bin Mohammed Al Maktoum	14 July 2024
United Kingdom	First Secretary of State	Louise Haigh	20 July 2026
Uzbekistan	First Deputy Prime Minister of Uzbekistan	Ochilboy Ramatov	5 February 2019
Uzbekistan	Deputy prime ministers	Jamshid Kuchkarov	20 January 2020
Uzbekistan	Deputy prime ministers	Jamshid Khodjayev	16 July 2022
Uzbekistan	Deputy prime ministers	Dilnozaxon Kattaxonova	10 July 2026
Vanuatu	Deputy prime minister	Johnny Koanapo	February 2025
Vietnam	Permanent Deputy prime minister	Phạm Gia Túc	8 April 2026
Vietnam	Deputy prime ministers	Phan Văn Giang	8 April 2026
Vietnam	Deputy prime ministers	Nguyễn Văn Thắng	8 April 2026
Vietnam	Deputy prime ministers	Lê Tiến Châu	8 April 2026
Vietnam	Deputy prime ministers	Phạm Thị Thanh Trà	25 October 2025
Vietnam	Deputy prime ministers	Hồ Quốc Dũng	25 October 2025
Yemen	Deputy prime minister	Vacant (since 2022)	N/A

== Positions abolished ==
- Deputy Prime Minister of Bangladesh
- Deputy Prime Minister of Burundi
- Deputy Prime Minister of Cameroon
- Deputy Prime Minister of France
- Deputy Prime Minister of Gabon
- Deputy Prime Minister of Grenada
- Deputy Prime Minister of Indonesia
- Deputy Prime Minister of Kenya
- Deputy Prime Minister of Libya
- Deputy Prime Minister of Myanmar
- Deputy Prime Minister of Norway
- Deputy Prime Minister of the Philippines
- Deputy Prime Minister of Suriname
- Deputy Prime Minister of Syria
- Deputy Prime Minister of Turkey
- Deputy Prime Minister of Zimbabwe
