= Pan Sorasak =

Minister of Commerce of Cambodia

His Excellency Pan Sorasak
- ប៉ាន សូរស័ក្ដិ
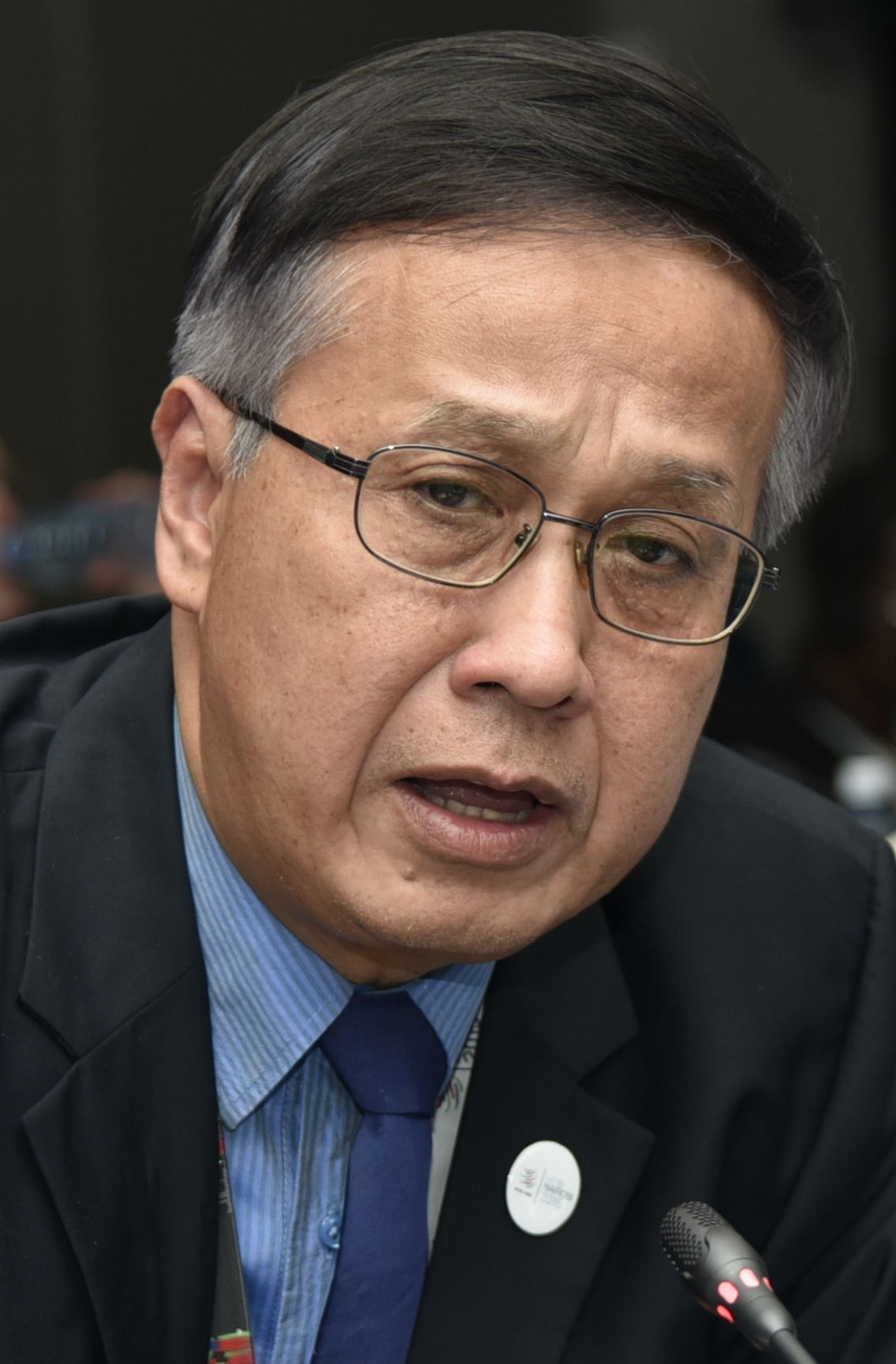

Minister of Commerce
- In office 2 April 2016 – 21 August 2023
- Prime Minister: Hun Sen
- Preceded by: Sun Chanthol
- Succeeded by: Cham Nimul

Personal details
- Born: 30 October 1955 (age 70) Kampong Thom Province, Cambodia
- Party: Cambodian People's Party

Pan Sorasak (Khmer: ប៉ាន សូរស័ក្តិ; born 30 October 1955) was Minister of Commerce of the Royal Government of Cambodia from 2016 to 2023. He was re-appointed to this position in September 2018 for the 6th legislature, having served in the same position during the 5th legislature when he was appointed in April 2016.

== Career ==
Since 2008, he was Secretary of State (Vice Minister) at the Ministry of Commerce, and he was responsible for the Strategic Trade Policy and International Trade Cooperation. He also led a task force among others, on the ratification of Cambodia’s Trade Facilitation Agreement for the WTO’s Bali Package (2013-2016).

Under his leadership, the Ministry of Commerce has pushed for the finalization of many draft laws and various amendments including consumer protection, food safety, competition, secured transaction and trade remedy. He is recognized as one of the main drivers of the use of information and communication technologies (ICT) in SMEs development to increase their competitiveness.

He initiated and led the implementation of the Ministry's ICT Master Plan and Trade Information Website and was responsible for the modernization of the Ministry's ICT infrastructure. Prior to that he initiated the drafting of the E-Commerce Law, the e-Ministry initiative, as well as the creation and standardization of Khmer Unicode script in computers.

Before joining the public sector, Sorasak spent his career in the private sector for 18 years, occupying various senior positions (up to Corporate Vice President) with UNOCAL, an American multinational oil and gas exploration company in the United States, Indonesia, Thailand and Singapore and headed its country office in Cambodia. He also worked as a Researcher for the United States Air Force and the Pentagon.

Sorasak has served in a number organizations including as member of the Board of Architects of Cambodia, Vice Chairman of the National Standard Board, the National Statistical Board, National Council of Science & Technology (NCST) and the American Cambodian Business Council (AmCam).

== See also ==
- Ministry of Commerce
- Ministry of Commerce Facebook Page
- Cabinet of Cambodia
