= Vathana =

Vathana is a Cambodian and Laotian name. Notable people with the name include:

- Vathana Keodouangdeth (born 1996), Laotian footballer
- Ang Vong Vathana, Cambodian minister of justice
