= National Institute of Statistics of Cambodia =

Cambodia's principal government institution in charge of statistics and census data

The National Institute of Statistics is the branch of the Cambodian Ministry of Planning responsible for the collection, processing, and dissemination of official national statistics. It oversees the Social Statistics Department, the Census and Survey Department, the General Statistics Department, and the Economics Statistics Department.

== See also ==
- Cabinet of Cambodia
- Demographics of Cambodia
- List of national and international statistical services
