= Tram Iv Tek =

Cambodian politician (1948–2021)

His Excellency Tram Iv Tek
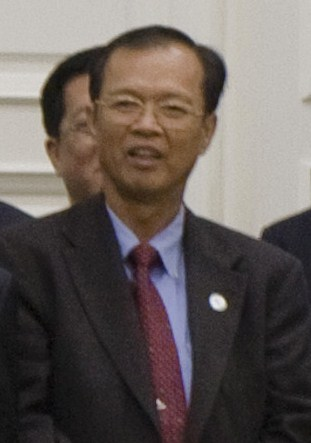
- Iv Tek in 2010

Minister of Posts and Telecommunications
- In office 5 April 2016 – 30 March 2020
- Prime Minister: Hun Sen
- Preceded by: Prak Sokhonn
- Succeeded by: Chea Vandeth

Minister of Public Works and Transport
- In office 25 September 2008 – 4 April 2016
- Prime Minister: Hun Sen
- Preceded by: Sun Chanthol
- Succeeded by: Sun Chanthol

Member of Parliament for Kampong Chhnang Province
- In office 5 September 2018 – 1 June 2021
- In office 27 September 2003 – 10 October 2008

Personal details
- Born: 30 November 1948
- Died: 1 June 2021 (aged 72)
- Party: Cambodian People's Party

Tram Iv Tek (Khmer: ត្រាំ អុីវតឹក, 30 November 1948 – 1 June 2021) was the Minister of Posts and Telecommunications of Cambodia.

He belonged to the Cambodian People's Party and was elected to represent Kampong Chhnang Province in the National Assembly of Cambodia in 2003. Between 2008 and 2016, he served as the Minister of Public Works and Transport of the government of Cambodia.
