= Hun Many =

Cambodian politician (born 1982)

Hun Many PS
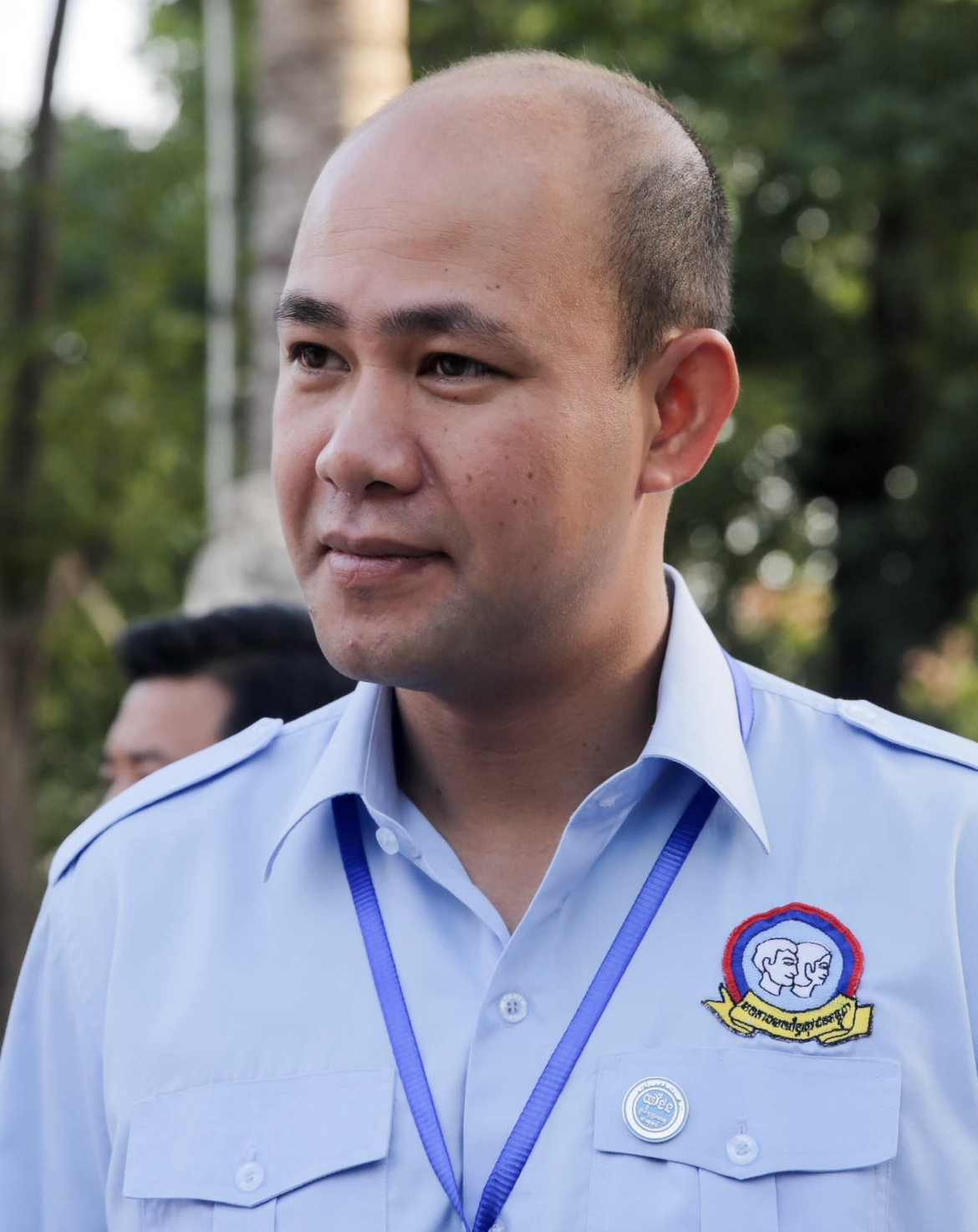
- Hun Many in 2016

Deputy Prime Minister of Cambodia
- Incumbent
- Assumed office 21 February 2024
- Prime Minister: Hun Manet
- Serving with: Aun Pornmoniroth; Neth Savoeun; Sun Chanthol; Hang Chuon Naron; Koeut Rith; Sok Chenda Sophea; Say Sam Al; Sar Sokha; Tea Seiha; Vongsey Vissoth

Minister of Civil Service
- Incumbent
- Assumed office 22 August 2023
- Prime Minister: Hun Manet
- Preceded by: Prum Sokha

Member of the National Assembly
- In office 23 September 2013 – 24 August 2023
- Constituency: Kampong Speu

Personal details
- Born: 27 November 1982 (age 43) Phnom Penh, People's Republic of Kampuchea
- Party: Cambodian People's Party
- Spouse: Yim Chhay Lin
- Children: 3
- Parent(s): Hun Sen; Bun Rany
- Relatives: Hun Manet (brother); Hun Manith (brother); Yim Chhaily (father-in-law)
- Education: Hofstra University (BA); University of Melbourne (MA); National Defense University (MA)

Hun Many (Khmer: ហ៊ុន ម៉ានី; born 27 November 1982) is a Cambodian politician who has served as deputy prime minister of Cambodia since 2024 and minister of civil service since 2023. He was a Member of the National Assembly of Cambodia for Kampong Speu Province from 2013 to 2023. He also currently holds the position of chairman of the Cambodian Youth Union.

== Early life ==
Many was born on 27 November 1982. He is the youngest son of Hun Sen, the former Prime Minister, and his older brother, Hun Manet, is the current Prime Minister, who assumed office in 2023. He earned a bachelor's degree from Hofstra University in the United States and then a master's degree from the University of Melbourne in Australia. He also earned another master's degree from the National Defense University again in the United States.

== Political career ==
Many was voted in as a Member of the National Assembly of Cambodia for Kampong Speu Province in 2013, a position he held until 2023 when he became minister. In January 2016 he stated that Cambodia should seek closer ties with the United States. He specifically highlighted the fields of counterterrorism and trade. In 2023 he became Minister of Civil Service. The following year, in 2024, he became Deputy Prime Minister of Cambodia. He was voted in with all 120 votes of confidence to serve from 2023 to 2028. Since then, he has met with the EU Ambassador, Igor Driesmans, to discuss the civil service reforms taking place in Cambodia and met a Chinese delegation led by Li Shulei.

He also currently holds the position of chairman of the Cambodian Youth Union. During his tenure, the UYFC has taken over many of the operations of the Ministry of Education, Youth, and Sports, alongside being chairman of the National Assembly's Commission 7, which oversees the ministry.

== Personal life ==
He is married to Yim Chhay Lin, the daughter of former Deputy Minister of Rural Development Yim Chhaily.

== Honours and awards ==
Many was awarded the Padma Shri by the Republic of India in 2018 for his work in public affairs.
