= Ministry of Women's Affairs (Cambodia) =

Government ministry of Cambodia

- ក្រសួងកិច្ចការនារី (Khmer); Krâsuŏng Kĕchchâkar Néari

Agency overview
- Formed: 1993
- Jurisdiction: Royal Government of Cambodia
- Headquarters: Phnom Penh, Cambodia
- Minister responsible: Dr. Ing Kantha Phavi, Minister of Women's Affairs
- Website: mwa.gov.kh

The Ministry of Women's Affairs (Khmer: ក្រសួងកិច្ចការនារី) is a government ministry responsible for women affairs in Cambodia. It was established in 1993 as the Ministry of Women and Veterans' Affairs (Khmer: ក្រសួងកិច្ចការនារីនិងអតីតយុទ្ធជន). Its minister since 2004 is Dr. Ing Kantha Phavi.

== Departments ==
- Department of Administration and Staff
- Department of Finance and Supply
- Department of Planning and Statistic
- Department of International Cooperation
- Department of Information
- Department of Gender Equality
- Department of Economic Development
- Department of Legal Protection
- Department of Women and Health
- Department of Women and Education
- Department of Internal Audit

Source: Organization chart

== See also ==
- Government of Cambodia
- Cabinet of Cambodia
