= Ang Vong Vathana =

Cambodian politician

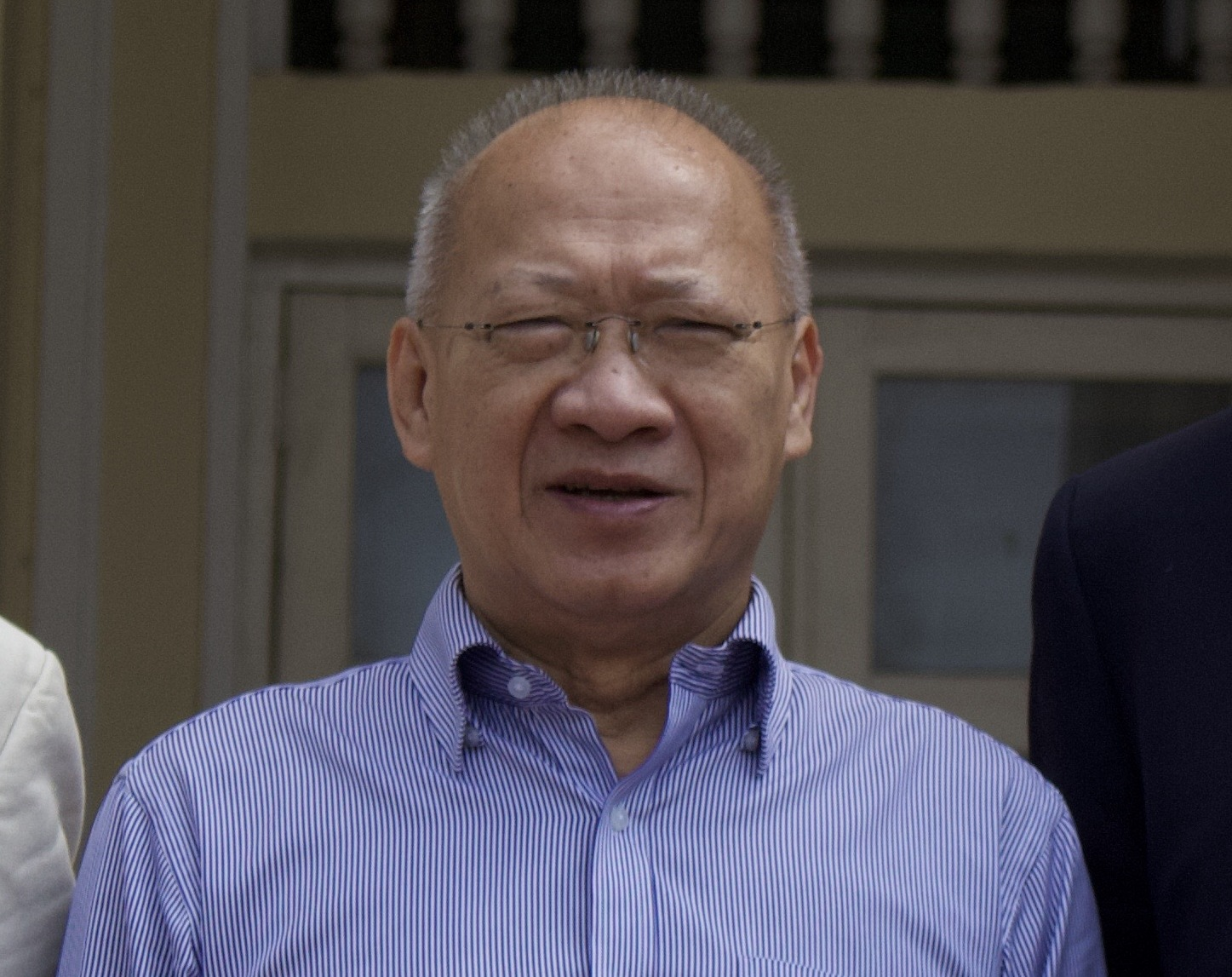
- Vong Vathana in 2019

Minister of Justice
- In office 2004–2020
- Prime Minister: Hun Sen
- Preceded by: Neav Sithong
- Succeeded by: Koeut Rith

Personal details
- Occupation: politician

Ang Vong Vathana (Khmer: អង្គ វង្សវឌ្ឍនា) is a Cambodian politician. He was the Minister of Justice from 2004 to 2020.

In 2016, he became the sole Cambodian to be named in the Panama Papers leak, which uncovered he was a shareholder in the offshore venture RCD International which dissolved in 2010; the findings prompted calls for a corruption investigation into Vong Vathana.
