= Ing Kantha Phavi =

Cambodian politician

Her Excellency Dr. Ing Kantha Phavi
- អ៊ឹង កន្ថាផាវី
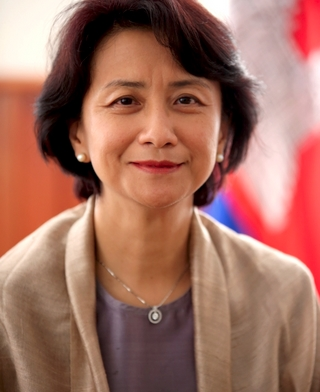

Minister of Women's Affairs
- Incumbent
- Assumed office 16 July 2004
- Prime Minister: Hun Sen; Hun Manet
- Preceded by: Mu Sochua

Personal details
- Party: Cambodian People's Party
- Education: Pierre and Marie Curie University (MD); École nationale d'administration (MPA)
- Profession: Physician; politician

Ing Kantha Phavi (Khmer: អ៊ឹង កន្ថាផាវី) is a Cambodian physician, politician and women's rights advocate who has served as the Minister of Women's Affairs since 2004. In addition to her role as Minister, she has served as the Chairwoman of the Cambodian National Council for Women since 2004, and the President of the National Committee for Promotion of Social Morality, Women and Khmer Families Values since 2006. She is recognized for her leadership in advancing gender equality, anti-violence legislation, and women’s economic empowerment in Cambodia and internationally.

== Education ==
Ing Kantha Phavi studied medicine in France, earning a Doctor of Medicine (M.D.) degree from Pierre-and-Marie-Curie University (Paris VI), specializing in nutrition and tropical diseases. In 1995, she completed a diploma in public administration at École Nationale d'Administration (ENA) in Paris, an institution known for training senior government officials. Later, in 2004, she participated in the executive program "Leaders in Development: Managing Economic and Policy Reforms" at the Harvard Kennedy School.

== Awards ==
In 2014, she was honored as one of nine women leaders receiving the "Most Outstanding Women Award" from the Asia-Pacific Economic Cooperation (APEC) Women Leadership Forum.
