= Lam Chea =

Cambodian politician

Lam Chea is a Cambodian politician who served as Cambodia's Minister in Charge of the State Secretariat of Border Affairs since 2023. He previously served as secretary of the Interior Ministry of State.

== Education ==
Chea was educated in France at the Université Lumiéres Lyon II, where he received his Masters of Public Law and his Bachelor of Law.

== State Secretariat of Border Affairs ==
=== Alleged land loss to Vietnam ===
In September 2024, Chea addressed the confusion from false news about land loss to Vietnam. He stated that a map cited by some sources were completely inaccurate. In an interview on Cambodian National Television, he rejected former opposition leader Sam Rainsy's claims of border post shifts with Vietnam, stating that Cambodia’s borders are determined by historical maps and international law, not Google Maps.

=== Cambodia–Thailand border conflict ===
In March 2025, Chea led his first visit to the disputed Thailand-Cambodia border area meeting Cambodian military soldiers. In June 2025, he headed the negotiations with Thailand after both Cambodia and Thailand reduced border tensions at the Chong Bok area.
