= Keo Rottanak =

Cambodian minister of Mines and Energy

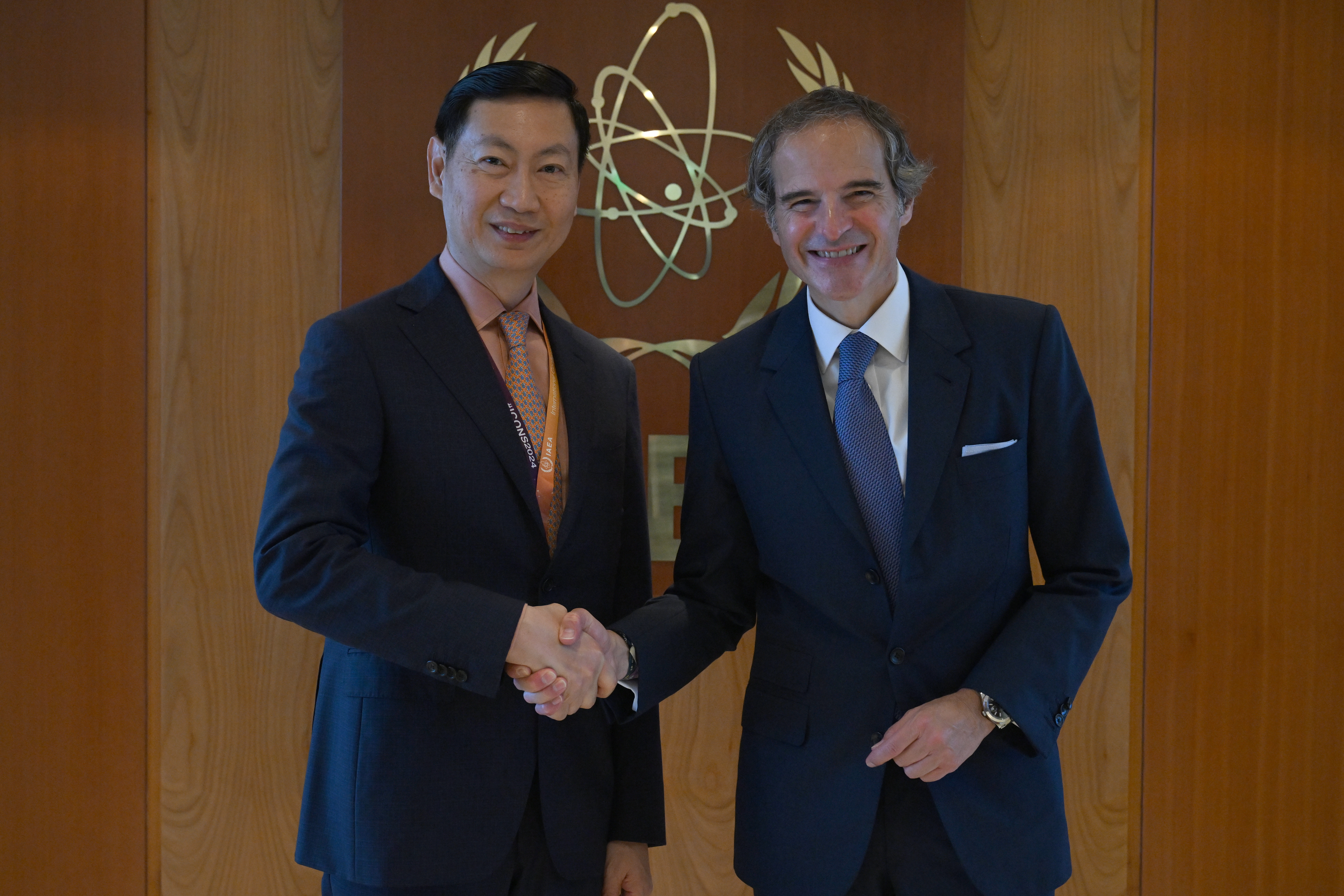
- Keo Rottanak with Rafael Grossi, Director-General of the International Atomic Energy Agency, Vienna, May 2024

Minister of Mines and Energy
- Incumbent
- Assumed office 22 August 2023
- Prime Minister: Hun Manet
- Preceded by: Suy Sem

Director-General of Electricité du Cambodge
- In office 3 March 2008 – 22 August 2023
- Prime Minister: Hun Sen
- Succeeded by: Praing Chulasa

Personal details
- Born: 16 September 1973 (age 53)
- Party: Cambodian People's Party
- Education: Columbia University; International University of Japan

Keo Rottanak (Khmer: កែវ រតនៈ; born 16 September 1973) is a Cambodian politician who is the current Minister of Mines and Energy. Previously, he served as the director-general of Cambodia's state-run electricity provider, Electricité du Cambodge (EDC).

== Government activities ==
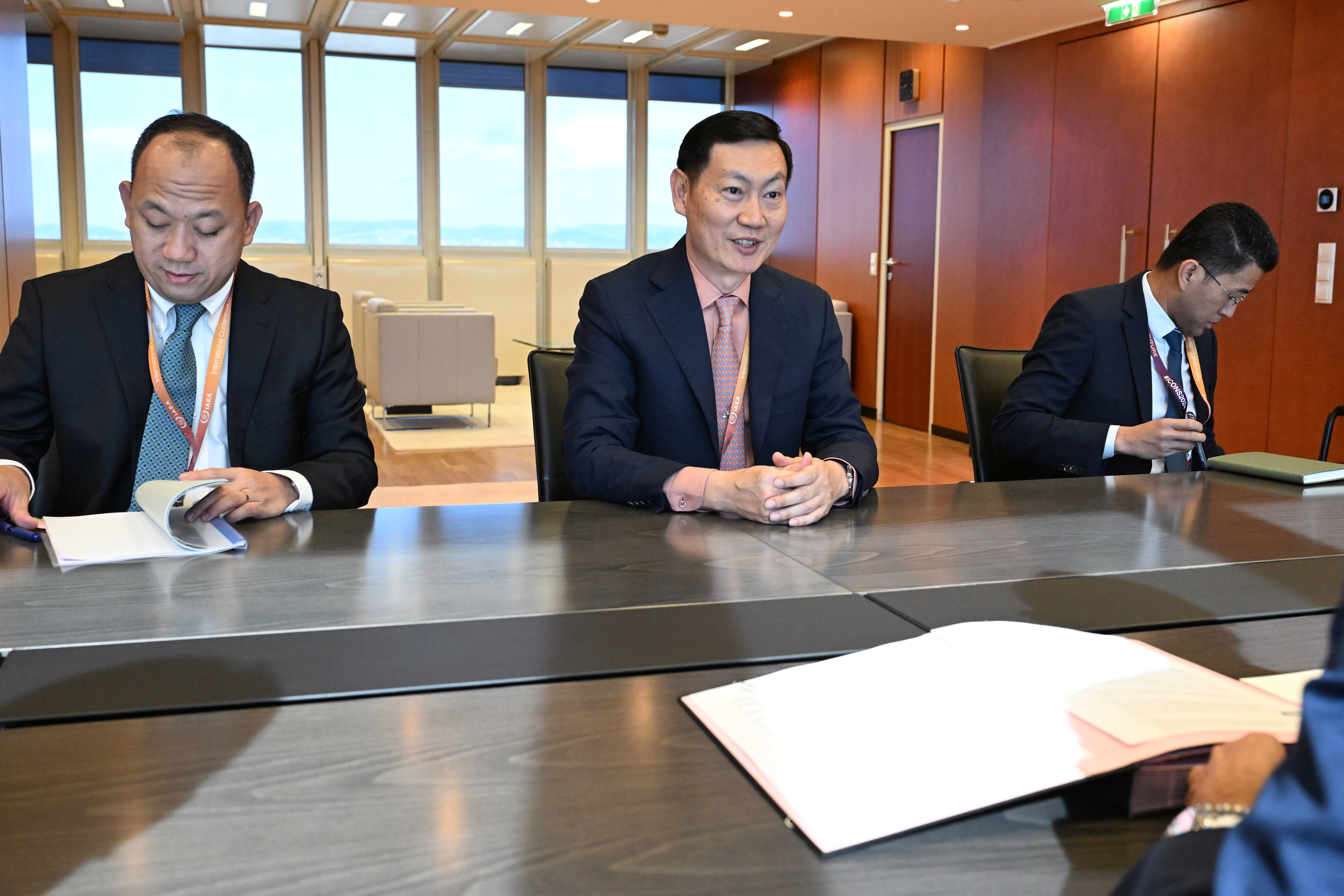
Rottanak (center) in an IAEA meeting in 2024

=== Renewable energies ===
As the Director-General of the EDC, Rottanak advocated for focusing on renewable energy rather than hydroelectric power. Before 2020, several projects were approved by Council Ministers and in progress, including new facilities in Pursat and Kampong Chhnang provinces, as Cambodia planned to generate 70MW from solar power by 2020. In 2024, Rottanak stated that Cambodia will be 70% dependent on renewable energies by 2030.

=== Mining ===
In August 2024, Rottanak highlighted a major growth in Cambodia's mining industry, with a 250 percent revenue increase since 2022. However, he noted concerns about social and environmental impacts. To tackle these issues, the Cambodian government created a Sand Resource Management Committee in September to oversee dredging operations. In March 2025, Rottanak warned that government officials or Cambodian People's Party members involved in sand and rock business who engage in tax evasion will face legal action.
