= Hun Manith =

Cambodian general

- Born: 17 October 1981 (age 44); Phnom Penh, People's Republic of Kampuchea
- Education: Hofstra University; Deakin University
- Spouse: Hok Chendavy
- Military career
- Allegiance: Cambodia
- Branch: Royal Cambodian Army
- Service years: 2009–present
- Rank: Lieutenant general
- Unit: Chief of Intelligence Department
- Commands: Deputy Commander of the Royal Cambodian Army

Hun Manith (Khmer: ហ៊ុន ម៉ាណិត; born 17 October 1981) is a lieutenant general in the Royal Cambodian Armed Forces (RCAF). He is the brother of the current prime minister Hun Manet and the fourth child of former prime minister Hun Sen. He is currently chief of the Defence Ministry's Intelligence Department. He is married to Hok Chendavy, the daughter of former National Police Commissioner Hok Lundy.
