= Cham Nimul =

Cambodian politician

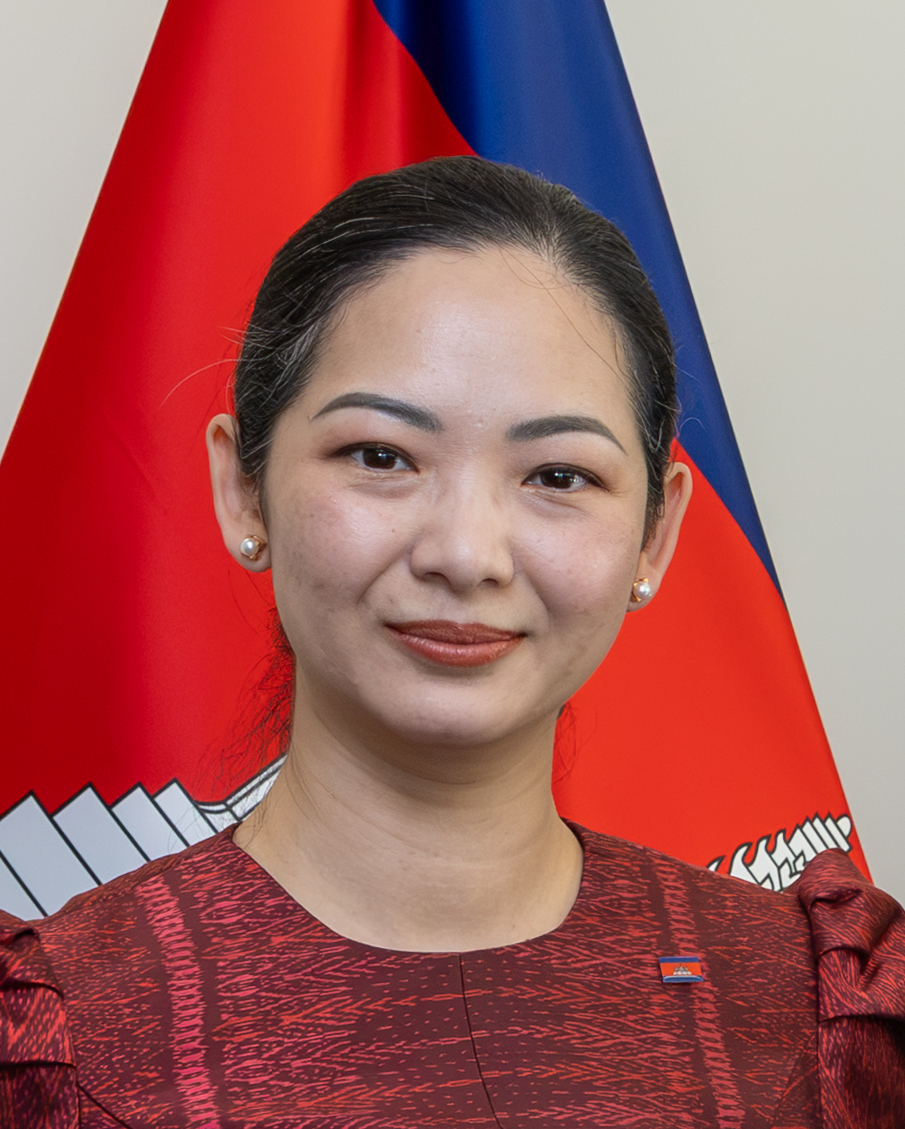
- Cham in 2026

Minister of Commerce
- Incumbent
- Assumed office 22 August 2023
- Prime Minister: Hun Manet
- Preceded by: Pan Sorasak

Director of Cabinet of the Ministry of Commerce
- In office 2004–2013

Personal details
- Party: Cambodian People's Party
- Parent(s): Cham Prasidh; Tep Bopha
- Education: University of St. Thomas; Sunway University

Cham Nimul is a Cambodian politician who served as Minister of Commerce since 2023. She is the daughter of former cabinet minister and longtime commerce minister Cham Prasidh.

== Education ==
In her education, Nimul received two bachelor's degrees from the University of St. Thomas, United States: Bachelor of Arts in Social Science and her Bachelor of Science in International Economics. She received her master's degree in public policy from Sunway University in Malaysia.

== Career ==
From 2004, she was the Director of Cabinet of the Ministry of Commerce until 2013, becoming Undersecretary of State of the Ministry of Commerce. In 2018, she was then promoted as Secretary of State of the Ministry of Commerce and was appointed as Cambodia's Minister of Commerce since August 2023.

Aside from her political career, she is a board of trustee of Hun Many's The Many Foundation and an honorary chairwoman of the Union of Youth Federations of Cambodia Commerce Sector.
