= Ministry of Commerce (Cambodia) =

Government ministry of Cambodia

- ក្រសួងពាណិជ្ជកម្ម

Agency overview
- Formed: 1996
- Jurisdiction: Government of Cambodia
- Headquarters: Phnom Penh, Cambodia
- Minister responsible: Cham Nimul, Minister of Commerce
- Website: moc.gov.kh

The Ministry of Commerce (Khmer: ក្រសួងពាណិជ្ជកម្ម) is the government ministry responsible for regulating and promoting commerce and trade of Cambodia. It works both domestically and internationally, and within the context of ASEAN, not only to create job opportunities, but also a good working environment for producers and exporters.

== General Departments ==
- General Department of Domestic Trade
- General Department of International Trade
- General Department of Trade Support Services
- General Directorate of Trade Promotion
- General Department of Cambodia Import-Export Inspection and Fraud Repression (CamControl)
- General Department of Administration and Finance
- General Department of Inspection
- Green Trade Company

== Minister of Commerce ==
Minister	Term start	Term end
Mok Sokun	8 January 1979	9 April 1979
Ros Samay	15 May 1979	December 1979
Taing Sarim	December 1979	5 March 1985
Chan Phin	5 March 1985	24 May 1986
Ho Non	24 May 1986	20 August 1988
Taing Sarim	20 August 1988	9 August 1990
Nhim Vanda	9 August 1990	7 June 1993
Var Huot	7 June 1993	24 October 1994
Cham Prasidh	24 October 1994	24 September 2013
Sun Chanthol	24 September 2013	2 April 2016
Pan Sorasak	2 April 2016	22 August 2023
Cham Nimul	22 August 2023	Incumbent

Source: History of the Ministry of Commerce

== See also ==
- Economy of Cambodia
- Government of Cambodia
- Pan Sorasak
