= Aun Pornmoniroth =

Cambodian politician and economist

His Excellency Dr. Aun Pornmoniroth
- អូន ព័ន្ធមុនីរ័ត្ន
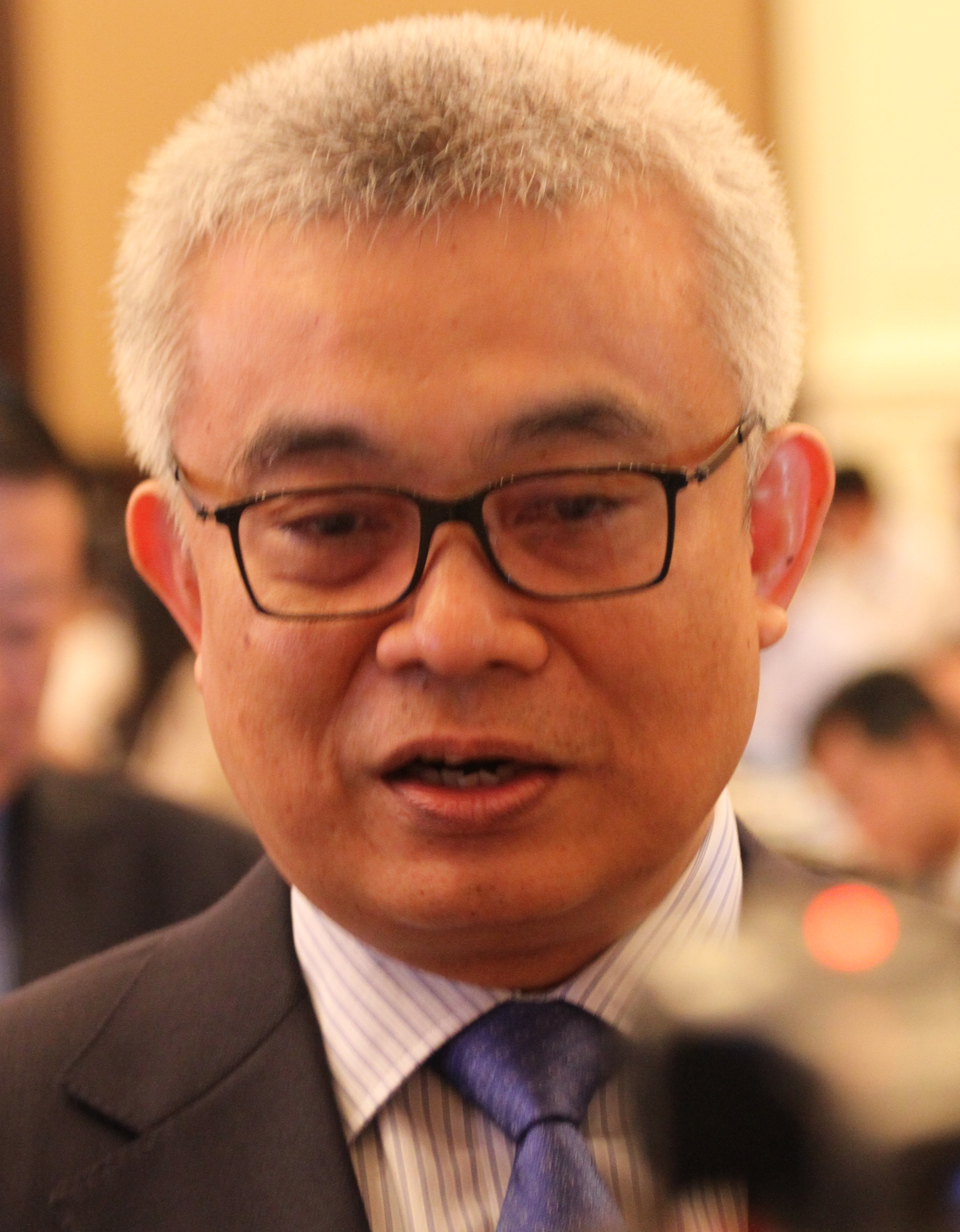
- Pornmoniroth in 2016

Economic Adviser to the Prime Minister
- In office 1998–2013

Deputy Prime Minister of Cambodia
- Incumbent
- Assumed office 6 September 2018
- Prime Minister: Hun Sen; Hun Manet
- Serving with: See list: Neth Savoeun Sun Chanthol Hang Chuon Naron Koeut Rith Sok Chenda Sophea Say Sam Al Sar Sokha Tea Seiha Vongsey Vissoth Hun Many

Minister of Economy and Finance
- Incumbent
- Assumed office 24 September 2013
- Prime Minister: Hun Sen; Hun Manet
- Preceded by: Keat Chhon

Member of the National Assembly
- Incumbent
- Assumed office 5 September 2018
- Constituency: Kandal

Personal details
- Born: 1 October 1965 (age 60) Phnom Penh, Cambodia
- Party: Cambodian People's Party
- Education: Moscow State University (MA, PhD)
- Website: Government website

Aun Pornmoniroth (Khmer: អូន ព័ន្ធមុនីរ័ត្ន; born 1 October 1965) is a Cambodian politician and economist, currently serving as the Minister of Economy and Finance and Deputy Prime Minister. He was the Economic Adviser to the Prime Minister from 1998 to 2013. Before his appointment as minister, he worked in the Ministry of Economy and Finance as Secretary of State. He is also a Member of Parliament (MP) for Kandal Province, first elected in 2018.

== Life and career ==
Aun Pornmoniroth was born in 1965 in Cambodia's capital, Phnom Penh. An economist, he has served in the Ministry of Economy and Finance of Cambodia since 1994. His first post began in September 1993, as the assistant to Prime Minister Hun Sen until February 1994. In December 1998, he became Economic Adviser to the Prime Minister, with the rank of Secretary of State. On 6 February 1999, he was appointed as the Secretary-General of the Ministry of Economy and Finance. He is a member of the Board of Governors of the Royal School of Administration and the National Bank of Cambodia.

In 2013, he was chosen to succeed outgoing finance minister Keat Chhon and assumed the office on 24 September 2013. Moniroth is also the Chairman of the Supreme National Economic Council (since September 2001).

In 2020, he was mentioned as a potential candidate to be prime minister, before the CPP eventually selected Hun Manet in December 2021. Prior to this, there were reportedly plans for Aun Pornmoniroth to be a transitional prime minister before eventually handing over to Hun Manet, similar to the role of Goh Chok Tong before handing over to Lee Hsien Loong.

== Academic achievements ==
Aun is a graduate of the Moscow State University where he received a Doctor of Philosophy in social and political sciences. He is fluent in English and Russian.

== Personal life ==
Aun Pornmoniroth is married to Im Paulika, and has 4 Children.

== Awards and honours ==
- Grand Order of National Merit, February 2010
- Grand Cross of the Order of HM The Queen Kossamak Neariroth, February 2010
- Grand Cross of the Royal Order of Sowathara, September 2008
- Grand Officer of the Royal Order of Cambodia, April 2003

Political offices
Preceded by Keat Chhon	Minister of Economy and Finance; 2013–present	Incumbent
