= Ministry of Rural Development (Cambodia) =

Government ministry of Cambodia

- ក្រសួងអភិវឌ្ឍន៍ជនបទ

Agency overview
- Jurisdiction: Government of Cambodia
- Headquarters: 771-773 Monivong Blvd (93), Phnom Penh
- Minister responsible: Chhay Rithisen, Minister of Rural Development
- Website: mrd.gov.kh

The Ministry of Rural Development is a government ministry that governs in development of rural areas of Cambodia.
