= Hun Manet =

Prime Minister of Cambodia since 2023

Samdech Moha Borvor Thipadei Hun Manet
- ហ៊ុន ម៉ាណែត
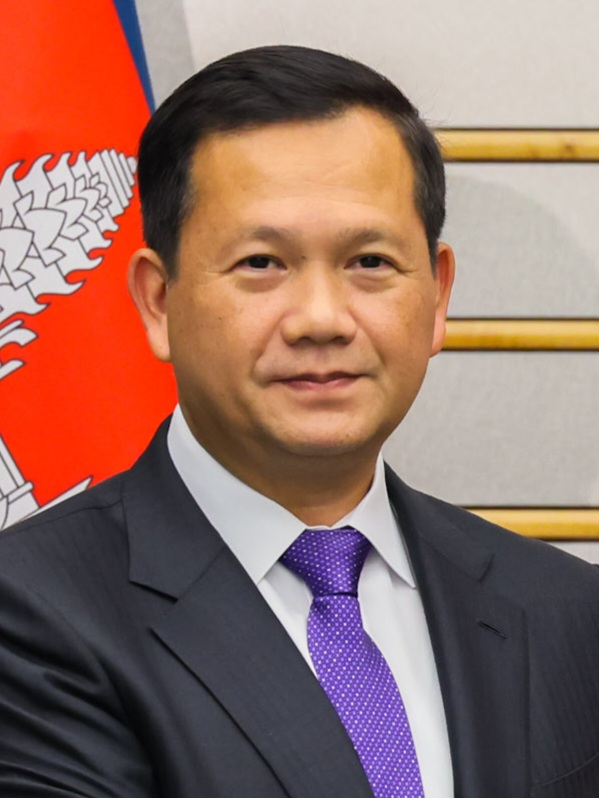
- Manet in 2025

Prime Minister of Cambodia
- Incumbent
- Assumed office 22 August 2023
- Monarch: Norodom Sihamoni
- Deputy: See list: Aun Pornmoniroth; Vongsey Vissoth; Sar Sokha; Tea Seiha; Hangchuon Naron; Sok Chenda Sophea; Keut Rith; Say Sam Al; Sun Chanthol; Neth Savoeun; Hun Many; Prak Sokhonn
- Preceded by: Hun Sen

Chief of Military
- De facto c. 2018–c. 2021

Vice President of the Cambodian People's Party
- Incumbent
- Assumed office 10 December 2023
- President: Hun Sen
- Serving with: Sar Kheng (2015–present); Say Chhum (2015–present); Tea Banh (2021–present); Men Sam An (2021–present)
- Preceded by: Hun Sen (2015)

Member of the National Assembly
- Incumbent
- Assumed office 21 August 2023
- Constituency: Phnom Penh

Deputy Commander-in-Chief of the Royal Royal Cambodian Armed Forces
- In office July 2018 – 2023
- Preceded by: Unknown
- Succeeded by: Unknown

Personal details
- Born: 20 October 1977 (age 49) Memot, Kampong Cham, Democratic Kampuchea
- Party: Cambodian People's Party
- Spouse: Pich Chanmony (m. 2006)
- Children: 3
- Parents: Hun Sen; Bun Rany
- Relatives: Hun Manith (brother); Hun Many (brother)
- Education: United States Military Academy (BS); New York University (MA); University of Bristol (PhD)
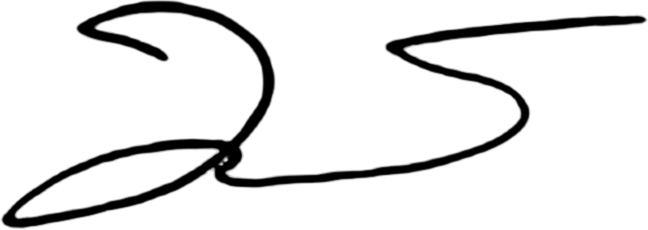
- Signature
- Website: hunmanet.kh

Military service
- Branch/service: Royal Cambodian Army
- Years of service: 1995–2023
- Rank: General
- Commands: Deputy Commander-in-Chief of the Royal Cambodian Armed Forces (2018–2023); Commander of the Royal Cambodian Army (2018–2023); Commander of the Prime Minister's Bodyguard Unit; Chief of Joint Staffs of the Royal Cambodian Armed Forces; Head of the National Counter-Terrorism Task Force
- Battles/wars: 2008–2013 Cambodian–Thai border crisis
- Awards: Grand Cross of the Royal Order of Cambodia; National Defence Medal

Hun Manet (Note: Khmer: ហ៊ុន ម៉ាណែត, Hŭn Manêt [hun maː.naet]) (born 20 October 1977) is a Cambodian politician and military officer who has served as Prime Minister of Cambodia and Vice President of the ruling Cambodian People's Party (CPP) since 2023. He is the second child of Senate president and former prime minister Hun Sen and Bun Rany.

Manet grew up in Phnom Penh, where he received his general education before joining the Royal Cambodian Armed Forces (RCAF) in 1995. That same year, he was admitted to the United States Military Academy at West Point, becoming the first Cambodian to graduate from the academy in 1999. Prior to entering politics, he served in the Royal Cambodian Army (RCA), rising to the position of the Royal Cambodian Army and later even becoming the deputy commander-in-chief of the Royal Cambodian Armed Forces.

Following the 2023 general election, his father announced his resignation as prime minister on 26 July, designating Manet as his successor. After receiving a royal nomination from King Norodom Sihamoni, Manet and his cabinet were unanimously approved by the National Assembly and formally sworn into office on 22 August 2023. As prime minister, he has overseen major infrastructure projects such as the construction of the Funan Techo Canal and the completion of Siem Reap–Angkor International Airport and Techo International Airport. His government has also managed challenges including U.S. tariffs on Cambodian goods and the Cambodia–Thailand border conflict.

== Early life and education ==
Hun Manet was born on 20 October 1977 in Koh Thmar village, Memot District, Kampong Cham Province (Tboung Khmoum Today), in the Khmer Rouge-ruled Democratic Kampuchea as the second son of Hun Sen and Bun Rany. He is of Teochew Chinese heritage through his paternal grandfather Hun Neang. His maternal grandparents were also of Chinese descent. According to Sen, on the night of Manet's birth, a bright light flew over the roof of the house leading Sen to believe that his son was born from a supernatural being worshipped in Koh Thmar village.

Manet grew up and received his general education in Phnom Penh and later joined the Royal Cambodian Armed Forces (RCAF) in 1995, the same year he entered the United States Military Academy. Having received his diploma in May 1999, he became the first Cambodian academy graduate and one of only seven foreign cadets to graduate that year. Upon graduation from West Point, he received his bachelor's degree in economics and a commission as a lieutenant in the Royal Cambodian Army (RCA). He also received a Master of Arts in economics from New York University in 2002 and a Doctor of Philosophy in economics from the University of Bristol in 2009. His doctoral thesis was titled "What determines the firm size distribution and structural integration? A cross-county study".

== Military service ==
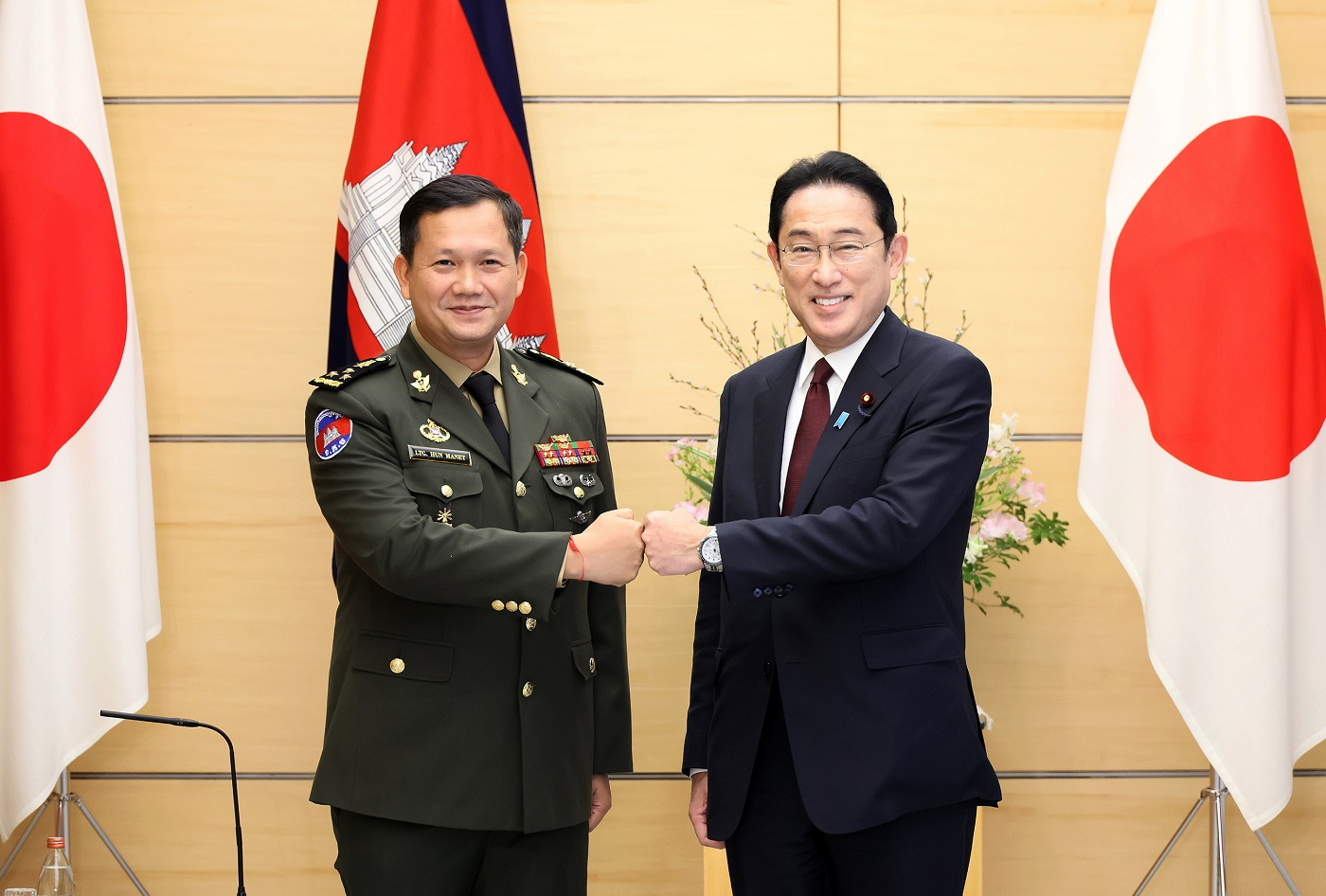
Hun Manet, as lieutenant general, meets with Japanese prime minister Fumio Kishida in Tokyo, 16 February 2022.

Manet joined the RCAF in 1995, the same year he entered the United States Military Academy. He became a major general in January 2011, just months after being named deputy commander of the Royal Cambodian Army and deputy chief of the RCAF Joint Staff. Manet played a prominent role in negotiations during the 2008 Cambodian–Thai stand-off. He became a lieutenant general in June 2013 and was later promoted to a four-star general in July 2018, coinciding with his new responsibilities as deputy commander-in-chief of the RCAF. His younger brother, Hun Manith, also serves in the RCAF, as a brigadier general. On 20 April 2023, Manet was officially promoted to four-star general. Minister of Defence Tea Banh described Manet's promotion as a reflection of his efforts to "serve the nation, military and Cambodian people".

On 30 June 2018, weeks before the parliamentary elections, Hun Sen appointed Manet to higher military positions in a bid to prepare his son for the premiership when he retired from politics or died, effectively solidifying the Hun political dynasty in Cambodia. Hun Sen had mentioned Manet as his potential successor.

== Political career ==
In June 2020, Manet was promoted to head of the CPP's youth wing.

He had been mentioned by both media outlets and Hun Sen himself as a candidate for prime minister. On 4 December 2021, Manet was unanimously elected by the CPP Central Committee to be the party's future candidate for prime minister after Hun Sen, making him the prime minister-in-waiting.

On 7 August 2023, King Norodom Sihamoni issued a royal decree appointing Manet as Prime Minister of Cambodia and commissioning Manet to form a cabinet.

Shortly after his rise to the premiership, Manet hosted Universal Peace Federation's delegation, a South Korean organization started by Unification Church founder Sun Myung Moon, at the Peace Palace.

== Premiership ==
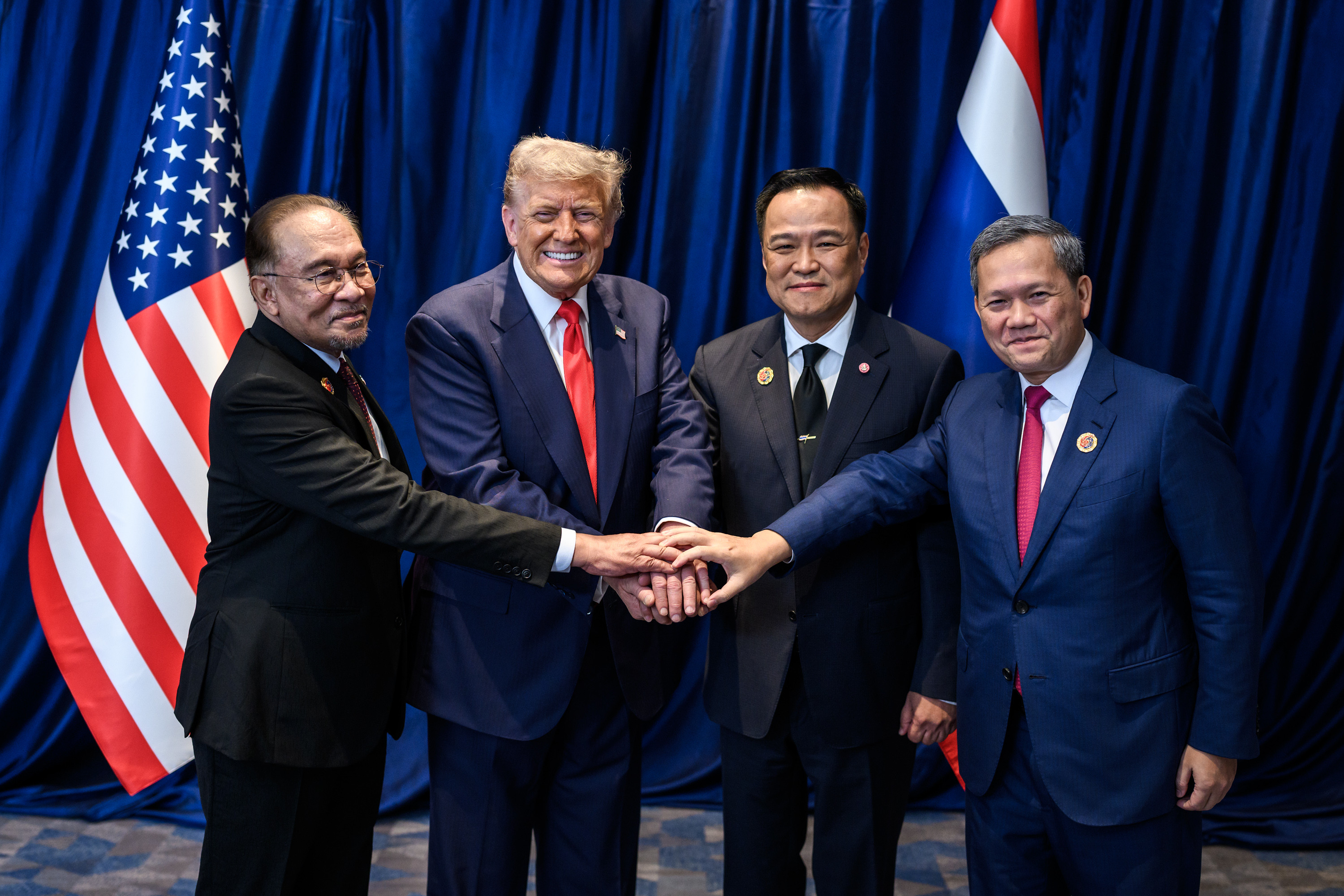
Manet with Malaysian Prime Minister Anwar Ibrahim, US President Donald Trump, and Thai Prime Minister Anutin Charnvirakul after the signing of the "Kuala Lumpur Peace Accords" in Kuala Lumpur, Malaysia, 26 October 2025.

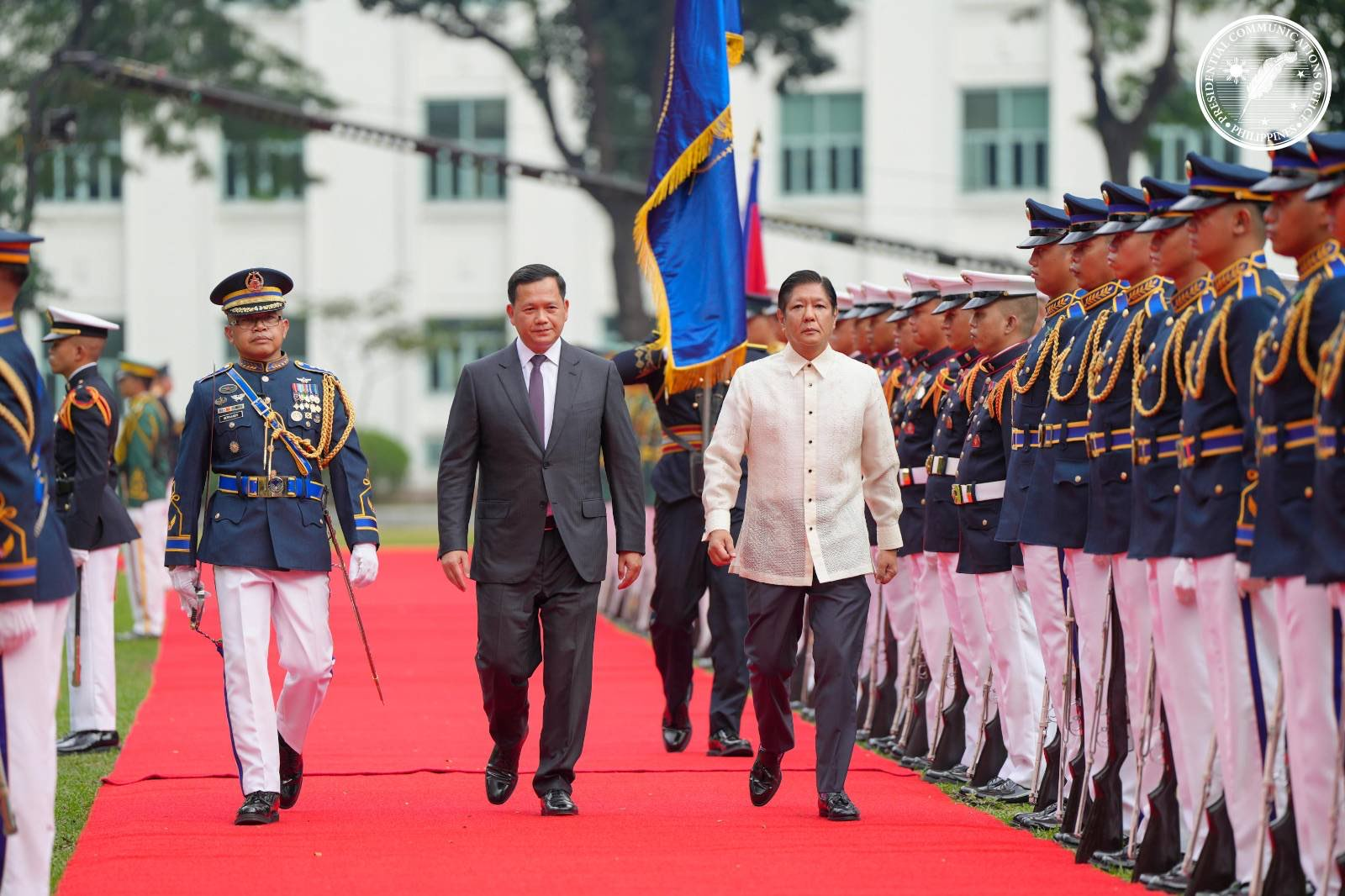
With Philippine president Bongbong Marcos in Manila, 11 February 2025.

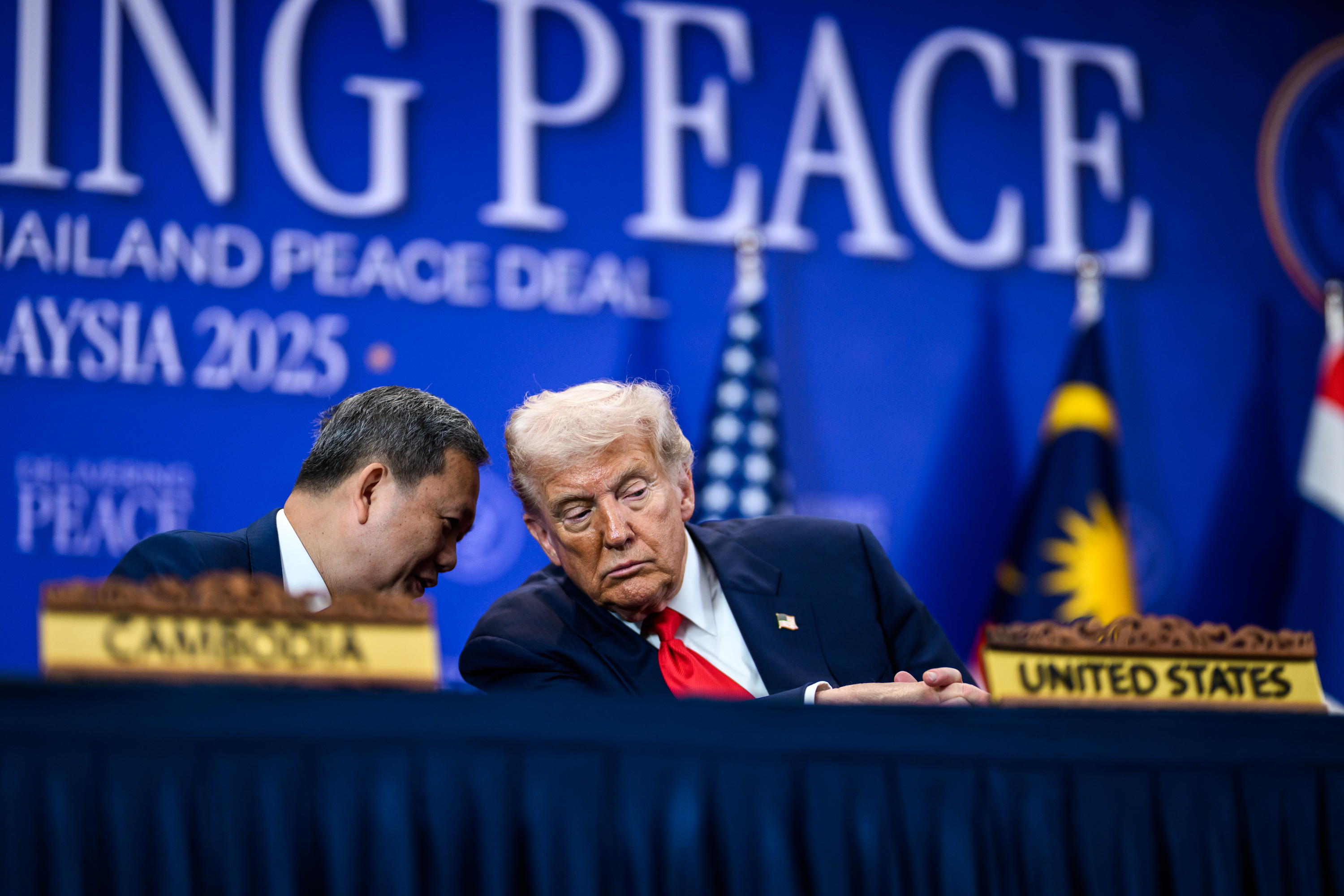
Manet speaks with US President Donald Trump prior to the signing of the Kuala Lumpur Peace Accord, 26 October 2025

Hun Sen publicly announced his endorsement of Manet's candidacy for prime minister for the first time in December 2021. Although Manet never publicly expressed interest in the role, he received strong support from several government ministers and party members as well as the influential CPP Standing Committee.

Manet stood as a first-ranked candidate in Phnom Penh for the National Assembly in the 2023 general election, a requirement to be appointed prime minister. Three days after the election in which the CPP claimed a landslide victory, Hun Sen announced his resignation and confirmed that Manet would be the new prime minister. The new cabinet was sworn in on 22 August. Upon appointment as prime minister, Manet was granted the highest civilian honorary title of Samdech Moha Borvor Thipadei Hun Manet (Khmer Romanization Samțec Mahapavaradhipatī Hun Manet) (Khmer: សម្តេចមហាបវរធិបតី; (Note: UNGEGN: Sâmdéch Môhabâvôrôthĭbâtei Hŭn Manêt ALA-LC: Samṭec Mahāpavaradhipatī H′un M″āṇaet IPA: [sɑmɗác mɔhaːɓɑːʋɑːtʰɨpaɗəj hun maːnaet]) meaning "Great Lord and Supreme Leader Hun Manet").

The election was widely criticized by international observers as being held in a restrictive political environment and neither free nor fair; the main opposition party was disqualified two months before the election, and an opposition leader was imprisoned. On 7 August, King Norodom Sihamoni issued a royal decree officially nominating Manet as the new prime minister. He invited Manet to form a new government for the seventh mandate, subject to a vote of confidence from the National Assembly on 22 August. Manet's cabinet was confirmed unanimously by the National Assembly on 22 August. In February 2024, Manet promoted his younger brother Hun Many to deputy prime minister alongside his current role as civil service minister.

One of Manet's official acts as prime minister was to ban musical truck horns in March 2024, saying he was disturbed by “dancing on the street to the musical beats of big cars”. Manet also instructed authorities to upgrade rail transport across Cambodia. On 5 August 2024, his administration launched the controversial Funan Techo Canal Project which would link the Mekong River to Cambodia's coast, significantly reducing the country's reliance on Vietnamese ports. The Cambodia–Laos–Vietnam Development Triangle Area (CLV-DTA) has also come under public scrutiny over concerns that four of the country's provinces would be ceded to its neighbours. Cambodia eventually withdrew from CLV-DTA on 23 September.

In July 2025, his government passed legislation allowing for citizenship to be revoked, targeting those who conspire with foreign nations.

=== Thailand border clash ===
As prime minister, Manet presided over an escalation of the 2025 Cambodia–Thailand border conflict in July. On 7 August, Manet nominated U.S. president Donald Trump for a Nobel Peace Prize following his role in facilitating a ceasefire. On 26 October, Manet and Thai prime minister Anutin Charnvirakul officially signed the "Kuala Lumpur Peace Accord", witnessed by Malaysian prime minister Anwar Ibrahim and U.S. president Donald Trump.

== Personal life ==
Hun Manet is married to Pich Chanmony, the daughter of Pich Sophoan, a former secretary of state at the Ministry of Labour. One of his cousins is Cambodian businessman Hun To, who has been identified as a director of Huione Pay within Huione Group.

== Electoral history ==
=== National Assembly ===
Election	List	No.	Constituency	Votes			Result
Election	List	No.	Constituency	Total	%	Rank	Result
2023	CPP	1	Phnom Penh	627,436	82.26%	1st	Elected

== See also ==
- Political family
- Nepotism
- Kleptocracy

Political offices
Preceded by Hun Sen	Prime Minister of Cambodia; 2023–present	Incumbent
