= Neth Savoeun =

Cambodian politician

General Neth Savoeun
- នេត សាវឿន
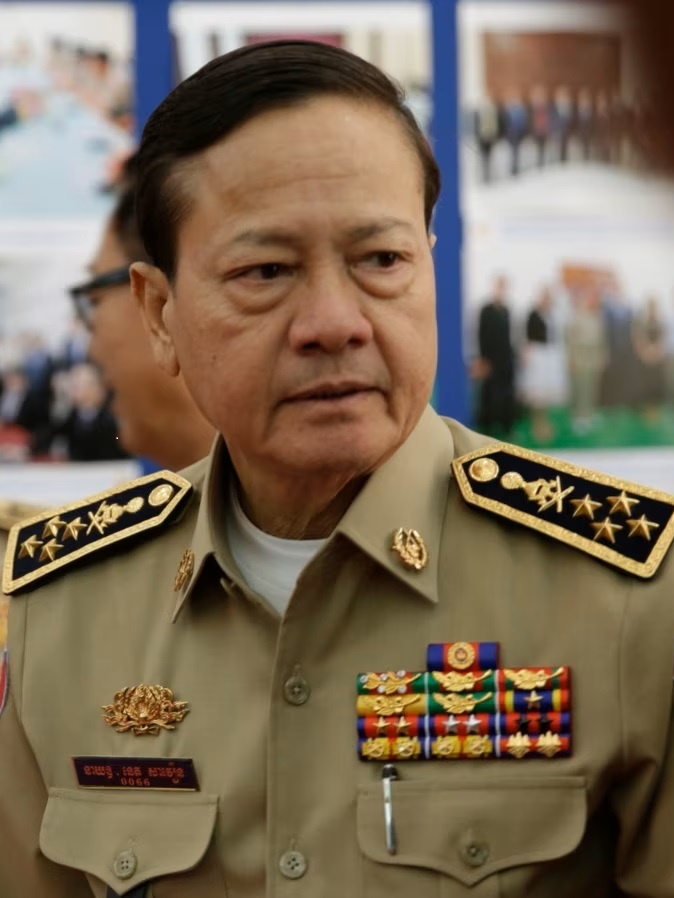
- Savoeun in 2018

Deputy Prime Minister of Cambodia
- Incumbent
- Assumed office 22 August 2023
- Prime Minister: Hun Manet
- Serving with: See list: Aun Pornmoniroth Sun Chanthol Hang Chuon Naron Koeut Rith Sok Chenda Sophea Say Sam Al Sar Sokha Tea Seiha Vongsey Vissoth Hun Many

Commissioner-General of the Cambodian National Police
- In office November 2008 – 22 August 2023
- Preceded by: Hok Lundy
- Succeeded by: Sar Thet

Deputy Commissioner-General of the Cambodian National Police
- In office Unknown – November 2008

Head of Penal Crime Division's Justice Department
- In office 1993–Unknown

Commissioner of Phnom Penh Police
- In office 1989–1993

Personal details
- Born: 1956
- Party: Cambodian People's Party
- Spouse: Hun Kimleng
- Profession: Politician, police

Military service
- Allegiance: Cambodia
- Branch/service: Royal Cambodian Army; Cambodian National Police
- Rank: General

Neth Savoeun (Khmer: នេត សាវឿន) is a deputy prime minister of Cambodia, serving under prime minister Hun Manet. He previously served as the National Police Chief from 2008 to 2023. Savoeun was promoted from Deputy National Police Chief to the most senior law enforcement position of the country in November 2008 after his predecessor, Hok Lundy, whose tenure was mired in controversy and accusations of corruption, died in a helicopter crash. Savoeun, who was 52 years old at the time of his appointment, is married to Prime Minister Hun Sen's niece, Hun Kimleng. Prior to the National Police force, Savoeun was the police chief of Phnom Penh during the State of Cambodia and then, after the 1993 elections, head of the justice department in the Interior Ministry’s Penal Crimes Division.

== Background ==
Savoeun is a long-time member of the ruling Cambodian People's Party, which, according to international observers, has dominated politics and held on to power in Cambodia since 1979 through corruption, including extralegal killings, election fraud, control of the media, and at times, open violence such as the 1997 coup and 2015 intimidation of the opposition CNRP deputy leader, Kem Sokha. Within the CPP, Savoeun is a member of its Central Committee, the body responsible for all core decision making, and maintains close ties with Hun Sen, to whose niece he married in the early 1990s.

From 1989–1993, Savoeun was the city police chief in the capital, Phnom Penh during the turbulent transition period after the Vietnamese withdrew from Cambodia. After the UN's 1992–1993 protectorate led to elections and the formation of the current Kingdom of Cambodia, Savoeun was given a post in the Interior Ministry as the leader of the Penal Crimes Division's justice department. During the mid 2000s, he was made a Deputy Chief of the National Police Force. Throughout his career thus far, Savoeun had been plagued by accusations of "committing human rights abuses".

== Tenure as National Police Chief ==
Savoeun was chosen to succeed Hoc Lundy by Hun Sen and appointed by royal decree of Cambodian king Norodom Sihamoni on 11 November 2008. He was officially sworn into office on 21 November by Interior Minister Sar Kheng amid allegations of nepotism and lack of qualifications. Kem Sokha, who at the time was president of the Human Rights Party, remarked "...he has not graduated from the Police Academy, and his rank comes from his relations to a high-ranking official, or nepotism", but he and others such as Chan Soveth of ADHOC and Interior Minister Sar Kheng expressed hope that Savoeun would discontinue the practices of his predecessor and reform the organization even though the National Police had never been allowed to operate independently of the CPP-controlled government.

As police chief, Savoeun has made many overtures with the apparent goal of making Cambodia more secure. In March 2015 he took steps to deal with "foreign mafia" in Sihanoukville, which included replacing the Sihanoukville Province police chief, in response to increasing violence among high-profile Russian businessmen in the area. Also in March, Savoeun threatened to fire police officials for not acting to stop a series of brazen armed robberies of jewelry stores and tourists around the nation. Savoeun called a high-level meeting in September in which he announced plans to crack down on human trafficking, a nationwide problem in Cambodia. During an internal promotion ceremony in October 2015, Savoeun scolded police at all levels, saying they need to work better with citizens and "behave better" in general if they expect to be promoted.

Despite such high-profile efforts, however, the National Police force, and Savoeun in particular, are still used as tools of the CPP. Hun Sen and the CPP regularly use uniformed military and police leaders, including General Savoeun to campaign during elections. In August 2015 Hun Sen tasked Savoeun with arresting Teav Vannol, an outspoken senator of the opposition party for comments he made regarding Hun Sen's allegedly pro-Vietnamese interpretations of Cambodian-Vietnamese treaties. In 2010, Hun Sen sent Savoeun on a personal mission to track down the Prime Minister's nephew who had abandoned his wife. In October, after Savoeun's police ignored the calls of Kem Sokha's wife for help when her house was surrounded and pelted by rocks for six hours by a pro-CPP mob, Hun Sen announced that Savoeun would not accept being replaced if the CNRP won the next elections.

== Personal life ==
Savoeun is married to Hun Kimleng, the niece of Hun Sen, and has three daughters. Kimleng obtained Cypriot citizenship in November 2017, and the family's wealth and foreign passports have courted significant scrutiny. In 2017, the United States Department of State banned Savoeun and his immediate family members from traveling into the United States for "undermining democracy."
