= Ministry of Planning (Cambodia) =

Government ministry of Cambodia

- ក្រសួងផែនការ

Agency overview
- Jurisdiction: Royal Government of Cambodia
- Headquarters: 386 Preah Monivong Blvd, Phnom Penh
- Website: mop.gov.kh

The Ministry of Planning (MoP; Khmer: ក្រសួងផែនការ) is a government ministry responsible for socioeconomic planning and statistics management in Cambodia. The Ministry consists of two main parts; the General Directorate of Planning, and the National Institute of Statistics. The Ministry is located in Phnom Penh.

== See also ==
- Census
- Demographics
- Government of Cambodia
