= List of deputy prime ministers of Cambodia =

Deputy Prime Minister of the Kingdom of Cambodia
- ឧបនាយករដ្ឋមន្ត្រីនៃព្រះរាជាណាចក្រកម្ពុជា
- Seal of the Cabinet of Cambodia

- Flag of Cambodia
- Office of the Council of Ministers; Royal Government of Cambodia
- Style: His Excellency
- Member of: Council of Ministers
- Seat: Phnom Penh, Cambodia
- Appointer: Monarch by royal decree
- Term length: No fixed restrictions

This is a list of deputy prime minister of Cambodia (Khmer: ឧបនាយករដ្ឋមន្ត្រីនៃកម្ពុជា). There are currently ten holders of this position.

== List of deputy prime ministers ==
Portrait	Name	In office			Party
Portrait	Name	From	To	Duration	Party
	Lon Nol	1963	1966	2–3 years	Sangkum
	Sisowath Sirik Matak ស៊ីសុវត្ថិ សិរិមតៈ (1914–1975)	14 August 1969	9 October 1970	2 years, 268 days	Independent
	Sisowath Sirik Matak ស៊ីសុវត្ថិ សិរិមតៈ (1914–1975)	9 October 1970	11 March 1971	2 years, 268 days	FANK (ANK)
	Pan Sothy (?)	Unknown	c. 17 April 1975	Unknown	SRP
	Hang Thun Hak ហង្ស ធុនហាក់ (1926–1975)	Unknown	c. 17 April 1975	Unknown	SRP
	Son Sen សុន សេន (1930–1997)	14 April 1976	7 January 1979	2 years, 268 days	CPK
	Hun Sen ហ៊ុន សែន (b. 1952)	1981	1985	3–4 years	KPRP
	Bou Thang ប៊ូ ថង (1938–2019)	1982	1992	9–10 years	KPRP
	Chea Soth ជា សុទ្ធ (1928–2012)	1982	1992	9–10 years	KPRP
	Sar Kheng ស ខេង (b. 1951)	6 February 1992	22 August 2023	31 years, 197 days	CPP
	Hor Namhong ហោ ណាំហុង (b. 1935)	16 July 2004	22 August 2023	19 years, 37 days	CPP
	Tea Banh ទៀ បាញ់ (b. 1945)	16 July 2004	22 August 2023	19 years, 37 days	CPP
	Bin Chhin ប៊ិន ឈិន (b. 1949)	5 September 2007	22 August 2023	15 years, 351 days	CPP
	Men Sam An ម៉ែន សំអន (b. 1953)	25 September 2008	22 August 2023	14 years, 331 days	CPP
	Yim Chhaily យឹម ឆៃលី (b. 1950)	25 September 2008	22 August 2023	14 years, 331 days	CPP
	Ke Kim Yan កែ គឹមយ៉ាន	12 March 2009	22 August 2023	14 years, 163 days	CPP
	Chea Sophara ជា សុផារ៉ា (b. 1953)	6 September 2018	22 August 2023	4 years, 350 days	CPP
	Prak Sokhonn ប្រាក់ សុខុន (b. 1954)	6 September 2018	22 August 2023	4 years, 350 days	CPP

=== Currently in office ===
Portrait	Name	In office			Party
Portrait	Name	From	To	Duration	Party
	Aun Pornmoniroth អូន ព័ន្ធមុនីរ័ត្ន (b. 1965)	6 September 2018	present	8 years, 1 day	CPP
	Prak Sokhonn ប្រាក់ សុខុន (b. 1954)	20 November 2024	present	1 year, 291 days	CPP
	Neth Savoeun នេត សាវឿន (b. 1956)	22 August 2023	present	3 years, 16 days	CPP
	Sun Chanthol ស៊ុន ចាន់ថុល (b. 1956)	22 August 2023	present	3 years, 16 days	CPP
	Hang Chuon Naron ហង់ ជួនណារ៉ុន (b. 1962)	22 August 2023	present	3 years, 16 days	CPP
	Say Sam Al សាយ សំអាល់ (b. 1980)	22 August 2023	present	3 years, 16 days	CPP
	Sar Sokha ស សុខា (b. 1981)	22 August 2023	present	3 years, 16 days	CPP
	Tea Seiha ទៀ សីហា (b. 1980)	22 August 2023	present	3 years, 16 days	CPP
	Koeut Rith កើត រិទ្ធ (b. 1979)	22 August 2023	present	3 years, 16 days	CPP
	Sok Chenda Sophea សុខ ចិន្ដាសោភា (b. 1956)	22 August 2023	present	3 years, 16 days	CPP
	Vongsey Vissoth វង្សី វិស្សុត (b. 1965)	22 August 2023	present	3 years, 16 days	CPP
	Hun Many ហ៊ុន ម៉ានី (b. 1982)	21 February 2024	present	2 years, 198 days	CPP
	Kuy Sophal គុយ សុផល (b. 1956)	2 September 2024	present	2 years, 5 days	CPP
