= Sun Chanthol =

Cambodian politician

His Excellency Sun Chanthol
- ស៊ុន ចាន់ថុល
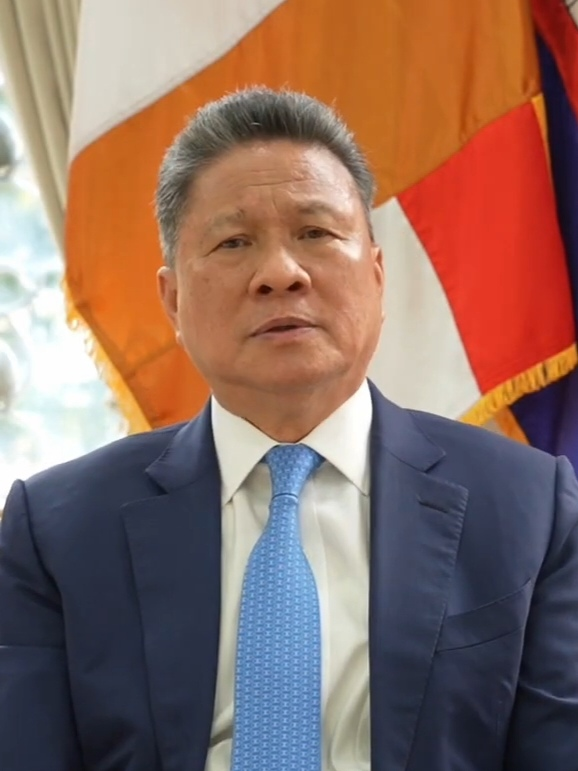
- Chanthol in 2026

Deputy Prime Minister of Cambodia
- Incumbent
- Assumed office 22 August 2023
- Prime Minister: Hun Manet
- Serving with: See list: Aun Pornmoniroth Neth Savoeun Hang Chuon Naron Koeut Rith Sok Chenda Sophea Say Sam Al Sar Sokha Tea Seiha Vongsey Vissoth Hun Many

Minister of Public Works and Transport
- In office 5 April 2016 – 22 August 2023
- Prime Minister: Hun Sen
- Preceded by: Tram Iv Tek
- Succeeded by: Peng Ponea
- In office 16 July 2004 – 24 September 2008
- Prime Minister: Hun Sen
- Preceded by: Khy Taing Lim
- Succeeded by: Tram Iv Tek

Minister of Commerce
- In office 24 September 2013 – 4 April 2016
- Prime Minister: Hun Sen
- Preceded by: Cham Prasidh
- Succeeded by: Pan Sorasak

Personal details
- Born: 30 June 1956 (age 70) Phnom Penh, Cambodia
- Citizenship: Cambodia; United States
- Party: Cambodian People's Party (since 2009); FUNCINPEC (until 2009)
- Spouse: Sun Sotha
- Children: 3
- Education: Kogod School of Business (BS); Wharton School of the University of Pennsylvania; Harvard Kennedy School (MPA)
- Website: Government website

Sun Chanthol (Khmer: ស៊ុន ចាន់ថុល; born 30 June 1956) is a Cambodian politician currently serving as Deputy Prime Minister. He was the Minister for Public Works and Transport from 2016 to 2023 and previously from 2004 to 2008. He was formerly Minister for Commerce from 2013 to 2016. Chanthol holds dual Cambodian and U.S. citizenships.

Chanthol served as chief negotiator during Cambodia's trade negotiations with the United States on the Liberation Day tariffs, resulting in a tariff reduction to 19% from the initial 49%.

== Early life and education ==
He received his B.S. in business administration from the American University, an Advanced Management Program (AMP) from the Wharton School of the University of Pennsylvania and a Master of Public Administration (MPA) from Harvard University.

== Career ==
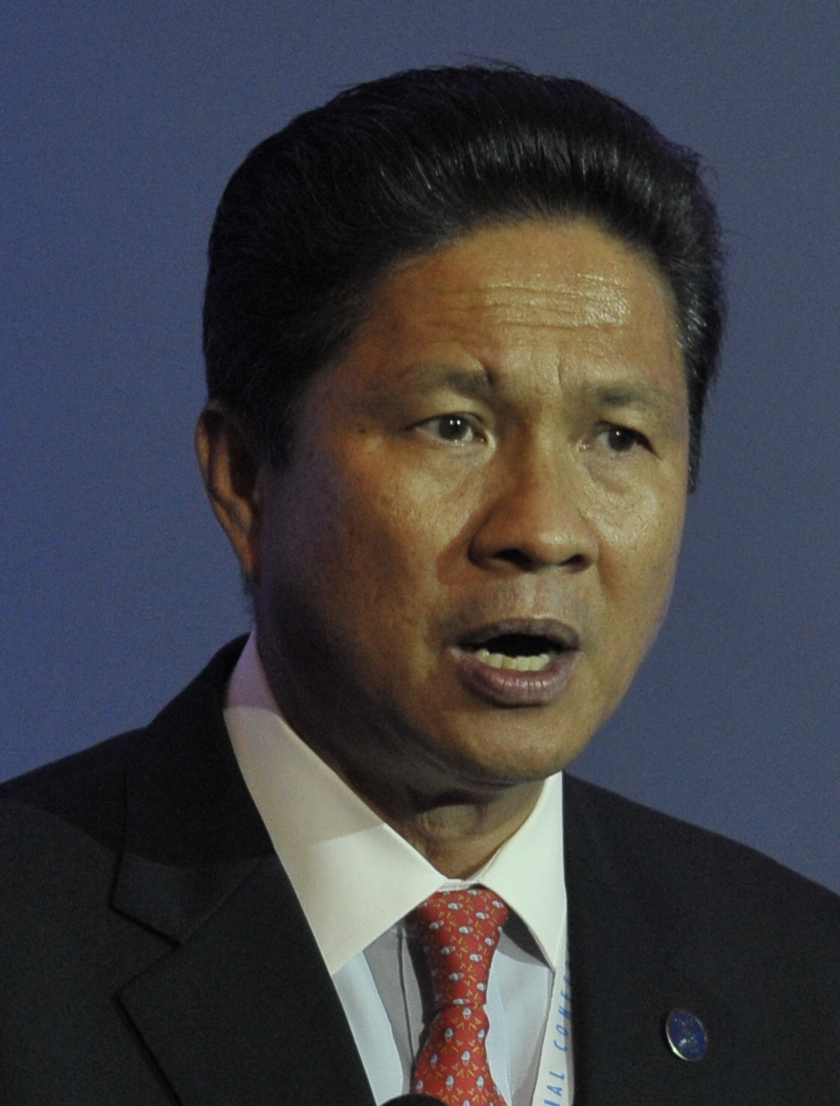
Chanthol at the World Trade Organization Ministerial Conference of 2013

Chanthol worked for General Electric for 16 years and held various senior executive positions in General Management and Finance functions both in the United States and in Asia.

He served as Secretary of State for Economy and Finance and a Secretary General of the Council for the Development of Cambodia (CDC) from 1994 to 1997. He was President of SC Investment Co., Ltd and served as the Economic and Finance Advisor to the President of the National Assembly from 1999 to 2003.

He was elected to represent Kandal Province in the National Assembly of Cambodia in 2003. Sun Chanthol was the Minister of Public Works and Transport from 2004 to 2008, and again from 2016.

== Personal life ==
He is married to Sun Sotha, heir to the Khau Chuly Group fortune.
