= Sok Chenda Sophea =

Cambodian politician

- សុខ ចិន្តាសោភា
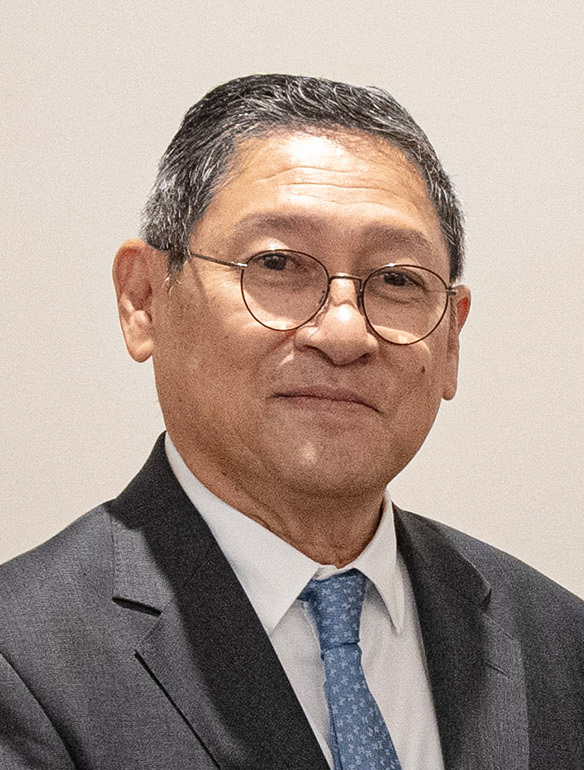
- Sok in 2024

Deputy Prime Minister of Cambodia
- Incumbent
- Assumed office 22 August 2023
- Prime Minister: Hun Manet
- Serving with: Vongsey Vissoth; Koeut Rith; Tea Seiha; Sar Sokha; Say Sam Al; Hang Chuon Naron; Sun Chanthol; Neth Savoeun; Aun Pornmoniroth

Minister of Foreign Affairs and International Cooperation
- In office 22 August 2023 – 20 November 2024
- Prime Minister: Hun Manet
- Preceded by: Prak Sokhonn
- Succeeded by: Prak Sokhonn

Secretary-General of the Council for the Development of Cambodia
- In office September 1997 – 22 August 2023
- Prime Minister: Hun Sen; Ung Huot
- Preceded by: Sun Chanthol
- Succeeded by: Kong Vimean

Personal details
- Born: 27 April 1956 (age 70) Phnom Penh, Cambodia
- Party: Cambodian People's Party
- Spouse: Toan Ek Sophie
- Education: University of Provence

Sok Chenda Sophea (Khmer: សុខ ចិន្តាសោភា; born 27 April 1956) is a Cambodian economist and politician currently serving as a Deputy Prime Minister. He briefly served as foreign minister from 2023 to 2024. He was previously Minister attached to the Prime Minister who also served as the Secretary General of the Council for the Development of Cambodia (CDC).

== Professional career ==
Prior to being appointed as Deputy Prime Minister and Minister of Foreign Affairs and International Cooperation (MFAIC), on August 22, 2023, Sok Chenda Sophea held the position of Minister Attached to the Prime Minister (OCM), concurrently serving as the Secretary General of the CDC. During this extensive period, he played a pivotal role in guiding the country's development policies and coordinating efforts aimed at enhancing Cambodia's socio-economic landscape.

From 1997 to 2008, Sok Chenda Sophea took the role as the Secretary General of the Council for the Development of Cambodia (CDC).

Earlier in his career, from 1993 to 1997, Sok Chenda Sophea served as the Under Secretary of State at the Ministry of Tourism (MOT).

In September 1997 he assumed the role of Secretary General of the Council for the Development of Cambodia (CDC), a vital agency under the Royal Government of Cambodia. This agency is entrusted with the pivotal tasks of rehabilitation, development, and the oversight of investment activities. At the helm of the CDC stands Samdech Techo Hun Sen, the Prime Minister of the Kingdom of Cambodia, serving as its Chairman.

Within the CDC's framework, Sok Chenda Sophea oversees three executive boards. The Cambodian Rehabilitation and Development Board (CRDB) is under his purview, responsible for orchestrating public investments and harmonizing international assistance efforts. The Cambodian Investment Board (CIB) operates under his guidance, focusing on facilitating private investments. Additionally, Chenda Sophea Sok steers the Cambodian Special Economic Zones Board (CSEZB), a crucial entity dedicated to promoting and supporting Special Economic Zones.
