= Koeut Rith =

Cambodian politician

His Excellency Koeut Rith
- កើត រិទ្ធ

Deputy Prime Minister of Cambodia
- Incumbent
- Assumed office 22 August 2023
- Prime Minister: Hun Manet

Minister of Justice
- Incumbent
- Assumed office 30 March 2020
- Prime Minister: Hun Sen; Hun Manet
- Preceded by: Ang Vong Vathana

Secretary of State for Justice
- In office 2014 – 2 April 2020

Personal details
- Born: 2 January 1979 (age 47) Central Region, Democratic Kampuchea (now in Kampong Cham Province, Cambodia)
- Education: University of Lyon
- Occupation: Law professor, politician

Koeut Rith (Khmer: កើត រិទ្ធ; born 2 January 1979) is a Cambodian legal expert and the current Minister of Justice.

== Biography ==
=== Youth on the banks of the Mekong ===
Koeut Rith was born on January 2, 1979, in the last days of the Khmer Rouge regime in the village of Prey Toteung, Prey Chhor District, Kampong Cham Province, Cambodia (then-Central Region, Democratic Kampuchea).

=== Legal studies in Cambodia and France ===
In 1999, when Koeut Rith started his law studies in Phnom Penh, Koeut Rith obtained a scholarship allowing him to continue his higher education in France, in Lyon.

In 2000, Koeut Rith obtained a bachelor's degree in private law at the University Lumière Lyon 2, then the following year a master's degree (Master 1 at the time) with the distinction "Very good" from the same institution. In 2002, he specialized in criminal law and criminal sciences (Master 2) at Lyon 3 university.

He began his career as a teacher at the Royal University of Law and Economics where he continued to teach for the French Department of Law until 2016.

=== Legal carrier at the Ministry of Justice ===
In 2007, he joined the Cambodian Ministry of Justice, first as Undersecretary of State and then promoted to Secretary of State in 2013. Closely involved in the work of compiling the Cambodian Criminal and Criminal Procedure Codes in collaboration with French legal advisors, he contributed to the harmonization of law in criminal matters throughout the country.

In April 2020, King Norodom Sihamoni issued a royal decree appointing Koeut Rith as Minister of Justice, replacing Ang Vong Vathana, who had held the position for 16 years.

In September 2020, Rith criticized union leader Rong Chhun for defamation and misrepresentation of the border issue with the intention of inciting social unrest is illegal and destroys the peace and stability of the country.

In January 2021, Rith directed the formation of two committees to begin the process of establishing separate courts for commercial and labour disputes, with the support of human rights advocacy groups.

He has publicly expressed his support for Hun Manet as the most fit successor of Hun Sen at the head of the executive government of Cambodia.

== Contribution ==
=== Expert of the law in Cambodia ===
Koeut Rith is one of the finest experts in Cambodian law of his generation with an "exemplary academic career".

=== Fighting for due process within the Cambodian judiciary ===
Koeut Rith has strived to apply the recommendations the United Nations High Commissioner for Human Rights for the reform of the legal system and the judiciary so that courts are independent, trustworthy and guarantee equality.

Court officials at all levels must ... ensure the fair provision of justice for the people. Legal services must be conducted quickly, accurately and fairly to further enhance the honour and dignity of the judiciary.

— Koeut Rith

While Koeut Rith has emphasized the necessity of due process and the fight against corruption in Cambodian courts, more than a third of the nation's prison population is in pre-trial detention, though some rights groups put that figure closer to 75 percent. Koeut Rith has therefore hastened court procedures to reduce prison overcrowding.

== Works ==
- "Introduction to Cambodian law" (2003 and 2005)
- "Explanation of the project of the development of the Penal Code and its contribution to the study of Cambodian criminal law" (2005)
- "Introduction to Cambodian law" (2016), volume published by the Konrad Adenauer Foundation also entitled
