= Jijim =

Jijim may mean:

- Buchimgae, pan-fried Korean food made by cooking something on a greased frying pan
- Jijim, a type of Turkish rug made of strips of Kilim sewn together
