= Luu Meng =

Chinese Cambodian chef and author

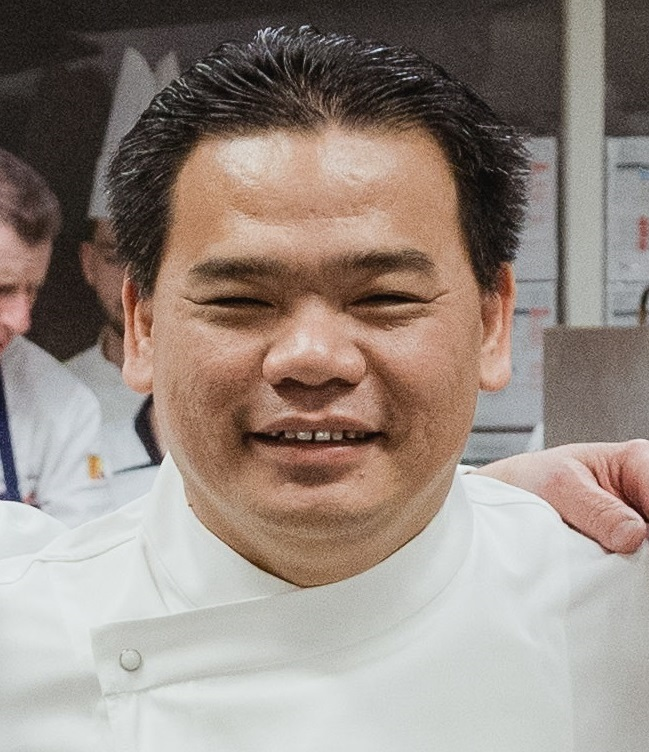
- Meng in 2016
- Born: 7 February 1974 (age 52); Phnom Penh, Khmer Republic
- Education: Chinese Tong Hoa School
- Culinary career
- Cooking style: Cambodian cuisine
- Current restaurants
- Malis, Topaz, Khéma, Yi Sang, Sevensea, Kanji, Uy Kuyteav
- Awardss
- Order of Agricultural Merit (2012); Asia’s Top Chef (2014)
- Website: luumeng.com

Luu Meng (Khmer: លូ ម៉េង; born on 7 February 1974) is a Chinese-Cambodian chef, culinary author and hospitality entrepreneur. He is the CEO of Almond Group, director of Thalias Group, president of the Cambodia Tourism Federation, president of Cambodian Hotel Association, president of Cambodia Chef Federation, vice president of ASEAN Hotel Association and Cuisine Advisor of the Confrérie de la Chaîne des Rôtisseurs.

== Biography ==
Luu Meng was born in 1974 in Phnom Penh, Cambodia. At the age of three his family was forced to relocate to a U.N. operated refugee camp in Thailand where Meng grew up as the oldest of three. His family survived the Khmer Rouge period by following Meng's grandfather's advice to stay near the water. His grandfather had previously fled Mao Zedong's regime in China and settled in Phnom Penh with his family, where he had sold clocks and watches at the Central Market. Meng's mother Diep Cheang had run a famous banh chao shop on Sothearos Boulevard and his grandmother worked as a cook in the Royal Palace kitchens and operated a restaurant before the Khmer Rouge.

In the early 1980s, when Meng was eight years old, his family returned to Phnom Penh and purchased a house near Orussey Market. Meng attended the Chinese Tong Hoa School. In 1993 he started working at the Sofitel Cambodiana as a trainee cook, becoming a sous chef in 1995. At Cambodiana Meng met his future business partner Arnaud Darc who worked there as a cost controller. Later Meng worked as an executive chef for the Sunway Hotel. In 2001, he worked for Sofitel in Siem Reap for a year and then returned to Siem Reap, where Meng worked with Darc's restaurant "Topaz". In 2004, together with Darc he opened "Malis", the first Cambodian fine dining restaurant in Phnom Penh. To design the restaurant's menu Meng travelled throughout Cambodia for six months and collected traditional recipes, which he presented using farm-sourced ingredients and modern cooking techniques.

On 8 August 2008, after two years of construction Meng opened the flagship Almond Hotel. The following year he opened the Yi Sang Chinese Restaurant at the Phnom Penh Special Economic Zone and in 2011 another Yi Sang Restaurant at Château on Phnom Penh's riverside. 2012 saw the publishing of the book "Cambodia’s Top Tables" co-written by Luu Meng and Siem Reap-based British food writer and journalist Clive Graham-Ranger featuring recipes from 52 restaurants in Cambodia. The same year Luu Meng was awarded the Order of Agricultural Merit by the French government for "his creation of Cambodian nouvelle cuisine and building a bridge to other culinary cultures".

In 2014, Meng received Asia's Top Chef award from the Malaysia-based business and lifestyle magazines "Top 10 of Malaysia" and "Top 10 of Asia". In 2016, he published the cookbook "Cambodia Sevensea's", which Meng wrote together with culinary writer Darren Gall, with Cambodian coastal recipes from Kampot, Kep, Sihanoukville and the islands.

In May 2021, Meng and other private donors partnered with Princess Norodom Arunrasmy's Muditha Foundation to provide food hampers to people in areas most affected by the COVID-19 pandemic in Cambodia.

== Books ==
- Darren Gall, Luu Meng (2016). Cambodia Sevensea's. Sorse Hospitality ISBN 978-9-924-90840-1

Written with culinary writer Darren Gall, the cookbook focuses on coastal Cambodian cuisine, offering recipes from regions like Kampot, Kep, Sihanoukville, and the islands. It emphasizes the use of fresh, local seafood and traditional cooking techniques.

- Clive Graham-Ranger, Luu Meng (2012). Cambodia's Top Tables. AsiaLife Media ISBN 978-9-996-37360-2

Co-authored with British food writer Clive Graham-Ranger, this book features recipes from 52 restaurants across Cambodia. It highlights the diversity and richness of Cambodian culinary traditions.
