= Prasidh =

Prasidh is a given name and surname. Notable people with the name include:

- Cham Prasidh (born 1951), Cambodian government official
- Prasidh Krishna (born 1996), Indian cricketer
