= Malis (restaurant) =

Restaurants in Siem Reap and Phnom Penh, Cambodia

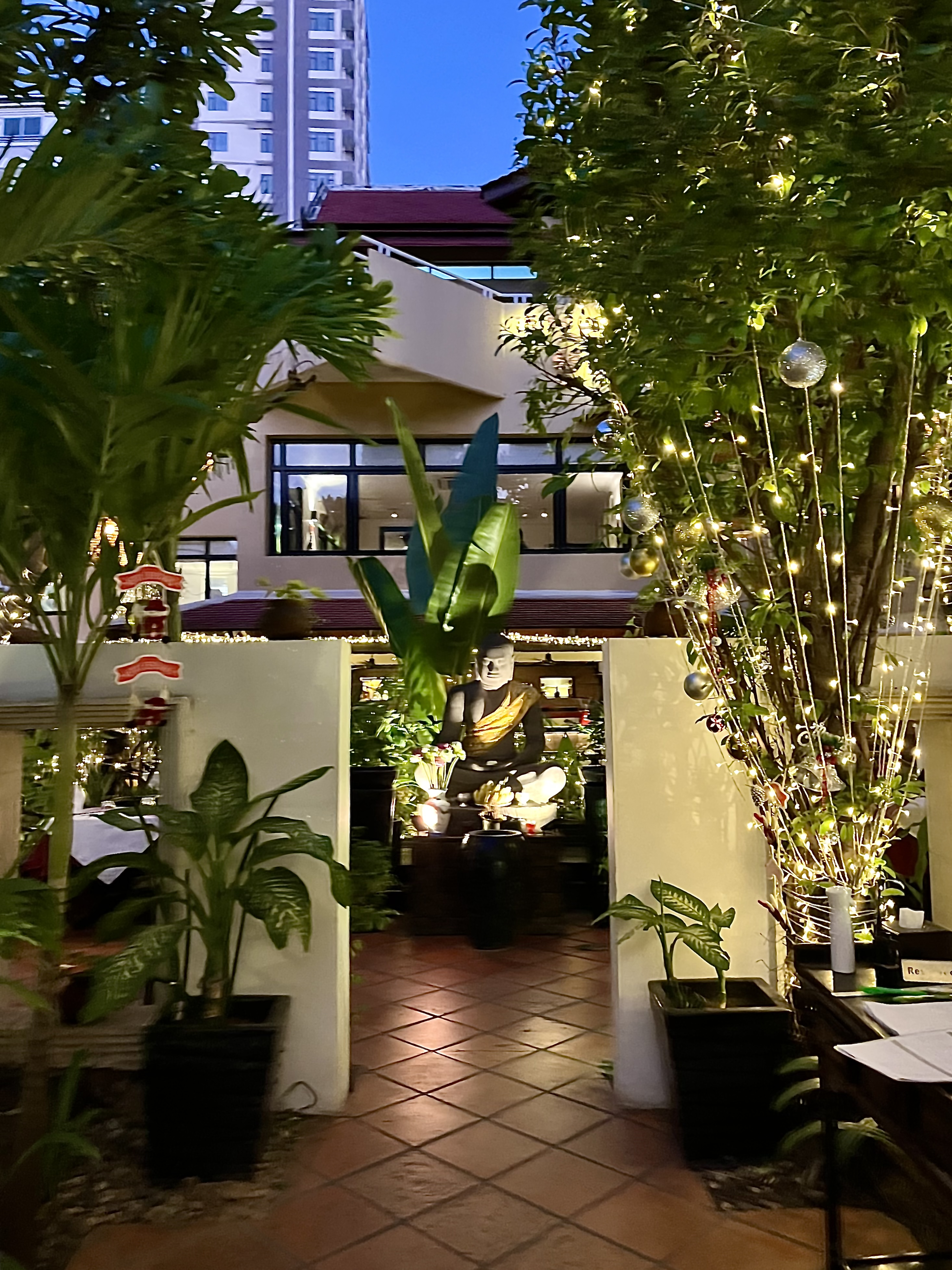
- Interactive map of Malis

Restaurant information
- Established: 2004 (22 years ago)
- Owner: Thalias Hospitality Group
- Head chef: Luu Meng
- Food type: Cambodian cuisine
- Dress code: None
- Location: 136 Norodom Boulevard, Phnom Penh, 12301, Cambodia
- Coordinates: 11.553178°N 104.9290418°E
- Seating capacity: 300 (in Siem Reap)
- Other locations: Pokambor Avenue, Siem Reap, Cambodia
- Website: malis-restaurant.com

Malis (from Khmer: ម្លិះ mlih – "jasmine") is a Cambodian restaurant opened in 2004 in Phnom Penh, the first Cambodian fine dining restaurant in the city. To design the restaurant's menu chef Luu Meng travelled throughout Cambodia for six months and collected traditional recipes, which he presented using farm-sourced ingredients and modern cooking techniques. In 2011, Malis won the Tourism Alliance Award as the Restaurant of the Year at the International Travel Expo in Ho Chi Minh City.

In 2016, another Malis restaurant was opened in Pokambor Avenue in Siem Reap. The opening was attended by the Secretary of State Kong Vibol, Minister of Industry and Handicrafts Cham Prasidh and Director General of APSARA Sum Map. In 2019, the restaurants unveiled their revamped menu. Malis is often regarded as one of the best Cambodian restaurants in both Phnom Penh and Siem Reap.
