= Malis =

Malis is a surname. Notable people with the surname include:

- Alexandros Malis (born 1997), Greek footballer
- Claire Malis (1943–2012), American actress
- Cy Malis (1907–1971), American baseball player
- David Malis (1957), American operatic baritone

== See also ==
- Malis (region), an area of Greece occupied by the Malians
- Malis (restaurant), a Cambodian restaurant
- Somali people, an ethnic group native to Somalia
