= Oyster omelette =

Southeast Asian dish

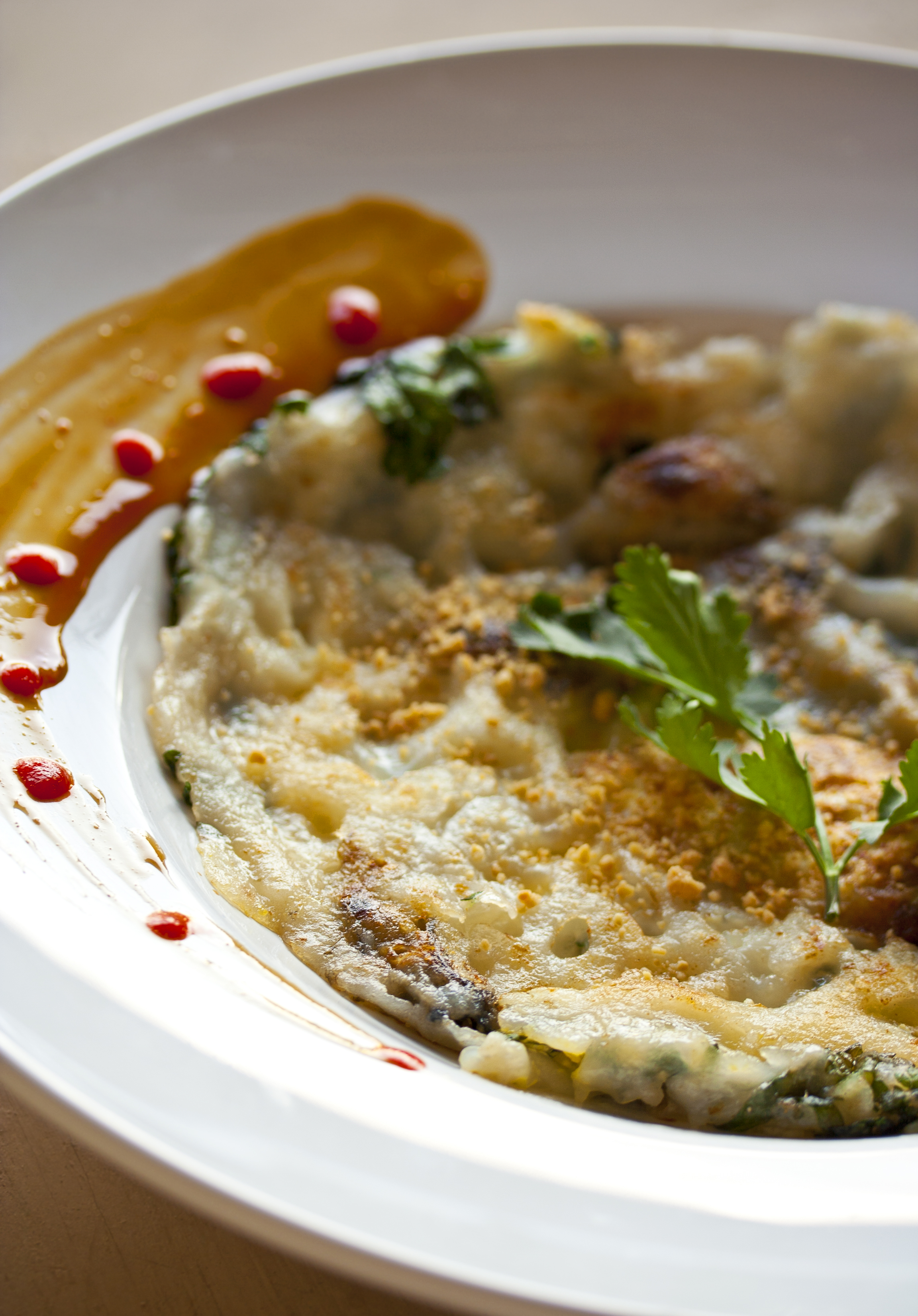
- Alternative names: O-a-tsian
- Course: Breakfast, lunch, and dinner
- Place of origin: Minnan region and Chaoshan, China
- Created by: Min Nan people (Hokkien and Teochew people)

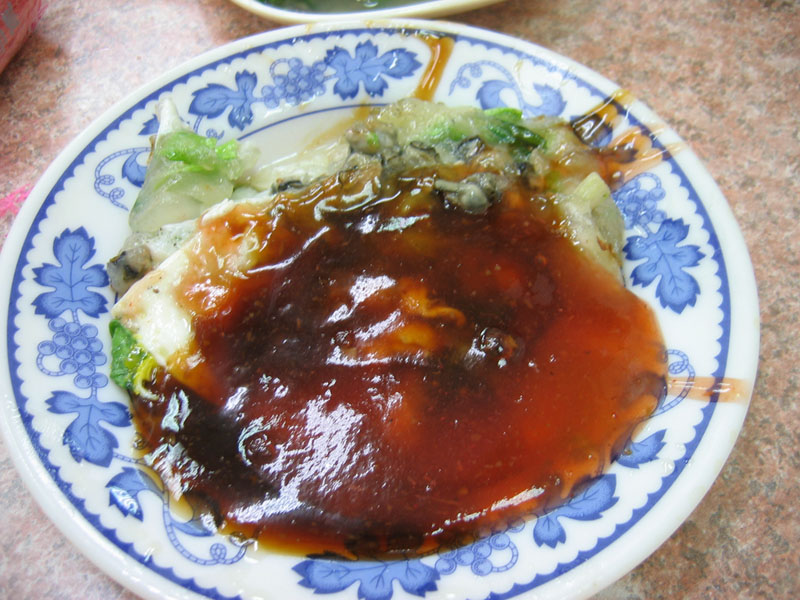
Taiwanese-style oyster omelette

The oyster omelette or oyster cake (Note: as usually known in the Philippines), also known as o-a-tsian (Hokkien Chinese: 蚵仔煎; Pe̍h-ōe-jī: ô-á-chian; Tâi-lô: ô-á-tsian), o-chien (Hokkien: 蚵煎; ô-chian) or orh luak (Teochew traditional Chinese: 蠔烙; simplified Chinese: 蚝烙; Peng'im: o^{5} luah^{4}), is a dish of Southern Min (Hokkien and Teochew) origin that is renowned for its savory flavor in its native Minnan region and Chaoshan, along with Taiwan and many parts of Southeast Asia, such as Indonesia, Philippines, Thailand, Malaysia or Singapore, due to the influence of the Hokkien and Teochew diaspora.

== Ingredients ==
The dish consists of a starchy egg batter with a filling primarily composed of small Pacific oysters. The starch (typically sweet potato starch) provides the dish with a chewy texture. Pork lard is often used to fry the resulting omelet. Depending on regional variations, a savory sauce may then be poured on top of the omelette for added taste.

Spicy or chili sauce mixed with lime juice is often added to provide an intense kick. Shrimp can sometimes be substituted in place of oysters; in this case, it is called shrimp omelette (蝦仁煎).

== Names ==
In different Chinese languages, the "oyster omelette" is known by various names in different Chinese geographical regions.

| Chinese name | Pronunciations in different spoken variations | Geographical areas that use such a name |
|---|---|---|
| 蠔烙 | In Teochew: o^{5} luah^{4} In Mandarin: háo lào/luò | In Chaoshan region and overseas communities connected to the region. |
| 蚵仔煎 | In Hokkien and Taiwanese Hokkien: ô-á-chian In Mandarin: kézǎi jiān | Southern Fujian, Taiwan, and Philippines |
| 蚵煎 | In Hokkien: ô-chian In Mandarin: hé jiān | Southern Fujian, Malaysia, Singapore, and Philippines |
| 牡蠣煎 | In Hokkien: bó͘-lē-chian In Mandarin: mǔlì jiān | Most areas of mainland China |
| 海蠣煎 | In Hokkien: hái-lē-chian In Mandarin: hǎilì jiān | Southern Fujian |
| 蠔煎 | In Cantonese: hòuh jīn In Mandarin: háo jiān | Chaoshan, Singapore, Malaysia and Indonesia |
| 煎蠔餅 | In Cantonese: jīn hòuh béng In Hakka: Tsiên-hàu-piáng (Pha̍k-fa-sṳ); In Mandarin: jiān háo bǐng | Hong Kong, Macau and neighboring Liangguang |
| 蠔仔餠 | In Cantonese: hòuh jái béng In Hakka: hàu-tsái-piáng (Pha̍k-fa-sṳ); In Mandarin: háo zǐ bǐng | Hong Kong, Macau and the Pearl River Delta |
| 蠔仔煎 | In Cantonese: hòuh jái jīn In Hakka: hàu-tsái-tsiên In Mandarin: háo zǐ jiān | Hong Kong, Macau and the Pearl River Delta |

== Styles ==
Oyster omelettes can be broadly classified into two categories, namely, Hokkien-style omelettes and Teochew-style omelettes. The former is popular in Minnan and Taiwan, while latter is the usual style seen in Hong Kong and Chaoshan areas. The two styles of oyster omelettes are also different in terms of key ingredients used. The former uses chicken eggs and a mixture of sweet potato flour, tapioca flour and/or cornstarch as the batter; the latter uses duck eggs and sweet potato flour The cooking processes are slightly different too, as the Hokkien ones are deep-fried, while Teochew-style ones are usually pan-fried.

== Thailand ==
In Thailand known as hoi thot (Thai: หอยทอด; lit: "fried shellfish"), it was adapted to mussel omelettes (hoi malaeng phu thot, Thai: หอยแมลงภู่ทอด), though the original oyster version (hoi nang rom thot, Thai: หอยนางรมทอด) also popular but more expensive. In Bangkok, notable areas for oyster omelettes include Talat Wang Lang near Siriraj Hospital and Wang Lang (Siriraj) Pier in Bangkok Noi where there are two restaurants, Yaowarat neighborhood, where there is one Michelin-Bib Gourmand restaurant with Charoen Krung neighborhood in Bang Rak, among others. In 2017, the World Street Food Congress announced that oyster omelette is one of the three most notable street foods among the street foods of Thailand.

== Gallery ==
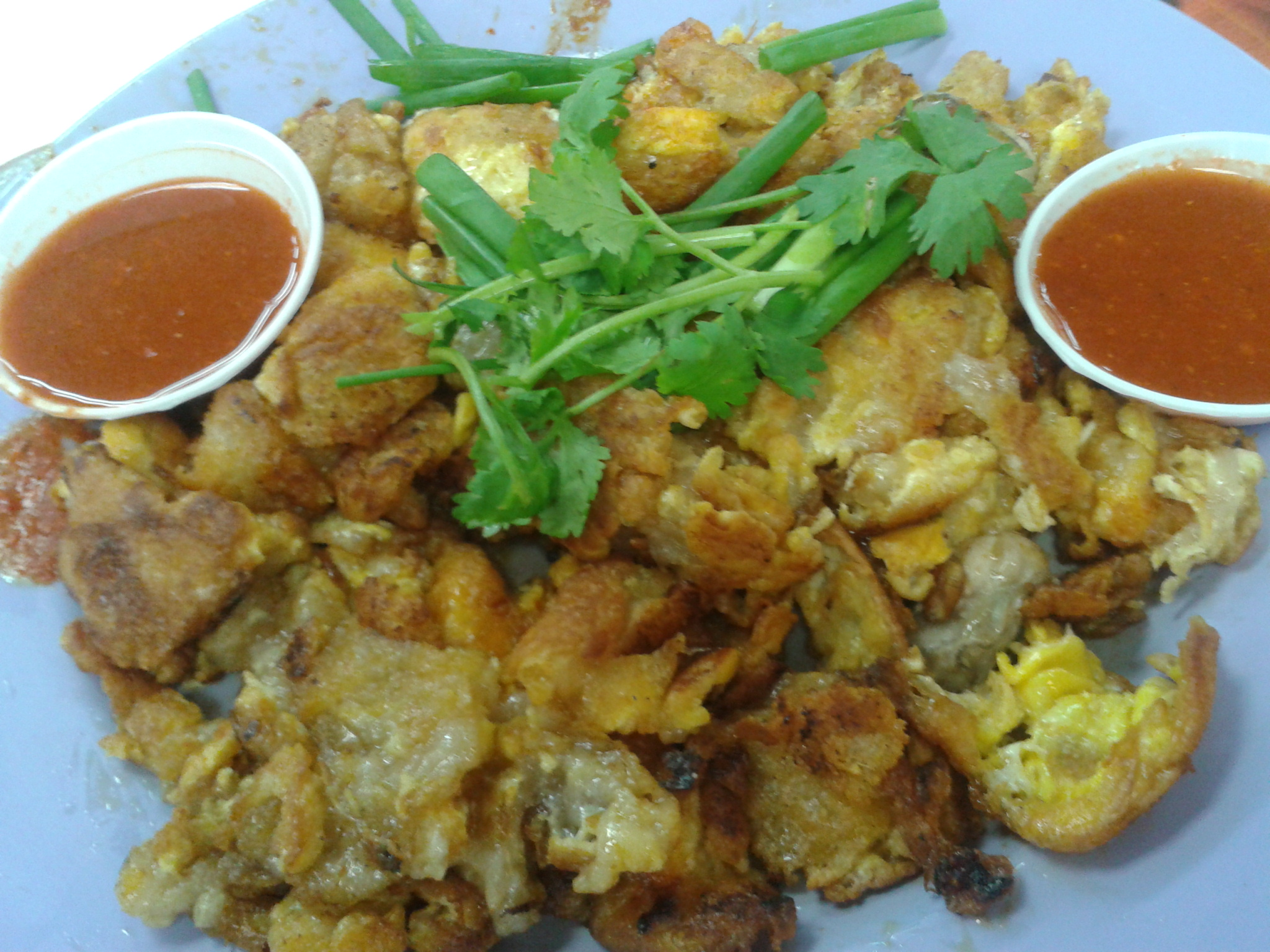

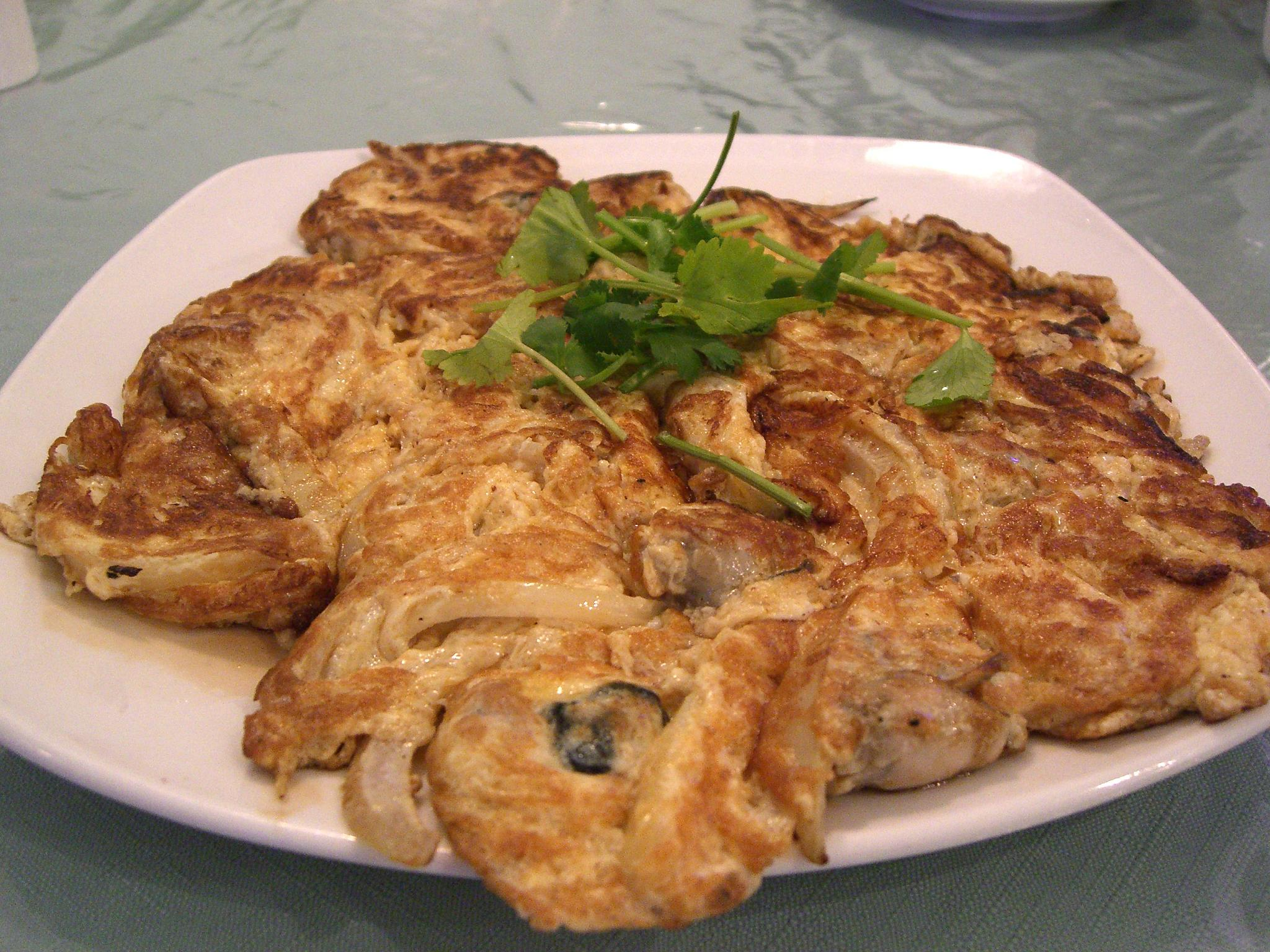

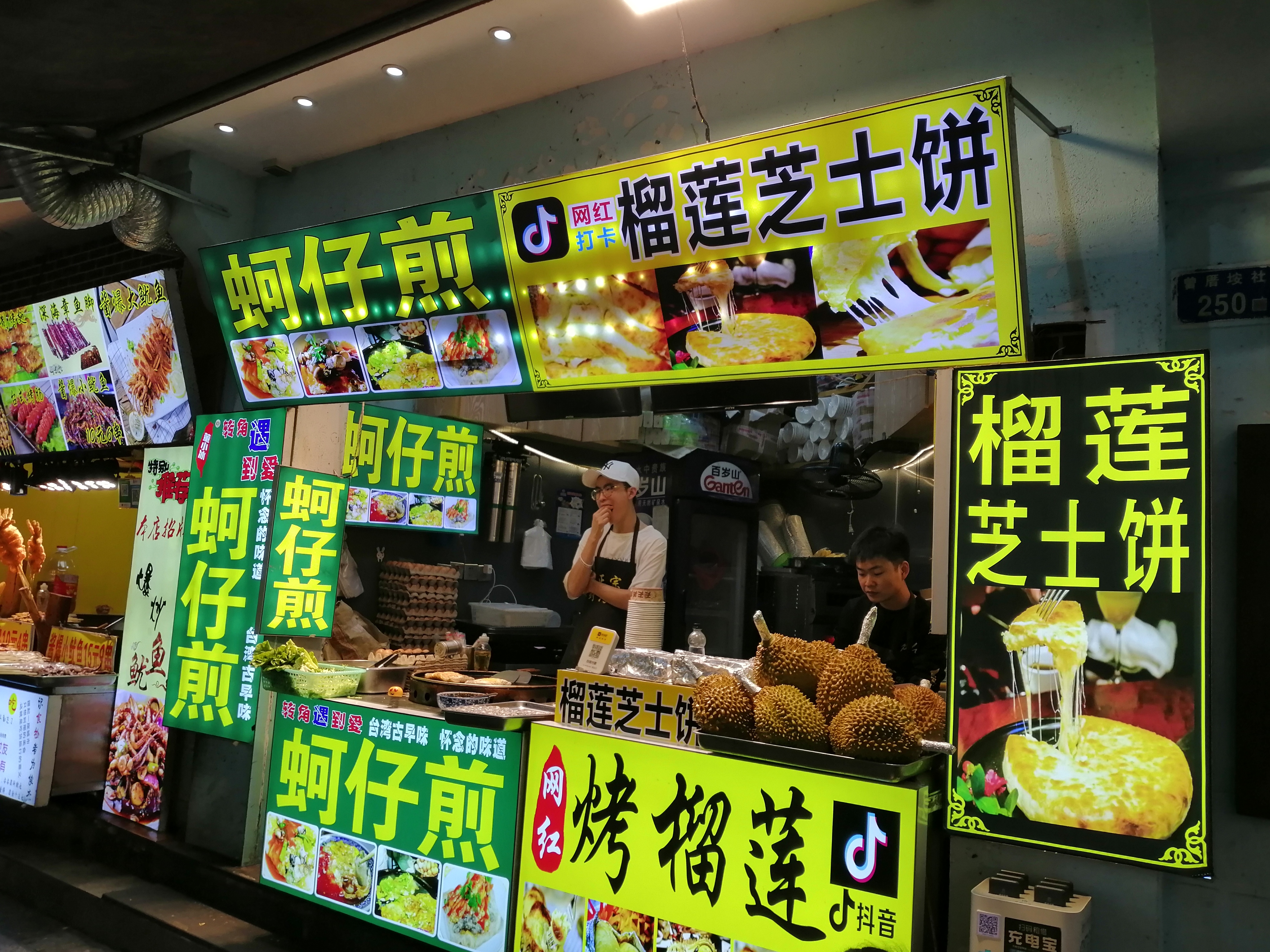

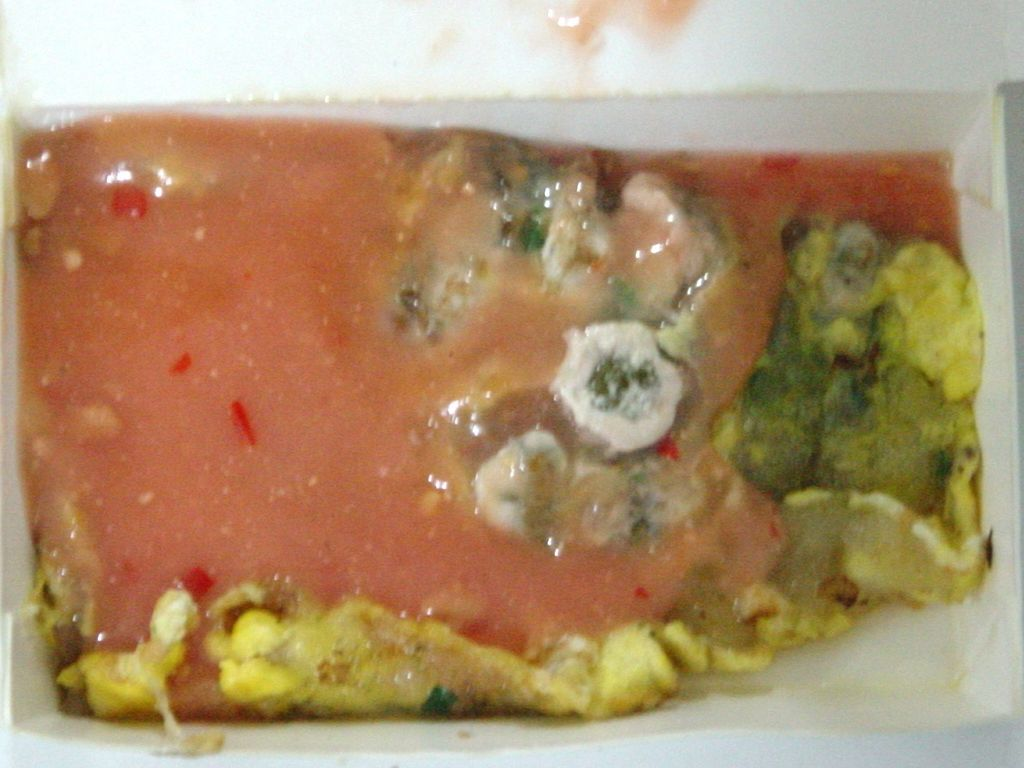

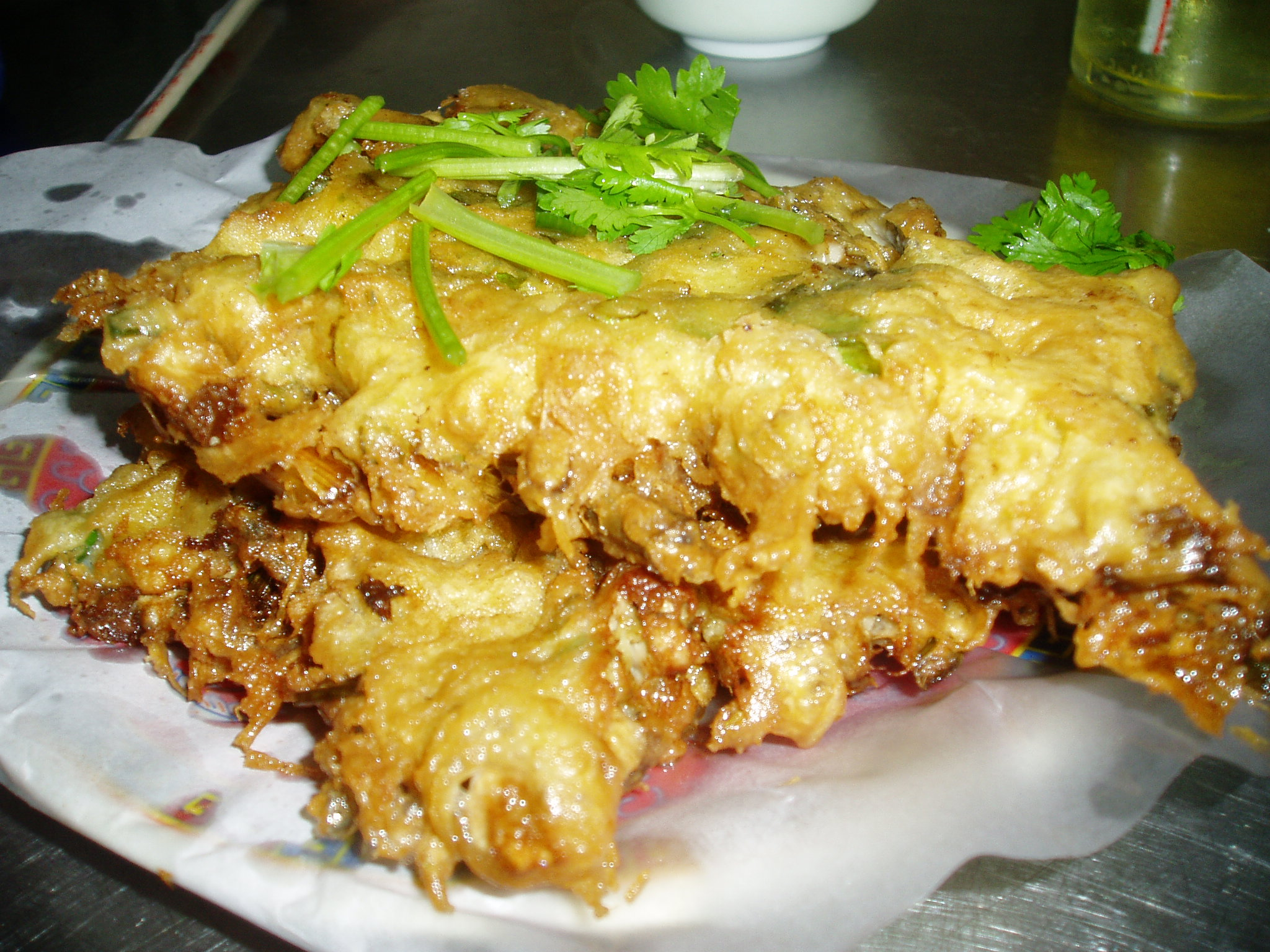

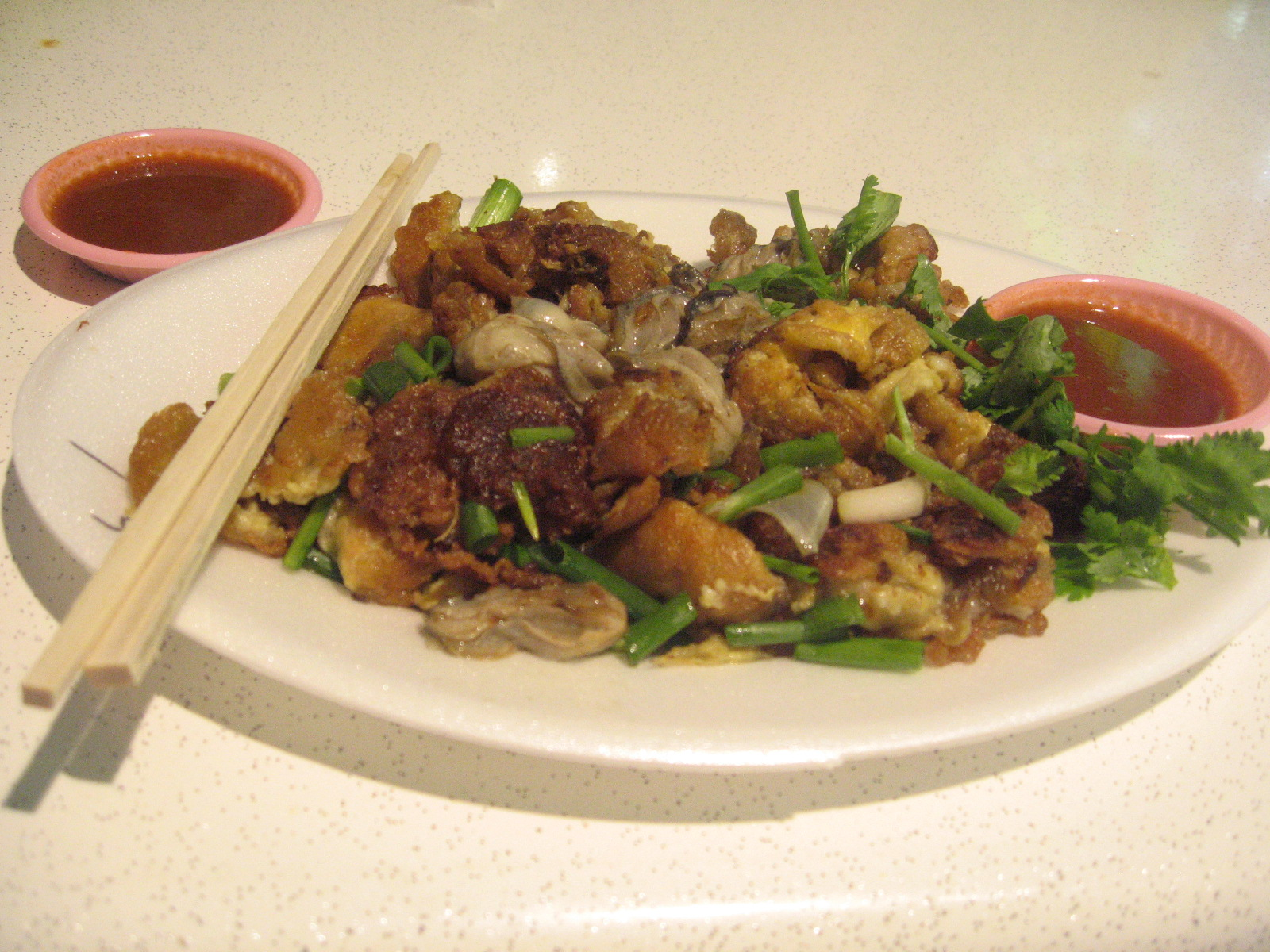

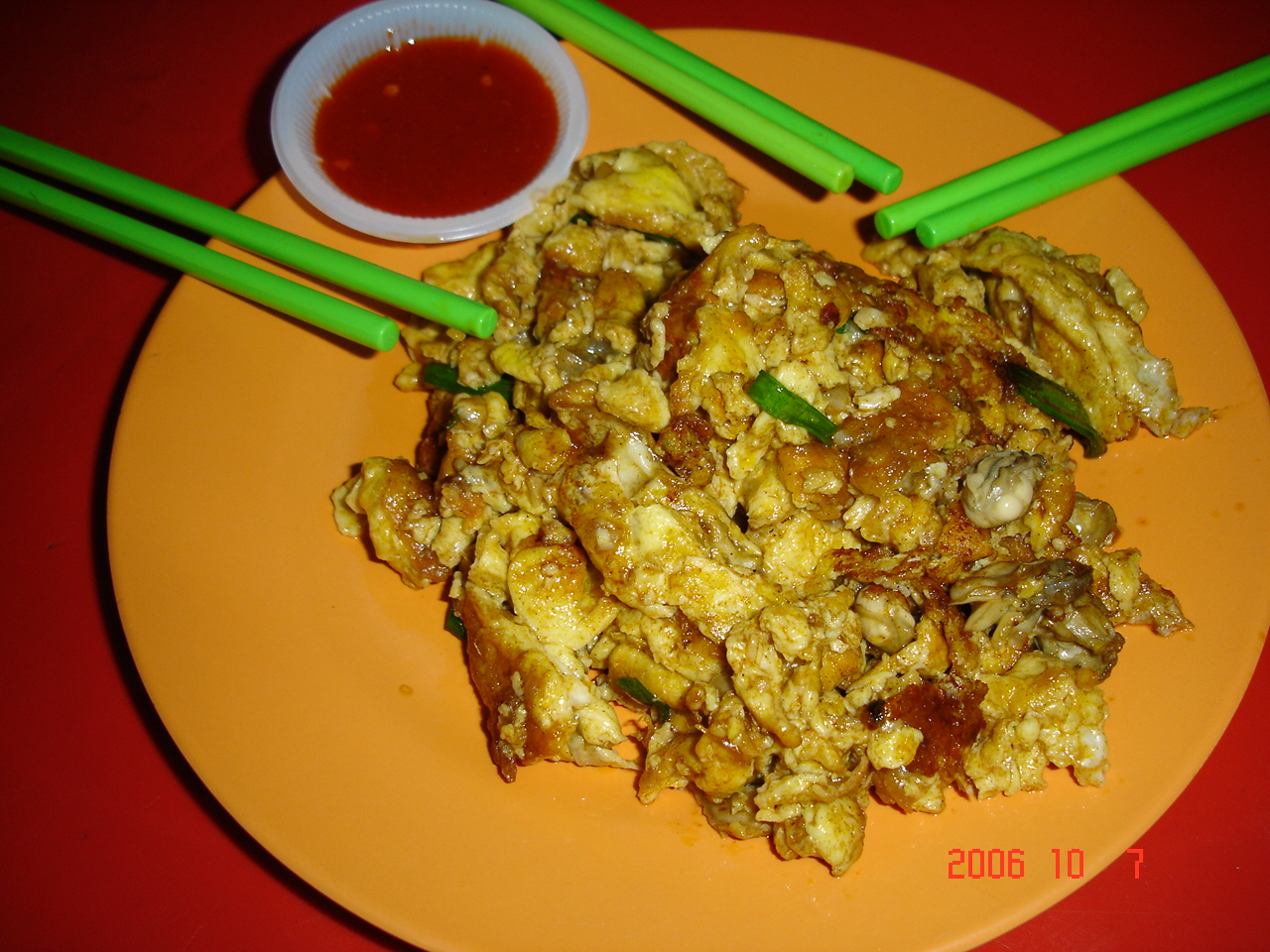

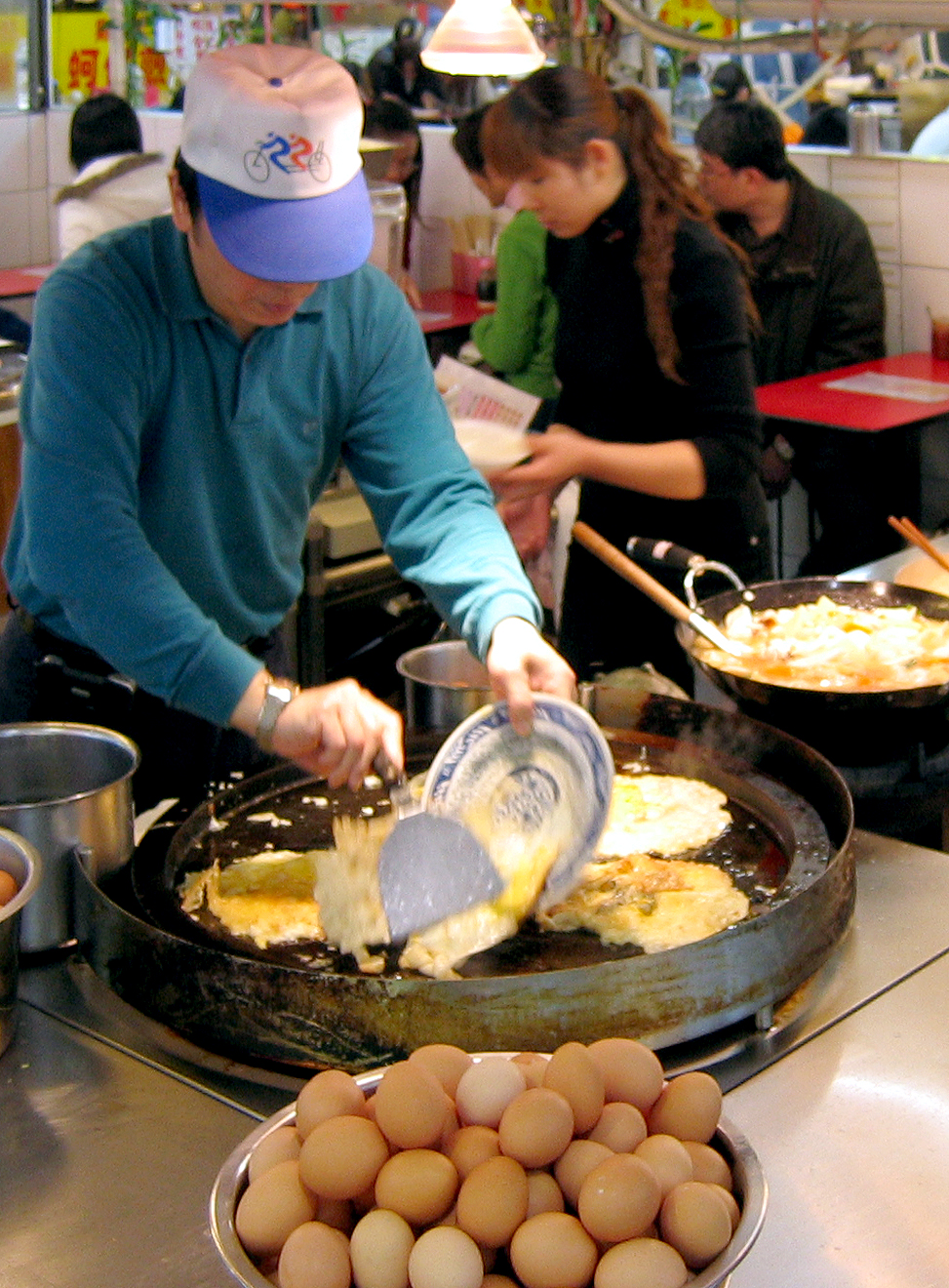

== See also ==
- Night markets in Taiwan
- Hangtown fry
- Haemul pajeon
- List of Chinese dishes
- List of egg dishes
- List of seafood dishes
