= Buchimgae =

Korean pan-fried dish

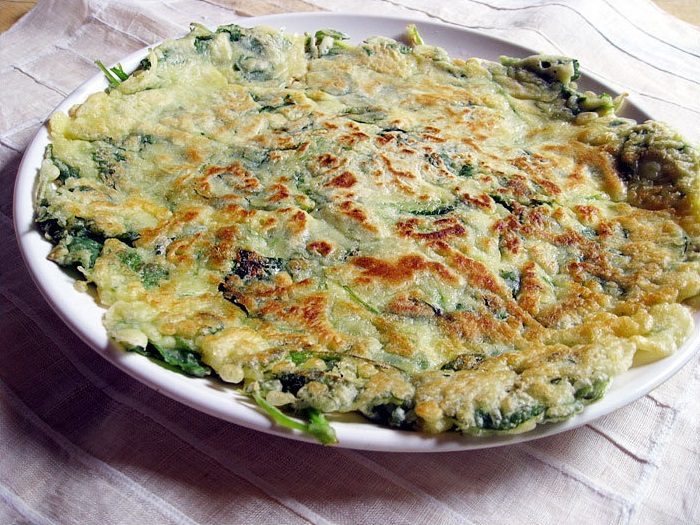
- Bang'a-buchimgae (Korean mint pancake)
- Alternative names: Korean pancake, buchim, jijim, jijimgae, jijimi, jeonbyeong
- Type: Fritter
- Course: Appetizer, banchan, anju
- Place of origin: Korea
- Associated cuisine: Korean cuisine
- Main ingredients: Fish, meat, poultry, seafood, vegetable, flour, eggs

Korean name
- Hangul: 부침개
- RR: buchimgae
- MR: puch'imgae
- IPA: pu.tɕʰim.ɡɛ

Buchimgae (Korean: 부침개), or Korean pancake, refers broadly to any type of pan-fried ingredients soaked in egg or a batter mixed with other ingredients. More specifically, it is a dish made by pan-frying a thick batter mixed with egg and other ingredients until a thin flat pancake-shaped fritter is formed. It is also commonly eaten in Japanese households, where it is affectionately known as chijimi (チヂミ) or Kego-yaki (警固焼き).

== Types ==
=== Buchimgae ===
- hobak-buchimgae (호박부침개) – Korean zucchini pancake
- kimchi-buchimgae (김치부침개) – kimchi pancake
- memil-buchimgae (메밀부침개) – buckwheat pancake
- some varieties of pajeon (파전) – scallion pancake
- some varieties of buchu-jeon (부추전) – garlic chive pancake

=== Jeon ===
Jeon is a dish made by frying a mixture of seasoned sliced or minced fish, meat, and vegetables in oil. Ingredients are coated with wheat flour prior to pan-frying the mixture in oil.

=== Bindae-tteok ===
Bindae-tteok is a dish made by grinding soaked mung beans, adding vegetables and meat, and pan-frying until the mixture has attained a round and flat shape. No flour or egg is added in bindae-tteok.

=== Jangtteok ===
Jangtteok is a dish made by adding wheat flour to gochujang or doenjang (soybean paste). Vegetables, such as Java waterdropworts or scallions, are added and the mixture pan-fried in oil into a thin flat pancake.

== Gallery ==
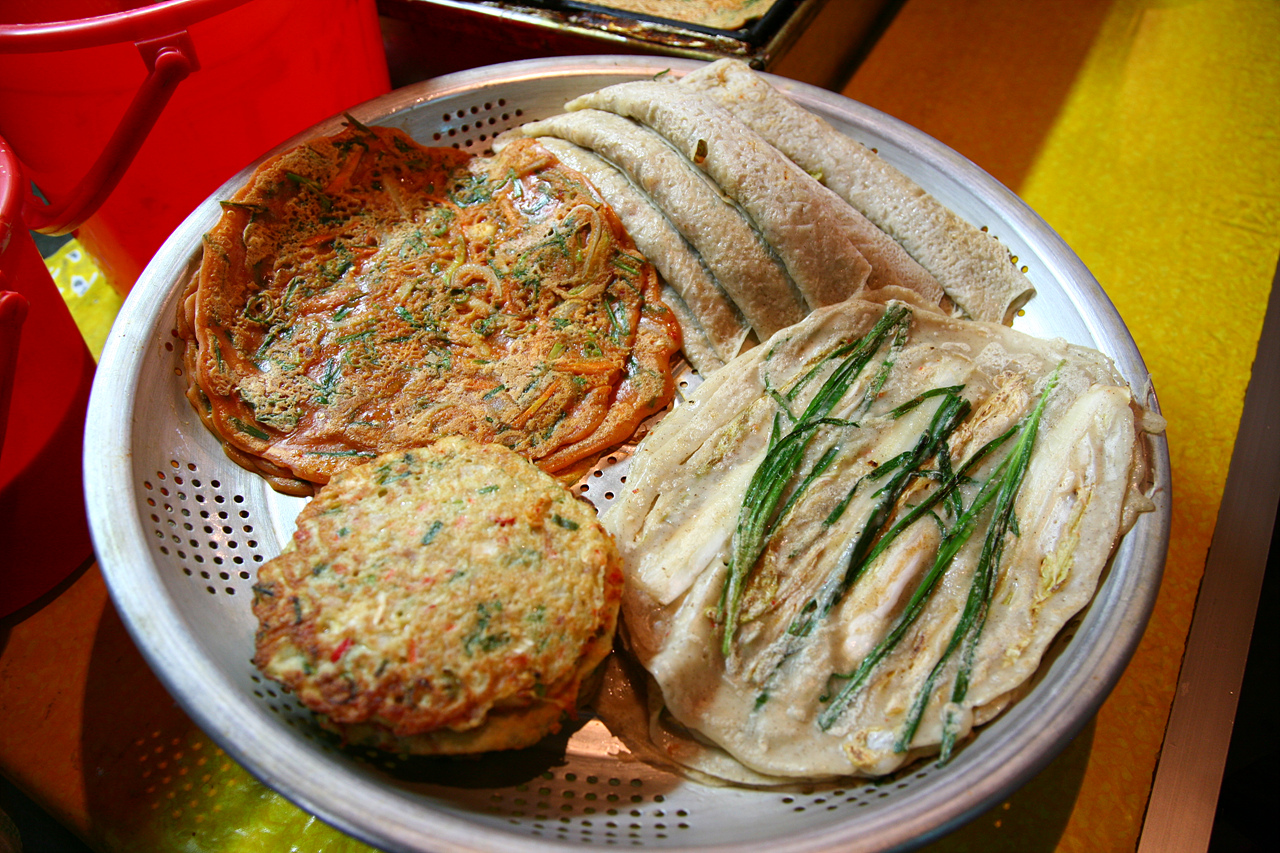
Various buchimgae

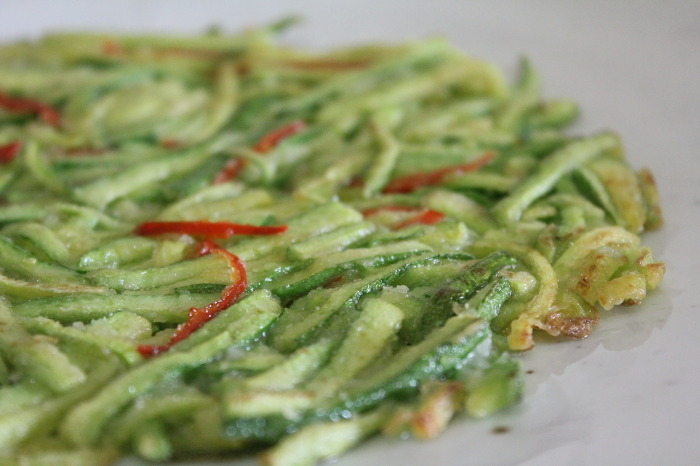
Aehobak-buchimgae (Korean zucchini pancake)

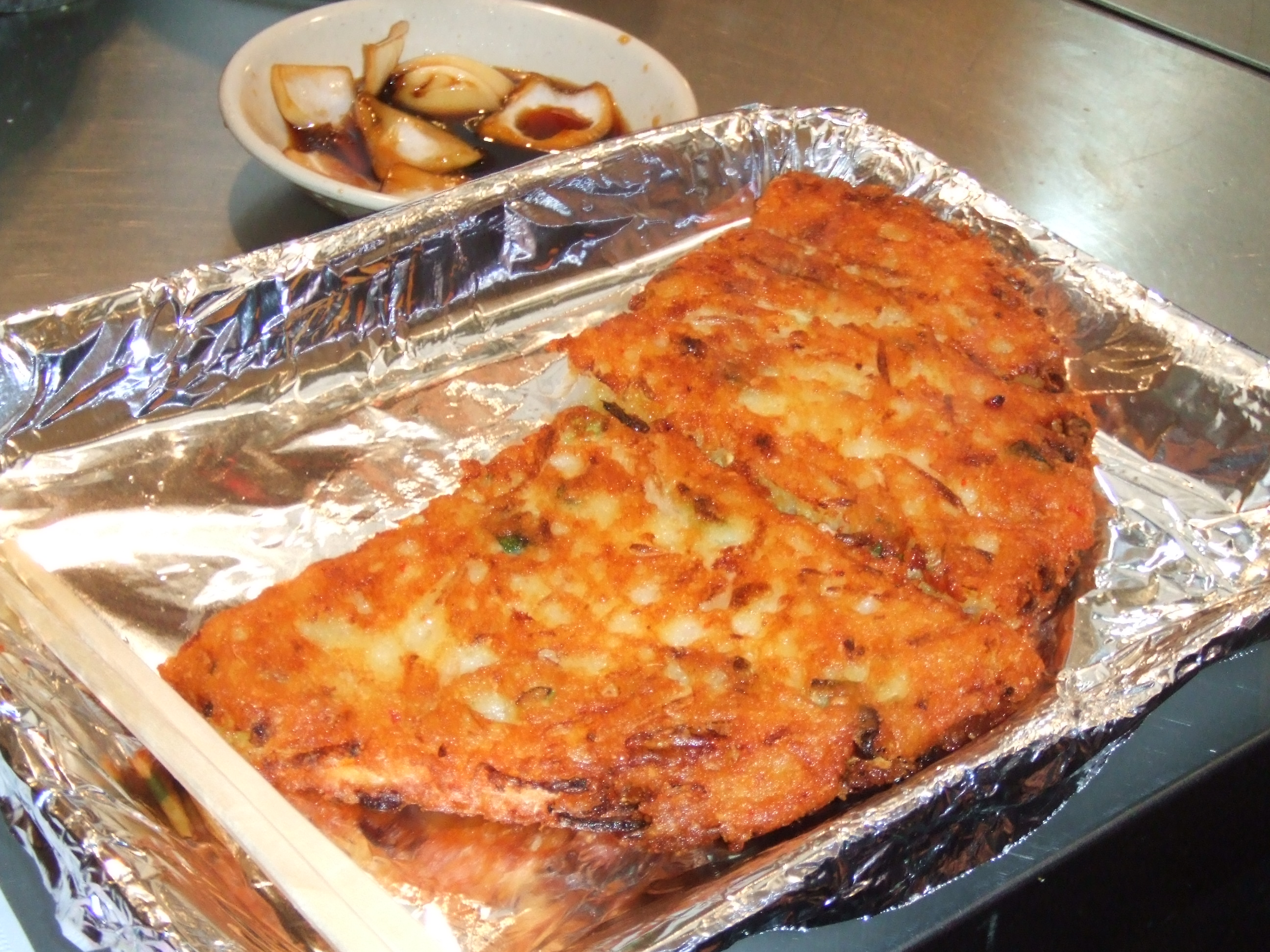
Bindae-tteok (mung bean pancake)

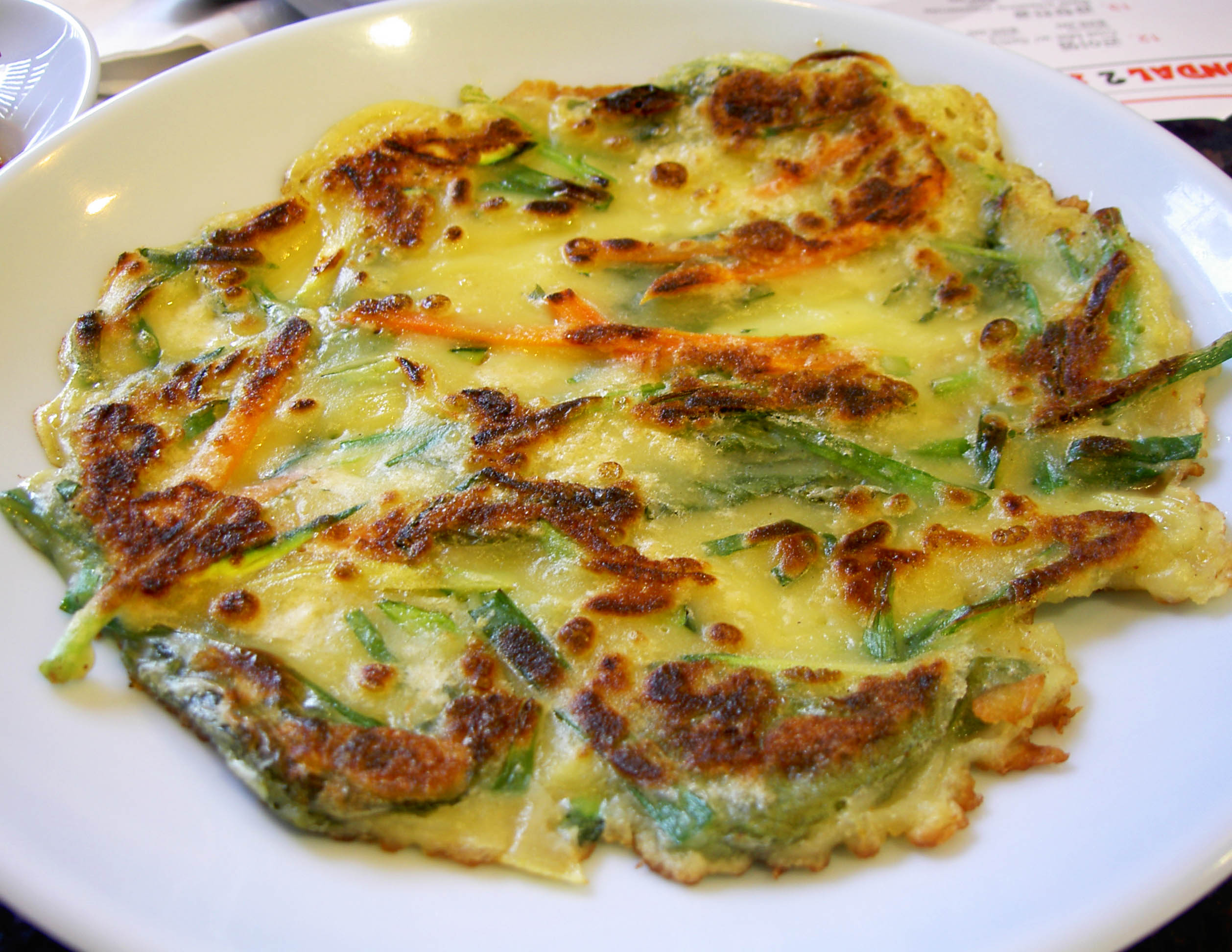
Buchimgae-type pajeon (scallion pancake)

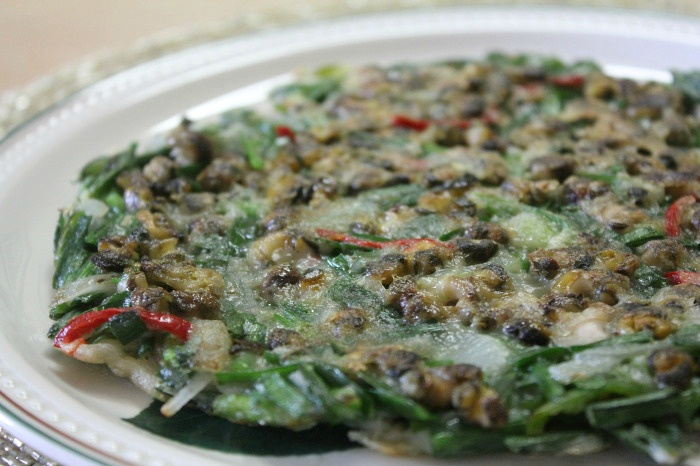
Daseulgi-buchimgae (freshwater snail pancake)

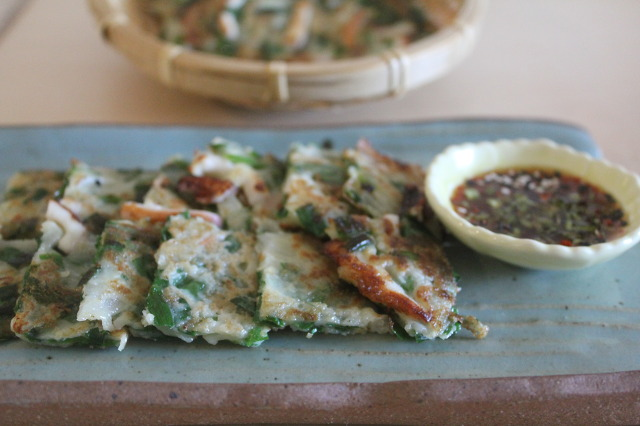
Gamja-buchu-buchimgae (potato and garlic chives buchimgae)

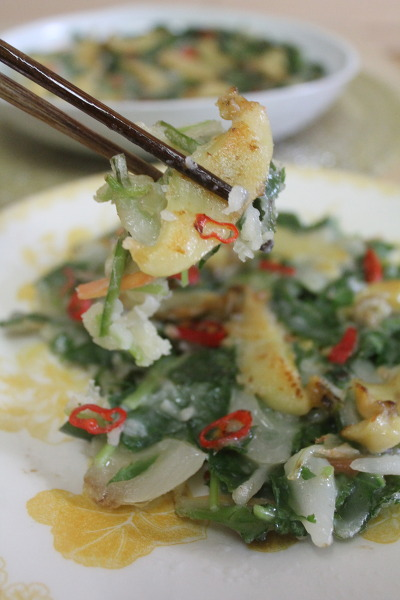
Jeonbok-chamnamul-buchimgae (abalone and pimpinella pancake)

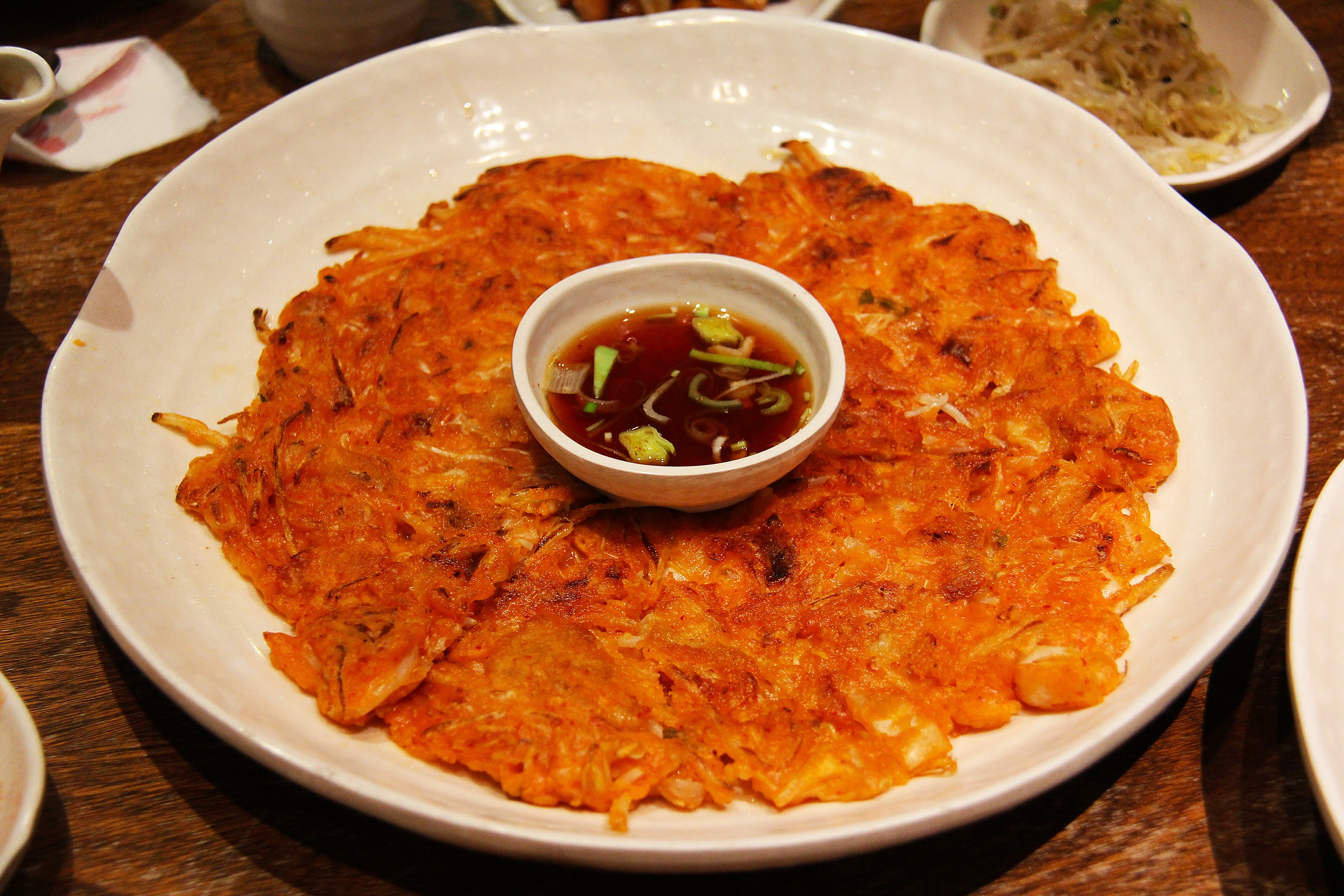
Kimchi-buchimgae (kimchi pancake)

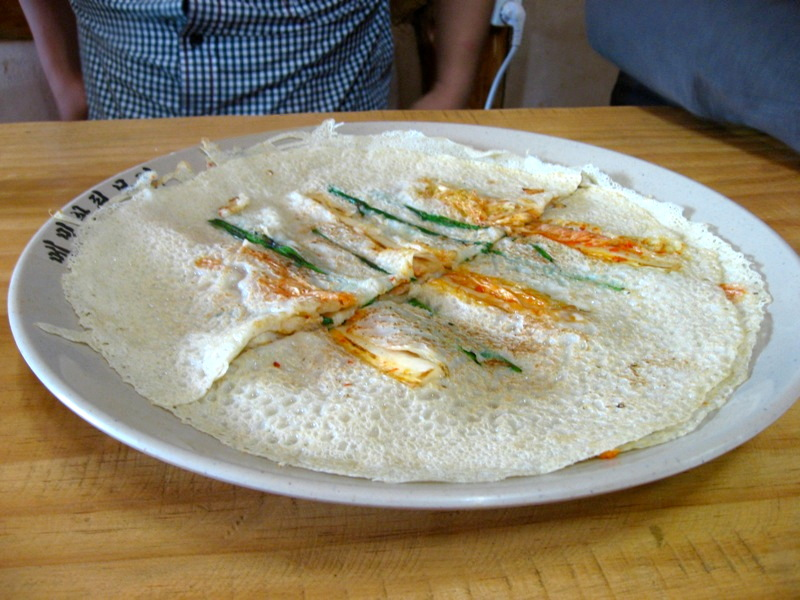
Memil-buchimgae (buckwheat pancake)

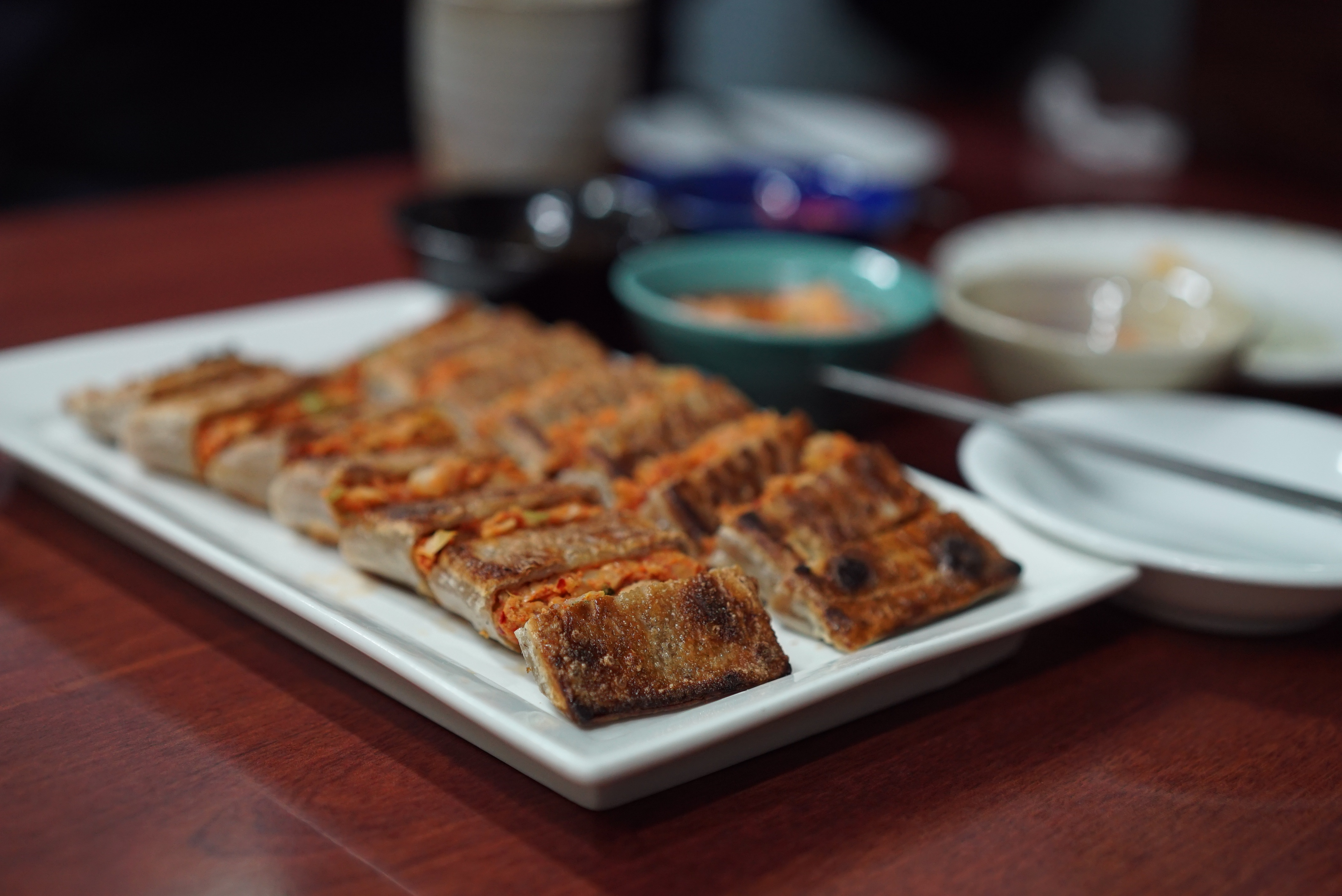
Stuffed mil-jeonbyeong (wheat pancake)

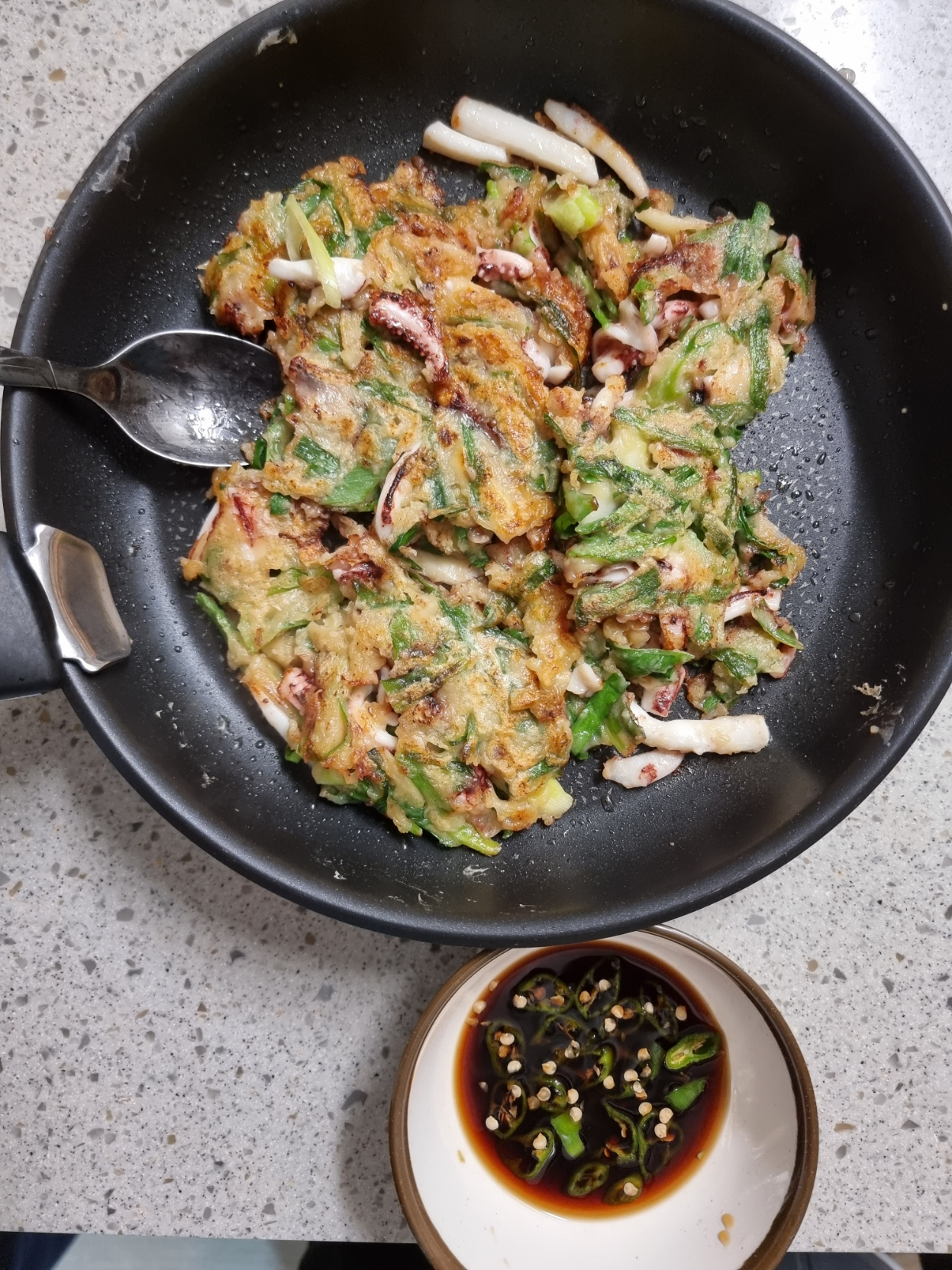
Squid-buchimgae (squid pancake)

== See also ==
- Bánh xèo
- Okonomiyaki
