= Kimchi-buchimgae =

Kimchi pancake

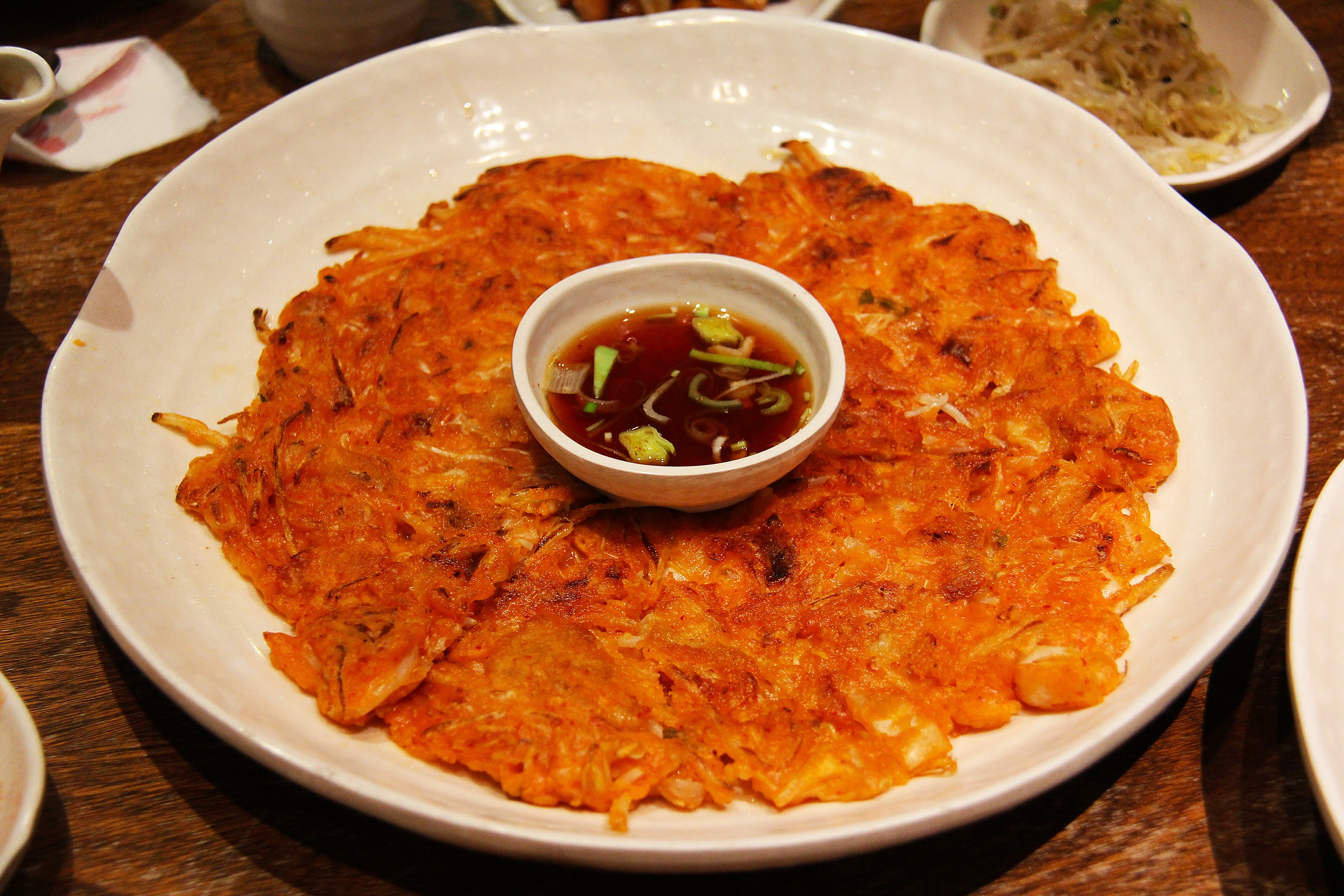
- Alternative names: Kimchi-jeon, kimchi pancake
- Type: Buchimgae
- Place of origin: Korea
- Main ingredients: Kimchi

Korean name
- Hangul: 김치부침개
- RR: gimchibuchimgae
- MR: kimch'ibuch'imgae
- IPA: [kim.tɕʰi.bu.tɕʰim.ɡɛ̝]

Alternate name
- Hangul: 김치전
- RR: gimchijeon
- MR: kimch'ijŏn
- IPA: [kim.tɕʰi.dʑʌn]

Kimchi-buchimgae (Korean: 김치부침개) or kimchi-jeon (김치전) is a variety of buchimgae or jeon. It is primarily made with sliced kimchi, flour batter and sometimes other vegetables. However, meat (ground pork) is also often added. Kimchi, spicy pickled vegetables seasoned with chili pepper and jeotgal, is a staple in Korean cuisine. The dish is good for using up ripened kimchi. Kimchibuchimgae is often recognized in Korean culture as a folk dish of low profile that anyone could make easily at home with no extra budget.

It is usually served as a banchan (appetizer or snack).

When preparing kimchi-jeon, brine from kimchi is often added, especially that of baechu-kimchi, made from napa cabbage. The brine lends its red color to the batter but is not spicy itself. Along with kimchi, it is served as anju with alcoholic beverages such as makgeolli or dongdongju. These days, in addition to the basic ingredients, it is often made with ingredients such as seafood or cheese.

== See also ==
- Jeon (food)
- Pajeon
- Bindaetteok
