= Bindae-tteok =

Korean fried mung bean pancake

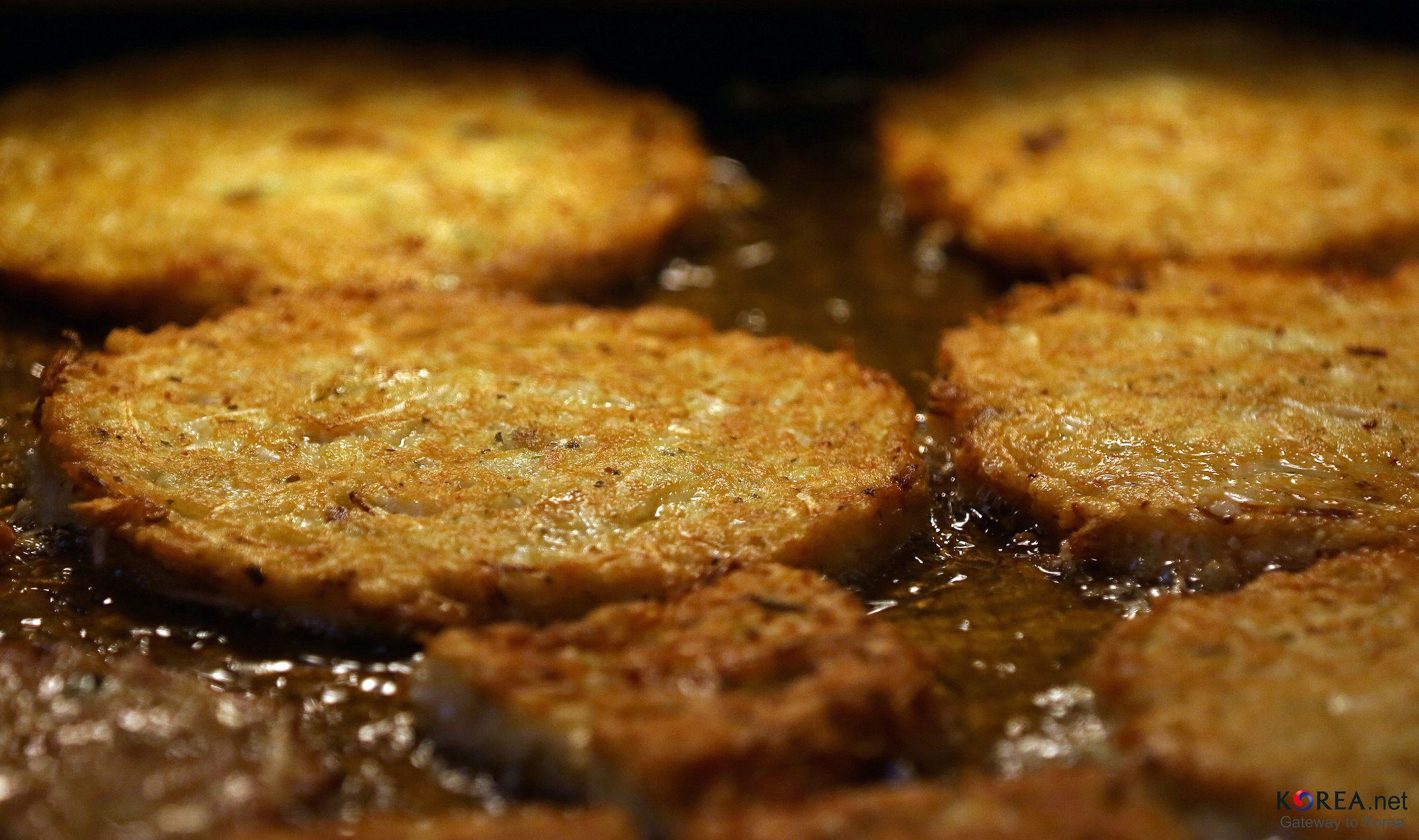
- Bindae-tteok being fried in Gwangjang Market
- Alternative names: Mung bean pancake, nokdu-buchimgae, nokdu-jeon, nokdu-jeonbyeong, nokdu-jijim
- Type: Buchimgae
- Place of origin: Korea
- Associated cuisine: Korean cuisine
- Main ingredients: Mung beans
- Food energy (per 1 serving): 35 kcal (150 kJ)

Korean name
- Hangul: 빈대떡
- RR: bindaetteok
- MR: pindaettŏk
- IPA: [pin.dɛ̝.t͈ʌk̚]

Bindae-tteok (Korean: 빈대떡), or mung bean pancake, is a type of buchimgae (Korean pancake) that originated in the Pyongan Province. It is made by grinding soaked mung beans, adding vegetables and meat and pan-frying it into a round, flat shape.

== Etymology and history ==
=== Bindae-tteok ===
Bindae-tteok first appears under the name pincya (빈쟈) in the Guidebook of Homemade Food and Drinks, a 1670 cookbook written by Chang Kyehyang. The word appears to be derived from pingcya (빙쟈), the Middle Korean transcription of the hanja word 餠𩜼, whose first character is pronounced bǐng and means "round and flat pancake-like food". The pronunciation and the meaning of the second letter are unknown. Tteok (떡) means a steamed, boiled, or pan-fried cake (usually a rice cake but in this case a pancake).

During the Joseon era (1392–1897), richer households would dispense bindae-tteok to poorer people gathered outside the South Great Gate of Seoul during times of hardship.

Bindaetteok was often eaten in the northwestern part of Hwanghae-do and Pyeongan-do.

=== Gwangjang Market ===
Gwangjang Market was established in 1905, and was one of the first permanent street food markets in the area. Most market places would only open for a few days, while Gwangjang Market was open everyday since its establishment. It is now one of the most popular tourist locations that sell bindae-tteok.

== Preparation ==
Bindae-tteok is made with mung bean batter with a filling made of bracken, pork, mung bean sprouts, and baechu-kimchi (napa cabbage kimchi).

To make the filling for bindae-tteok, soaked bracken is cut into short pieces, mixed with ground pork, and seasoned with soy sauce, chopped scallions, minced garlic, ground black pepper, and sesame oil. Mung bean sprouts are washed, blanched, cut into short pieces and seasoned with salt and sesame oil. Kimchi is unstuffed and squeezed to remove its fillings and excess juice, then cut into small pieces. The ingredients are then mixed.

Washed, soaked, and husked mung beans are ground with water and seasoned with salt to make the batter.

The mung bean batter is ladled on a hot frying pan greased with a considerable amount of cooking oil, topped with the filling, and followed by another layer of the batter poured over the top of the filling. Finally, the bindae-tteok is topped with pieces of diagonally sliced green and red chili pepper. The pancakes are pan-fried on both sides, and served with a dipping sauce consisting of soy sauce, vinegar, water, and ground pine nuts.

== Gallery ==
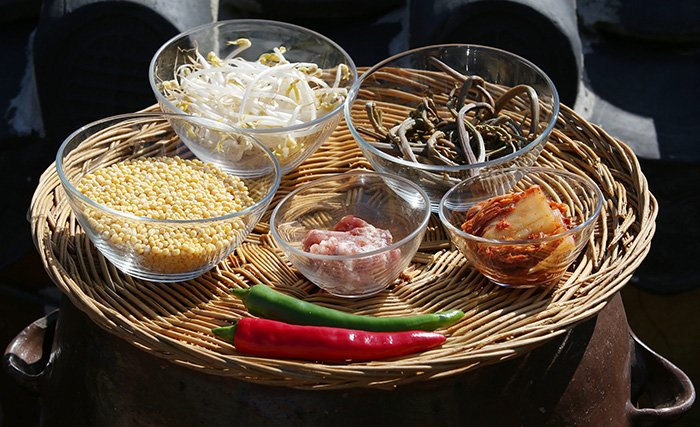
Ingredients for bindae-tteok

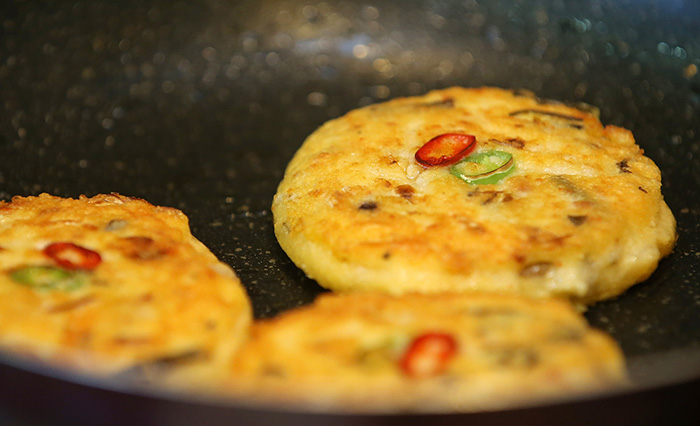
Pan-frying bindae-tteok

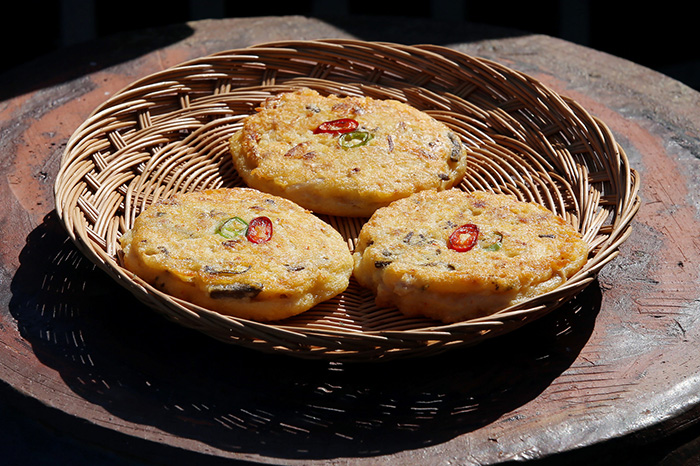
Bindae-tteok

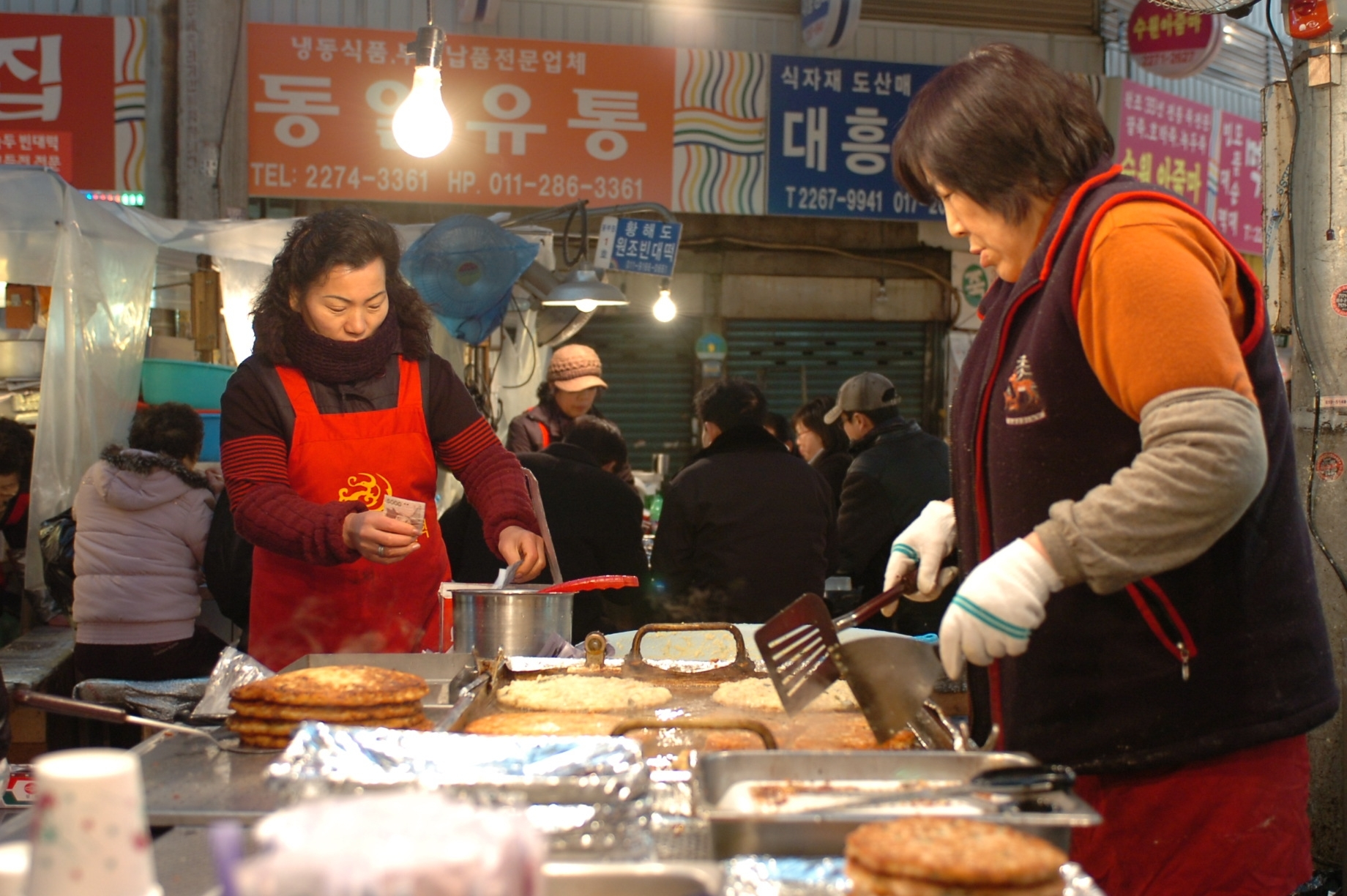
Street food bindae-tteok

== In popular culture ==
Bindae-tteok is prepared and sold in traditional street markets such as Gwangjang Market in Seoul. It gained increased international recognition once Bindae-tteok vendors were featured in the 2019 Netflix documentary series Street Food. The series highlighted Korean street food culture and vendors operating in Gwangjang Market, where bindae-tteok is a staple dish.

Global exposure increased tourism and interest in Korean street food markets, with Gwangjang Market becoming a widely visited destination for both domestic visitors and international tourists seeking to try traditional dishes.

== See also ==
- Pajeon
- Gamjajeon
- Kimchijeon
- Pesarattu
