= Vanndy Hem =

Cambodian economist and politician

H.E. Hem Vanndy
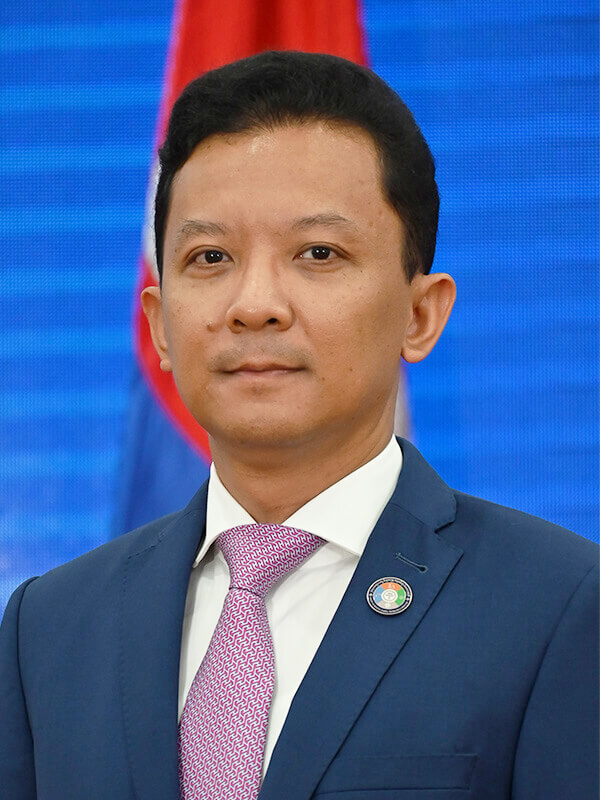

Minister of Industry, Science, Technology and Innovation
- In office 22 August 2023 – Current
- Preceded by: Cham Prasidh

Personal details
- Born: 25 October 1979 (age 46) Koh Sotin district, Kampong Cham province, Cambodia
- Party: Cambodian People's Party
- Education: National University of Management (BA); International University of Japan (MA); Harvard Kennedy School (MPA)

Hem Vanndy (Khmer: ហែម វណ្ណឌី) is a Cambodian politician and civil servant who has served as the Minister of Industry, Science, Technology & Innovation since 22 August 2023. He previously served as Secretary of State at the Ministry of Economy and Finance and is a member of the Supreme National Economic Council.

== Early life and education ==
Vanndy earned a Bachelor of Business Administration from the National Institute of Management (Cambodia) in 1999, a Master of Arts in International Development from the International University of Japan in 2002, and a Mid-Career Master in Public Administration (Mason Fellow) from the Harvard Kennedy School in 2014.[1]

== Early career ==
After graduating, Vanndy joined PricewaterhouseCoopers in Cambodia as an auditor and later interned at Fuji Xerox in Kawasaki, Japan. He then worked as a teaching and research assistant at the International University of Japan while pursuing his master’s degree. From December 2002 to September 2003 he was a National Programme Officer at UNFPA, and from 2003 to 2008 he served as an Economics and Financial Sector Officer at the Asian Development Bank’s Cambodia Resident Mission. He subsequently served as Deputy Secretary-General at the Cambodia Mine Action Authority and held roles in the Office of the Council of Ministers.[2]

== Political career ==
In September 2013, Vanndy was appointed Under Secretary of State at the Ministry of Economy and Finance, while he was pursuing his study. He assumed office in June 2014 where he was responsible for development financing, official development assistance (ODA) coordination, and public debt management, while also coordinating inter-ministerial mechanisms on infrastructure and urbanization.[3]

He was appointed Minister of Industry, Science, Technology & Innovation in the cabinet of Prime Minister Hun Manet, with the new government sworn in on 22 August 2023.[4] Since then, Vanndy has assumed multiple national leadership roles advancing Cambodia’s agenda in industrial development, small and medium enterprises (SMEs) and handicrafts, potable water supply, science, technology and innovation (STI), entrepreneurship ecosystem building, development of informal economy, and national quality infrastructure.

As Chair of the Board of Trustees of the newly established National Research Foundation, Vanndy provides strategic oversight of the institution responsible for mobilizing and managing research funding, strengthening links between research and national priorities, and supporting the translation of research into practical and commercial applications. The Foundation is intended to help advance Cambodia’s research and development agenda and strengthen the country’s research and innovation ecosystem.[8]

He has represented the country in regional frameworks, promoting collaborative initiatives on technology transfer, digital innovation, and industrial competitiveness within ASEAN.[6]

As Chair of the National Council of Science, Technology & Innovation, Vanndy has overseen policies to strengthen Cambodia’s STI ecosystem, encouraging research, innovation, and investment in science and technology as drivers of national development.[7]

Through his role as Chair of the National Standards Council, he has presided over the adoption of new Cambodian Standards drawn from ISO, IEC and ISO/IEC, enabling local businesses to align with international benchmarks, improve product safety, and access export markets.[8]

As Chair of the National Accreditation Council of Cambodia, he has guided reforms in accreditation to ensure laboratories and conformity assessment bodies meet international requirements, thereby improving the credibility of Cambodian products and services abroad.[9]

Finally, as Chair of the Coordinating Committee for Developing the Informal Economy, Vanndy has coordinated the Royal Government’s efforts to onboard informal workers and businesses onto digital platforms, expand access to finance, and provide social protection and other benefits.[10]

== Academic affiliation ==
• Visiting Lecturer (Public Sector Innovation), International College, National University of Management, Phnom Penh (Oct 2022 – Jan 2023)

== Social affiliations ==
• Member of the Standing Committee of the Union of Youth Federations of Cambodia (UYFC) (2024–present) • Member of the Central Committee of the Union of Youth Federations of Cambodia (UYFC) (2022–present) • Member of the Board of Directors of the Khmer Silk Center, Royal University of Phnom Penh (2020–2023)

== Political affiliation ==
• Member of the Central Committee of the Cambodian People’s Party (CPP) (2023–present)

== Personal life & belief ==
Vanndy was born in Koh Sotin District, Kampong Cham Province, Cambodia. He is married and has two daughters.[12] He believes in the teachings of Buddha and their applications to enhance the quality of life, improve governance and embolden success. He may be seen as a quiet but sharp, gentle but firm, and intelligent yet huble. He adores arts and enjoys Cambodian gangible and intangible cultural heritage.

== Honors and awards ==
Vanndy has received several distinctions in recognition of his service to the Royal Government of Cambodia and his contributions to national development: • Medal of National Merit, Grand Cross and Grand Officer of the Royal Order of Cambodia
