= Pajeon =

Korean pan-fried scallion dish

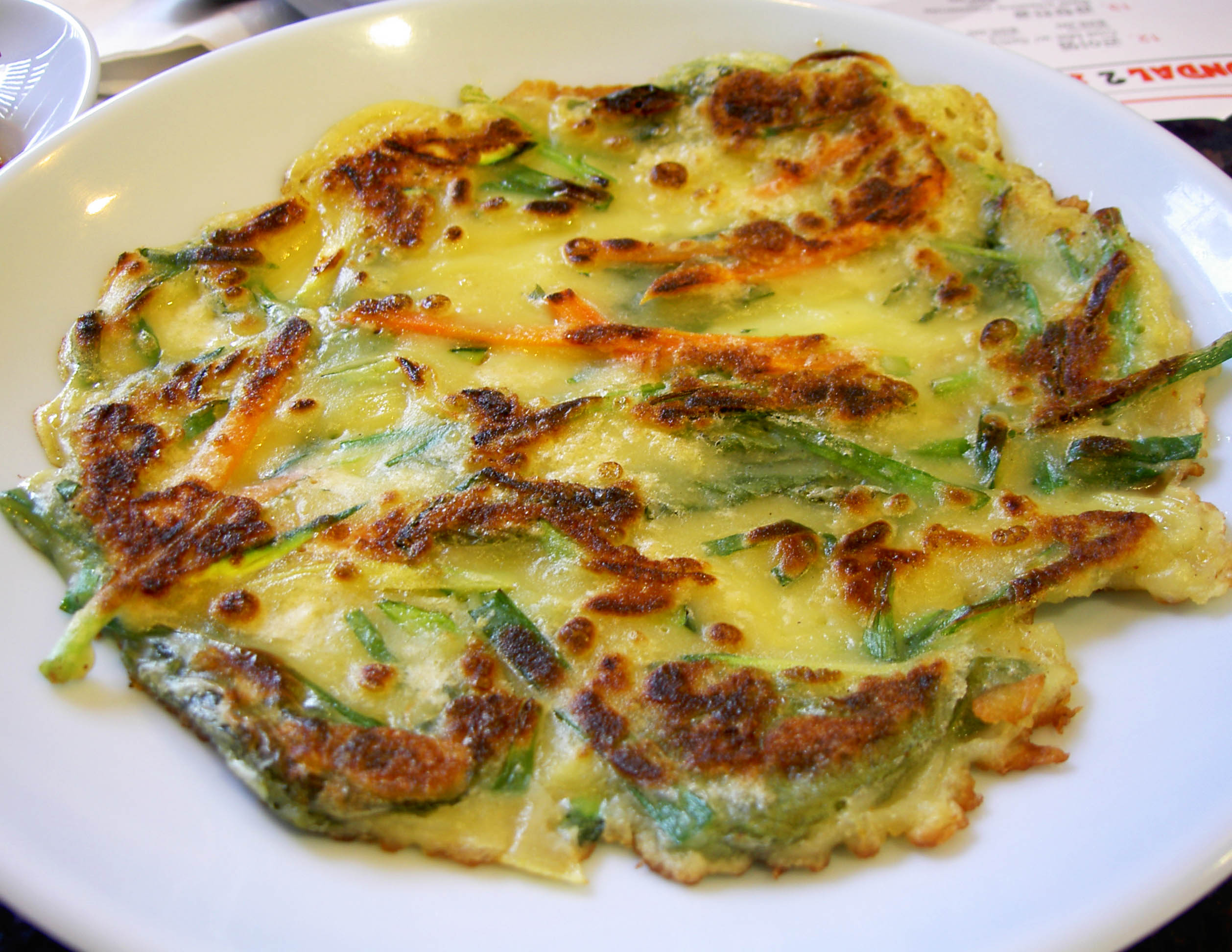
- pajeon, scallion pancake
- Type: Jeon
- Place of origin: Korea
- Main ingredients: Batter (eggs, wheat flour, rice flour, scallions)

Korean name
- Hangul: 파전
- Hanja: 파煎
- RR: pajeon
- MR: p'ajŏn
- IPA: [pʰa.dʑʌn]

Pajeon (Korean: 파전; pronounced [pʰa.dʑʌn]) is a variety of jeon with scallion as its prominent ingredient, as pa (파) means 'scallion'. It is a Korean dish made from a batter of eggs, wheat flour, rice flour, scallions, and often other ingredients depending on the variety. Beef, pork, kimchi, shellfish, and other seafood are mostly used. If one of these ingredients, such as squid, dominates the jeon, the name will reflect that; e.g. ojingeo jeon (오징어전) is 'squid jeon'.

Pajeon is usually recognizable by the highly visible scallions. It is similar to a Chinese scallion pancake in appearance; however, unlike the Chinese dish (but like Western pancakes), it is made from a liquid batter and thus has a lighter texture.

== Preparation ==
It is made by placing jjokpa scallions parallel on a hot pan with vegetable oil, pan-frying them, then ladling onto them a batter made from wheat flour, water, doenjang (soybean paste), and sugar. The pancake is turned over when the bottom holds together and is golden brown. It is usually served with a slightly sweet dipping sauce called cho ganjang (초간장), which usually consists of soy sauce, vinegar, sesame oil, and other seasonings.

== Type ==
Some varieties of pajeon, with the shape of scallions preserved as in dongnae pajeon, are typical jeon. Some other varieties, with the scallions cut and mixed into the batter, are closer to buchimgae.

=== Seafood pajeon ===
In Korean, a seafood pajeon is called haemul pajeon (해물파전). Various seafood are used in the batter and toppings, e.g., oysters, shrimp, squid, clams.

=== Dongnae pajeon ===
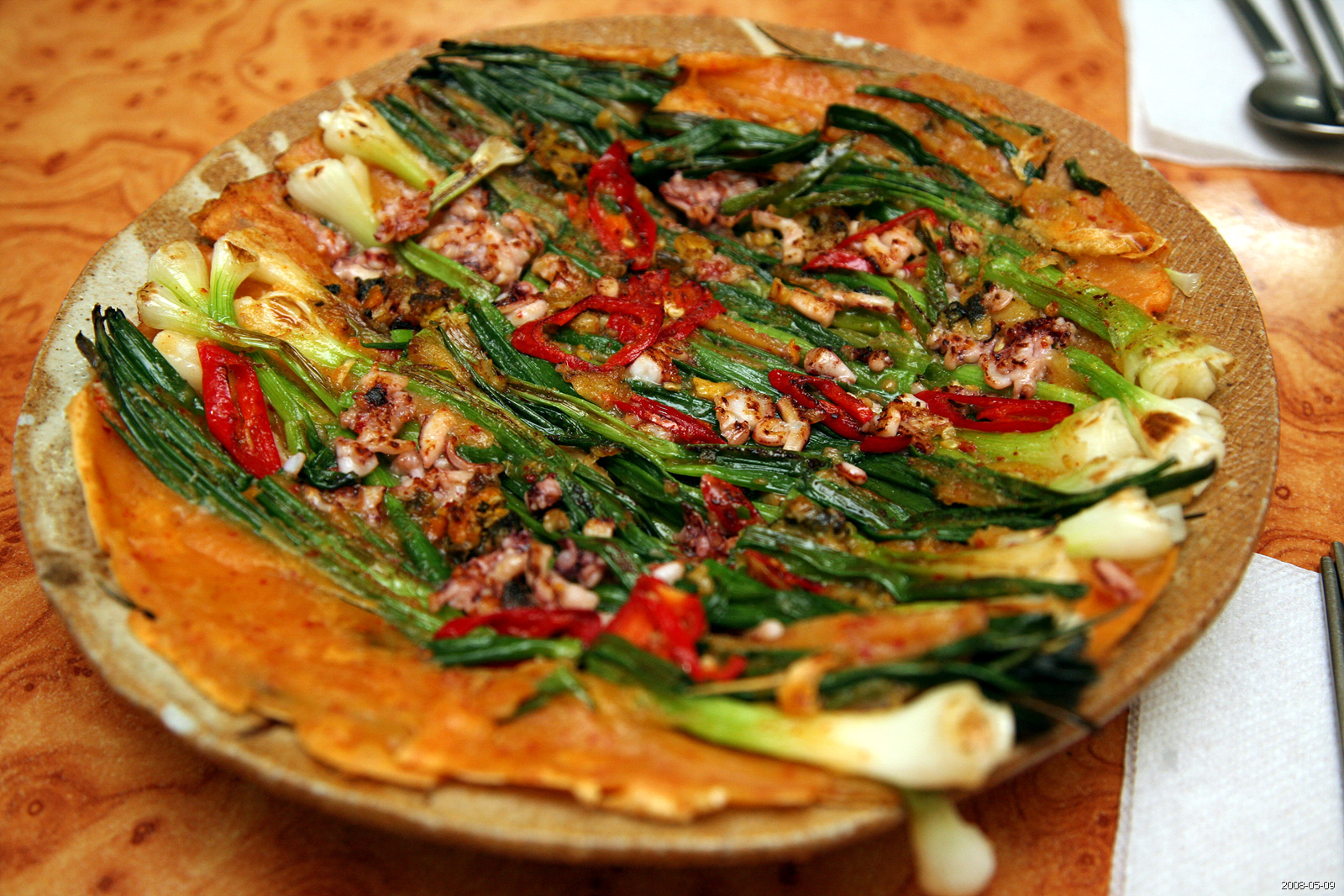
Dongnae pajeon

Dongnae pajeon is named after Dongnaeeupseong, a fortress of the Joseon period that is now located in Busan. Dongnae was a prominent battleground during the Imjin War and legend says the people of Dongnae threw scallions while defeating the invading Japanese soldiers. Dongnae pajeon was made in honor of the victory.

The dish was also presented at the king's table and became popular when the Dongnae market flourished in the Joseon era.

Dongnae pajeon is usually made from a batter of rice flour, glutinous rice flour, eggs, and gochujang. Soft scallions, beef, clams, mussels, oysters, shrimp and other seafood are added.

== Gallery ==
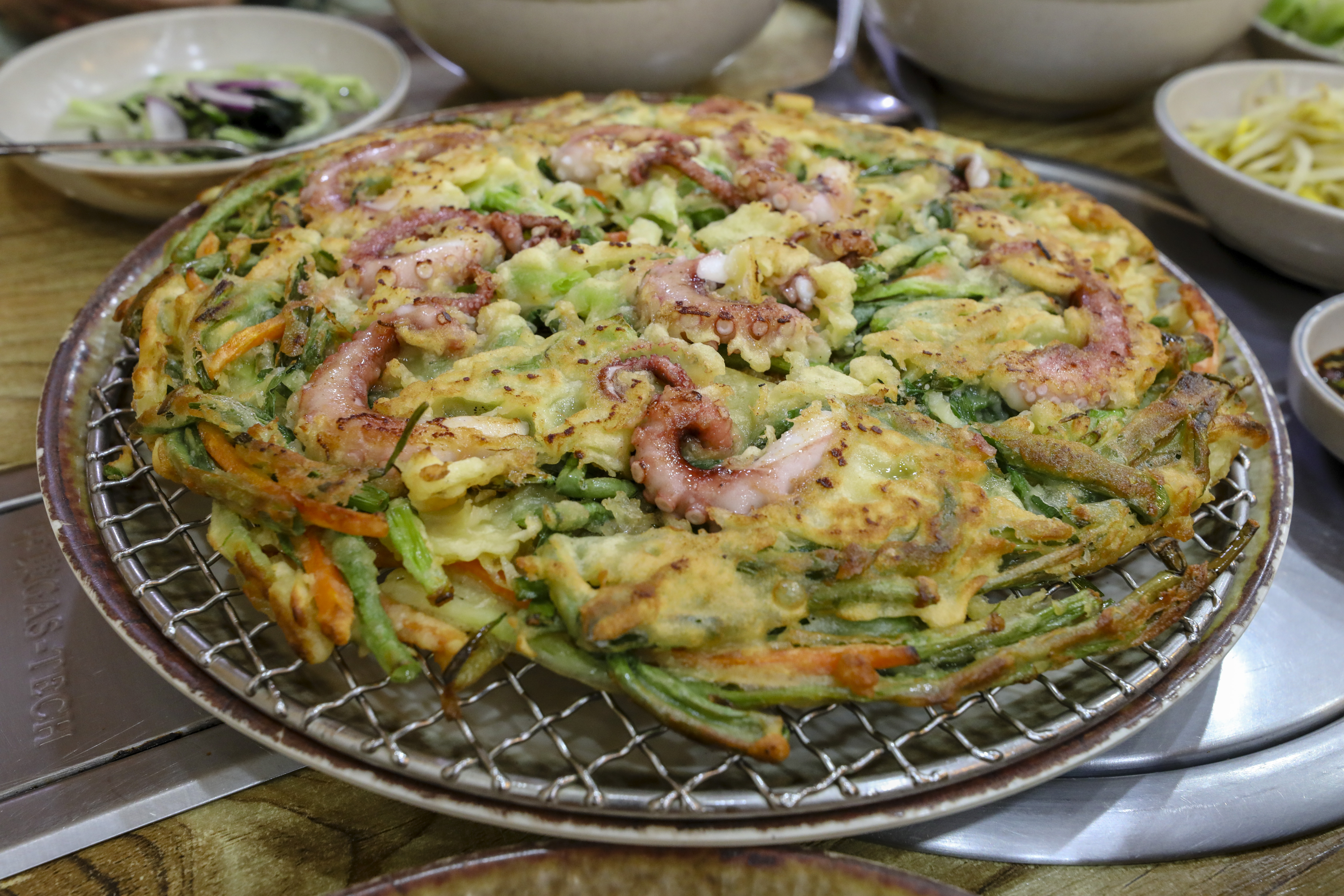

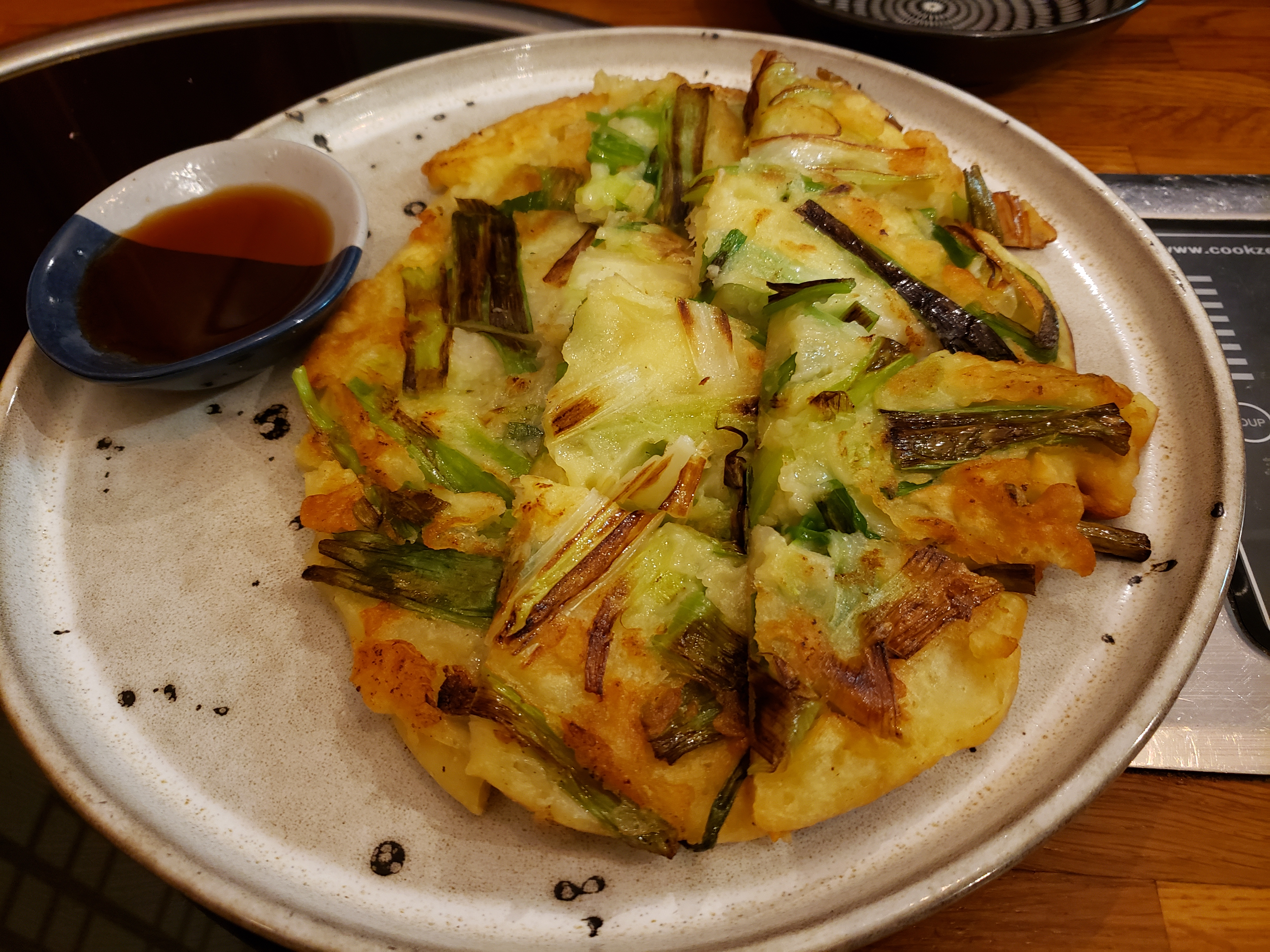

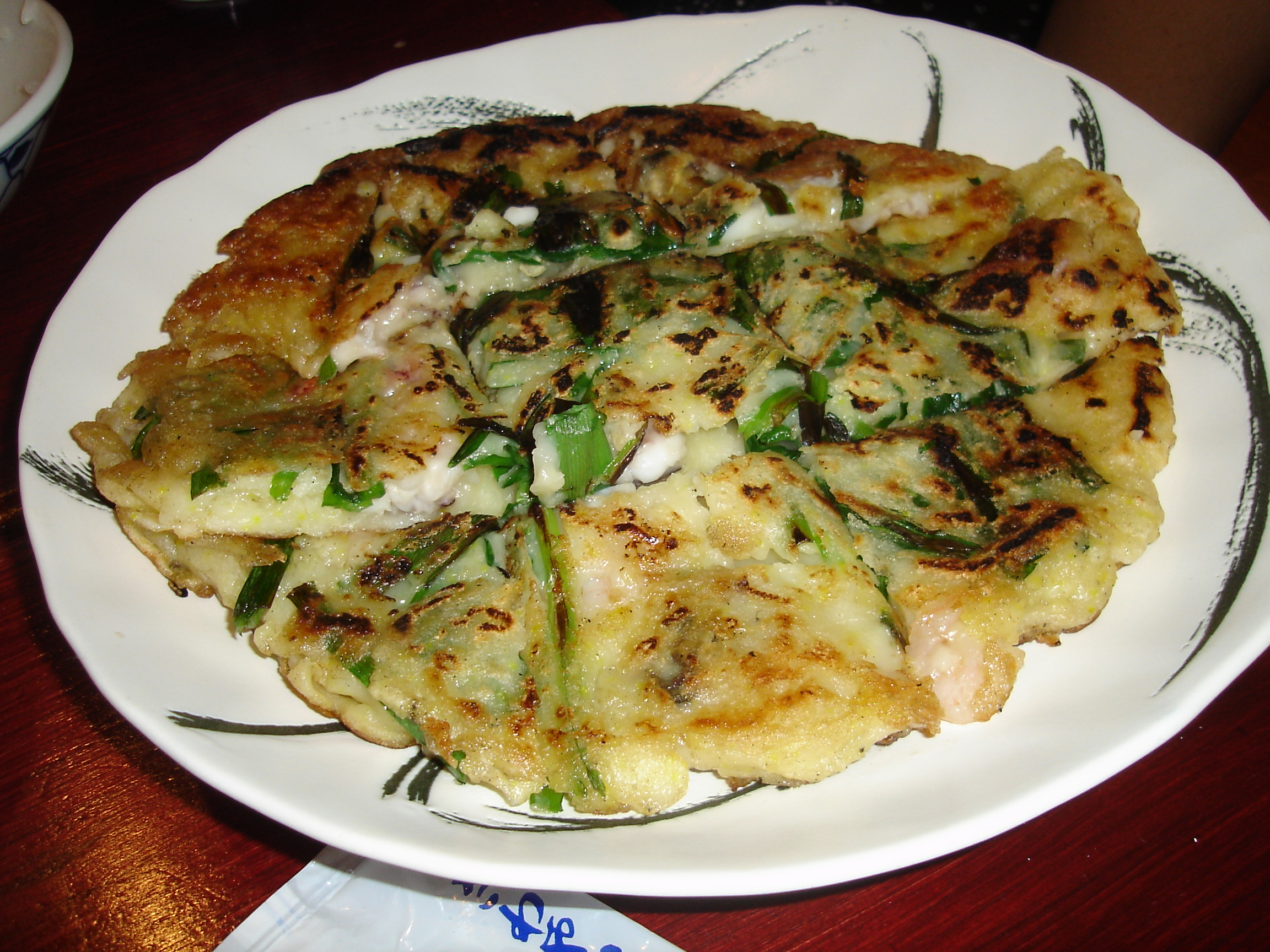

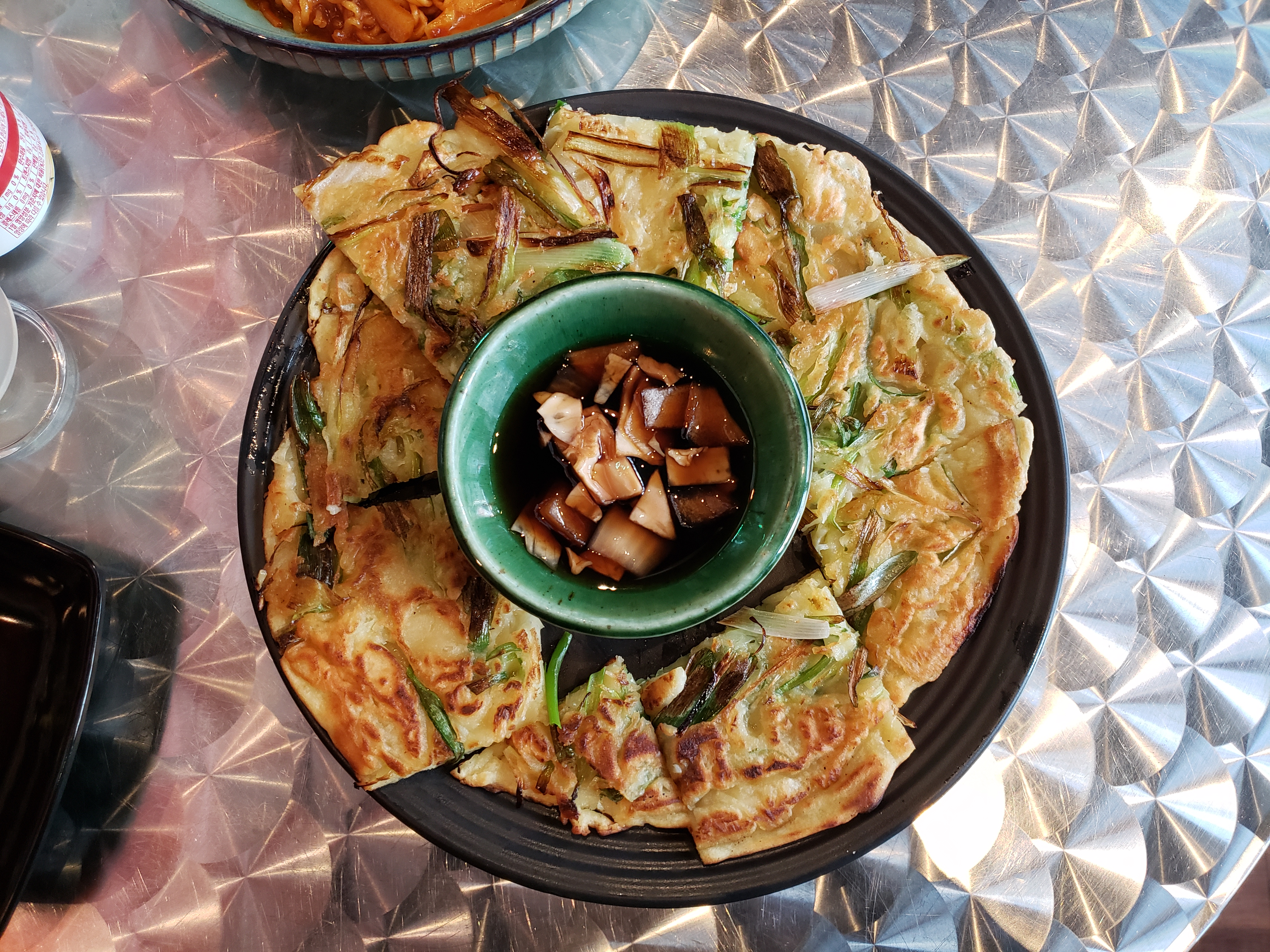

== See also ==
- Bindaetteok
- Gamjajeon
- Kimchijeon
- List of onion dishes

=== Other countries ===
- Bánh xèo (Vietnamese)
- Cōngyóubǐng (Chinese) (simplified Chinese: 葱油饼; traditional Chinese: 蔥油餅; pinyin: cōngyóubǐng)
- Negiyaki (ねぎ焼き), variant of okonomiyaki (Japanese)
- Oyster omelette
