= Cham Prasidh =

Cambodian politician

His Excellency Cham Prasidh MP
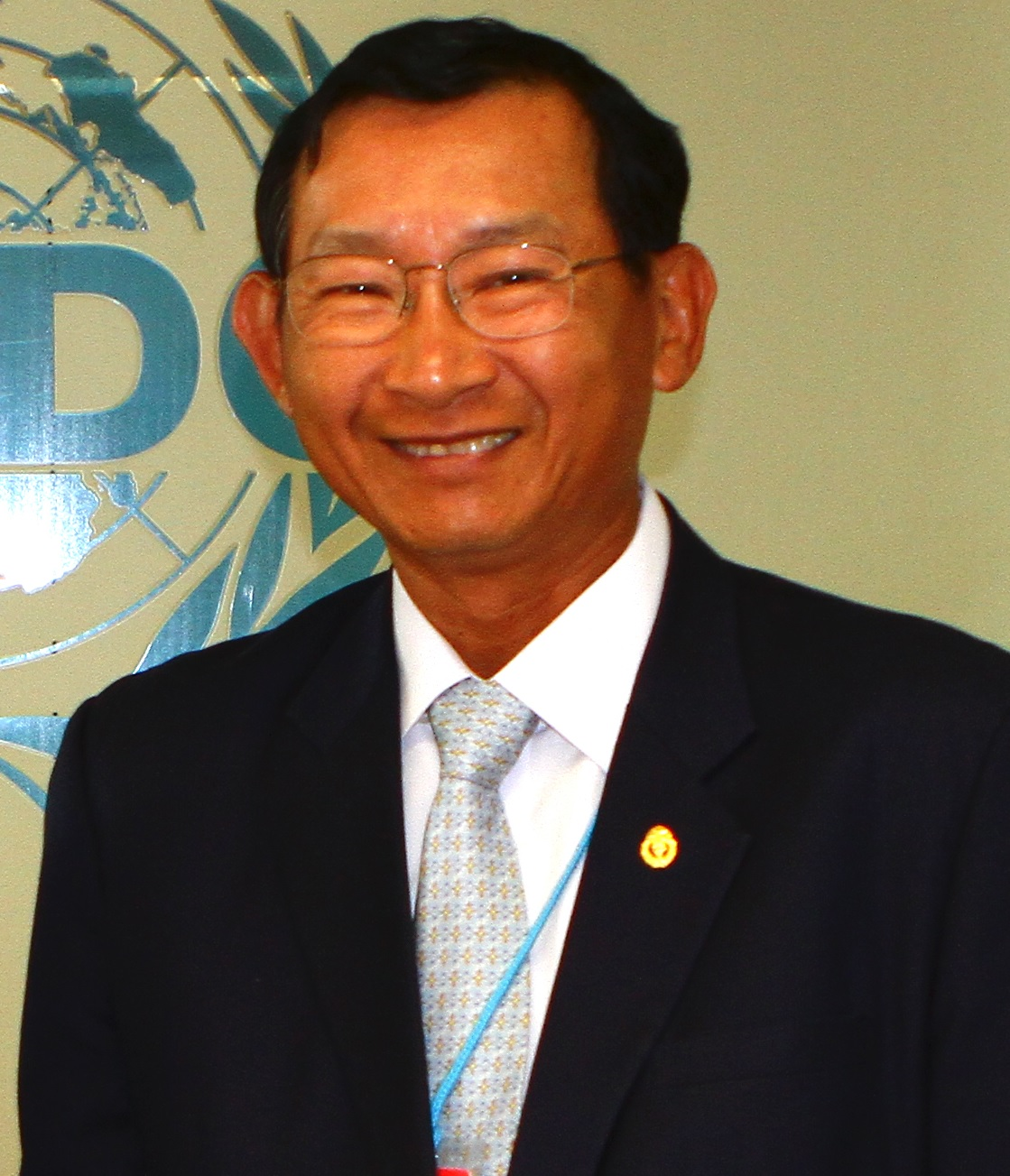
- Prasidh in 2014

Minister of Industry, Science, Technology and Innovation (Note: Minister of Industry and Handicrafts from 2013 to 2020.)
- In office 24 September 2013 – 22 August 2023
- Prime Minister: Hun Sen
- Preceded by: Suy Sem, as Minister of Industry, Mines and Energy
- Succeeded by: Vanndy Hem
Further information
Minister of Commerce
In office 24 October 1994 – 24 September 2013
Prime Minister	Norodom Ranariddh; Ung Huot; Hun Sen
Preceded by	Var Huot
Succeeded by	Sun Chanthol
Member of Parliament for Siem Reap
In office 25 November 1998 – 28 July 2013
Member of Parliament for Kep
Incumbent
Assumed office 23 September 2013
Majority	10,134 (50.72%)

Personal details
- Born: Ung You Teckhor; 15 May 1951 (age 75) Phnom Penh, Cambodia
- Party: Cambodian People's Party
- Spouse: Tep Bopha
- Children: Cham Nimul
- Education: University of Phnom Penh

Cham Prasidh (Khmer: ចម ប្រសិទ្ធ; born 15 May 1951) is the Cambodian former Minister of Industry, Science, Technology and Innovation. His Chinese name is 黃裕德虎. Mr Prasidh previously served as a Senior Minister and Minister of Commerce for 19 years (1994-2013). He is a member of the Cambodian People's Party and was elected to represent Siem Reap Province in the National Assembly of Cambodia in 1993, 1998, and 2003 and was elected to represent Kep Province in 2008, 2013, 2018 and 2023

Cham was born Ung You Teckhor to an ethnic Chinese family who were engaged in Entrepot trade. His father, Ung You Y, served as the member of parliament for Stung Treng province during Lon Nol's regime before the Khmer Rouge took over Cambodia.

After the 2013 general elections, the Ministry of Industry, Mines, and Energy was split into two separate ministries: the Ministry of Industry and the Handicrafts and Ministry of Mines and Energy with the reasoning that the scale of work was too big for one ministry to handle. Since March 2020, the ministry was revamped as Ministry of Industry, Science, Technology & Innovation.
