= Bánh xèo =

Vietnamese stuffed pancake

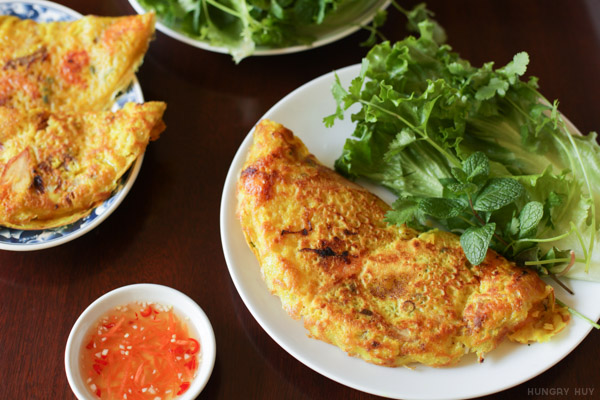
- Vietnamese bánh xèo including thai basil, mint leaves, lettuce, and dipping sauce
- Type: Pancake or crepe
- Course: Main course
- Place of origin: Đàng Trong
- Associated cuisine: Vietnamese
- Serving temperature: Usually served hot
- Main ingredients: Rice flour, water, turmeric powder
- Similar dishes: Bánh khoái

Bánh xèo (Vietnamese: [ɓǎɲ ɕɛ̀w], lit. 'sizzling pancake') is a crispy, stuffed rice crepe popular in Vietnam. The name refers to the sound (from xèo – 'sizzling') a thin layer of rice batter makes when it is poured into the hot skillet. It is a savoury fried pancake made of rice flour, water, and turmeric powder. It can also be called a Vietnamese crêpe. Some common stuffings include pork, prawns, diced green onion, mung bean, and bean sprouts. Bánh xèo is often served with side dishes. Usually, some commonly added ingredients include leafy greens like lettuces or perilla leaves, other herbs as flavor enhancers like mint leaves and Thai basil, cucumbers, and pickled vegetables, usually carrots and radishes. Its dipping sauce is nước chấm (sweet and sour garlic fish sauce).

== History ==
Bánh xèo is a traditional street food in Vietnam. The working class mainly ate it because it was cheap and easy. Its origins are unknown. However, Vietnamese people agreed that the creation of this dish could be somewhere in Central Vietnam through the fusion of French culture from the French colonial times or South Vietnam by migrating immigrants moving into Vietnam and mixing with the surrounding culture.

Through the years, bánh xèo has expanded to other nearby Southeast Asian countries like Cambodia and Thailand. Bánh xèo has become more popular as more affluent people started to realize its savory taste and new restaurants opening such as Banh Xeo Muoi Xiem and An La Ghien, stated Saigoneers in 2016.

On the 2nd and 16th of each lunar month, some Vietnamese people substitute bánh xèo for rice.

== Variations ==
Regional variations include:

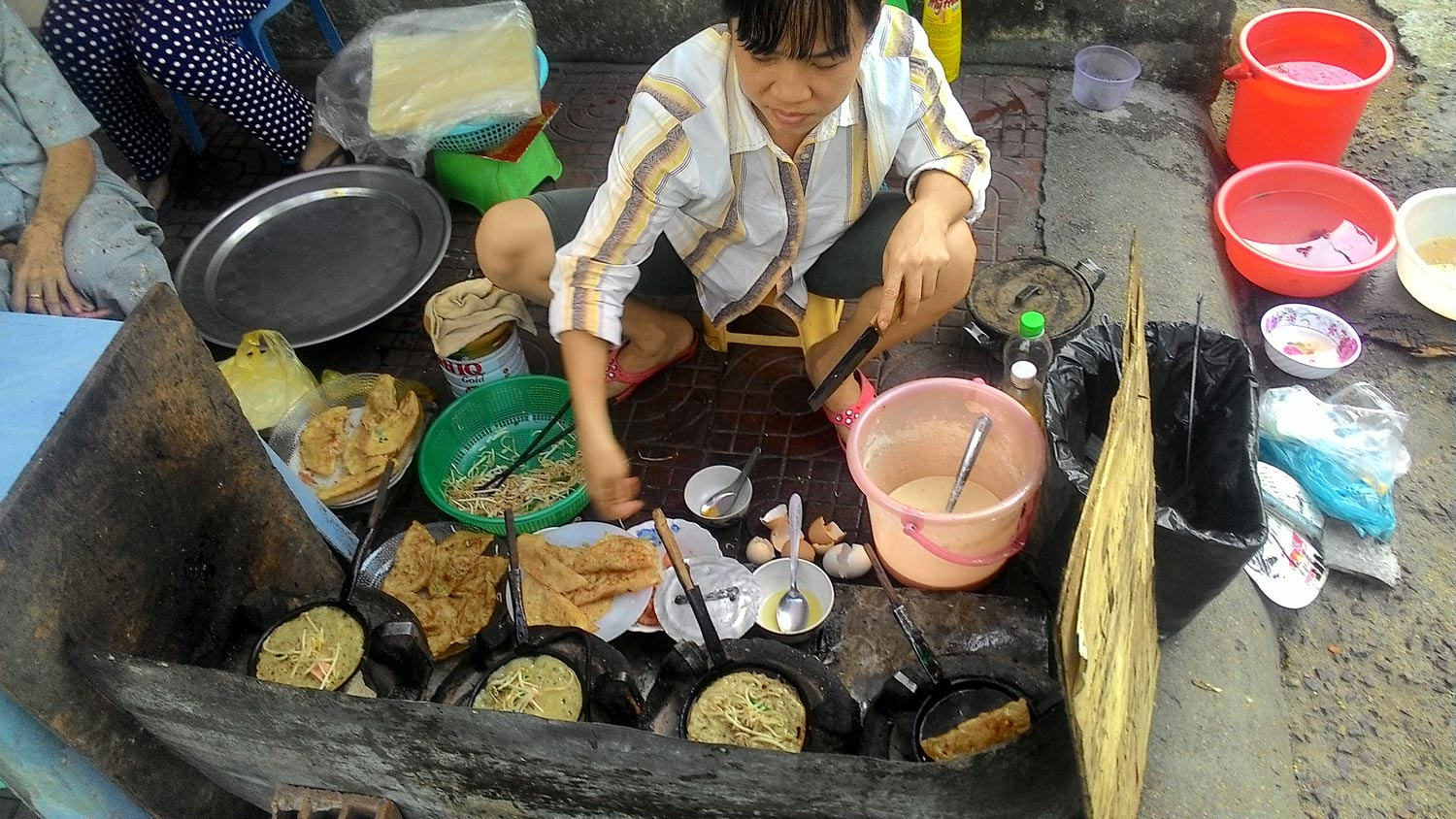
Bánh xèo: Miền Trung

- Miền Trung (Central Vietnam) style bánh xèo tends to be smaller, about the size of a hand. Compared to the Miền Tây version, the Miền Trung version has few fillings. Fillings include prawns, thin slices of pork, and bean sprouts. This version may be darker or not as yellow as other variations because of the addition of fermented shrimp paste, adding a distinct taste and color to the dish.

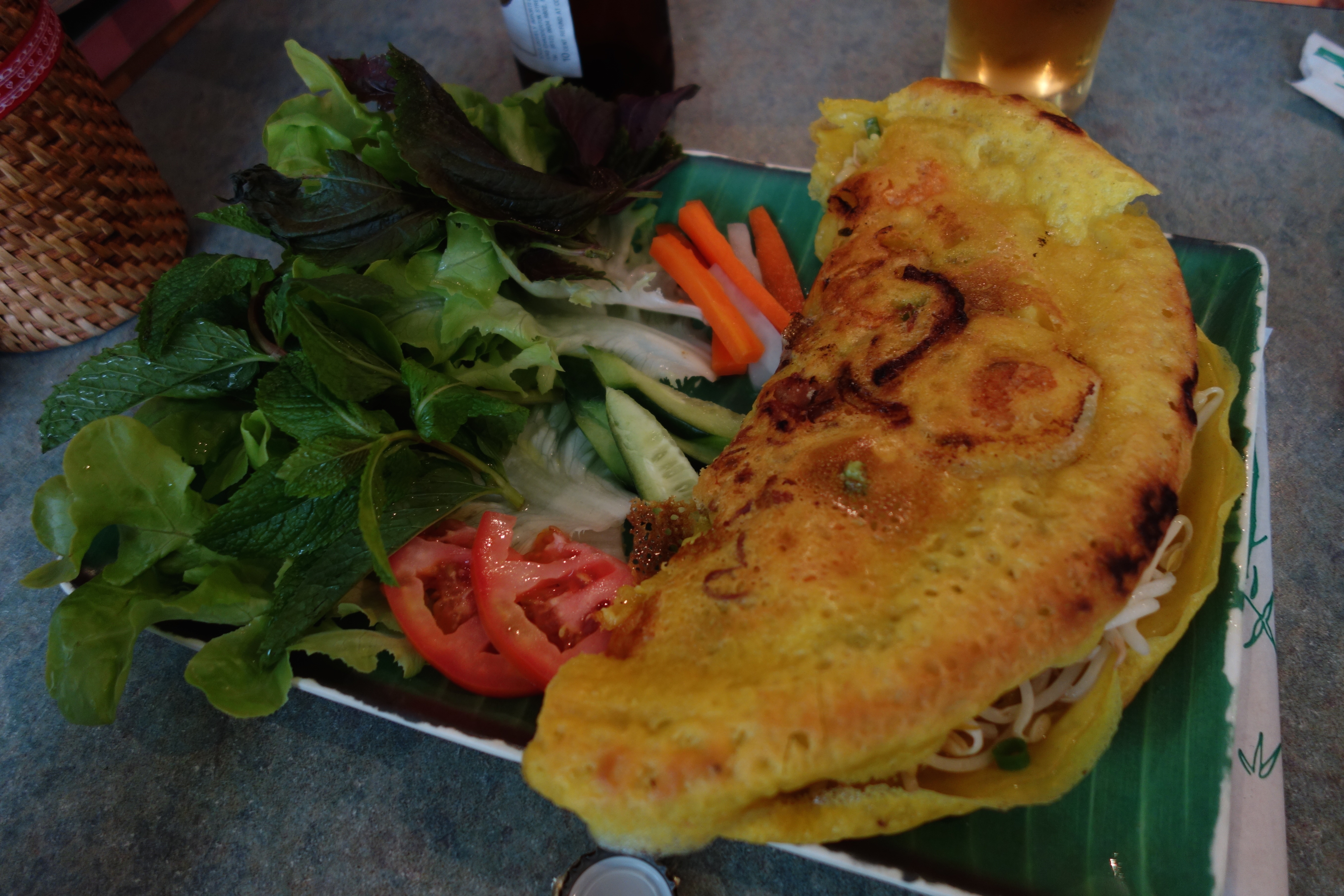
Bánh xèo: Miền Tây Image includes tomatoes, carrots and radishs, cucumber, herbs and lettuce, as well as dipping sauce.

- Miền Tây (Mekong Delta) style bánh xèo tends to be larger than the Miền Trung version, usually about the size of a small-to-medium-sized pizza, about 12 inches (300 mm) in diameter. However, they are generally thinner. Miền Tây offers a more diverse range of ingredients and fillings. Because of this, the color of the bánh xèo is usually brighter as the batter with turmeric and coconut milk creates a colorful yellow dish. Fillings include prawns, pork belly, green onions, fried onions, and bean sprouts.

== Bánh khoái ==
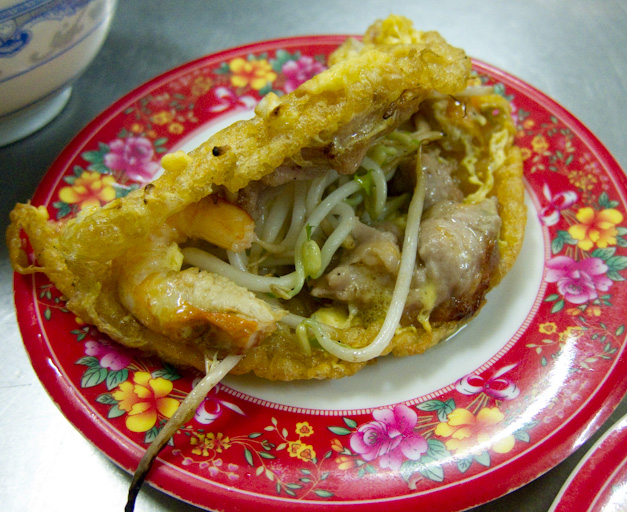
Bánh khoái is eaten with fresh vegetables, star fruit, jackfruit, and dipping sauce.

Bánh khoái is a type of crispy pancake made from a batter of rice flour, water, and egg yolks. It is typically filled with shrimp, pork, and bean sprouts, and is shaped like a half-moon. The batter is poured into a hot pan and cooked until golden brown. Bánh khoái is often served with fresh herbs and a dipping sauce. The origin of the name "Bánh khoái" has various explanations. Some believe that the original name was "bánh khói". Huế is famous for its bánh khoái Thượng Tứ, which is located southeast of the city's Citadel.

== Popularity ==
The dish is also popular in Cambodia, where the dish is called banh chao (Khmer: បាញ់ឆែវ).

There is also a Thai version of bánh xèo called Khanom bueang Yuan (Thai: ขนมเบื้องญวน). It is offered by some street vendors and is available at many Bangkok restaurants serving Thai or royal cuisine.

== Similar dishes ==
- Bánh cuốn
- Cong you bing
- Crêpe
- Jianbing
- Okonomiyaki
- Pajeon
- Paratha
- Roti canai
