= Ministry of Industry, Science, Technology and Innovation (Cambodia) =

Government ministry of Cambodia

- ក្រសួងឧស្សាហកម្ម វិទ្យាសាស្ត្រ បច្ចេកវិទ្យា និងនវានុវត្តន៍ Krâsuŏng Ŭssahâkâmm, Vĭtyéasastr, Bâchchékâvĭtyéa nĭng Nôvéanŭvôttân

Agency overview
- Jurisdiction: Government of Cambodia
- Headquarters: 45 Preah Norodom Blvd, Phnom Penh 120203
- Minister responsible: Vanndy Hem, Minister of Industry, Science, Technology and Innovation
- Website: misti.gov.kh

The Ministry of Industry, Science, Technology and Innovation (Khmer: ក្រសួងឧស្សាហកម្ម វិទ្យាសាស្ត្រ បច្ចេកវិទ្យា និងនវានុវត្តន៍, UNGEGN: Krâsuŏng Ŭssahâkâmm, Vĭtyéasastr, Bâchchékâvĭtyéa nĭng Nôvéanŭvôttân) is a government ministry responsible for industrial, science, technology, innovation policies in Cambodia. Its name was changed from the Ministry of Industry and Handicrafts in March 2020, in response to the fourth Industrial Revolution. The current minister is HEM Vanndy.
