= List of museums in Cambodia =

This is a list of museums in Cambodia.

== Museums in Cambodia ==
- Angkor Borei Museum
- Angkor Ceramic Museum at Tani
- Angkor National Museum
- Angkor Panorama Museum
- Battambang Provincial Museum
- Cambodian Cultural Village
- Cambodian Landmine Museum
- Choeung Ek
- Kampong Thom Museum
- MGC Asian Traditional Textiles Museum
- National Museum of Cambodia
- Preah Norodom Sihanouk-Angkor Museum
- Silver Pagoda
- Tuol Sleng Genocide Museum
- War Museum Cambodia
- SorSoror Museum Cambodia

== See also ==
- List of museums
- List of archives in Cambodia
- List of libraries in Cambodia
