= APSARA =

Cambodian government authority

APSARA National Authority
- អាជ្ញាធរជាតិអប្សរា
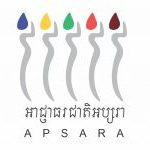

Agency overview
- Formed: 1995
- Jurisdiction: Royal Government of Cambodia
- Headquarters: Bang Korng Village, Ampil Commune, Prasat Bakong District, Siem Reap, Cambodia
- Agency executive: Hang Peou, Director General
- Parent agency: Ministry of Culture and Fine Arts; Ministry of Economy and Finance
- Website: apsaraauthority.gov.kh

The Authority for the Protection of the Site and Management of the Region of Angkor, also called APSARA or the APSARA National Authority, is a Cambodian management authority responsible for protecting the Angkor Archaeological Park. Founded in 1995, it is in charge of the research, protection, and conservation as well as the urban and tourist development of the park. It is headquartered in Siem Reap. It consisted of eight departments and more than 3000 personnel.

APSARA National Authority is a Public Administration Organization under technical supervision of the Ministry of Culture and Fine Arts and under financial supervision of the Ministry of Economy and Finance.

== Board of directors ==
The Board of Directors of APSARA National Authority consists of nine members:

- Minister of Ministry of Culture and Fine Arts is the President of the Board of Directors
- Representative of the Ministry of Economy and Finance
- Representative of the Ministry of Interior
- Representative of the Ministry of Land Management, Urban Planning and Construction
- Representative of the Ministry of Tourism
- Representative of the Ministry of Environment
- Governor of Siem Reap
- Director General of APSARA National Authority
- Representative of Staffs of APSARA National Authority

== Departments ==
APSARA is headed by a Director General, four Deputy Directors General and there are eight departments:

- Department of Research, Training and Communication
- Department of Conservation of the Monuments and Preventive Archaeology
- Department of Tourism Development and Culture
- Department of Land Management, Urban Heritage and Community
- Department of Water, Forestry and Infrastructure Management
- Department of Administration and Personnel
- Department of Public Order
- Department of Finance and Accounting

=== Museums ===
There are three museums under the management of the Department of Tourism Development and Culture:

- Preah Norodom Sihanouk-Angkor Museum
- MGC Asian Traditional Textiles Museum
- Angkor Ceramic Museum at Tani

== See also ==
- Angkor National Museum
