= Madeleine Sharp =

British physician and peace campaigner

- Born: July 1920; London
- Died: 7 January 2014
- Education: University of Edinburgh
- Occupations: Medical doctor, general practitioner
- Awards: Member of the Order of the British Empire (2002 New Year Honours); Friendship Order

Madeleine Agnes Sharp MBE (July 1920 – 7 January 2014) was a British physician and peace campaigner. She was known for her work to provide medical and scientific aid to Vietnam and as a general practitioner in Coventry.

== Early life and education ==
Sharp was born in London and grew up in Newcastle upon Tyne. She also spent a lot of time in Gourock with her grandparents, where she acquired a Scottish accent. Sharp's mother was the secretary of the British-Soviet Friendship Society and encouraged Sharp's interest in politics; Sharp was called a "premature anti-fascist" by a teacher at her school due to her frequent discussions of the Spanish Civil War.

Sharp's mother also likely encouraged her to pursue a career in medicine. Sharp trained as a nurse initially because her parents could not afford to send her to medical school.

Sharp served in India under the Queen Alexandra's Royal Army Nursing Corps where she witnessed the beginnings of Partition, the horrors of which led to her later passionate anti-war campaigning.

After World War II, Sharp obtained a newly released National Health Service grant to study medicine at Edinburgh University.

== Career and campaigning ==
After qualifying, Sharp took a job as a locum at a general practice in Coventry, which then became a permanent role. She became a partner and later senior partner at the practice and worked there for 30 years.

Sharp actively protested US involvement in Vietnam and became involved in the Medical Aid Committee for Vietnam (later known as Medical and Scientific Aid to Vietnam, Laos and Cambodia or MSAVLC) in 1965. Sharp became honorary secretary in 1987 and continued in the role until 2009. Sharp was particularly involved in work to provide prostheses to those who had lost limbs due to land mines, in seeking to reduce infant mortality, and in investigating how traditional treatments could work alongside Western medicine.

Sharp was the chair of the City of Coventry Lord Mayor's Peace Committee and was responsible for attracting speakers including Ted Heath, Mo Mowlam and Harold Wilson to give the annual Peace Lecture.

== Awards and honours ==
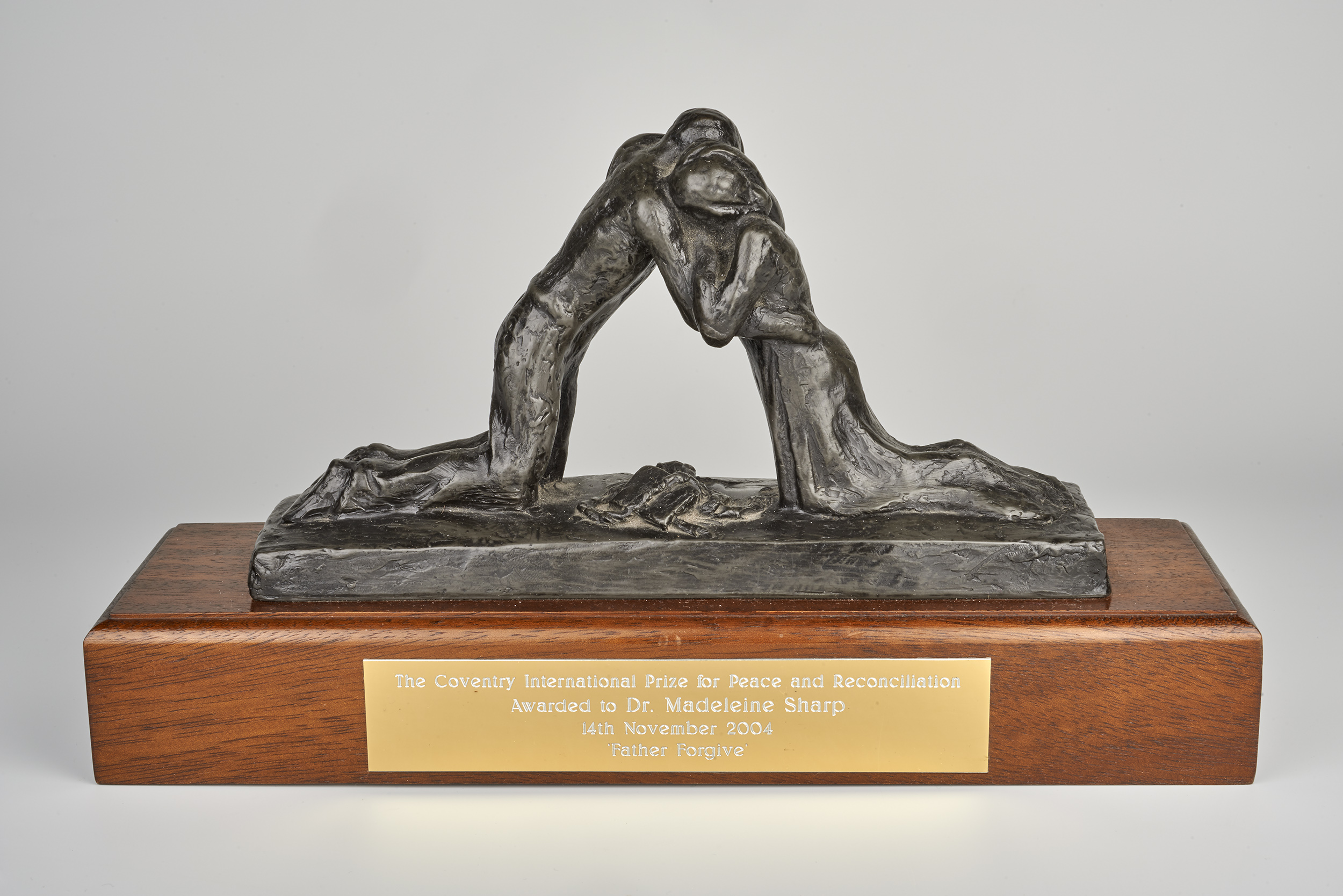
The Coventry International Prize for Peace and Reconciliation

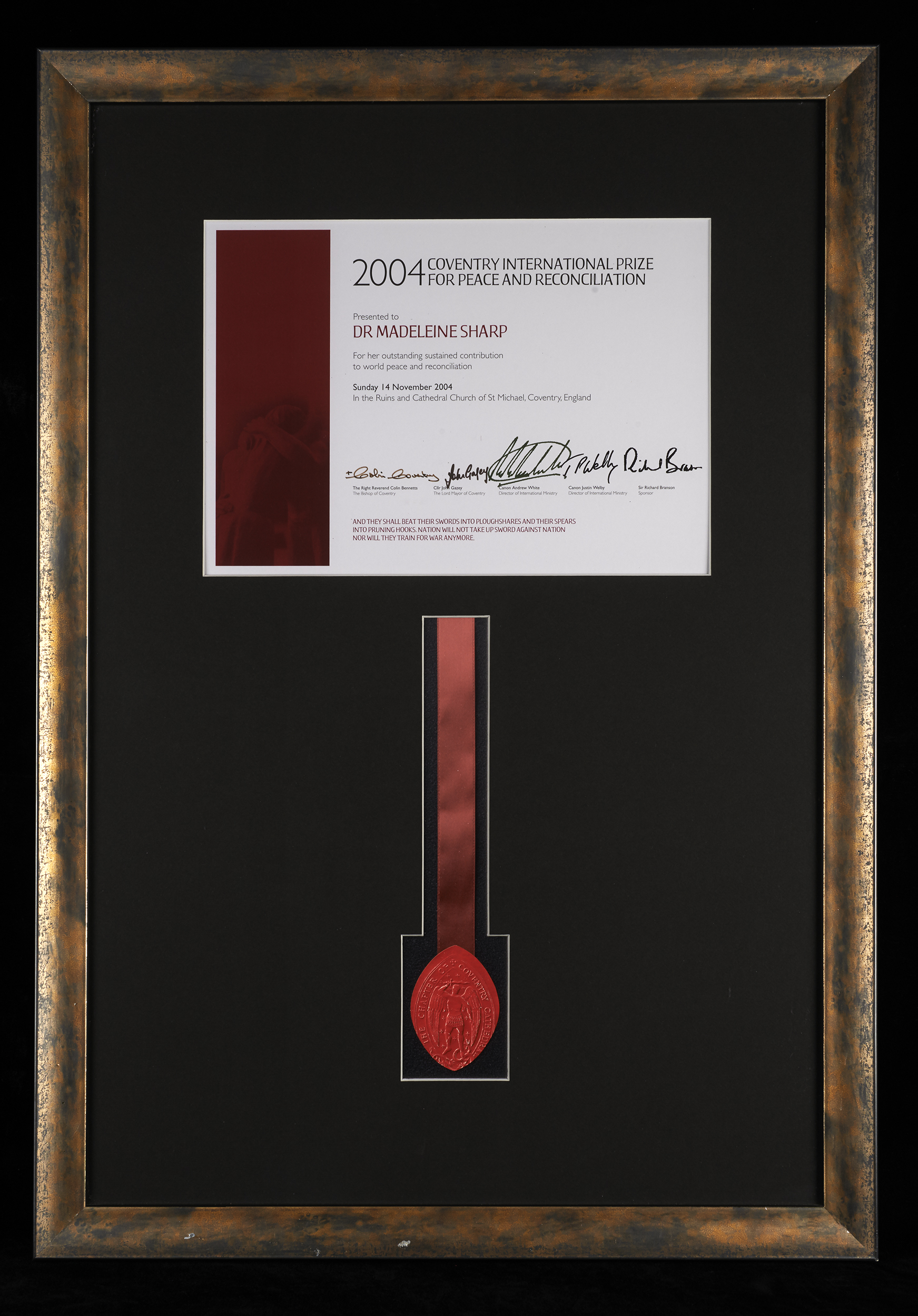
The Coventry International Prize for Peace and Reconciliation

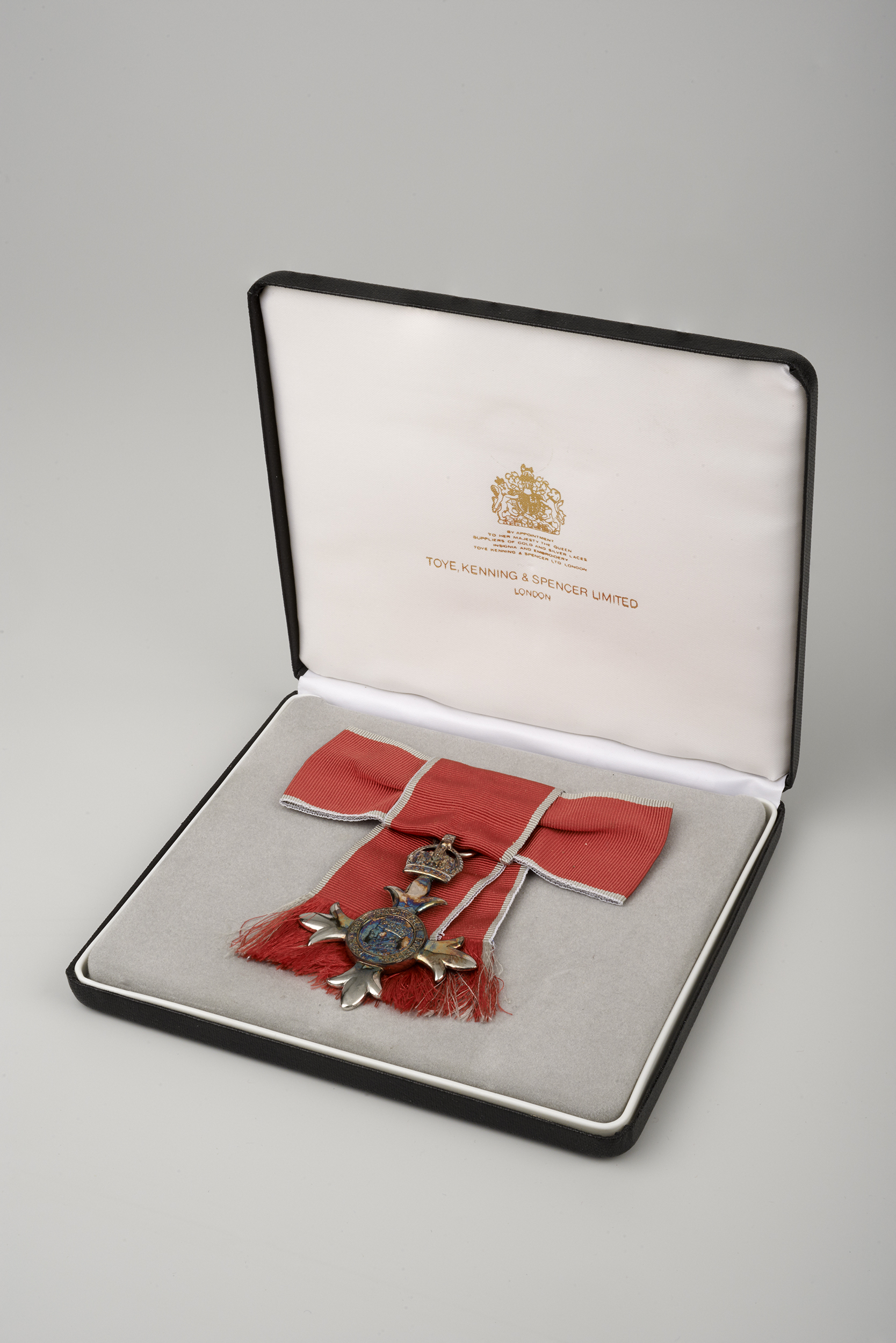
Sharp's MBE

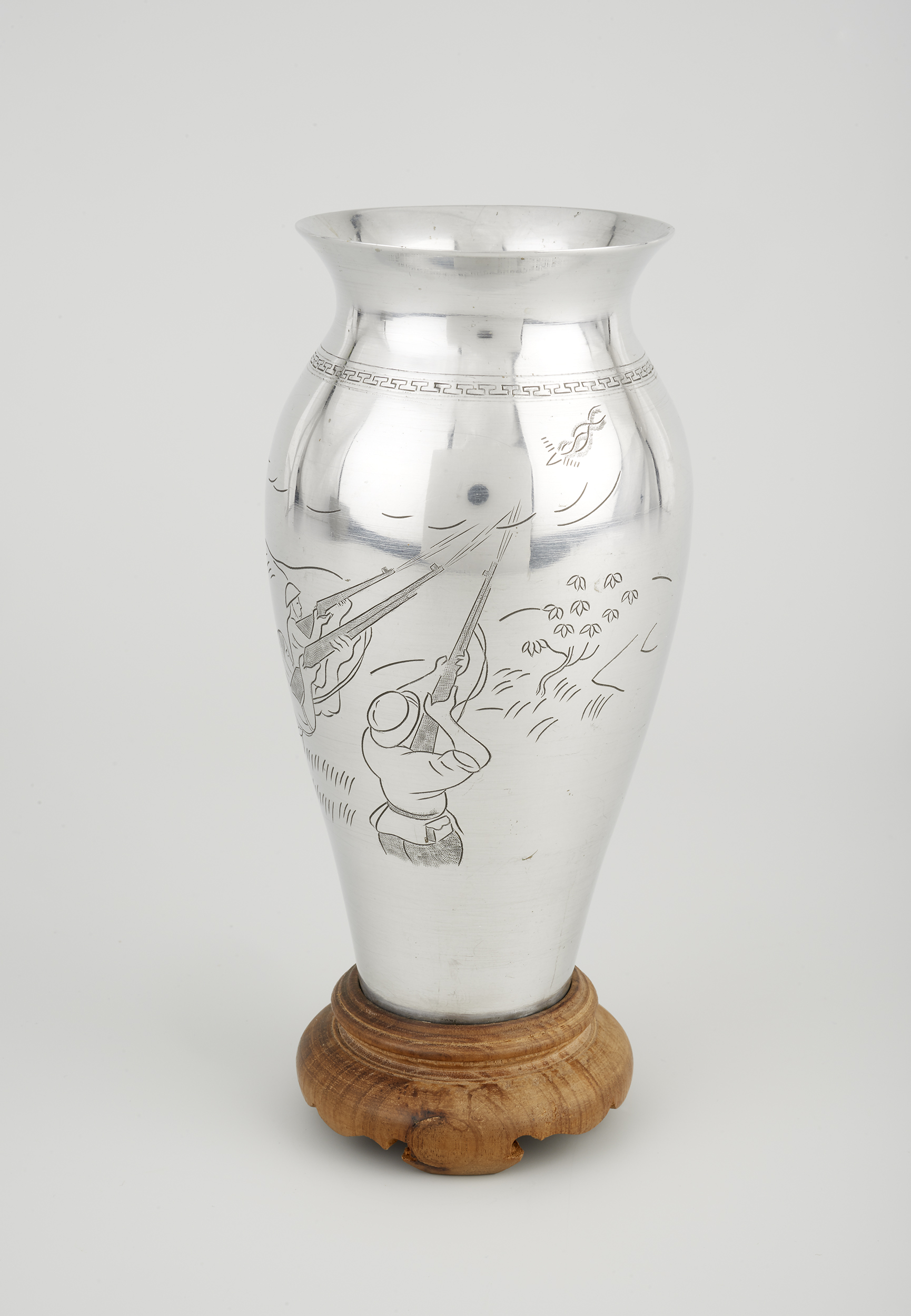
Vase presented by Nguyễn Thị Bình

Nguyễn Thị Bình presented Sharp with a vase made from an aircraft shot down during the Vietnam War in 1969, with the hope that it might hold flowers of peace in recognition of Sharp's anti-war campaigning. Sharp did not visit Vietnam until 1989 but subsequently made many trips. Her final trip was a three-week tour in 2009.

In 1992, the Vietnamese government awarded Sharp its Order of Friendship.

In 1995, Coventry University awarded her an Honorary degree.

Sharp was appointed a Member of the Order of the British Empire (MBE) in the 2002 New Year Honours for services to human rights and humanitarian causes in Vietnam, Laos and Cambodia.

In 2004, Sharp received the Coventry peace prize.

In 2013, the Vietnamese government awarded Sharp its Order of Merit.
