= Institute of Technology of Cambodia =

Higher education institution in Cambodia

- វិទ្យាស្ថានបច្ចេកវិទ្យាកម្ពុជា (Khmer); Institut de Technologie du Cambodge (French)
- Other names: ITC, Sala Techno
- Former name: Institut Technique Supérieur de l'Amitié Khméro-Soviétique
- Type: Public research
- Established: 20 September 1964; 61 years ago
- Affiliations: Agence universitaire de la Francophonie; Greater Mekong Sub-region Academic and Research Network
- President: Dr. Phoeurng Sackona
- Director General: Prof. Dr. Po Kimtho
- Faculty: 303
- Undergraduates: 5,844
- Postgraduates: 121
- Doctoral students: 51
- Location: P.O. Box 86, Russian Federation Blvd, Toul Kork District, Phnom Penh, Cambodia (main campus); 11.5706°N 104.8981°E
- Campus: Phnom Penh Kep Province Kampong Cham Province Tboung Khmum Province
- Language: Khmer, French, English
- Colours

The Institute of Technology of Cambodia (ITC; Khmer: វិទ្យាស្ថានបច្ចេកវិទ្យាកម្ពុជា; French: Institut de Technologie du Cambodge), known for short as Sala Techno (Khmer: សាលាតិចណូ; lit. 'Techno School'), is a higher education institution in Phnom Penh, Cambodia that trains students in science, technology and engineering. Enrollment is approximately 3,500 undergraduate students and 200 graduate students.

== History ==
The Institute was founded in 1964 as Institut Technique Supérieur de l'Amitié Khméro–Soviétique (ITSAKS; The Superior Technical Institute of Khmer–Soviet Friendship, Khmer: វិទ្យាស្ថានបច្ចេកទេសជាន់ខ្ពស់មិត្តភាពខ្មែរ-សូវៀត). It was funded by the Soviet Union from 1964 to 1975 and from 1980 to 1991. This support ended in 1991 with the dissolution of the Soviet Union.

In 1993, the Royal Government of Cambodia and the Government of France signed an agreement to develop the renovation of the institute which then took its present name, Institut de Technologie du Cambodge. From 1993 to 2004 the ITC was operated under the framework of French grant assistance (the French Ministry of Foreign Affairs and the French embassy) and was run by Cambodia's French-language Agency of Higher Education (AUF).

Since 1997, the ITC has benefited from significant financial and academic support from Belgium (via institutional university cooperation programs). These programs have enabled the purchase of new teaching equipment and provided support for the training of students, teachers, and researchers.

In 2017, its second campus was opened in Tboung Khmum Province.

== Education ==
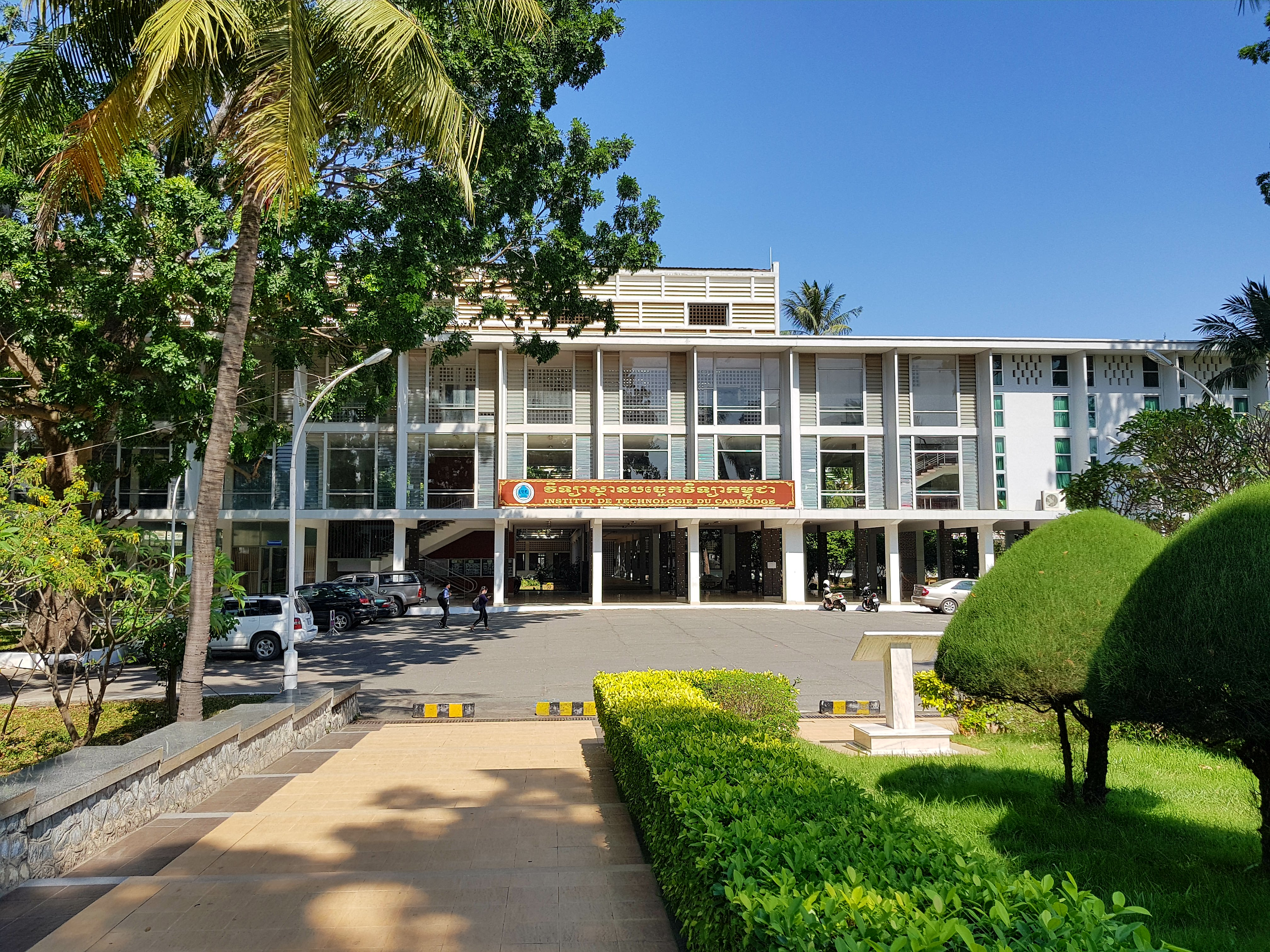
ITC viewed from the main entrance.

The Institute of Technology of Cambodia (ITC) is one of Cambodia's higher education institutions. It offers education and research programs in engineering. Programs are offered in French and English.

In the freshman undergraduate program, students complete a foundation year before choosing their majors in the engineering program.

As of June 2017, ITC had 263 lecturers and 3,729 undergraduate students. From the 2017–18 academic year, the number of students is 4,942.

=== Programmes ===
- Matriculation programme: 2 years
- I.Com: 2 years
- Bachelors programmes: 2 years
- Acting programmes: 3 years

Dual-degree programs can be applied for with some universities in Europe such as INSA Rennes and INP Toulouse.

== Organisation ==
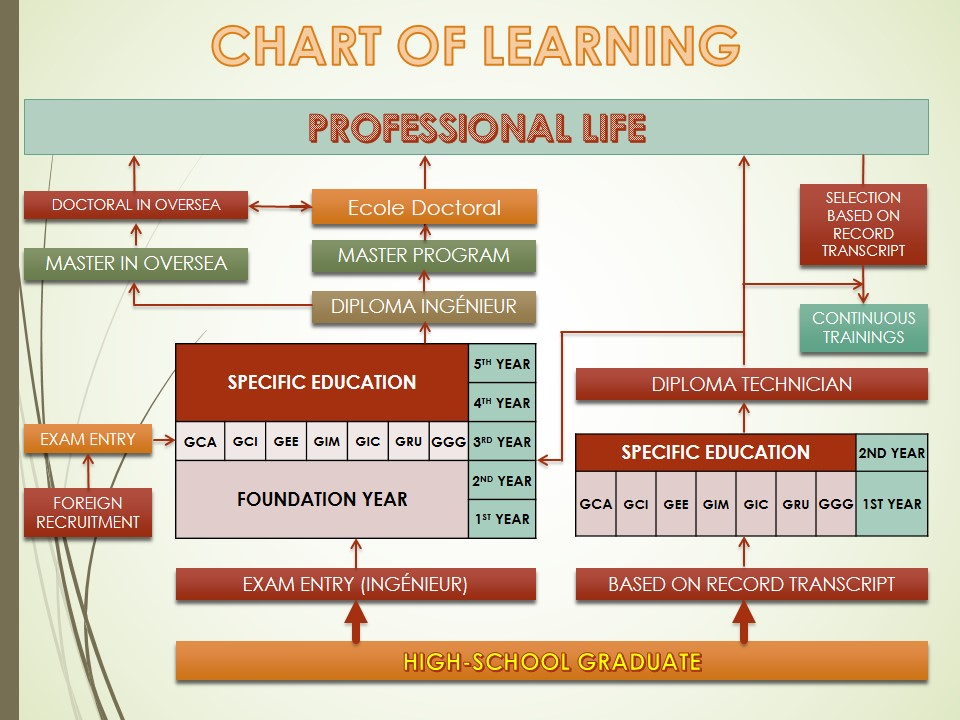
ITC chart of learning

ITC has five faculties in addition to its Foundation Year Department, French and English Sections, Research and Innovation Centre, Graduate School, and Centre for Multimedia and Cyber University (distance education).

=== Undergraduate ===
- Faculty of Applied Science
  - Department of Foundation Year
  - Department of Applied Mathematics and Statistics
- Faculty of Civil Engineering
  - Department of Civil Engineering
  - Department of Architectural Engineering
  - Department of Transport and Infrastructure Engineering
- Faculty of Chemical and Food Engineering
  - Department of Chemical Engineering
  - Department of Food Engineering
- Faculty of Electrical Engineering
  - Department of Electrical and Energy Engineering
  - Department of Industrial and Mechanical Engineering
  - Department of Telecommunications and Network Engineering
  - Department of Information and Communication Engineering
- Faculty of Hydrology and Water Resources Engineering
  - Department of Water Resources Engineering and Rural Infrastructure
  - Department of Water and Environmental Engineering
- Faculty of Geo-resources and Geotechnical Engineering

=== Graduate school ===
- Materials and Structural Engineering
- Computer Science
- Water and Environmental Engineering
- Agro-Industrial Engineering
- Energy Technology and Management
- Mechatronics, Information and Communication Engineering
- Transport Engineering
- Data Science

== Admissions ==
Each year, 1,000 high school students from across Cambodia are recruited by the entrance exam committee. The entrance exam is held in mid-October. Applicants must have passed high school exams and scored well in basic science to be admitted to ITC.

ITC accepts students for engineer's, bachelor's and master's degrees in fields of engineering with an emphasis on matriculating students through to graduate programs. Students should possess a grade point average (GPA) of not less than 2.5 together with a proficient score of French or English.

Fees vary from program to program, ranging between 2,400,000 and 81,526,000 ៛ per year. Scholarships are offered to students for financial need and for merit.

== Administration ==
The Board of Trustees (Khmer: ក្រុមប្រឹក្សាភិបាល, French: Conseil d'administration) of ITC was established in 1994 under French administration. The role of this board is to follow the progress of activities by the directors and to endorse the academic curriculum, new programs, and the budget and action plan proposed by the directors. This board has an annual meeting in mid-June. It is composed of members from stakeholders such as the Ministry of Education, Ministry of Finance, Ministry of Industry, French Embassy, Japanese Embassy, the consulate of Belgium, Japan International Cooperation Agency (JICA), a representative from the Board of Consortium, the Director of ITC, ITC alumni, and private-sector representatives.

Minister for Culture and Fine Arts Dr. Phoeurng Sackona serves as the president of the Board of Trustees.

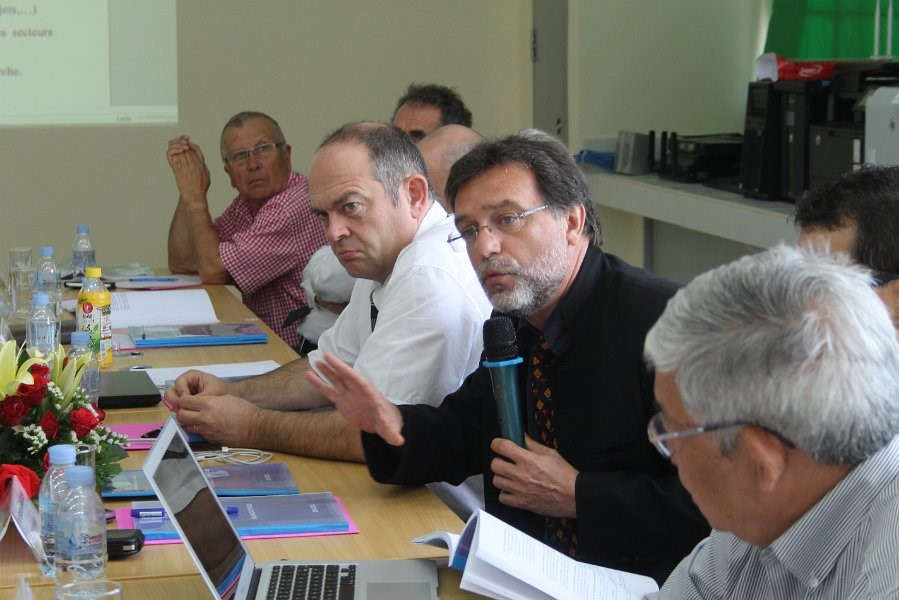
A board member's meeting of academic consortium of ITC, March 2016

The Academic Committee evaluates and endorses the curriculum to maintain the quality of education and to meet standards with international partners from universities in Europe and Asia, national organizations, and the private sector. This committee has a 5-year term and will be renewed until 2018. There are two groups of board members. Full members have voting rights while invited members can give suggestions and recommendations. This committee has 12 members from higher education institutions from France, 2 from Japan, 1 from Thailand, 2 from Belgium, 2 from private sectors and 1 from the Cambodian government.

== Research programs ==
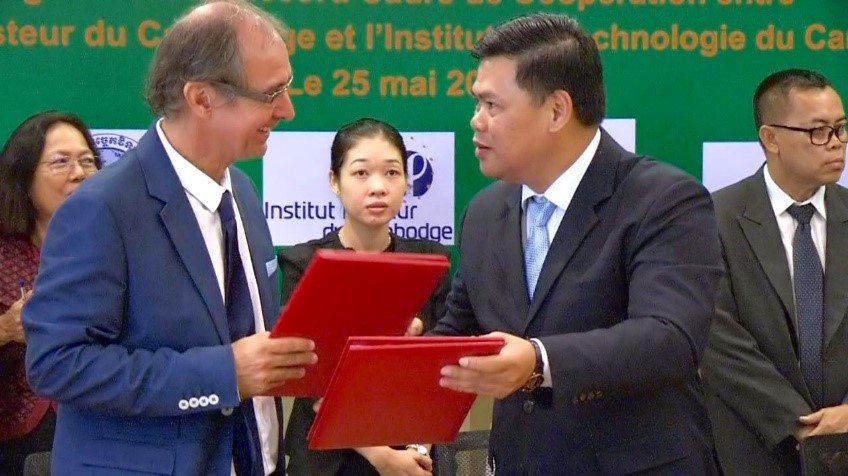
Exchanges agreement of joint research with Institut de Pasteur

During the last 5 years, 35 research projects were active each year. Around 50 researchers are permanently conducting research in different fields. Currently, ITC is pursuing a policy of strengthening its competitive research areas and supporting cutting-edge research, including prioritized research programs linked to urban management, waste water, hydrology, irrigation, food safety, air quality, new energy, urbanization, robots, and information and communications technology.

== Corporate relationships ==
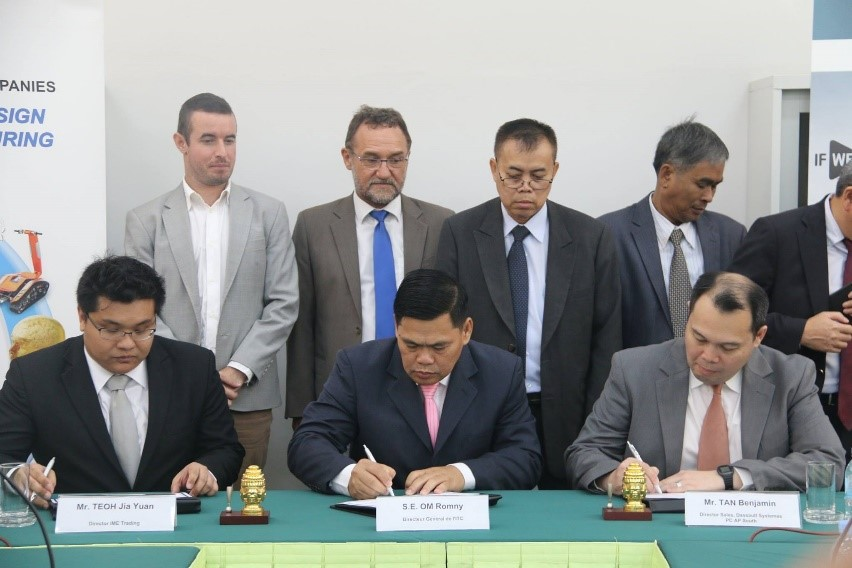
Under assistance of Dassault system for SolidWorks a three-party agreement with Singapore and Malaysia is signed

More than 80 higher education institutions from around the world have signed agreements with ITC. Most of the agreements are with colleges and universities in France, Belgium, Finland, Spain, Norway, Italy, Germany, Russia, Japan, Korea, China, and Association of Southeast Asian Nations (ASEAN) countries.

National and international companies, the private sector, and government agencies have partnerships with the ITC.

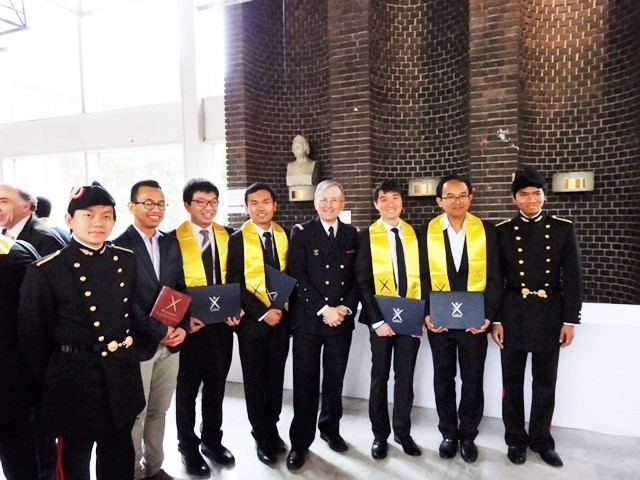
Ex-ITC students' graduated from École Polytechnique de Paris, France

École Polytechnique of Paris is among the stronger partners with ITC, and each year several ITC students have been recruited to study with them. In fiscal year 2015–16, ITC sent 86 students and staff to continue their graduate programs with university partners in other countries.

== Notable alumni ==
- Phoeurng Sackona, Minister of Culture and Fine Arts
- Veng Sakhon, Minister of Agriculture, Forestry and Fisheries

== ITC in the Social Media ==
- ITC website
- Telegram Channel ITC
- ITC Facebook
- Youtube Channel ITC
