= Cambodia–North Korea relations =

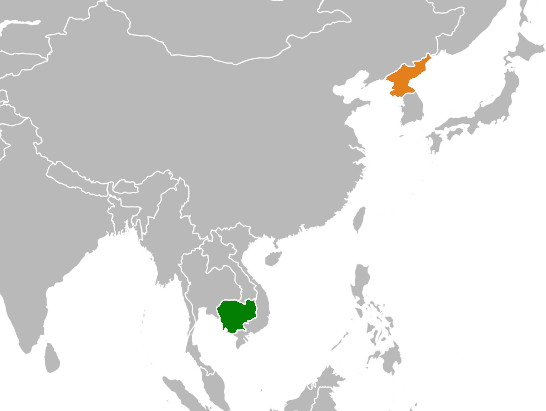

- Cambodia: North Korea

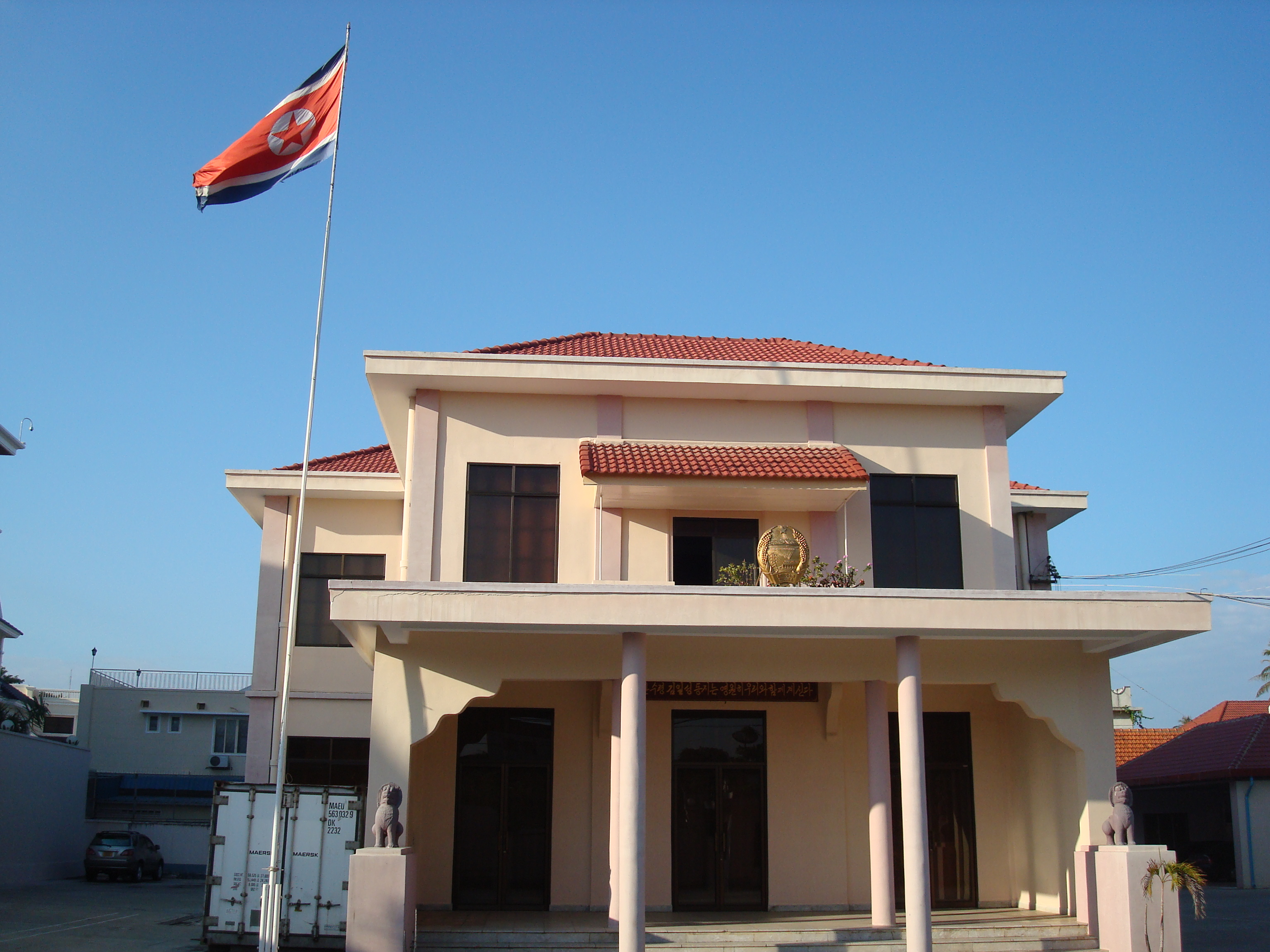
North Korean embassy in Phnom Penh

Cambodia–North Korea relations (Khmer: ទំនាក់ទំនងកម្ពុជា–កូរ៉េខាងជើង; Korean: 캄보쟈–조선민주주의인민공화국 관계) refers to the bilateral relationship between Cambodia and North Korea (DPRK). The DPRK has an embassy in Phnom Penh; Cambodia has an embassy in Pyongyang. The North Korean embassy is located on Sihanouk Boulevard, Phnom Penh, directly adjacent to the President of the Senate's (Hun Sen) residence.

== History ==
The relationship started in 1965 when Cambodia's Norodom Sihanouk met Kim Il Sung in Jakarta, Indonesia. After Sihanouk was toppled in 1970, the DPRK continued to support his government in exile. In 1974, the DPRK built a palace for Sihanouk near Pyongyang called Changsuwon Palace. When the Khmer Rouge was removed by a Vietnamese invasion in 1979, the DPRK supported Sihanouk in a new exile government as well as the Khmer Rouge against Vietnam. He regularly resided in the DPRK until 1991 when he became King of Cambodia. When he returned to Cambodia as King, he took a bodyguard of DPRK individuals.

Cambodia has been suggested as an intermediary between North Korea and South Korea. A DPRK trade delegation visited Cambodia in 2011.

== Trade ==
Cambodia and the DPRK have a small relationship in relation to trade. One major investment by the DPRK in Cambodia is the construction and management of the Angkor Panorama Museum in Siem Reap, which celebrates the ancient Angkor empire, with the DPRK receiving profits from the museum for the first decade and the second decade, profits would be split between Cambodia and North Korea.

The DPRK also has patriotic restaurants within the country, performances, and a strong diplomatic presence in the country.
