= Land mines in Cambodia =

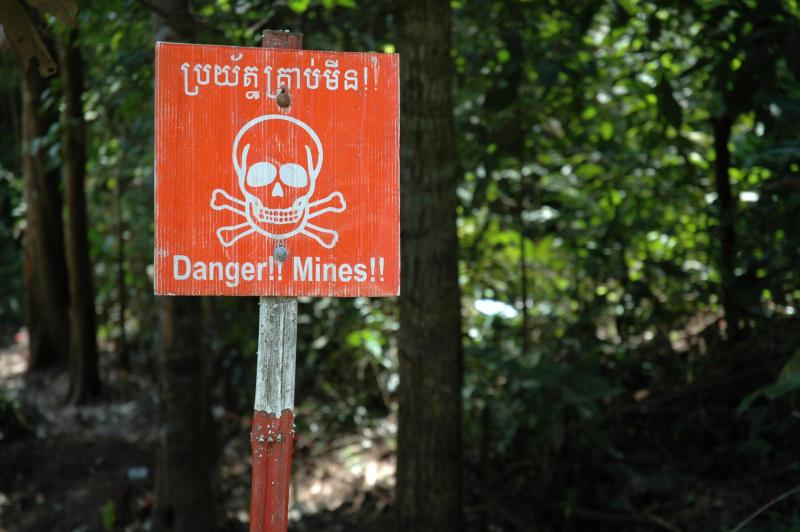
A landmine warning sign in Cambodia

Land mines in Cambodia are a major issue, especially in rural areas. Three decades of war resulted in 40,000+ amputees, some of the highest rates in the world. The Cambodian Mine Action Centre (CMAC) estimates that there may be as many as four to six million mines and other pieces of unexploded ordnance in Cambodia. Some estimates, however, run as high as ten million mines.

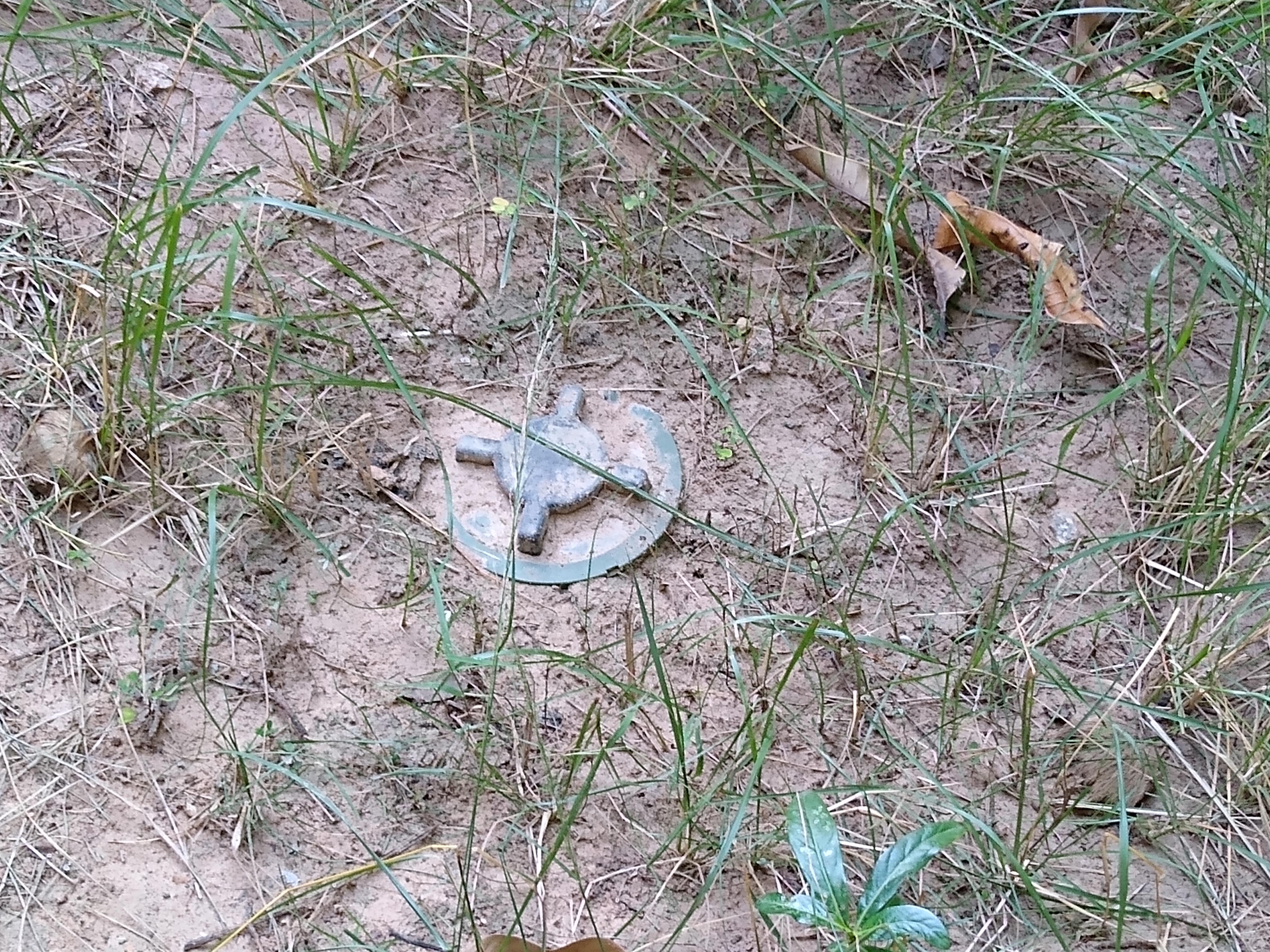
An anti-personnel mine on display at APOPO Visitor Center in Siem Reap

The Chinese-made land mines in Cambodia were placed by the Cambodian factions (including the Lon Nol, Khmer Rouge, the Heng Samrin and Hun Sen regimes, as well as the Coalition Government of Democratic Kampuchea who, with international support retained the UN seat throughout much of the 1980s) which clashed during the Civil War in Cambodia in the 1970s and 1980s. The Dangrek genocide in June 1979 was in great part due to civilian victims crossing over land mines placed along the border by Thai, Vietnamese and Khmer Rouge contingents. They were placed in the whole territory of the country. A common problem Cambodians faced with the anti-personnel mines is that even those who placed the mines didn't have maps or memory of their location.

While many mines were placed with the sole intent to harm humans, some were placed with the intent to protect an area. Many sacred temples were surrounded by land mines to protect them from looting, which used to be a major problem. The CMAC (Cambodia Mine Action Center) has cleared many of these areas and put up signs stating their work in previous minefields.

== Casualty rates ==
2010 casualty statistics from the Cambodian Mine Victim Information Service (CMVIS) show that Cambodia had one of the highest casualty rates in the world. As of November 2017 the number of casualties in 2013 was 111, consisting of 22 persons killed and 89 injured. One-third of the casualties have been children, and almost all of them are boys, with studies showing that men and boys tend to be more willing than women to play with or examine explosives. Of surviving landmine victims, 87% are males over 15 years old, with a mean age of 28 years. In Afghanistan, 73% are males between ages 16 to 50, and 20% of the victims are male children."

"ICRC statistics claim that only 25% of mine victims arrive at hospital within 6 hours of being injured with 15% having to travel for more than 3 days before they reach a hospital." During the first half of 2016, the number of people killed in landmine incidents nearly doubled, with 20 deaths compared to 11 for the same period in 2015, though injuries declined by almost half, from 55 to 29.

== Social consequences ==
The high numbers of victims of working age affecting entire families represent a considerable burden on families' capacity for raising income and educating their children. The social consequences of land mines which Cambodia experiences poses a considerable social and economic problem. It exposes the vulnerability of the health system and the lack of a support strategy. For a family with a very low income, to have a member lose a limb and no access to good health care, and no governmental aid makes the dangers of land mines a much heavier burden on the Cambodian community. "Landmines, just by their sheer number alone in a particular area, can influence the population's behaviour. This in turn may result in an overall deterioration of public health and other aspects of social wellbeing. Farmers with mines, or those who only "perceive" the presence of landmines on their land will not be able to cultivate the land. This will lead to food scarcity and eventually even malnutrition."

== Socioeconomic effects ==
The National Level One Survey in Cambodia conducted in 2002 found that 20% (2,776 out of 13,908) of all villages in Cambodia are still contaminated by minefields and/or cluster bomb areas with reported adverse socio-economic impacts on the community. These adverse impacts included restrictions on access to agricultural land, pasture land, forests, and water resources, with 102,778, 105,707, 172,878 and 84,588 families being affected respectively.

A 2004 Cambodia Socio Economic Survey (CSES) noted that households headed by someone with one or more reported disabilities have significantly less wealth than other households. Households headed by a person disabled by war or land mines live in poverty at levels almost three times higher than if the disability was due to other causes.

== Demining efforts ==
As of 2019, there are seven demining organizations working in Cambodia: The Cambodian Mine Action Center (CMAC), established by the Supreme National Council of Cambodia in 1992, the Royal Cambodian Armed Forces (RCAF), The HALO Trust, and the Mines Advisory Group (MAG). The Cambodian Mine Action Authority or Cambodian Mine Action and Victim Assistance Authority (CMAA) was established in late 2000 as a regulatory authority to coordinate all demining, and establish policies and procedures. Finding the location of the mines with no witness or map record is a very difficult task that needs very specific tools, and demands a lot of time, and trained staff, and therefore also a lot of investment. Currently, most of the remaining mines are frequently found in the fields. Nowadays identifying the areas with mines and clearing them is carried out in the North West of the country, where most of the remaining mines are found. APOPO, a Belgian non-governmental organization which uses rats to detect land mines also joined the demining efforts in 2014.

In 2003, CMAA estimated that the combined cost for demining operations, including technical assistance and in kind contributions for Cambodia were about $40 million per year. Experts estimated that Cambodia would need another 10 to 20 years to clear the mines if the current level of funding was maintained.

On the same year, landmine-detection dogs were deployed by the CMAC, with technical and financial assistance from the Norwegian People's Aid (NPA). These highly trained animals however are being infected with parasites including fleas, ticks, and mosquitoes which often lead to the dogs' death or early retirement, a problem both the government and private groups are trying to solve.

African giant pouched rats are being used to help in demining efforts. Since 2016, APOPO's hero rats have found roughly 500 anti-personnel mines and more than 350 unexploded bombs in Cambodia.

== See also ==
- Dangrek Incident
- Aki Ra
- Cambodian Self Help Demining
- APOPO
- Land mines in the Vietnam War
