= Cambodian Self Help Demining =

Cambodian Self Help Demining (CSHD) is a nonprofit NGO founded by Aki Ra in Cambodia. Its mission is to clear landmines and UXOs in 'low priority' villages throughout the Kingdom of Cambodia. Low priority villages are often villages in remote area with limited traffic and populated by poor farmers. Hence, they do not receive priority from mine clearance projects and are at times overlooked.

== Efforts and funding ==
Cambodian Self Help Demining (CSHD) is a nonprofit NGO founded by Aki Ra in Cambodia. Its mission is to clear landmines and UXOs in 'low priority' villages throughout the Kingdom of Cambodia. Low priority villages are often villages in remote area with limited traffic and populated by poor farmers. Hence, they do not receive priority from mine clearance projects and are at times overlooked. The development problems that Cambodia faces with regard to landmines are enormous. The CSHD helps to solve some of the problems, such as rural poverty, by giving people access to previously hazardous land that can be used for farming, houses and schools to improve their standard of living. In 2010, CSHD cleared seven villages, removed 150 mines and UXOs and put 4,695 people back on previously mine-contaminated land. They also helped to build and support two village schools and paid the teacher's salaries.

CSHD has set up a Landmine Relief Fund to support the demining process. The main aim of the Fund is to seek contributions from external organizations to finance maintenance of the demining team. It costs about US$9,000 per month to maintain a demining team in the field, with the deminers paid up to US$250 per month. In 2011, CSHD had only 1 demining team, comprising 18 deminers working in the field and 7 support staff. It has been a continuing challenge for CSHD to raise funds.

== Affiliates ==
Besides actively carrying out demining work in the field, Cambodian Self Help Demining also cares for the children living at the Landmine Museum Relief Center; a home to children who have been orphaned by landmines and have no one else to take care of them. Their mission is to provide education and support for children at risk. The provision of shelter and education for these children allows them to have a higher standard of living, with education providing employment opportunities in the future.

== See also ==
- Land mines in Cambodia
