= Kampong Thom Museum =

Museum in Kampong Thom City, Cambodia

- Established: March 31, 2011; 15 years ago
- Location: Kampong Thom City, Cambodia
- Coordinates: 12.727020°N 104.888553°E

The Kampong Thom Museum (Khmer: សារមន្ទីរ ខេត្តកំពង់ធំ) is a museum located in Kampong Thom City, Cambodia. The museum is dedicated to displaying artifacts from the Kampong Thom Province.

== History ==
The construction of the museum began in 2008 and was inaugurated by the Ministry of Cultures and Fine Arts in 2011. In September 2020, the Japanese ambassador Mikami visited the museum with the aim of creating a project for the conservation of Cambodia's heritage in collaboration with the Ministry of Culture and Fine Arts.

== Collections ==
The museum consists of a room and a small gallery. The museum contains a collection of wooden and stone statues of Buddha, Vishnu, Lokesvara and lions. The museum contains artifacts from Sambor Prei Kuk. The museum also has a collection of lintels from the pre-Angkor period. The museum building is built in a traditional Cambodian architectural style and contains about 150 pieces of art, dating from the pre-Angkorian, Angkorian and post-Angkorian periods.
