= Angkor Borei Museum =

Museum in Angkor Borei, Cambodia

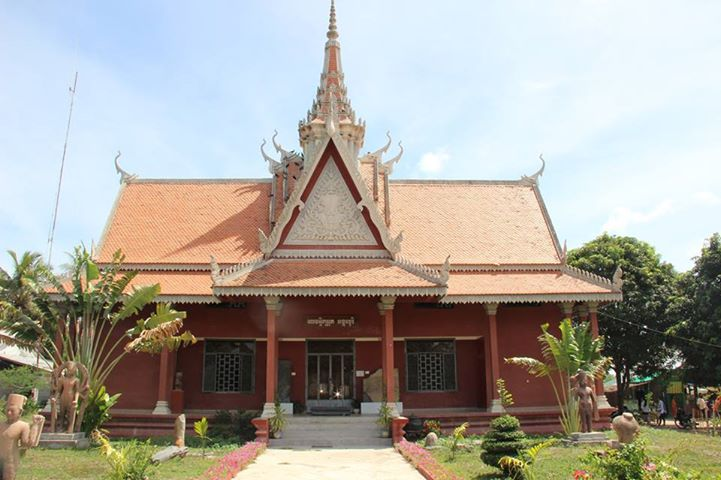
- Established: May 5, 1999; 27 years ago
- Location: Angkor Borei, Cambodia
- Coordinates: 10.9942°N 104.9778°E

The Angkor Borei Museum (Khmer: សារមន្ទីរស្រុកអង្គរបុរី) is a museum located in Angkor Borei, Cambodia. The museum is dedicated to preserving historical artifacts of Cambodian civilization.

== History ==
The museum is located in a wat. The museum was funded with the help of the European Union, one of the objectives for the creation of the museum was to preserve the archaeological artifacts found in Cambodia. Also one of the intentions for the creation of the museum was to promote tourism in Takéo Province. The museum first opened to the public in 1999, at its inauguration representatives of the Ministry of Culture and Fine Arts, the Ministry of Tourism, the European Union, the University of Hawaii and PRASAC were present. In March 2020, the U.S. government gave $4.5 million to protect Cambodia's cultural heritage, the funds were used by the Ministry of Culture and Fine Arts to improve the Angkor Borei museum exhibits as well as the creation of educational programs at the museum. In September 2020, the Cleveland Museum of Art organized an exhibition called "Revealing Krishna", some of the statues were loaned by the Angkor Borei Museum.

== Collections ==
The museum has exhibits that include jewelry, pottery, archaeological remains, and stone carvings. The museum contains artifacts made of stone, clay, and copper. The museum also contains artifacts from the Funan period and the Chenla period. The museum has a collection of sculptures of Vishnu and Shiva, as well as a collection of ceramics. The museum artifacts include Neolithic objects from Cambodia as well as objects from archaeological excavations that are 2,500 years old. The museum exhibits include Buddhist and Hindu statues, utensils, pottery, inscriptions, jewelry, as well as fossils dating from the Angkorian to the post-Angkorian period.

== Gallery ==
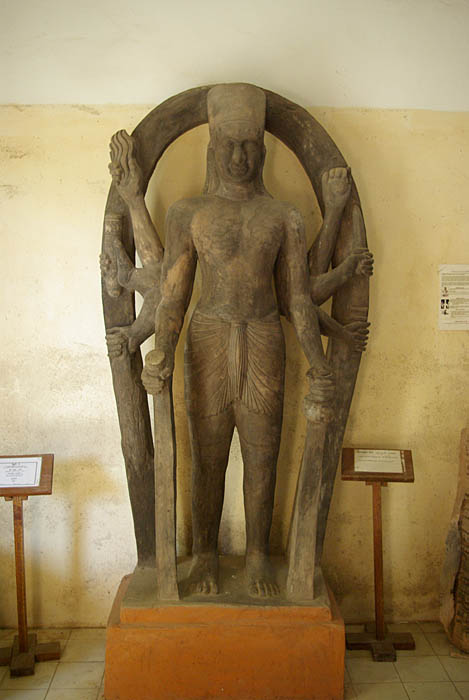
One of the statues in the museum
