= Phoeurng Sackona =

Cambodian politician

Her Excellency Phoeurng Sackona
- ភឿង សកុណា
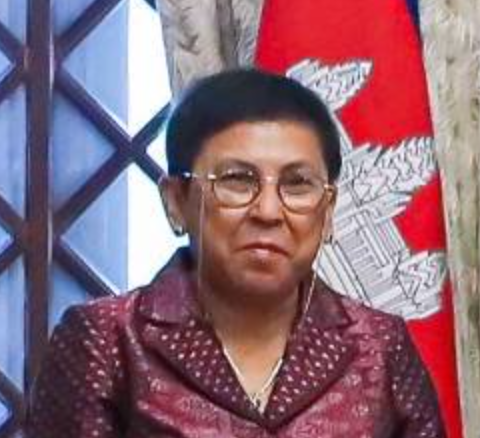
- Sackona in Manila in 2025

Minister of Culture and Fine Arts
- Incumbent
- Assumed office 24 September 2013
- Prime Minister: Hun Sen; Hun Manet

President of Institute of Technology of Cambodia
- In office 2008–?

Personal details
- Born: 8 October 1959 (age 66) Pursat, Cambodia
- Party: Cambodian People's Party
- Children: Chheng Nipoan
- Education: Institute of Technology of Cambodia; Gubkin Russian State University of Oil and Gas; ENSBANA; University of Burgundy
- Profession: Academic; engineer; politician
- Website: Government website

Phoeurng Sackona (Khmer: ភឿង សកុណា, Phœăng Sâkŏna [pʰɨəŋ sakonaː]; born 8 October 1959) is a Cambodian academic, engineer and politician who is the current Minister of Culture and Fine Arts. She is a member of the Cambodian People's Party. She also serves as the President of the Board of Trustees of the Institute of Technology of Cambodia. She is also the daughter-in-law of former Minister of Culture Chheng Phon.

== Academic achievements ==
- 2002: Doctorate in Food Sciences, Microbiology, University of Burgundy
- 1998: DEA of Microbiology, École Nationale Supérieure de Biologie Appliquée à la Nutrition de l'Alimentation, University of Burgundy
- 1987: Master's degree, engineering science, Gubkhine Institute in Moscow, USSR
- 1986: Engineer's degree, chemical engineering, Institut de Technologie du Cambodge
- 1981: High School Diploma, Phnom Penh, Cambodia

== Political career ==
- 2013–: Minister of Culture and Fine Arts
- 2008–: President of the Board of Directors, Institut de Technologie du Cambodge
- 2008–2013: Secretary of State for Ministry of Education, Youth and Sport
- 2003–2008: Director-General, Institut de Technologie du Cambodge
- 2000–2003: Deputy Director-General, Institut de Technologie du Cambodge
- 1994–2000: Dean, Faculty of Chemical Engineering, Institut de Technologie du Cambodge
- 1991–1994: Lecturer, Institut de Technologie du Cambodge
- 1987–1991: Staff, Ministry of Industry
