= Land mines in the Vietnam War =

Since the outbreak of the First Indochina War in 1946 and later the bloodier Second Indochina War of the 1960s and 1970s, countless numbers of land mines have been planted in what is now the Socialist Republic of Vietnam. Many of these devices that did not detonate at some point or another remain a very dangerous menace that continues plaguing the country and surrounding areas.

== Ordnance and use of mines ==
=== French mines ===
The French made limited use of mines in the beginnings of the independence war in Indochina.

=== American and South Vietnamese mines ===
The M14 mine blast-type anti-personnel mine used by the United States during the Vietnam War was known as the "toe popper." Earlier examples of the toe-popper were the Soviet-made PMK-40 and the World War II "ointment box." The United States also used the M16 mine, a copy of the German "Bouncing Betty".

=== North Vietnamese mines ===
The North Vietnamese forces made extensive use of a variety of homemade booby traps including the old French trou de loup set with Bengali punji sticks.

The North Vietnamese termed the smaller mines đạp lôi (đạp lôi "step-mine") or mìn muỗi (mìn muỗi "mosquito mine"). Their equivalent of the American toe popper was a cartridge trap made from an empty .50 caliber machine gun shell filled with gunpowder or other explosive powder and scrap metal. The casing is sealed in wax and placed in a bamboo cylinder with a nail in the bottom, which is then buried in the ground so only the wax on top is showing. When a person steps on the wax top the casing is pressed in to the nail which then blows scrap metal into the soldier's foot. Dap loi is rarely fatal but can blow a toe off and causes very painful wounds. Its most prevalent use was during the Vietnam War by Vietcong guerrillas attempting to find simple methods to slow the advancing U.S. forces down. The MD-82 mine was a Vietnamese copy of the M-14 "toe popper."

== Casualties ==
=== Vietnamese ===
American landmines caused extensive casualties and amputees within among the Vietnamese civilian population.

=== American ===
Landmines were a leading cause of American casualties. In 1965 alone, 65–70% of US Marine Corps casualties were caused by mines and booby-traps.

== After the war ==
After the Fall of Saigon in April 1975 and the end of the Vietnam War, the Vietnamese government was left with the legacy of both Vietnamese and American mines. The US government has recently given some financial assistance for humanitarian mine action.

== See also ==
- Land mines in Cambodia
- Mine clearance agency
