= Aki Ra =

Cambodian former child soldier, deminer, and museum curator (born c. 1970)

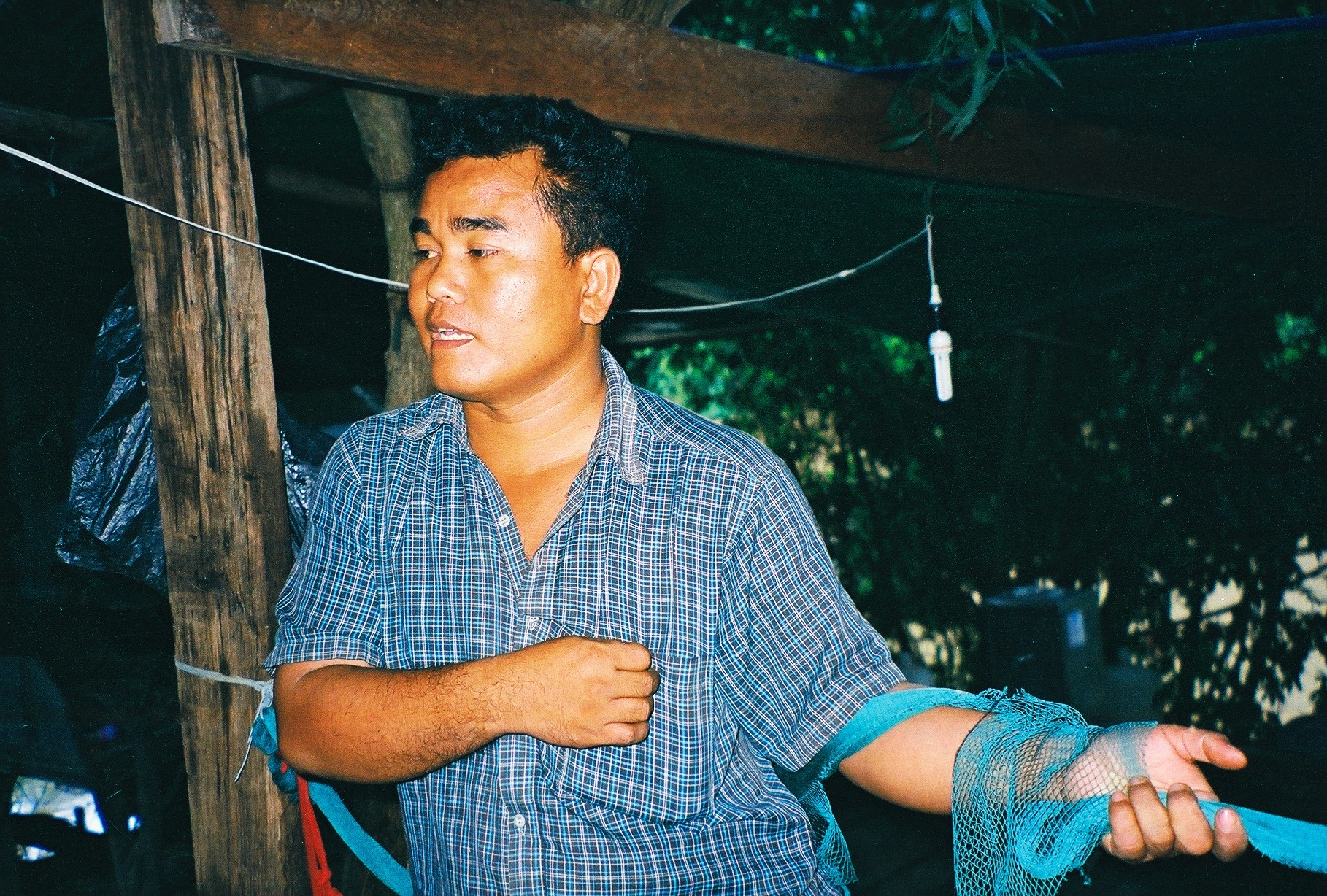
- Aki Ra in 2006
- Born: Eoun Yeak unknown (c. 1970); Siem Reap, Khmer Republic
- Occupations: Landmine campaigner, museum curator, director of all-Khmer de-mining NGO
- Spouse: Hourt (died 2009)
- Children: 3

Aki Ra (sometimes written Akira, born c. 1970) is a former Khmer Rouge conscripted child soldier who works as a deminer and museum curator in Siem Reap, Cambodia. He has devoted his life to removing landmines in Cambodia and to caring for young landmine victims. Aki Ra states that since 1992 he has personally removed and destroyed as many as 50,000 landmines, and is the founder of the Cambodian Landmine Museum.

== Early life ==
Aki Ra is unsure of his age, but believes he was born in 1970 or 1973. His parents were killed by the Khmer Rouge. Orphaned in a Khmer Rouge camp, he was taken in by a woman named Yourn who raised him and several other orphaned children. Like many others, he soon became a child soldier once his strength became sufficient to make him useful to local Khmer Rouge military commanders. When the Vietnamese army invaded Cambodia with the intention of toppling the Khmer Rouge political regime, he was taken into the custody of Vietnamese soldiers. Later he enlisted with the Kampuchean People's Revolutionary Armed Forces formed by the new government, the People's Republic of Kampuchea. His duties included placing landmines along the mined area on Cambodia's border with Thailand. The name "Aki Ra" was given to him by a Japanese acquaintance and is not his birth name. He was born Eoun Yeak, but one of his supervisors once compared his efficiency to AKIRA, a heavy-duty appliance company in Japan.

== Landmine clearing ==
Having laid thousands of landmines as a soldier, Aki Ra found employment as a deminer with the UN in 1991. After leaving UNMAS in 1992, he continued disarming and removing mines in his community. Having no demining tools, he used a knife, a hoe, a Leatherman and a stick. He would defuse the landmines and UXOs (unexploded ordnance) he found in small villages and bring home the empty casings. Sometimes he would sell them as scrap to help fund his work.

Tourists began hearing stories about a young Khmer man who cleared landmines with a stick and had a house full of defused ordnance. in 1999 Aki Ra began charging a dollar to see his collection, using the money to help further his activities. Thus began the Cambodian Landmine Museum.

Aki Ra cleared landmines where he had fought, when he heard about an accident, or when village chiefs and farmers would call him at the museum and tell him of mines in their villages and ask for his help. He conducted informal mine risk education groups to teach people about the dangers of unexploded ordnance and landmines.

== Adopted children ==
While working in these villages he found many injured and abandoned children. He brought them home to live with him and his wife Hourt. Some of the children who moved to their home were also street kids from Siem Reap and Phnom Penh. Eventually he brought home over two dozen boys and girls.

In early 2009, a boy came to live with Aki Ra and Hourt who had lost an arm and most of a hand to a cluster munition. He was working with his uncle in a field near Battambang, west of Siem Reap when he found an explosive probably left over from the Cambodian Civil War. Aki Ra found him in the hospital and told his family about the museum. He now lives there and attends school. Today, 29 children live at the Cambodia Landmine Museum Relief Center. In the past they were mainly landmine victims, but now they also include children born without limbs, polio victims, and some with HIV; some are orphans and some have parents who cannot afford to raise them. Funds from the museum are entirely dedicated to the support of these children to feed them, clothe them, and send them to school.

== Cambodian Landmine Museum ==
Cambodian government authorities soon tried to close down the museum, and Aki Ra was required to cease his "uncertified" demining activities after being briefly imprisoned in 2001 and again in 2006. In 2005 he went to London where he was trained on ordnance disposal from the International School of Security and Explosives Education. In 2008 with the help of Landmine Relief Fund, an American charity, and the Vietnam Veterans Mine Clearing Team – Cambodia, an Australian veterans group, he obtained full certification as a deminer and established a new NGO, Cambodian Self Help Demining (CSHD). It is certified by the Cambodian Mine Action Authority which also regularly inspects ordnance displayed in the museum. The Landmine Relief Fund has had a representative in the country working with CSHD. Generous support has also been provided by film producer Richard Fitoussi and film director Tom Shadyac.

The Landmine Museum was relocated and reopened in 2008.

CSHD's charter is to clear small villages, areas considered "low priority" for other international demining organizations, who are busy in "high priority" areas. In its first year of activity CSHD cleared 163,000 square meters of land and put over 2,400 people back on land that had been too dangerous to farm or live on. CSHD did this for an average cost of US$4,314 per month.

CSHD is funded primarily by its American and Australian partners, the Landmine Relief Fund and the Vietnam Veterans Mine Clearing Team – Cambodia. In 2009 the United States Department of State, Office of Weapons Removal and Abatement granted the Landmine Relief Fund US$100,000 to help CSHD in their work to clear ERW (explosive remnants of war) in "low priority villages" in Cambodia. Ongoing funding is uncertain as CSHD must compete with larger demining NGOs such as Mines Advisory Group and Halo Trust.

In 2024 December Akira left CSHD and started an all Cambodian organization with independent license for landmine and explosive clearance, risk education for explosives and ordinances . He does not have any institutional or government funding and solely relies on ticket sales and individual donations to fund these activities. Cambodia Landmine Museum has been awarded the travellers choice in 2026 by Tripadvisor .

== Recognition ==
In 2005 the book Children and the Akira Landmines Museum was published in Japanese, listing Aki Ra as the principal author.

In 2006, Mitsurin Shōnen ~Jungle Boy~ manga by Akira Fukaya was published. The manga not only reports Aki Ra's story, but also the meetings the author had with Aki Ra. A second tome has been published in 2007 and a French translation, Enfant Soldat, has been published in 2009 by Éditions Delcourt.

The documentary film A Perfect Soldier, describing Aki Ra's life, was released in 2010.

In July 2010 Aki Ra was selected as a CNN Hero. In September he was chosen as a Top 10 CNN Hero for 2010.

On 12 August 2012 Aki Ra was honored by the Manhae Foundation in South Korea with the 2012 Manhae Foundation Grand Prize for Peace. In February 2013 Aki Ra received the Paul P. Harris Fellowship for peace and conflict resolution from the Rotary Club of Gravenhurst, Ontario.

The award winning documentary film My Husband the Child Soldier, chronicling Aki Ra's early life and marriage was released in 2025.

== Personal life ==
The documentary film A Perfect Soldier implies that Aki Ra has suffered psychological problems, including depression, mood swings, nightmares and anxiety, as a result of his traumatic experiences as a soldier.

Several sources state that Aki Ra has had health problems due to his chronic, repeated exposure to explosive chemicals such as TNT and RDX.

In August 2018 Aki Ra was arrested for keeping defused, inert munitions on display at the Cambodian Landmine Museum. He was accused of lacking permits to display the munitions. The museum was closed for three months, but has since reopened.

== See also ==
- Cambodian Self Help Demining
- Cambodian Landmine Museum
