= Cambodian Landmine Museum =

Museum in Siem Reap, Cambodia

Coordinates: 13.5395°N 103.9457°E

The Cambodia Landmine Museum is a museum in Siem Reap in Cambodia . It's not just a museum but an educational center that generates revenue to directly fund Landmine clearance in Cambodia. It also uses the funds to educate the kids and villagers to identify landmines and explosives and safely avoid any contact. Founded by a Cambodian humanitarian deminer Aki Ra the museum documents of one of the most inspiring true stories of hope and transformation. A story of himself as a child who was forced to plant landmines and kill and how he chose the path to remove more landmines than he had planted and made his life's mission to make Cambodia landmine and explosives free.

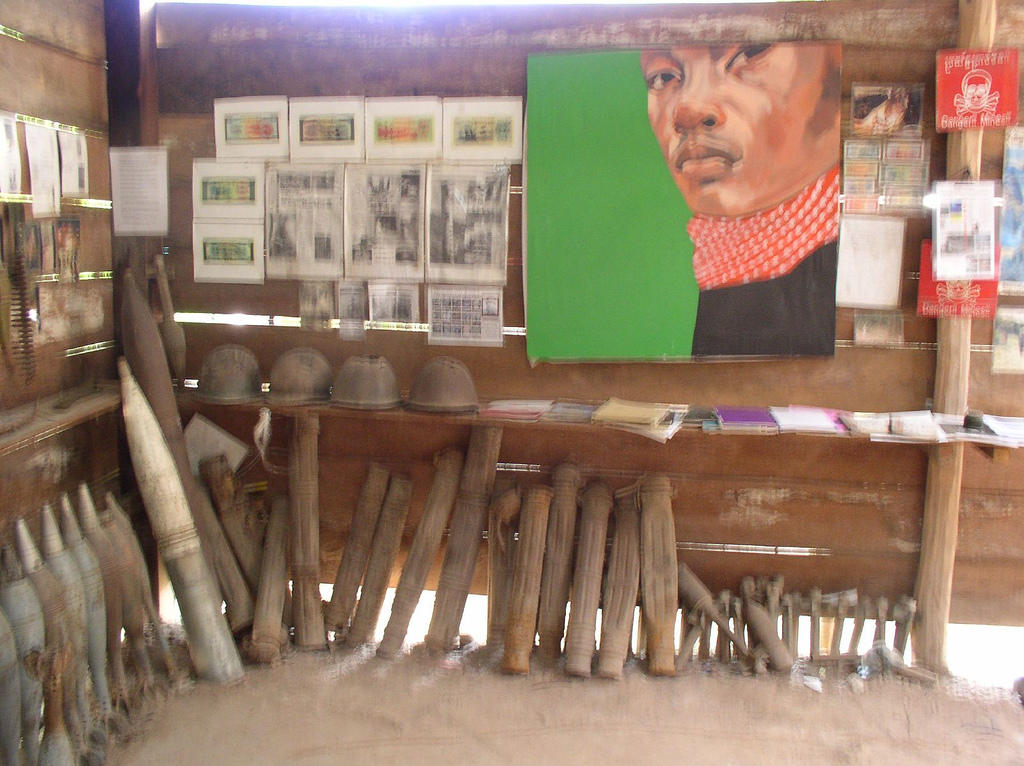
Cambodian Landmine museum

Unlike traditional military museums, the Cambodia Landmine Museum focuses on the human consequences of war, combining historical exhibitions with peace education, mine risk education, and public awareness. Its collection consists primarily of deactivated landmines, unexploded ordnance, weapons, military artefacts, and personal items recovered from former battlefields and minefields across Cambodia.

The museum is operated by the Cambodia Landmine Museum Relief Fund, a Cambodian non governmental organization that supports educational programmes, community outreach, and humanitarian activities related to landmine awareness and explosive remnants of war.

Located approximately 25 kilometers north east of Siem Reap and only a short distance from Banteay Srei, the museum is visited by domestic and international tourists, school groups, researchers, humanitarian organizations, journalists, and university students seeking to better understand Cambodia's modern history and the continuing global challenge posed by landmines and unexploded ordnance.

The museum and its founder have been featured in international news reports, documentaries, books, and television programs examining humanitarian demining and Cambodia's recovery following decades of armed conflict.

== History ==
Tourists began hearing stories about a young Khmer man, Aki Ra, who cleared landmines with a stick and had a house full of defused ordnance. Aki Ra began charging a dollar to see his collection, using the money to help further his activities. Thus began the Cambodia Landmine Museum.

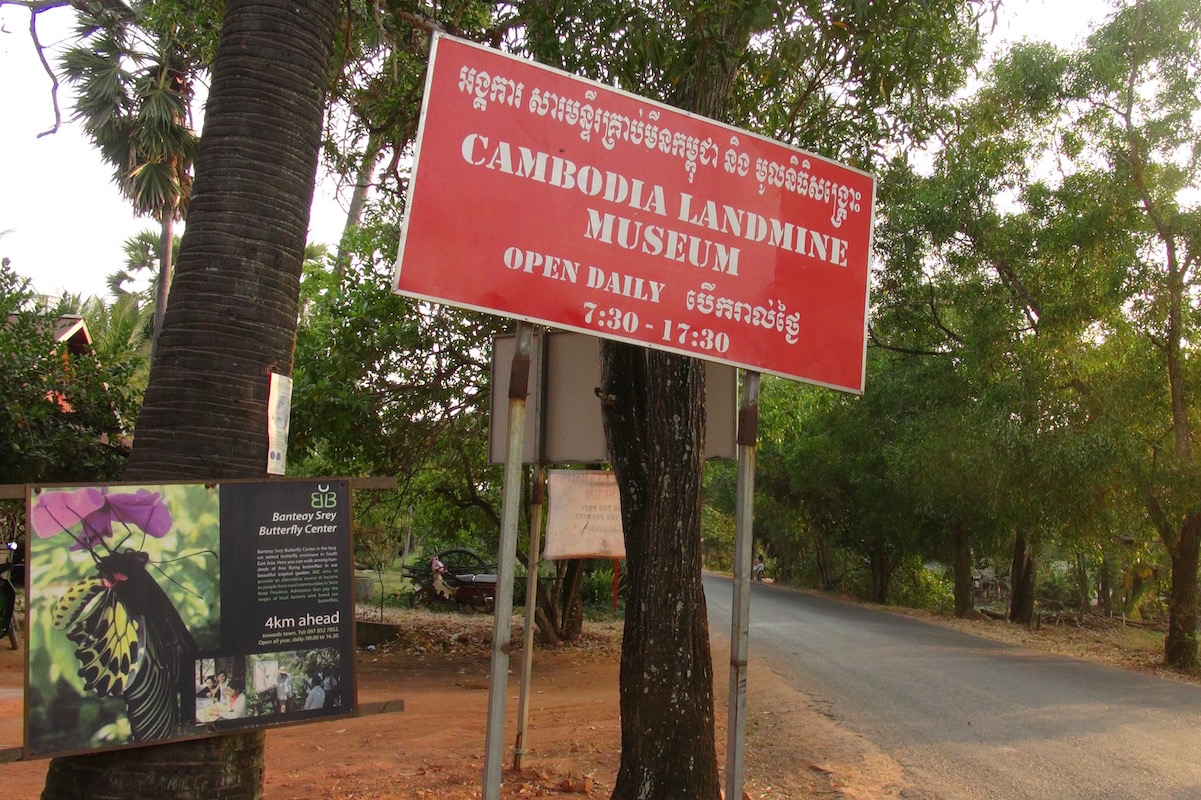

In 2007 the Cambodian government ordered Aki Ra’s museum closed. He was allowed to move it to a new location 25 kilometers from Siem Reap, near Banteay Srey Temple.

The Cambodia Landmine Museum exists for 3 reasons:

- To tell Aki Ra’s story that one person without any schooling or money in his pocket can make an impact to the world.
- To tell the world about the horrors of landmines and explain that war is only half the problem. The aftermath of war continues long after the shooting stops.
- To care for the children who live at the museum and in areas that are still contaminated with landmines and explosives.

== The MUSEUM ==
The museum consists of indoor and outdoor exhibition areas that document Cambodia's experience with landmines and explosive remnants of war.

The permanent collection includes anti personnel landmines, anti tank mines, cluster munition remnants, artillery shells, mortar rounds, rockets, grenades, aircraft bombs, military equipment, and demining tools. Many exhibits were recovered during humanitarian clearance operations in northwestern Cambodia and are accompanied by explanatory text describing their origin, design, and humanitarian impact.

Exhibitions combine historical interpretation with personal stories from deminers, survivors, and affected communities. Rather than presenting weapons solely as military artefacts, displays emphasize their continuing impact on civilian populations, agriculture, education, and economic recovery.

The museum also includes photographic displays, historical documents, maps, and educational materials explaining Cambodia's armed conflicts, the development of humanitarian mine action, and international efforts to eliminate landmines.

== Aki Ra 's achievements ==
Aki Ra has cleared over 50,000 landmines and explosive which includes more than 22,000 anti personnel mines, over 4000 anti tank mines, close to 30,000 unexploded ordnance, and hundreds of US , Soviet bombs. He had also adopted close to 100 children
