= Angkor Panorama Museum =

Art and history museum in Siem Reap, Cambodia

- Established: December 5, 2015; 9 years ago
- Location: Siem Reap, Cambodia
- Coordinates: 13.377594°N 103.8806495°E
- Type: Art & History Museum

The Angkor Panorama Museum (Khmer: សារៈមន្ទីរសព្វទស្សន៍អង្គរ) is a museum in Siem Reap, Cambodia. The museum is dedicated to show the history of ancient temples in Cambodia.

== History ==
The museum was built by a North Korean company Mansudae Art Studio with the participation of the APSARA Authority. The construction of the museum began in 2011, the Mansudae studio designed the structure, in which the studio consulted a committee of government officials from Cambodia. The North Korean government invested US$24 million in the museum. The museum was inaugurated in December 2015. One of the North Koreans who worked on the museum is Kim Je Jung, who also made a military sculpture for the António Agostinho Neto Cultural Center in the capital of Angola. Also, Jong Hui Jin participated in the creation of one of the museum's paintings. In 2020, the Cambodian government closed several North Korean businesses including the museum to comply with United Nations sanctions.

== Collections ==
The museum features a 360-degree mural of the 12th century Angkorian Empire depicting artisans and warriors at war, the mural is 123 meters long and 13 meters high. 63 artists worked on the mural, which took a year and a half to complete. The museum contains a painting of King Jayavarman VII on top of an elephant leading the soldiers. The historical details of the museum's paintings were investigated by the Cambodian Ministry of Culture, under the administration of Director General of Heritage Hab Touch. The museum contains miniature models of the main Angkor temples as well as maps of ancient temples located in different parts of Cambodia. Other paintings in the museum include a painting of a smiling Buddha, based on a reproduction of the stone faces from the Bayon Temple. The museum contains exhibits on the 1471 Cham-Vietnamese War as well as on the construction of the Bayon Temple. The museum contains a series of photographs showing the North Korean artists painting the mural. The museum contains 3D films on the evolution of the Angkorian Empire.
