= Preah Norodom Sihanouk-Angkor Museum =

Cambodian history museum

- Established: November 2, 2007; 18 years ago
- Location: Siem Reap, Cambodia
- Coordinates: 13.382114°N 103.880790°E

The Preah Norodom Sihanouk-Angkor Museum (Khmer: សារៈមន្ទីរព្រះនរោត្តម សីហនុ-អង្គរ) is a museum located in Siem Reap, Cambodia. The museum is dedicated to displaying exhibits on the history of Cambodia's civilization through various cultural and archaeological artifacts.

== History ==
The construction of the museum was financed by AEON, Cambodian cultural agency APSARA and Japan’s Sophia University. One of the reasons this museum was built was to preserve artifacts from excavations. On November 2, 2007, the museum was inaugurated.

A renovation mainly intended for the repair of the museum's roof was carried out in 2016-2017.

== Collections ==
The museum has a collection of statues and archaeological remains. The museum is dedicated to preserving the cultural heritage of Cambodia, among one of these collections is pottery and ancient art of the country. This museum contains an exhibition of ceramics dating from the 15th to the 19th century. Much of the museum's statues come from the Banteay Kdei Temple excavation. Among the sculptures that stand out are the statues of Buddha, the museum has collections on the religious heritage of Cambodia. The museum contains archaeological remains such as skulls dating back to the Bronze Age. The sculptures date from three important periods in Cambodia's history including the Angkor period, the Baphuon period and the Bayon period. The museum also contains a collection of crockery.
