= Angkor National Museum =

Archaeological museum in Siem Reap, Cambodia

- សារមន្ទីរជាតិអង្គរ
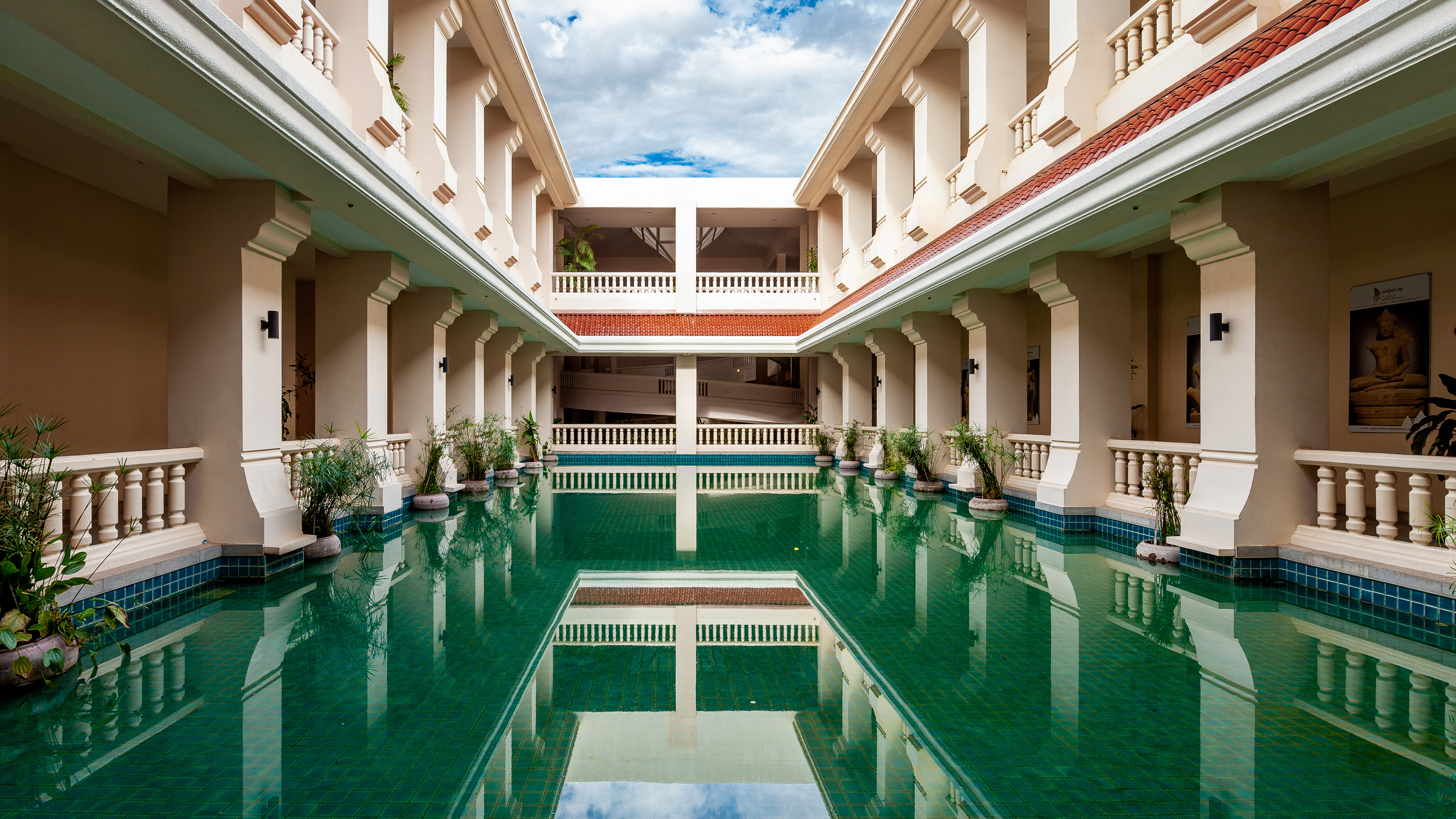
- Interior courtyard of the museum
- Established: 12 November 2007
- Location: Preah Sihanouk Ave, Siem Reap
- Coordinates: 13.3666°N 103.8599°E
- Type: Archaeology museums
- Website: angkornationalmuseum.com

Angkor National Museum (Khmer: សារមន្ទីរជាតិអង្គរ) is an archaeological museum in Siem Reap, Cambodia. It is dedicated to the collection, preservation and presentation of Angkorian artifacts, also to provides information and education about art and culture of Khmer civilization, with collections mainly dated from Khmer Empire's Angkor period circa 9th to 14th-century. Most of the artifacts are discovered in and around the Angkor archaeological sites nearby.

Opened on 12 November 2007, the Angkor National Museum covers the golden era of the Khmer Empire, making use of audio-visual multimedia technology. The museum covers Khmer history, civilization, and cultural heritage in eight galleries. This museum is owned by Cambodia in ក្រុងសៀមរាប . It is currently displaying archaeological objects borrowed from the Cambodian National Museum in Phnom Penh. Another source of artifacts is the Conservation d'Angkor, a storage facility of some 6,000 pieces created by the École française d'Extrême-Orient in 1908 and currently in the hands of the Cambodian Ministry of Culture.

== Galleries ==
The exhibits in this museum are arranged in flowing single direction through themed galleries. Audio guides are available at the entrance in Khmer language, English, French, German, Japanese, Chinese, Korean and Thai language. The galleries are:

1. The Briefing Hall: Before entering the galleries, visitors are invited to sit in an 80-seat theater for an orientation which will introduce the museum collections, galleries, and its amenities. Show times are scheduled for every 15 minutes and are available in 7 languages; Khmer, Korean, Japanese, Chinese, English, French and Thai.
2. Gallery of 1,000 Buddha: The gallery displays Buddhism spiritual influence upon Cambodian people, from the ancient Khmer civilization to the modern Cambodia. The gallery contains the collections of Buddha statues and relics.
3. Gallery A: Khmer Civilization: The gallery explains how the Khmer Empire was established, learn what drove the ancient Khmer to create colossal structures, their faith in their great kings and the history of the land.
4. Gallery B: Religion and Beliefs: Explains about religion and beliefs of Khmer civilization, including literary works, sculptures, architecture and daily life.
5. Gallery C: Great Khmer Kings: The gallery displays the history about famous Khmer kings, such as King Jayavarman II, the king who united the two kingdoms of Chenla around 802–850. King Yasovarman I who established Angkor as the capital between 889 and 900. King Suryavarman II who built Angkor Wat circa 1116–1145. And King Jayavarman VII who built Angkor Thom circa 1181–1201.
6. Gallery D: Angkor Wat: The gallery displays the history, spiritual concept and architectural technique of constructing the grand structure of Angkor Wat. It also explains the Angkor Wat's equinox phenomenon.
7. Gallery E: Angkor Thom: The exhibit in this gallery displays about the construction and expansion of Angkor Thom. The changes in religious beliefs, also about ancient engineering plans for public utilities, such roads and large scale irrigation projects to support the city's population.
8. Gallery F: Story from Stone: The gallery displays stone inscriptions found throughout Angkor that recorded important historical events.
9. Gallery G: Ancient Costume: The gallery displays the ancient Khmer clothing, jewelry and accessories illustrated by sculptures of gods, goddesses, and the apsara celestial dancers.

== Gallery ==
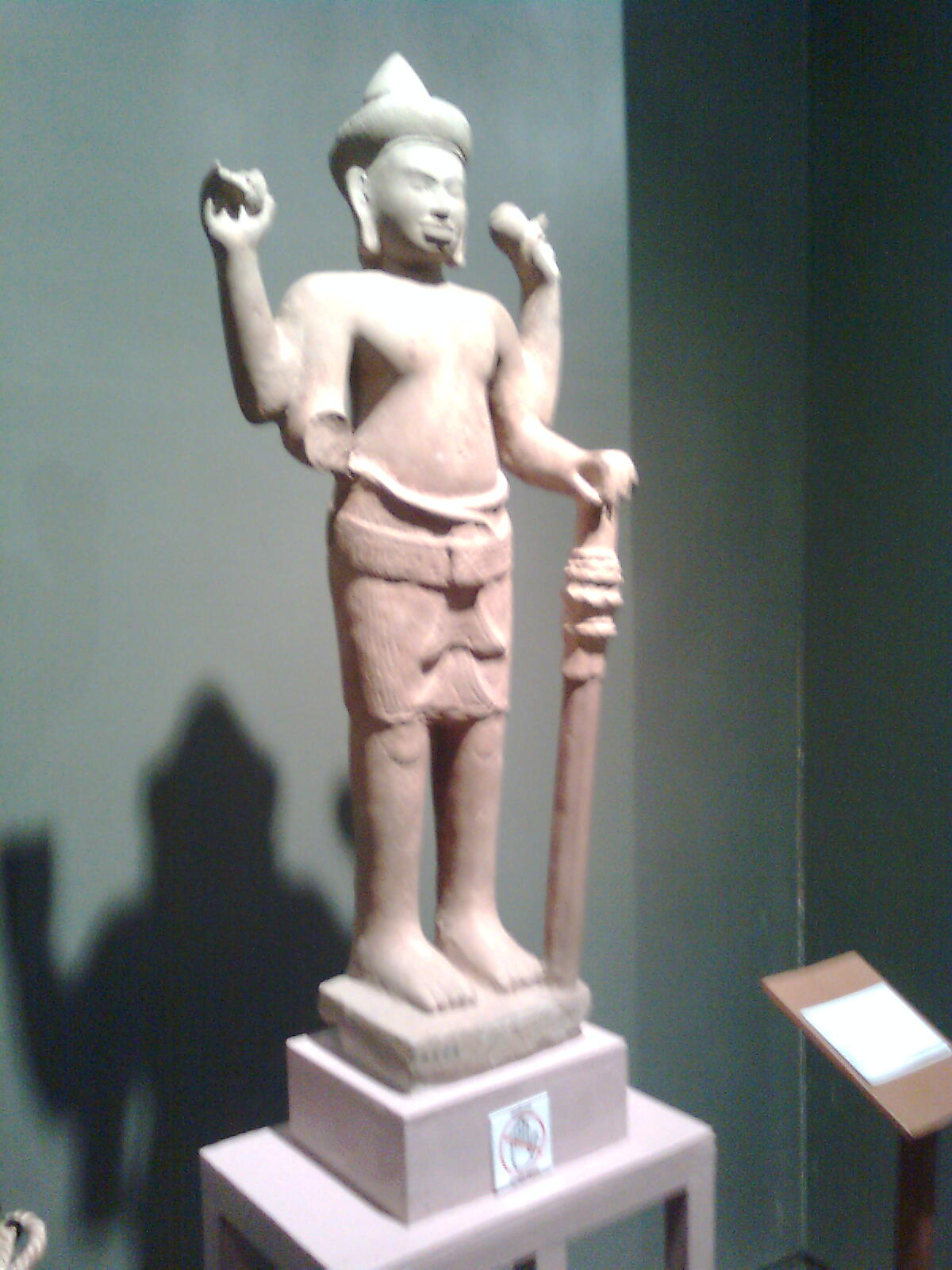

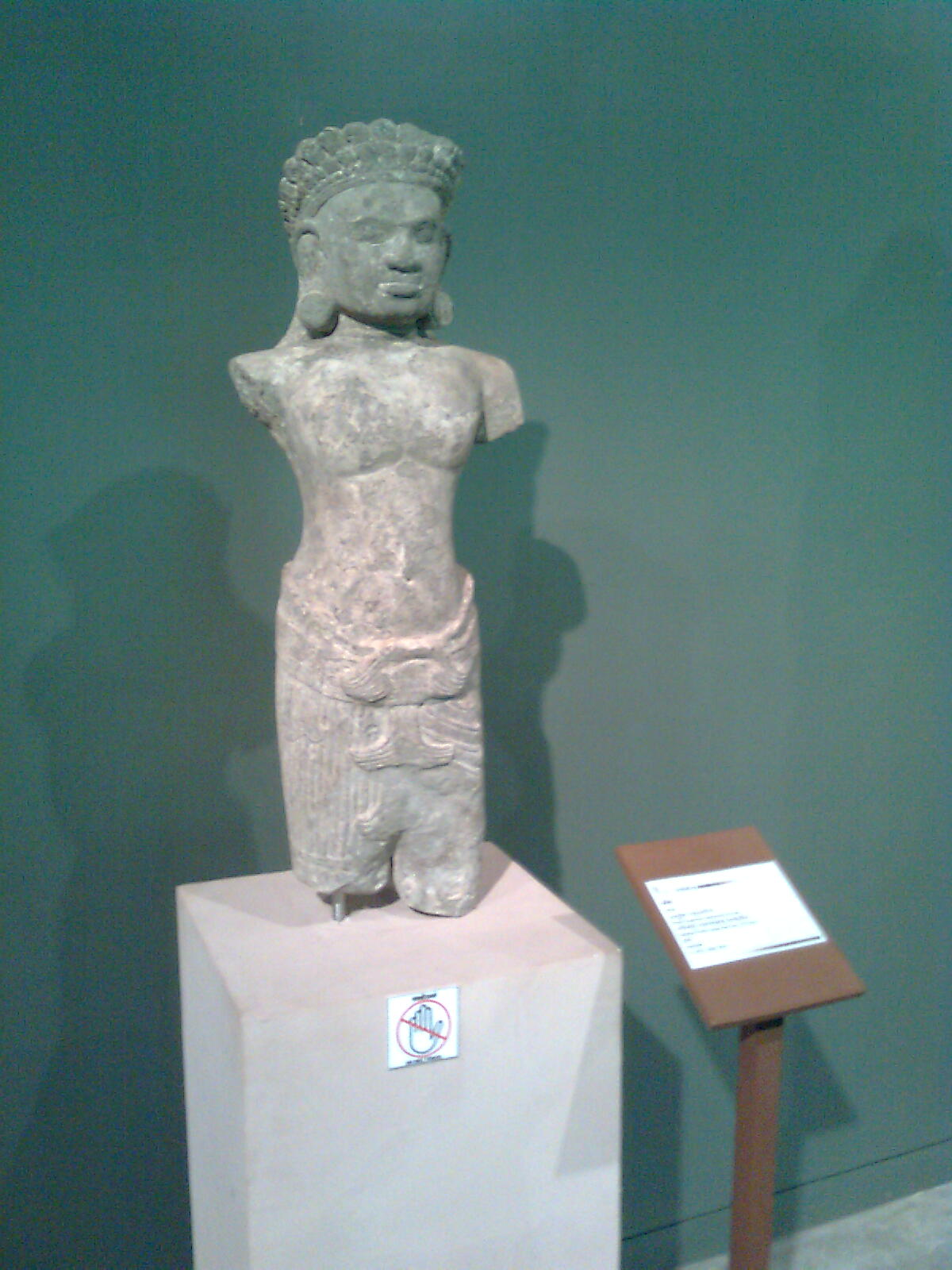

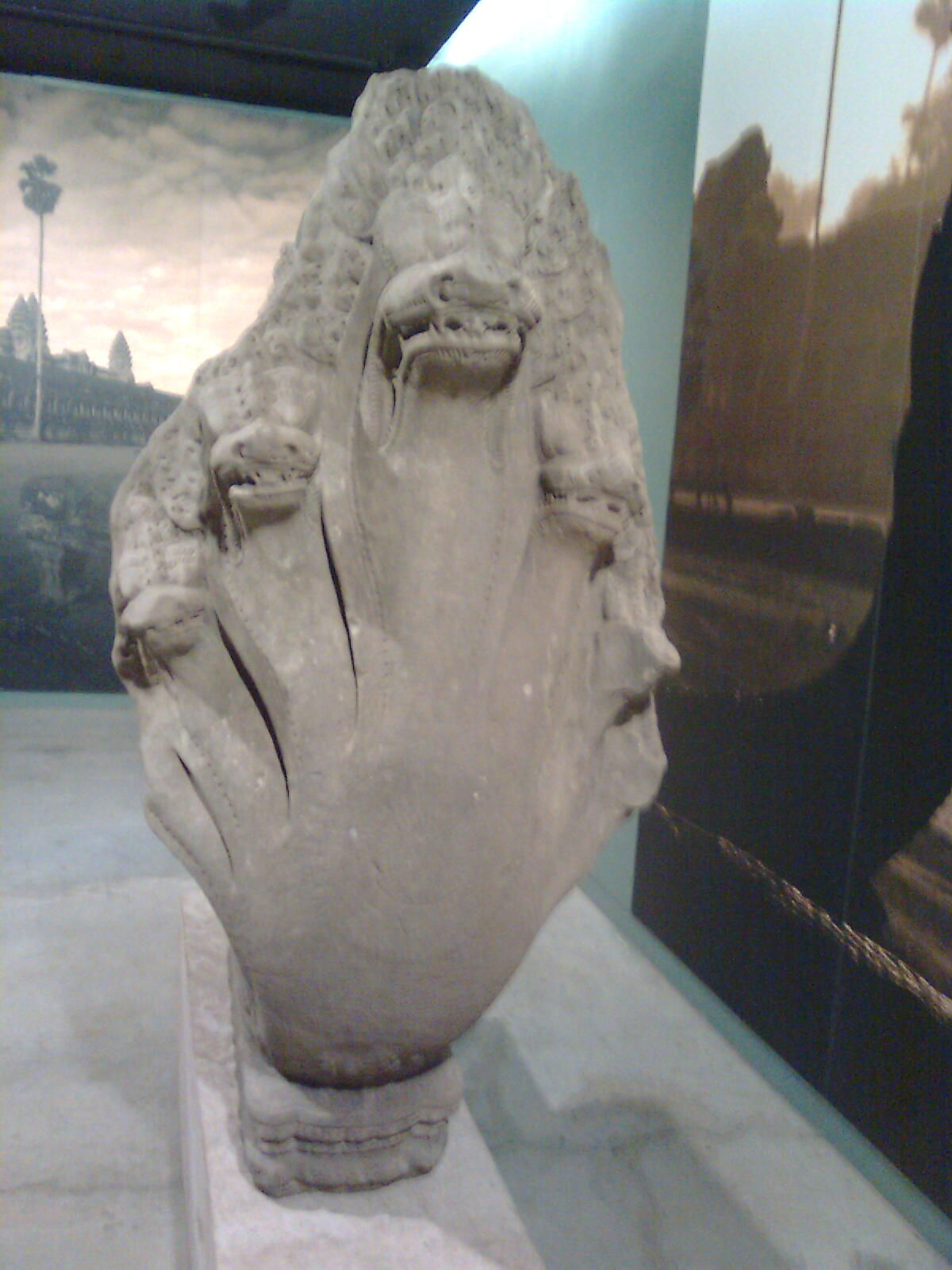

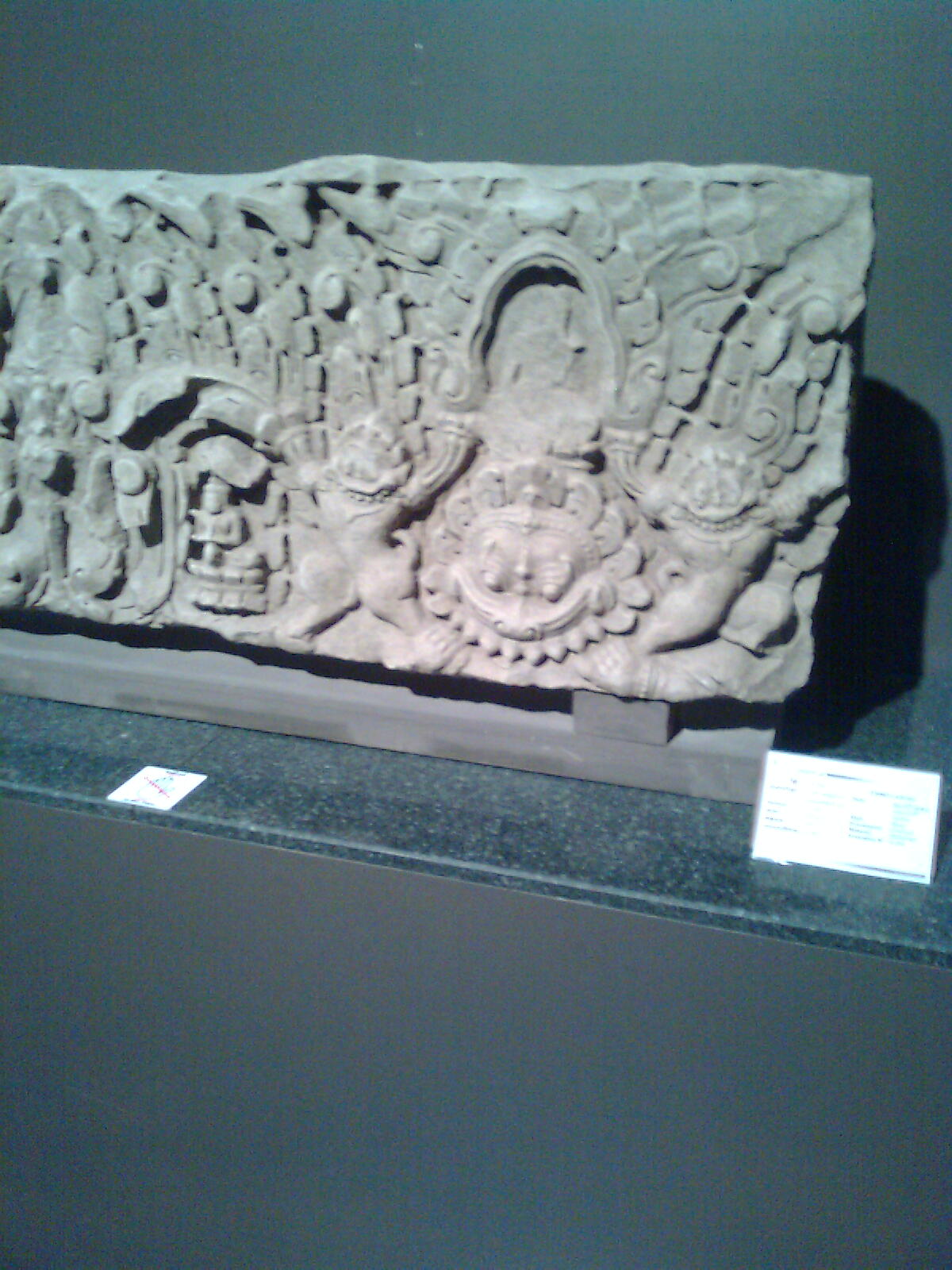

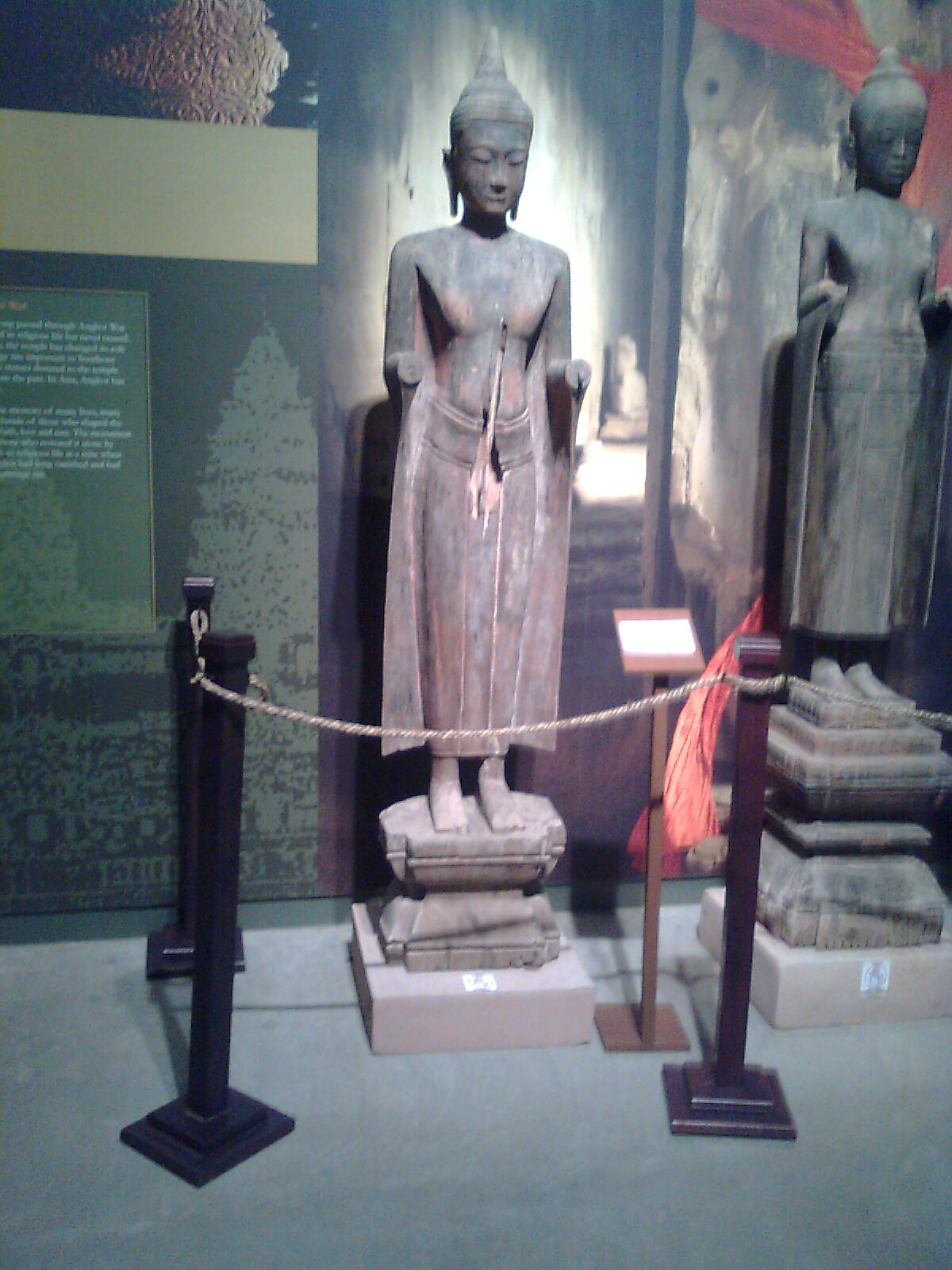

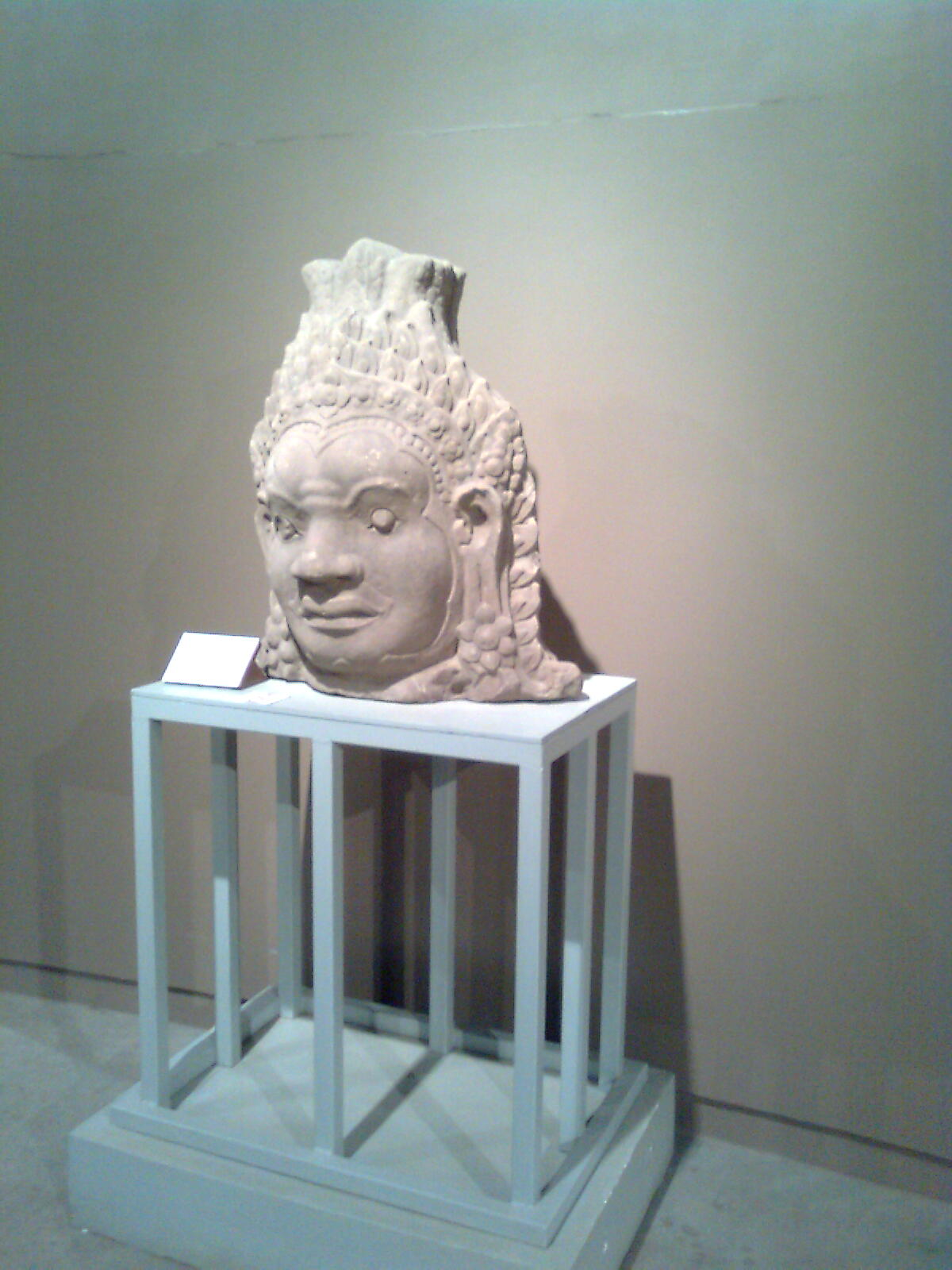

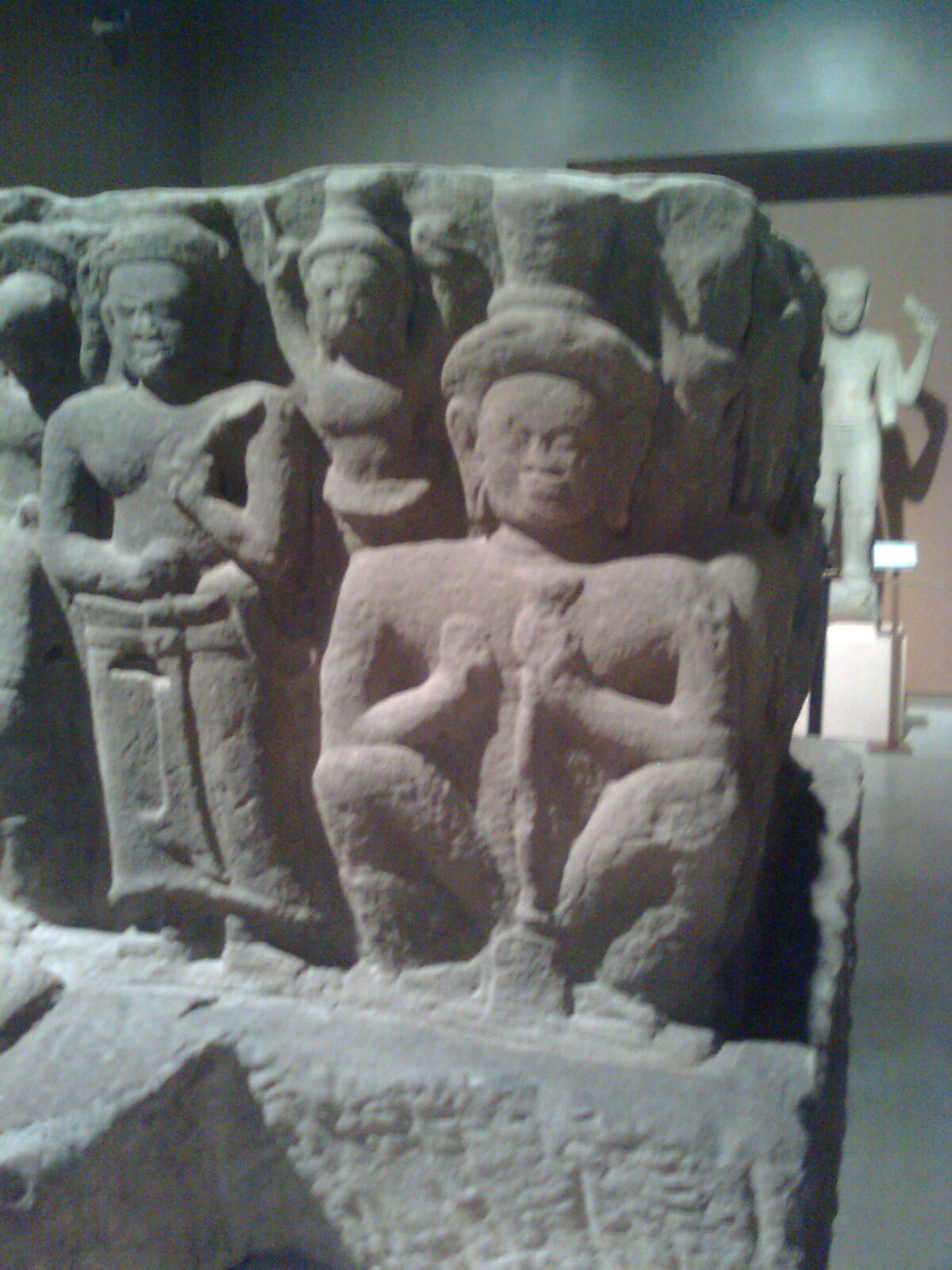

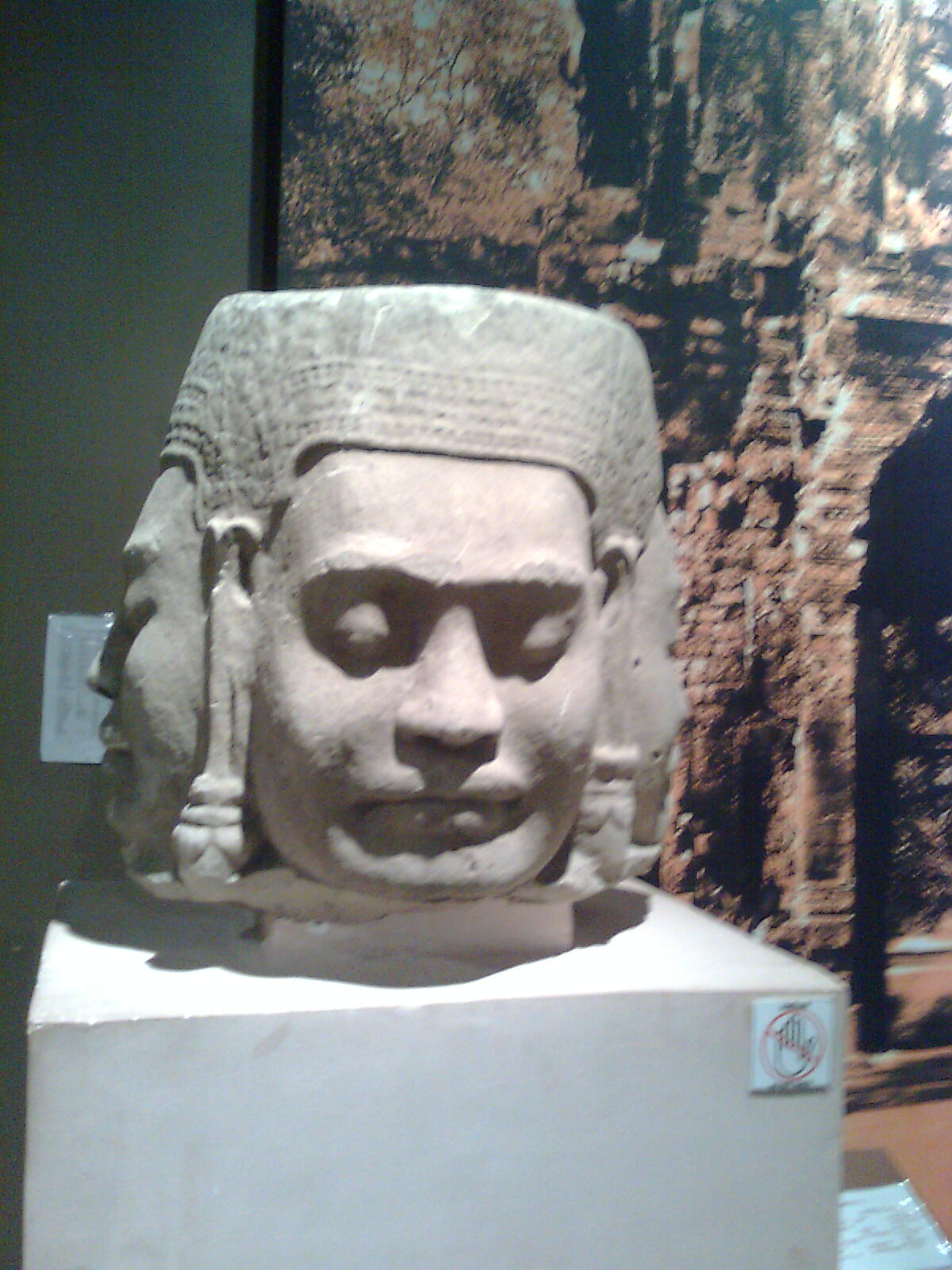

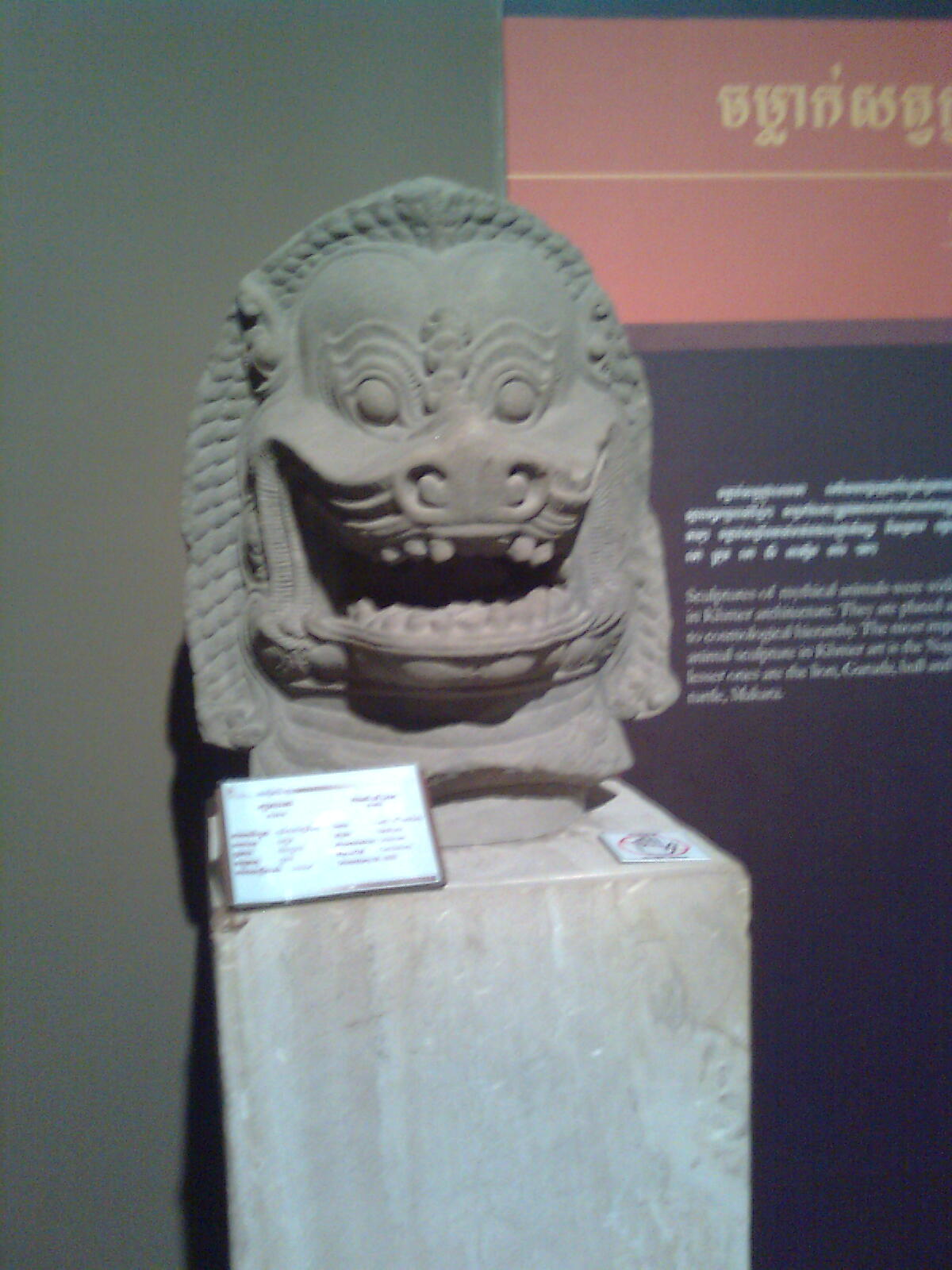

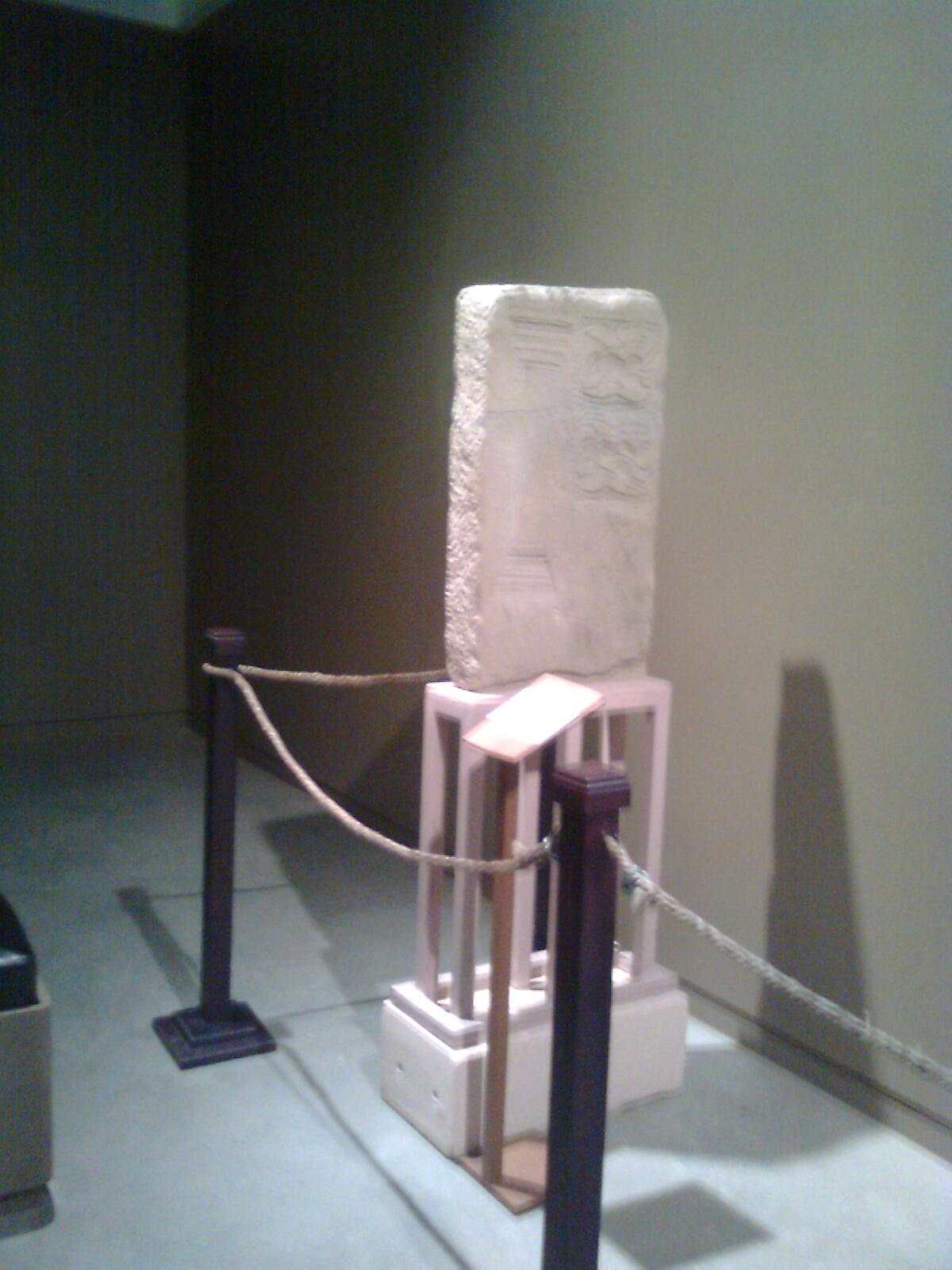

== Criticism ==
The name of the museum and its ownership has drawn controversy and criticism. Salient issues include the fact that it is foreign-owned by a Thai enterprise, which some critics find at odds with the “national” epithet in its name, and that it is suspected to be primarily interested in turning a profit instead of a genuine cultural motivation. Another criticism has been that the majority of the Buddha images in the gallery of 1,000 Buddhas are from an era of aesthetic influence from the Thai Ayutthaya Kingdom, while the critics would favor a focus on the earlier era of the Angkor kingdom. The museum design also been criticized as taking form as a "Cultural Mall".
