= MGC Asian Traditional Textiles Museum =

Museum in Siem Reap, Cambodia

- សារមន្ទីរវាយនភណ្ឌប្រពៃណីអាស៊ី
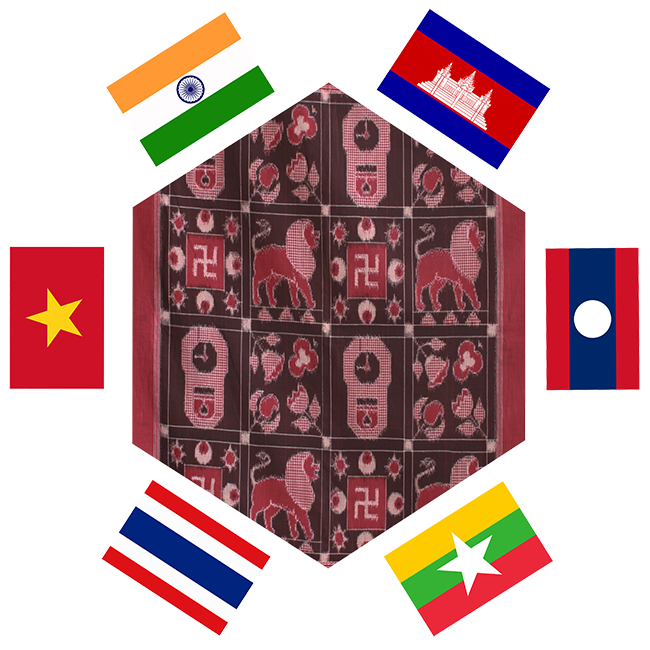
- Established: April 7, 2014; 12 years ago
- Location: 60m Avenue, Phum Boeung Daun Pa, Sangkat Slorkram, Siem Reap, Cambodia.
- Coordinates: 13.375373°N 103.880242°E

The Mekong Ganga Cooperation (MGC) Asian Traditional Textiles Museum (Khmer: សារៈមន្ទីរវាយនភណ្ឌប្រពៃណីអាស៊ី) is a museum located in Siem Reap, Cambodia. The aims of the museum are to facilitate the communication of the people living along the Mekong and Ganga rivers to show the civilization, culture and trade relations of the member countries such as Cambodia, India, Laos, Myanmar, Thailand and Vietnam.
