= Angkor Ceramic Museum at Tani =

Museum in Cambodia

- សារមន្ទីរកុលាលភាជន៍អង្គរ ភូមិតានី
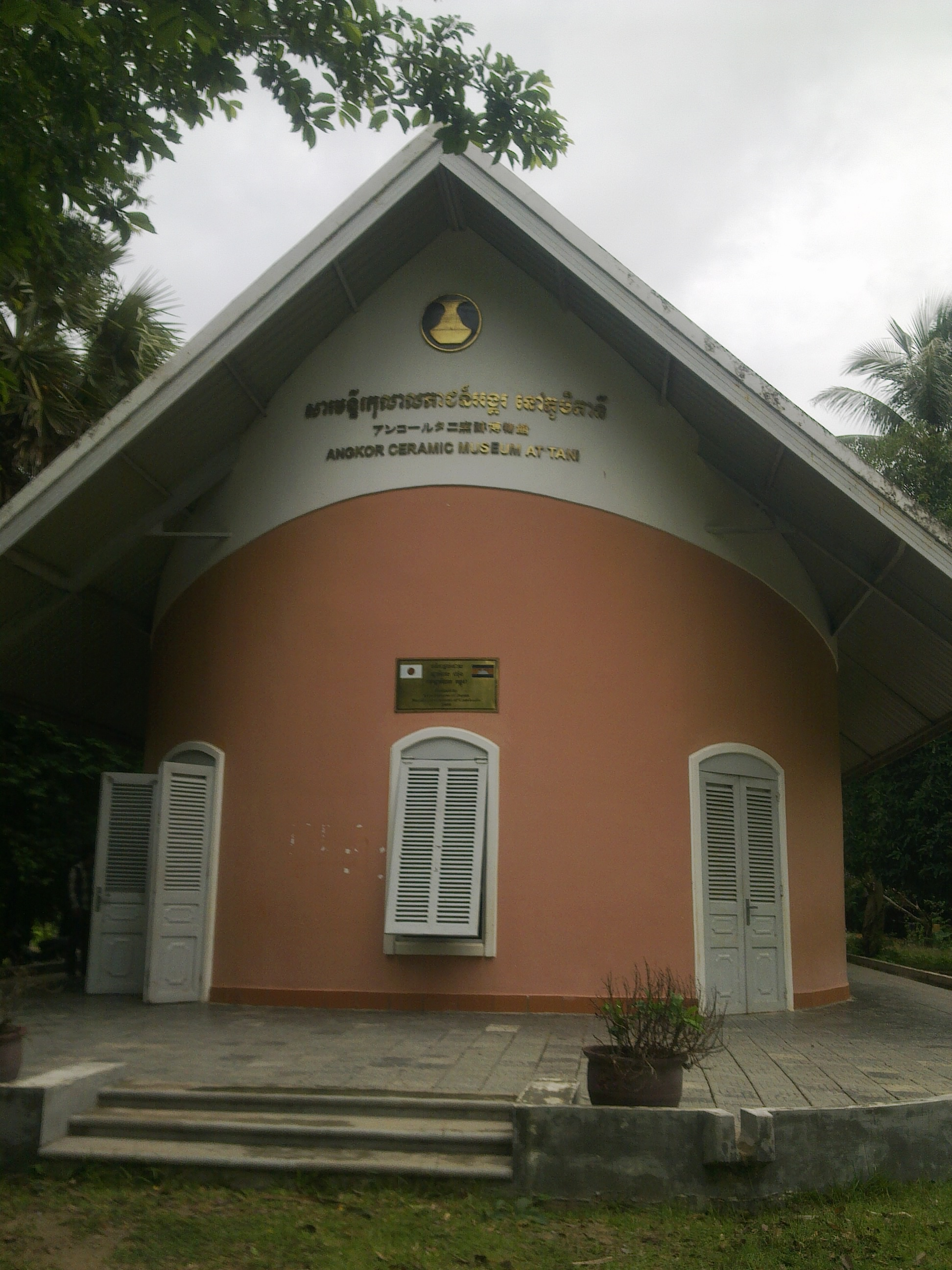
- Established: December 15, 2009; 16 years ago
- Location: Tani Village, Run Ta Ek Commune, Prasat Bakong District, Siem Reap, Cambodia.
- Coordinates: 13.4787811°N 104.0083639°E

The Angkor Ceramic Museum at Tani (Khmer: សារៈមន្ទីរកុលាលភាជន៍អង្គរភូមិតានី) is a museum located in Tani Village, Siem Reap, Cambodia. In 1990s, researchers have discovered some locations of Khmer ancient kiln in Angkor area. Excavation on the furnace structure, the process of ancient kiln and Khmer ceramics in Tani village began in 1996.
Angkor Ceramic Museum at Tani is the first museum in Cambodia to be built on an archaeological site and opened in 2009. This museum provides important information about the daily life, trade, development of handicrafts and Khmer ceramics of ancestors during the Angkor period.
