= Ministry of Culture and Fine Arts (Cambodia) =

Government ministry of Cambodia

- ក្រសួងវប្បធម៌ និងវិចិត្រសិល្បៈ Krasuong Voappathoa ning Vichet Selpa

Agency overview
- Formed: October 1997
- Jurisdiction: Government of Cambodia
- Headquarters: 227 Norodom Blvd, Phnom Penh, Cambodia 12205; 11.532644°N 104.929354°E
- Minister responsible: Phoeurng Sackona, Minister of Culture and Fine Arts
- Website: mcfa.gov.kh

The Ministry of Culture and Fine Arts (MCFA; Khmer: ក្រសួងវប្បធម៌ និងវិចិត្រសិល្បៈ, Krasuong Voappathoa ning Vichet Selpa) is the government ministry of Cambodia with a mandate to promote and preserve Cambodian culture.

== See also ==
- Culture of Cambodia
- Government of Cambodia
