= Tep Vattho =

Cambodian politician

Personal details
- Born: 1963 Phnom Penh, Cambodia
- Died: 2016 (aged 52–53) Siem Reap, Cambodia
- Spouse: Olivier Piot
- Children: David Piot
- Occupation: Architect, politician, hotel owner

Tep Vattho (1963 – 2016) was a Cambodian architect, hotel owner, urban planner and director of the urban planning department of the Apsara Authority (Authority for the Protection of the Site and Management of the Region of Angkor) in Siem Reap, Cambodia.

== Biography ==
Tep Vattho was daughter of judge and minister of justice for Cambodia, His Excellency Tep Hun,

Tep Vattho fled the country to France, at the age of 12. Two weeks later, Cambodia imploded with the bloody zeal of its Khmer Rouge rulers. In France, she studied medicine for two years, but switched to architecture, where she met and married French colleague Architect Olivier Piot.

In the city of Siem Reap, the second-largest city of Cambodia and just 14 km from the Angkor Wat, the Architect couple created two large hotels and a theater with unique design, Angkor Village Hotel (1994), Angkor Village Resort, and Siem Reaps oldest theater, Angkor Village Apsara Theatre (1997).

Tep Vattho died in 2016 at her home in Siem Reap city, aged 53, survived by her husband, and two sons.

Tep Vattho is the mother of David Piot, manager for the family enterprices Angkor Village Hotel, Angkor Village Apsara Theatre and the elephant retirement park Kulen Elephant Forest.

== Distinctions ==
- (Cambodia) The road Rue Tep Vattho, along Siem Reap River and Angkor Village Resort in Siem Reap.
