= Tep Hun =

Cambodian politician

His Excellency Tep Hun

Minister of Justice
- In office 1967–1969
- Preceded by: Yem Sambaur
- Succeeded by: Yem Sambaur

Personal details
- Died: 1975? Phnom Penh
- Party: Sangkum
- Occupation: Judge, politician, orchid producer

H.E. Tep Hun was a former orchid producer, judge, and minister of justice for Cambodia, during the last years of the Norodom Sihanouk's Sangkum Reastr Niyum regime.

After the military coup of 1970, he was threaten and forced to seat in the Vice-President’s chair of the new Khmer Republic's Parliament

He was captured and killed, soon after the fall of Phnom Penh in 1975, by the Khmer Rouge.

He is the father of Tep Vattho (1963-2016) architect, former urbanist and director of the urban planning department of the Apsara Authority (Authority for the Protection of the Site and Management of the Region of Angkor), and he is grandfather of David Piot, manager for the family enterprises Angkor Village Hotel, Angkor Village Apsara Theatre and the elephant retirement park Kulen Elephant Forest.
