= David-Jaya Piot =

British/Cambodian hotelier

President of Siem Reap Chapter of Cambodia Hotel Association
- Incumbent
- Assumed office 2020

Personal details
- Born: 23 August 1996; Siem Reap, Cambodia
- Citizenship: Cambodian
- Parent(s): Olivier Piot and Tep Vattho
- Education: Economics and Finance
- Alma mater: Bentley University
- Occupation: Hotelier
- Known for: Owner of Angkor Village Resort & Hotels and Elephant retirement park Kulen Elephant Forest

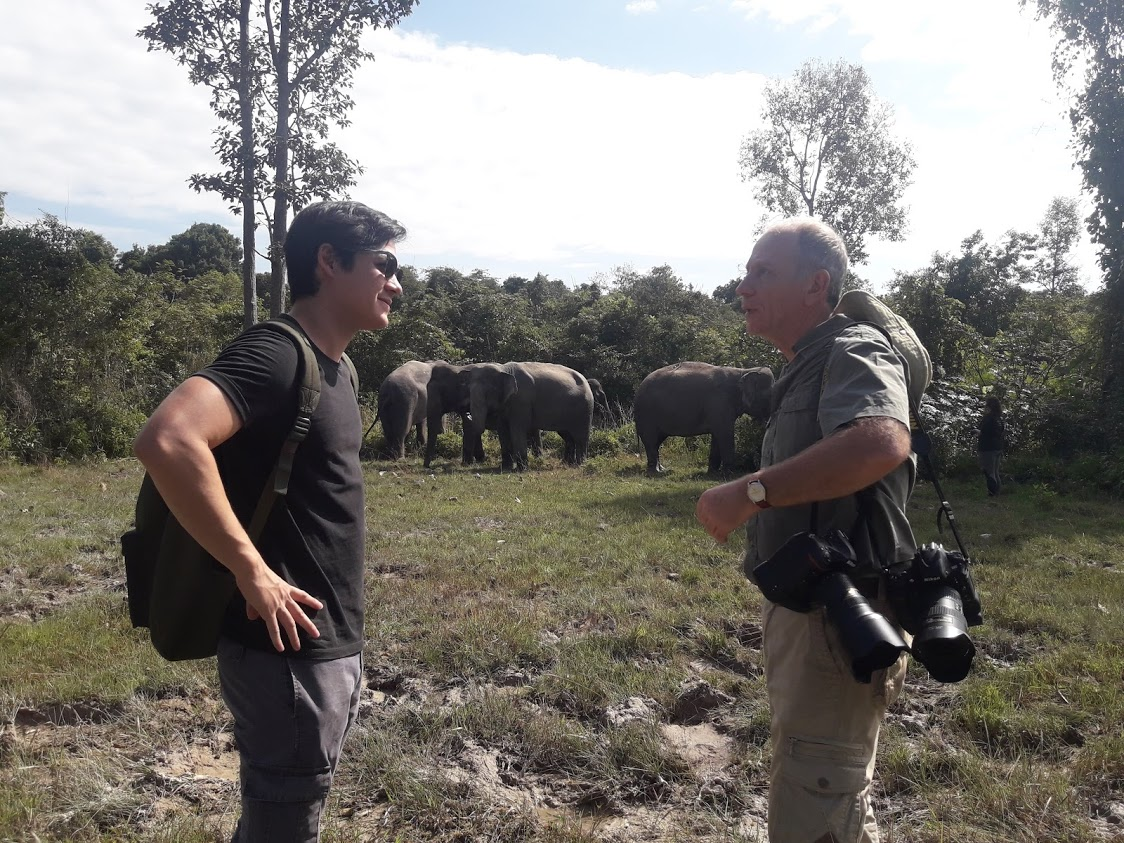
David Piot with photographer Philippe-Alexandre Chevallier and elephants at Kulen Elephant Forest

David-Jaya Piot (born 23 August 1996 in Siem Reap) is a French-Cambodian hotelier in Cambodia, president of Siem Reap Chapter of Cambodia Hotel Association. He is co-owner and managing director of the family enterprises Angkor Village Hotel, Angkor Village Apsara Theatre and co-founder of the elephant retirement park Kulen Elephant Forest.

== Biography ==
David Piot was born and raised in Siem Reap by a family of Siem Reap's first post-civil war hoteliers. He is the grandson of judge and minister of justice for Cambodia, His Excellency Tep Hun, and son of French Architect Olivier Piot and his wife late Tep Vattho (1963 – 2016), former director of the urban planning department of the Apsara Authority (Authority for the Protection of the Site and Management of the Region of Angkor) in Siem Reap.

Piot left Cambodia at age 12 to attend secondary school in Switzerland at Institut Le Rosey and went on to earn his bachelor's degree in Economics and Finance at Bentley University in Massachusetts 2013 – 2017. After leaving the finance sector, Piot returned to Cambodia to co-found Kulen Elephant Forest. He has been managing director for the family owned enterprises Angkor Village Hotel, Angkor Village Resort and Angkor Village Apsara Theatre in Siem Reap, since 2020.

David Piot's parents also operated the Angkor Elephant Company, which used to offer elephant rides around the temples. The family had tried their hand at creating an elephant sanctuary near Kbal Spean, in 2003. The lukewarm reception and eventual bankruptcy of this undertaking was primarily due to the lack of interest in eco-tourism at the time of creation.

In 2017 David co-founded Siem Reap's first Elephant Retirement Park for Cambodia's largest privately owned elephant herd, the first and only ACES (Asian Captive Elephant Standards) certified facility in Cambodia. protecting the captive Asian elephants in Siem Reap Province in Cambodia, as well as protecting up to 1100 acres of protected forest inhabited by the former elephants of Angkor UNESCO World Heritage site.

Piot was elected President of the Siem Reap Chapter of the Cambodia Hotel Association in 2020. As the associations youngest ever chapter president, he represented the private sector during the COVID-19 pandemic, advocating for a cautious liberalization of the business landscape following the crisis. He was reelected for a second term in September 2022.
