= Éric Stocker =

French lacquer master and conservator

Éric Stocker (born Nantes, France) is a French master craftsman (maître laqueur) specializing in traditional Asian lacquerware, gilding, and polychromy. Active since 1974, he is known for his work in the conservation of Asian lacquer at the Mobilier national in Paris and for reviving traditional Cambodian lacquerware, which had been nearly destroyed during the Khmer Rouge regime.

In 1998, Stocker was invited by the European Union to train Cambodian artisans in Siem Reap as part of the Chantiers-Écoles de Formation Professionnelle. He subsequently served as director of crafts (Directeur des Métiers) at Artisans d'Angkor. His work on the conservation of Cambodian lacquer has been cited in peer-reviewed academic publications.

== Biography ==
=== Training and career in France ===
Stocker comes from a family of craftsmen spanning four generations, from mosaic work and gilding to lacquer. In 1974, he began his apprenticeship with Pierre Bobot (1902–1974), a French lacquer artist and restorer who had worked with Art Deco masters Jean Dunand and Eileen Gray.

For 25 years, Stocker worked as a lacquer restorer at the Mobilier national, specializing in the conservation of Chinese and Japanese lacquerware for French national museums.

=== Cambodia ===
In 1998, Stocker was invited by the European Union to participate in the Chantiers-Écoles de Formation Professionnelle in Siem Reap, a programme aimed at reviving traditional Cambodian handicrafts that had been devastated during decades of conflict. Upon arrival, he located surviving lacquer trees (Gluta laccifera) in Kampong Thom Province.

Starting with 12 apprentices, Stocker trained approximately 350 Cambodian artisans in lacquer, gilding, and polychromy. He became director of crafts (Directeur des Métiers) at Artisans d'Angkor.

In 2008, together with his brother Thierry, Stocker founded his own workshop, Angkor Artwork, in Siem Reap, later renamed Stocker Studio. The workshop employs Cambodian artisans, including deaf craftspeople trained through the Krousar Thmey association.

In July 2018, Stocker conducted a workshop for 30 conservation professionals from the APSARA Authority on the use of traditional Cambodian lacquer for the conservation of 12th-century Buddha statues at Pre Rup. In 2020, a team from Stocker Studio treated a Pre Rup Buddha statue using lacquer-based methods.

In 2019, he was awarded the Trophée Culture/Art de vivre at the Trophées des Français de l'étranger.

== Publication ==
- Éric Stocker, Lacquer Stone Conservation, Siem Reap: Angkor Artwork, 2020.

== See also ==
- Lacquerware
- Pierre Bobot
- Cambodian art
- Artisans d'Angkor
- Mobilier national
- Krousar Thmey
