= Chem Snguon =

Cambodian politician

Chem Snguon (1926-1999) was a Cambodian politician and member of the cabinet.

He was born in 1926 in Phnom Penh. He worked in the administration of Norodom Sihanouk and followed him into exile as ambassador of National United Front of Kampuchea in Algeria and Egypt. In 1975 he returned to Cambodia, and was briefly detained and then sent to political camp of returnees in Kampong Cham province. He remained in the camp until the 1978 Vietnamese invasion. He then renounced his ties with Norodom Sihanouk and agreed to work with the new revolutionary council led by Heng Samrin.

He was the deputy minister of justice from 1983 to 1993, and then the minister of justice for Cambodia from 1993 to 1998. In 1993 he was a member of the Constitution Drafting Committee. He was elected to the National Assembly in 1993 and in 1998. However, he died of cancer in New York on 14 June 1999.
