= The School for Field Studies =

Environmental study abroad program

- Abbreviation: SFS
- Formation: 1980; 46 years ago
- Type: Non-governmental organization
- Purpose: Environmental education
- Location: Beverly, Massachusetts
- Services: Undergraduate study abroad programs
- President: James Cramer, Ph.D.

The School for Field Studies (SFS) is the United States' largest environmental study abroad program provider for undergraduate college students, offering fully accredited semester- and summer-long academic programs in over 10 countries around the world. SFS students and staff conduct field research, driven by strategic research plans, to address environmental issues which affect both the communities in which the organization operates and the world in general. More than 18,000 students have studied abroad with SFS since it was founded in 1980. SFS is a 501(c)(3) non-profit organization, currently based out of Beverly, Massachusetts.

== Programs ==
SFS offers more than 20 semester and summer programs around the world. Programs are based out of SFS-operated permanent field stations which are located in areas of opportunity for academic study and community engagement. These field stations, known as Centers, are home to faculty, staff, and students; and anchor the strategic long-term research upon which the SFS mission is based. Each SFS Center has a particular academic focus and set of research themes to reflect the surrounding ecosystems and environmental issues. Semester program coursework generally covers ecology, environmental policy, natural resource management, and socioeconomics, while summer programs focus on more specific topics. The SFS website offers a full list of current programs.

=== Australia ===
The SFS Center for Rainforest Studies is located in Queensland, Australia, near the town of Yungaburra. Programs include the "Rainforest to Reef" semester program, and the "Rainforests of New Zealand and Australia" and "Watersheds of the Wet Tropics" summer programs. Research and coursework explore themes related to rainforest conservation and management, including downstream effects on the Great Barrier Reef.

=== Bhutan ===
The SFS Center for Himalayan Environment and Development Studies is located in the town of Paro, in western Bhutan. Programs include the "Himalayan Environment and Society in Transition" semester program, and the "Forests in the Land of the Thunder Dragon" summer program. Research and coursework explore themes related to mountain ecology, rural livelihoods, forest management, and the roles of religion and culture in environmental policy-making.

=== Cambodia ===
The SFS Center for Conservation and Development Studies is located in the city of Siem Reap, Cambodia. Programs include the "Conservation, Ethics, and Environmental Change" semester program, and the "Elephants of the Cambodian Highlands" summer program. Research and coursework explore themes related to elephant ecology at Keo Seima Wildlife Sanctuary and Elephant Valley Project (EVP) in Mondulkiri province, and Kulen Elephant Forest (KEF) in Siem Reap province, the impacts of climate change along the Mekong River, and the role of community governance in protecting natural resources.

=== Chile ===
The SFS Center for Climate Studies is located in the city of Puerto Natales, in Chilean Patagonia. Programs include the "Wild Patagonia: Fire and Ice" semester program. Research and coursework explore themes related to climate change, coastal and alpine ecology, glacial dynamics, and conservation.

=== Costa Rica ===
The SFS Center for Sustainable Development Studies is located in the town of Atenas, in Costa Rica's Central Valley. Programs include the "Sustainable Development Studies" semester program, and the "Coffee and Chocolate: A Taste of Sustainability" and "Fundamentals of Sustainability Research" summer programs. Research and coursework explore themes related to sustainable development, agriculture and permaculture, ecotourism, and biodiversity.

=== Kenya ===
The SFS Center for Water and Wildlife Studies is located in the town of Kimana, in Kenya's Rift Valley. Programs include the "Water, Wildlife, and Community" semester program, and the "Primates of the African Savanna" summer program. Research and coursework explore themes related to wildlife ecology, water quality and use, climate change, and national parks management.

=== Panama ===
The SFS Center for Tropical Island Biodiversity Studies is located in the town of Bocas del Toro, Panama. Programs include the "Tropical Island Biodiversity Studies" semester program, and the "Tourism and Tropical Island Ecosystems" summer program. Research and coursework explore themes related to tropical marine and terrestrial ecosystems, the impacts of tourism, and community livelihoods.

=== Peru ===
The SFS Center for Amazon Studies is located in Tarapoto, a city in the higher Amazon of Peru. Programs include the "Living Amazon" semester program. Research and coursework explore themes related to rainforest ecology, biodiversity, and environmental justice, and Indigenous rights. Research and coursework explore topics related to the impact of tourism and conservation areas on Indigenous communities, tropical ecology and ecosystems.

=== Tanzania ===
The SFS Center for Wildlife Management Studies is located in Rhotia, Tanzania, near Lake Manyara National Park and the Ngorongoro Conservation Area. Programs include the "Wildlife Management Studies" semester program, and the "Fundamentals of Wildlife Management" and "Carnivores of the African Plains" summer programs. Research and coursework explore themes related to wildlife management and ecology, human-wildlife conflicts, national parks management, and climate change.

=== Turks and Caicos Islands ===
The SFS Center for Marine Resource Studies is located on the island of South Caicos, in the Turks and Caicos archipelago. Programs include the "Marine Resource Studies" semester program, and the "Fundamentals of Marine Conservation" and "Marine Megafauna" summer programs. Research and coursework explore themes related to marine ecosystems, climate change and ocean acidification, fisheries, and marine protected areas.

== See also ==
- Study abroad in the United States
- Environmental non-governmental organization
