= Chhan Sokhom =

Cambodian politician

Chhan Sokhom (1924-1975) was a Cambodian politician and cabinet minister.

He was born on 22 December 1924 in Phnom Penh. He was a longtime friend and supporter of Lon Nol. He was an elected member of the National Assembly of Cambodia from 1962 to 1966. In 1970 he was a supporter of Lon Nol in the coup d'état. During the Khmer Republic he was minister of education until 1971, and made the decision to put more emphasis on the English language in schools, supplanting the role of French language. He was minister of industry, mines and fisheries from 1971 to 1972, and minister of justice for Cambodia from October 1972 to April 1973, then minister of interior and religion from 1973 to 1974.

It is believed that he was executed on 17 April 1975 by Khmer Rouge.
