= Ly Khvan Pan =

Cambodian politician

Ly Kvang Pann is the former minister of justice for Cambodia from 1973 to 1975.
