= Uk Vithun =

Cambodian politician and judge

Uk Vithun is a Cambodian politician and judge.

Vithun was a judge in charge of introducing a system of justice for children from 1970 to 1975. He lived exile in France from 1975 to 1982. As a member of FUNCINPEC, he was appointed as under-secretary of state for justice in 1993. He was the minister of justice for Cambodia from 1998 to 2001. He was removed from the position as a result of criticism from Hun Sen. He was replaced by Neav Sithong.
