= Artisans Angkor =

Cambodian social business

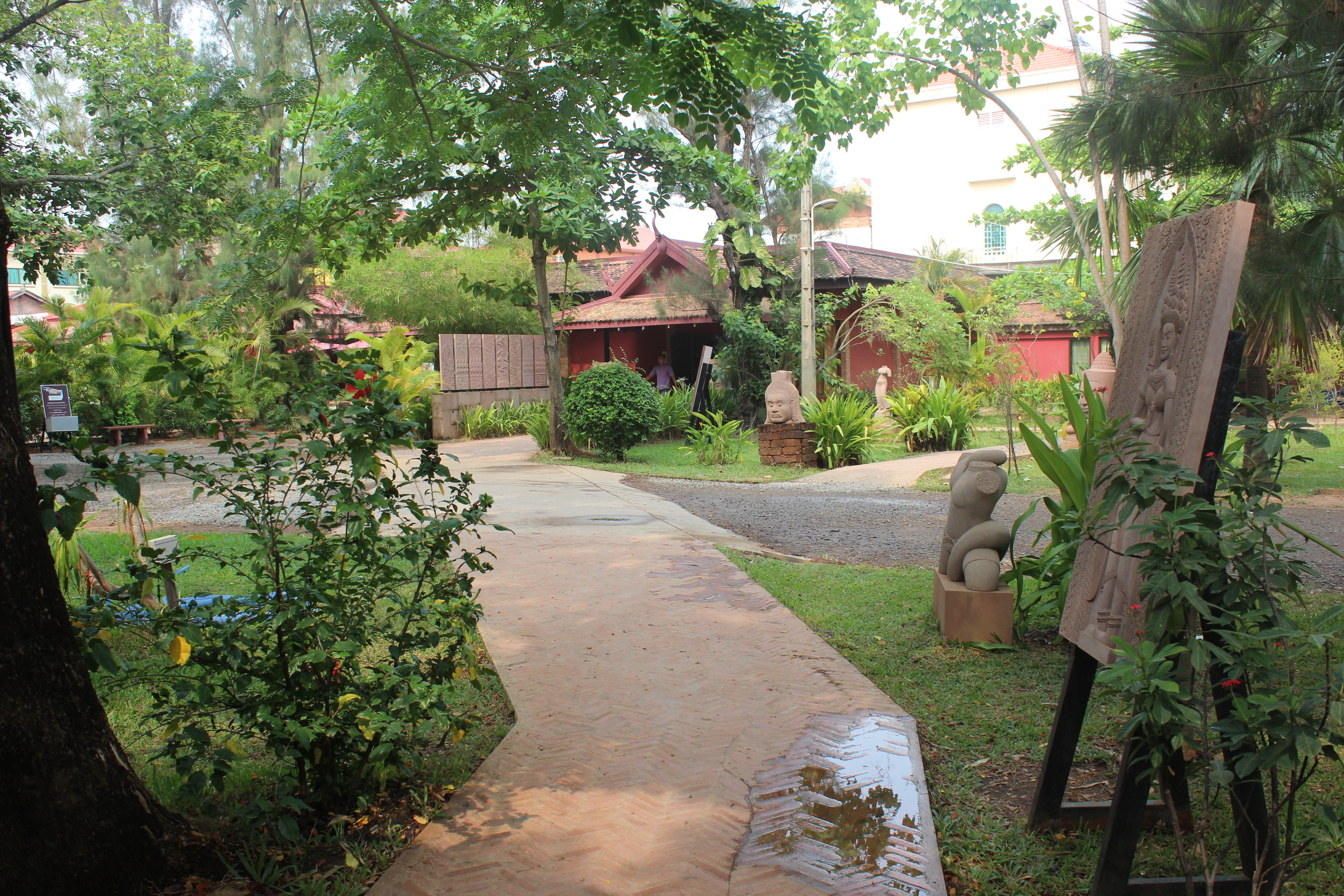
Main center on Stung Thmey Street

Artisans Angkor is a Cambodian social business established in 1992 with the aim of providing employment opportunities for rural youth while preserving traditional Khmer craftsmanship (stone and wood carving, carving, lacquering, and silver plating).

Artisans Angkor is located in Siem Reap, Cambodia, with its main workshop situated a short walk from the Old Market. The organisation operates two public sites: a crafts workshop on Stung Thmey Street and the Angkor Silk Farm located in Puok district.

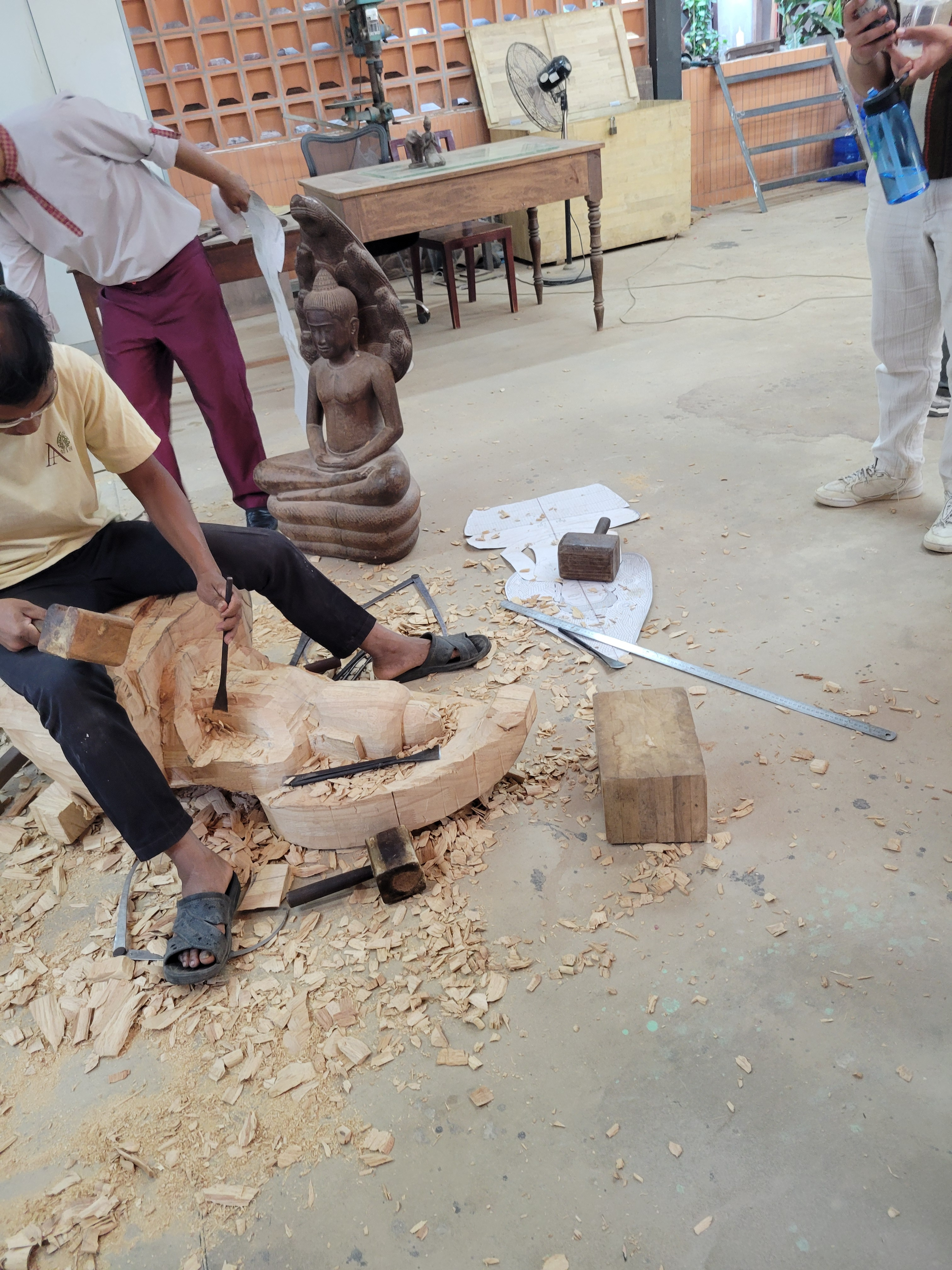
An artisan at work at Artisan Angkor's workshops.

Artisans Angkor products can be purchased at seven retail outlets, including shops in Siem Reap, the Angkor Silk Farm, Phnom Penh, and both Siem Reap and Phnom Penh International Airports. Seven shops selling handmade items made by Artisans Angkor are in Siem Reap centre, at the Angkor Silk Farm, at the Angkor Café in front of Angkor Wat temple, in Phnom Penh city centre and in Siem Reap and Phnom Penh International Airport as well.

== History ==
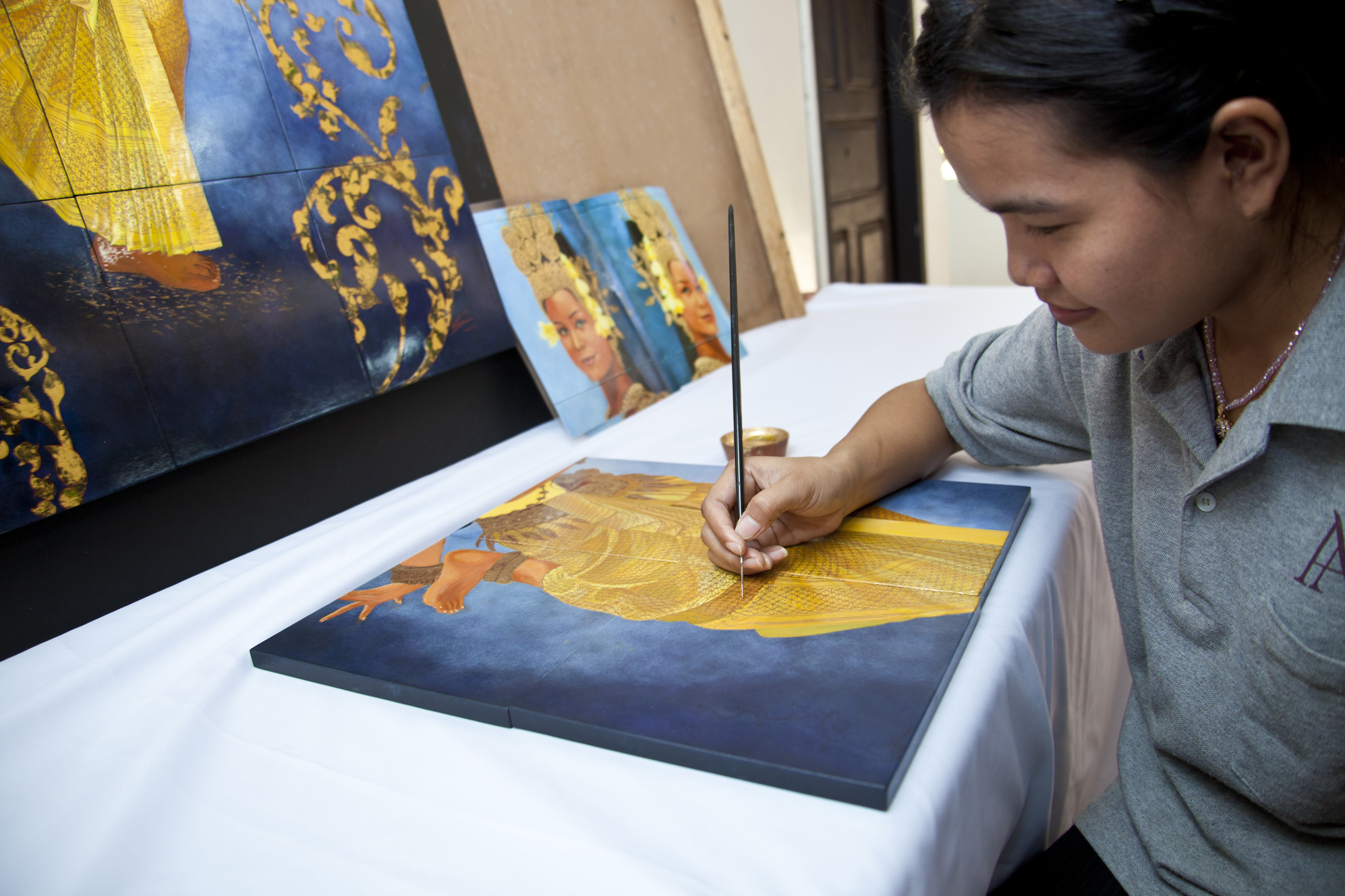
A craftswoman lacquering at Artisans Angkor

Artisans Angkor is a private business that have been issue from semi-public company whose story started in 1992, with an educational project called "Les Chantiers-Ecoles de Formation Professionnelle" (CEFP) implemented by the Cambodian Ministry of Education. This project aimed at rebuilding the country after the war period by training young people in the building sector, such as masonry, plumbing, tiling, painting, etc. Hence, "Les Chantiers-Ecoles de Formation Professionnelle" developed an educational methodology to provide those skills to underprivileged young Cambodians with little education.

In the mid-1990s, this training was extended to traditional Khmer craftsmanship, as this essential part of the Khmer cultural heritage had almost disappeared. At the end of the training, there were many employment opportunities for the young people trained in the building sector but as the tourism was not yet well-developed in Cambodia at that time, it was more difficult to find a job in the field of handicrafts.

A European program called "REPLIC" provided financial support between 1998 and 2001 to create a project called "Artisans Angkor" to be a workplace for the young Cambodians trained by CEFP in the handicraft sector. In 2003, with support of the Agence Française de Développement (French Agency for Development), Artisans Angkor became an autonomous and semi-public Cambodian company. The profits of the company are wholly reinvested in the new training programs or construction of new workplaces in the Siem Reap province.

The company has developed its own training program (independent from the CEFP) in the craft sector, giving young Cambodians aged from 18 to 25 years free vocational training in stone or wood carving, or lacquering, or silver plating. Young people mostly from remote rural areas close to a new workshop built by Artisans Angkor can apply for this training; they have to pass some of manual and motivational tests. The compensated training period lasts from 6 to 9 months and at the end of this apprenticeship, the trainees are granted the status of "artisans". If they wish, they can then join Artisans Angkor where an employment opportunity is guaranteed to them.

In 2013, Artisans Angkor employs more than 1300 people, of whom 900 are craftsmen and women working in 48 different workshops in the Siem Reap Province. The company provides a higher salary than the average wages in the sector and provides its employees with medical insurance and other benefits.

== Cambodian handmade silk ==
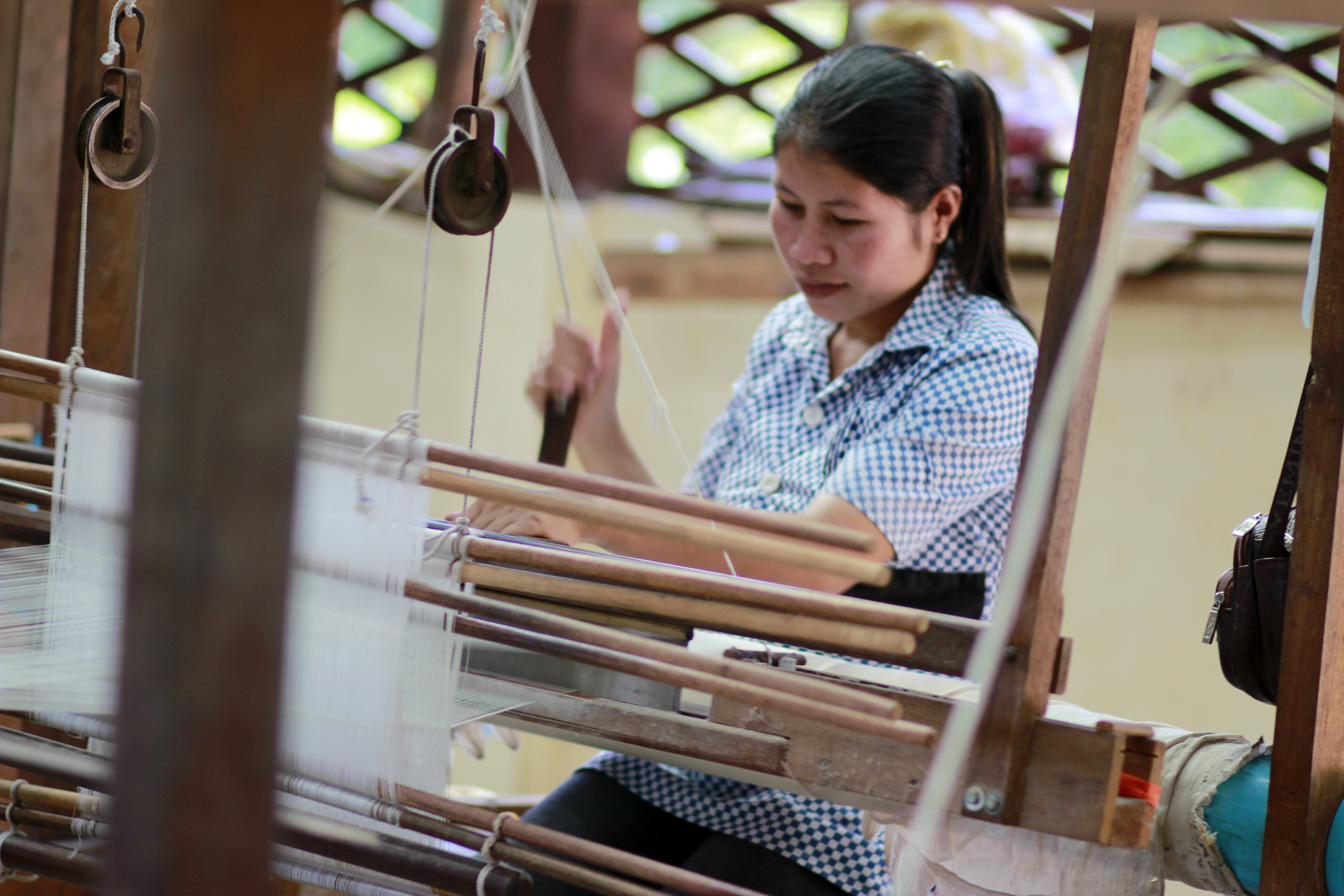
A Cambodian woman weaving silk threads in the very traditional way

Artisans Angkor is known as one of the finest silk producers in Cambodia. The company has 23 silk workshops in the Siem Reap province. One site only is open to the public: the Angkor Silk Farm in Puok district (about 20-minute drive from the centre of Siem Reap). Artisans specializing in silk are still trained by a unit of the CEFP called the “National Silk Centre” where the Angkor Silk Farm is located.

Silk weaving is a tradition that traces its origins back to the 13th century, as a result of the influence of the Silk Road in South Asia. It became an exclusive vocation for the women of rural villages who produced among others, one of the most famous Cambodian fabrics called “Hol Lboeuk” thanks to the traditional technique of “Ikat”. Artisans Angkor revives this ancient technique in Cambodia in its very traditional way.

=== Angkor Silk Farm ===
Angkor Silk Farm is a site gathering many silk workshops belonging to the Cambodian social enterprise Artisans Angkor. Visitors can discover through free guided tours the complete process of sericulture, from the cultivation of the mulberry bushes to the production of silk goods.

Angkor Silk Farm is located in Puok District, a 20-minute drive from Siem Reap centre, Cambodia.

==== History ====
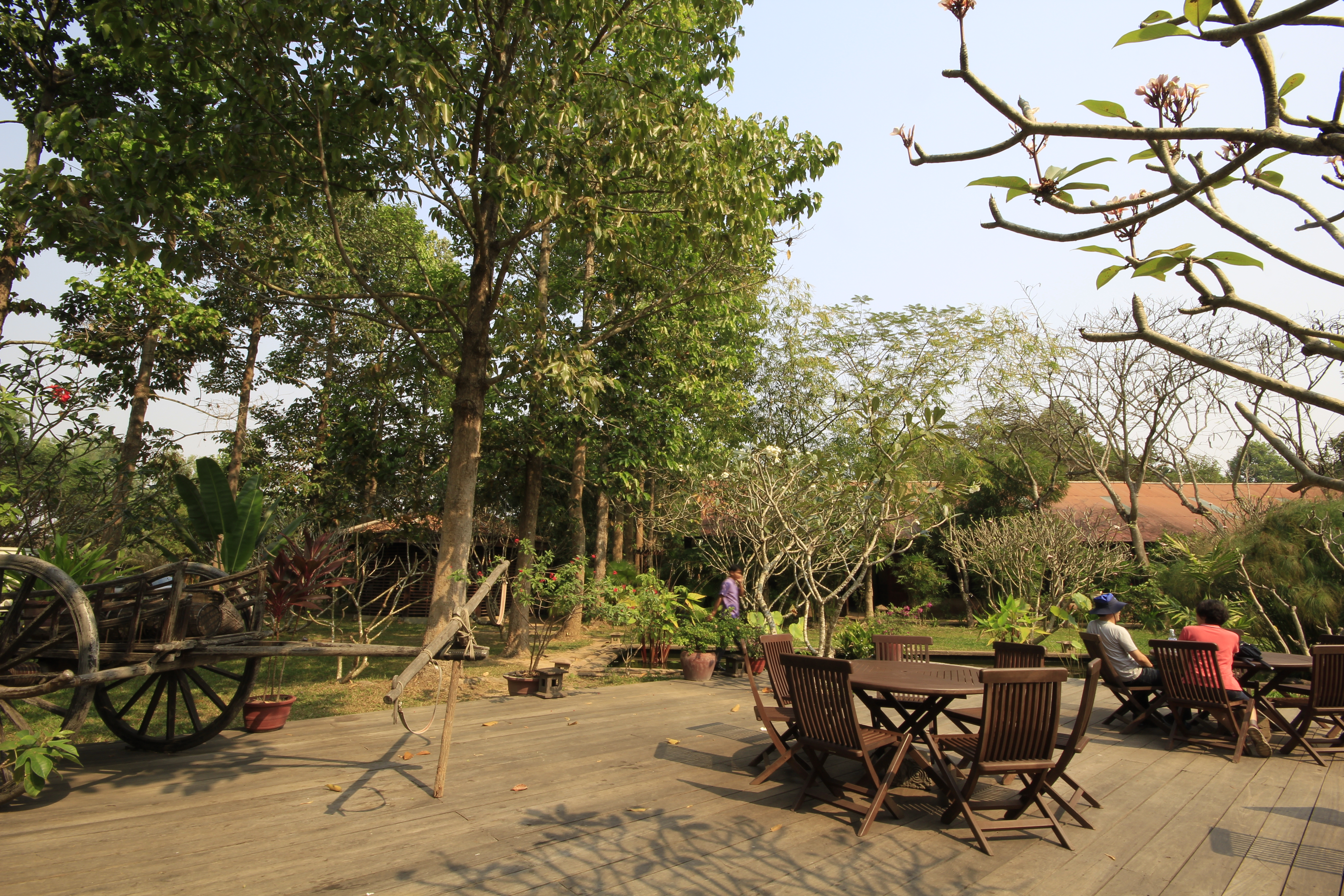
Angkor Silk Farm

Angkor Silk Farm was created by the National Silk Centre (Centre National de la Soie - CNS) in 1993. Between 1994 and 1996, the National Silk Centre developed and grew bigger.

While the National Silk Centre has focused on training silk farming to young Cambodian from remote rural areas, Artisans Angkor has provided these trainees with employment at the end of their formation. Indeed, there were few opportunities in this sector in the mid-1990s and Artisans Angkor was founded to become a vocational organism for people trained by the National Silk Centre. Therefore, CNS hosts Artisans Angkor at Angkor Silk Farm and both work closely together.

Since its creation, Artisans Angkor has opened 23 silk workshops in Siem Reap province, which makes it the largest employer in the region. Besides fulfilling a social mission, the enterprise is known as one of the finest silk producers in Cambodia and Angkor Silk Farm has been one of the attractions of Siem Reap for visitors interested in discovering the secrets of handmade silk production.

==== Silk-making process ====
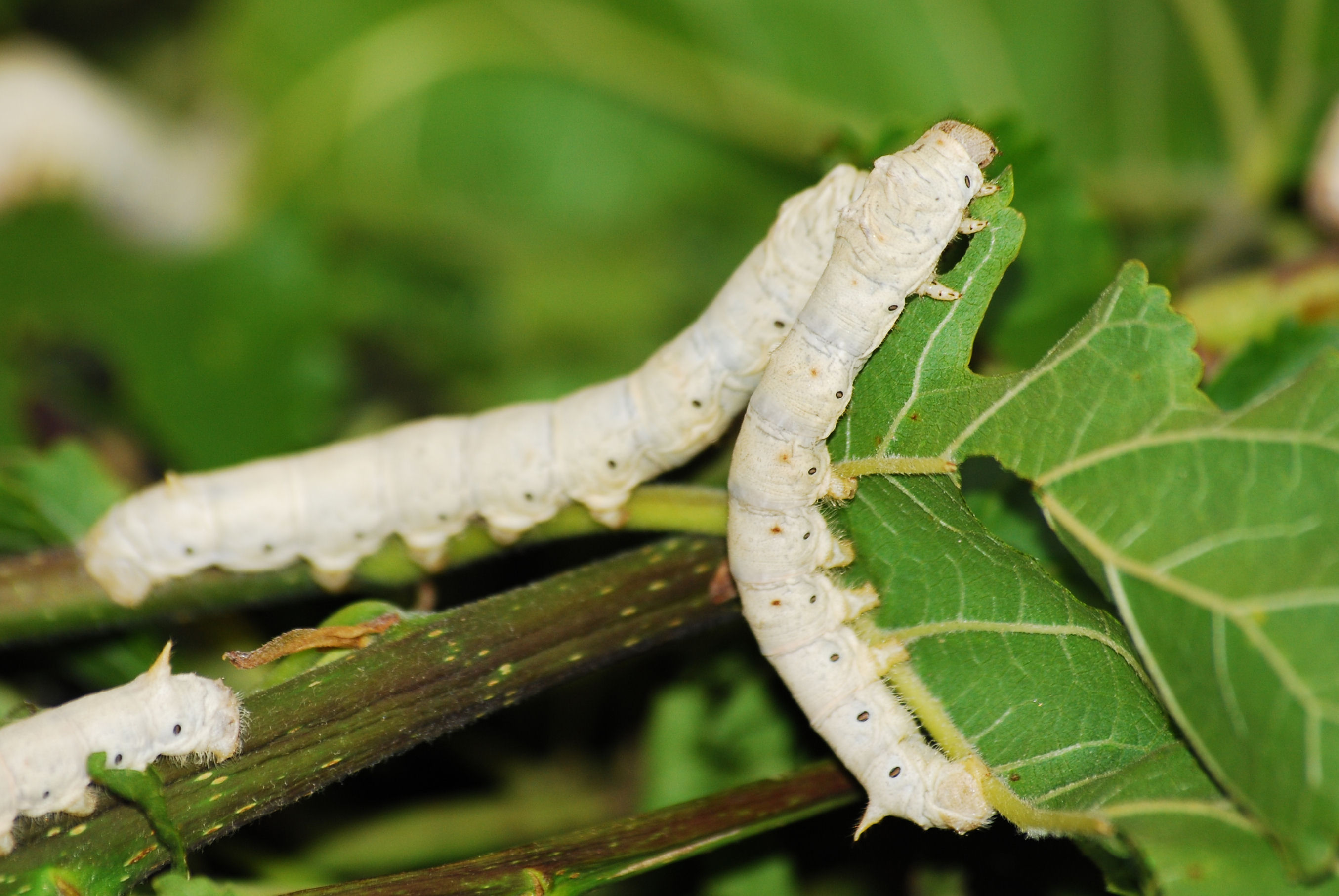
silkworm eating mulberry leaves

Angkor Silk Farm is surrounded by 5 hectares of mulberry trees plantation. These fields are the starting point of the whole process of silk-making as silk worms will eat and grow on them. The trees can grow two meters tall and branches are cut four times a year. Mulberry leaves are silkworms' favourite food and will be eaten for weeks. During the last days, silkworms can eat ten times a day.

When the worms have grown enough, they are put in baskets. From there, they will spin their cocoons in five days and will produce about three hundreds meters of silk each. The cocoons are then put in sunlight to avoid them undergoing their metamorphosis into mature moths. However, 20% of them reach the breeding process and the female moths will lay and hatch its eggs within nine to twelve days.

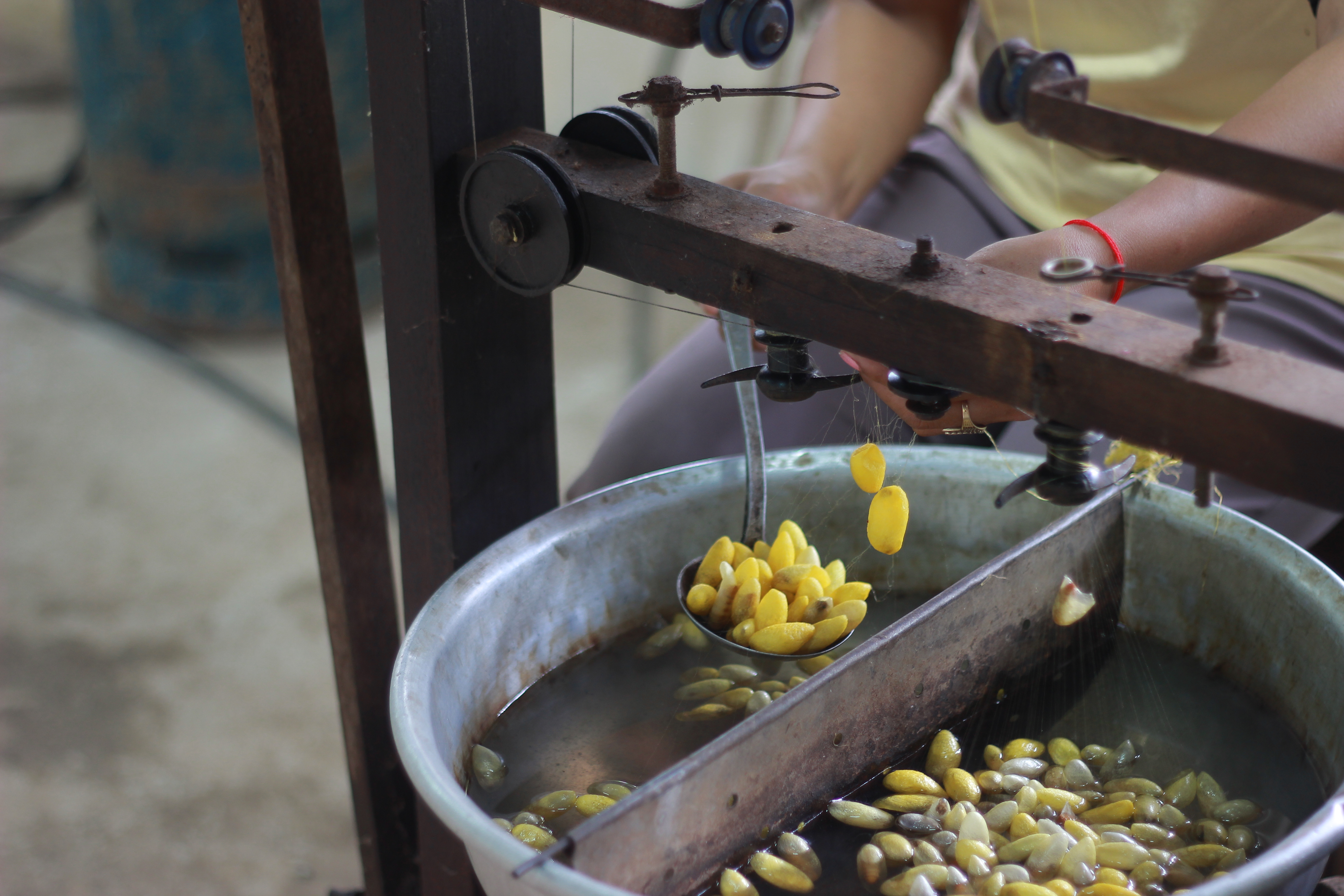
Woman degumming the silk

The cocoons are soaked in hot water in order to soften the sericin (also known as silk gum) which coat the fibres and stick the cocoons together. Silk threads are then unwound and reeled together to produce a single thread. Weavers at Angkor Silk Farm make both raw silk and fine silk that do not have the same texture at all. Sericin has not been completely removed from raw silk threads, which will give a rougher texture to the fabric at the end.

The silk is then dyed by putting natural materials or artificial and environmentally friendly dyes in boiling water. Natural dyes can be created out of bananas, coconut barks, leaves, roots, etc. but fruits and trees don't always have the same hues depending on the seasons which make the use of artificial products necessary to reach the same colour. The dyeing process has to be renewed several times as artisans weave silk fabrics in the old way through the Ikat technique.

==== The Ikat weaving technique ====
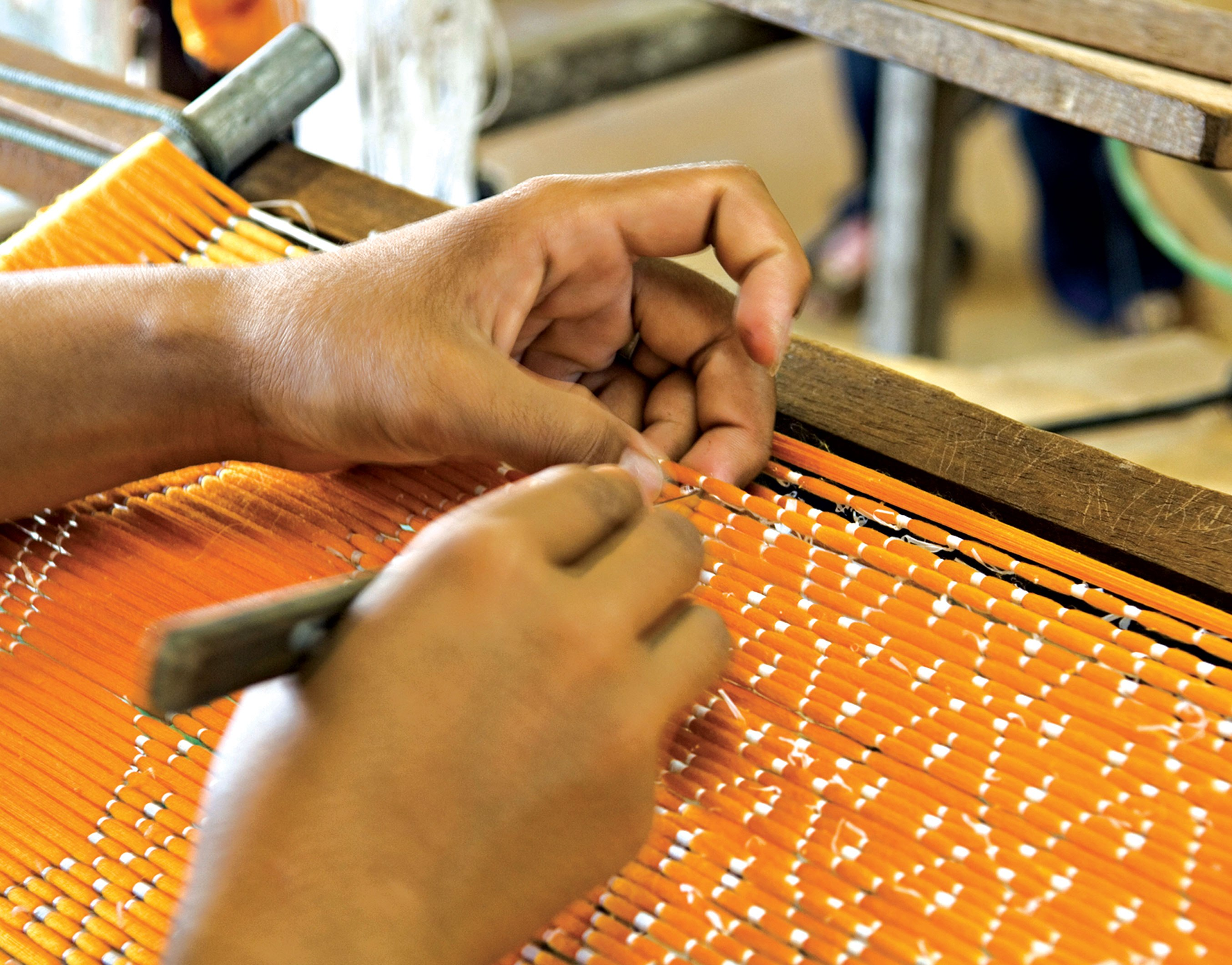
Artisan meticulously tightening-up knots to protect some parts from dyes. The process will create the pattern

The Ikat technique (also called "chong kiet" in Khmer) is one of the most ancient weaving techniques in the world and is used to create designs in fabrics. Artisans create a tight knot resistant to dyes which forms an original pattern with the complex intertwining of the warp thread and the weft thread.

One of the most famous and gorgeous kind of silk fabrics in Cambodia is called "Hol Lboeuk" and can only be created with the Ikat technique. Successive tying-in and dyeing process with different colours will yield the fabric geometric or floral motifs.

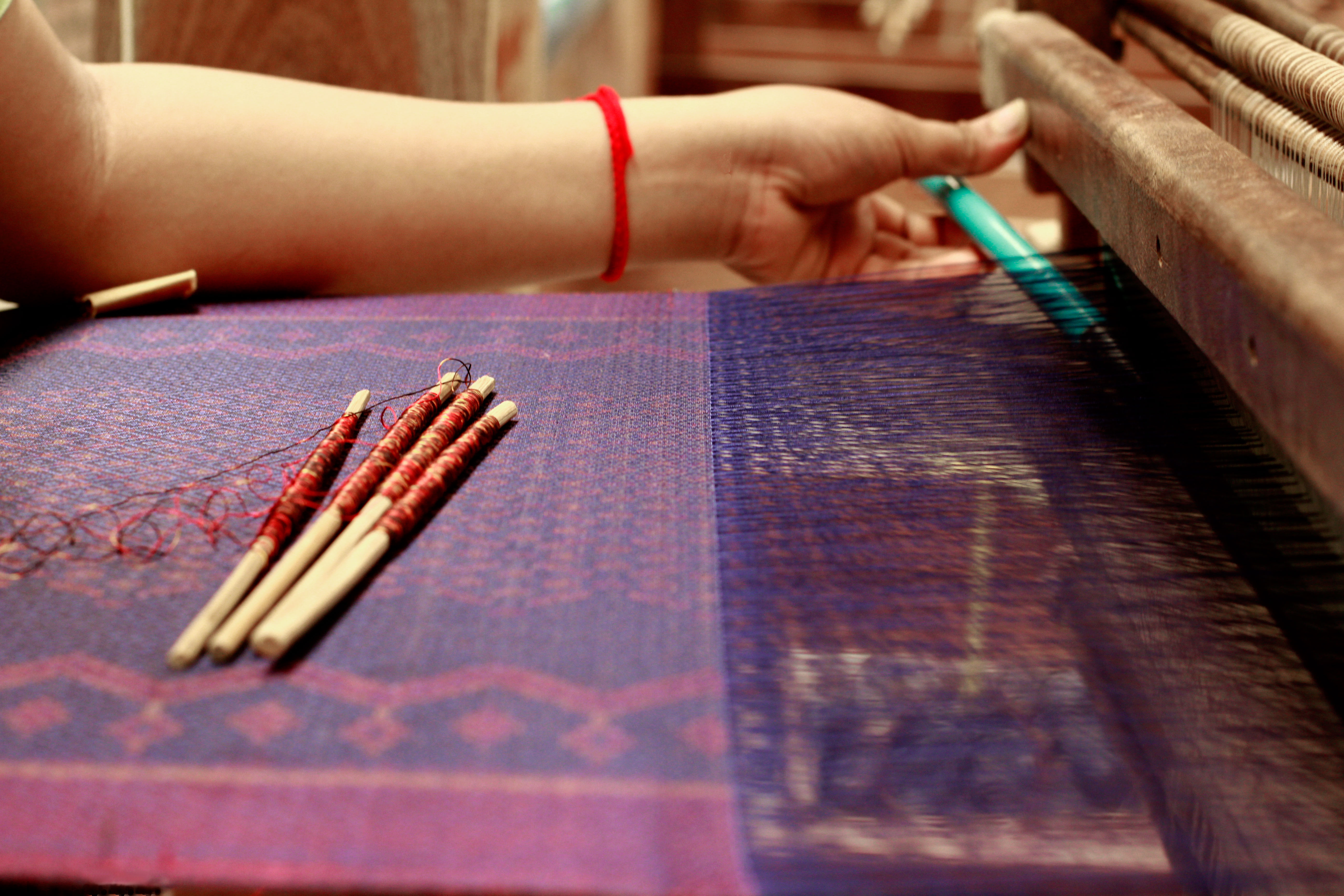
Traditional weaving techniques: the shuttle carries the weft threads from right to left to create special motifs on the fabric

The threads are then tied-up to a frame. The warp chain will individually pass through dents of the reed to be rolled up again on the cylinder placed in front of the loom. In the meantime, the weaver alternately pedal up and down on the levers to overhang the frame, and to provide the route for the shuttle that carries the weft threads to move from right to left. After each passage of the shuttle, the reed will join and tighten the threads together to make the full fabric. This lengthy and time-consuming process creates the desired pattern.

== Cambodian traditional crafts ==
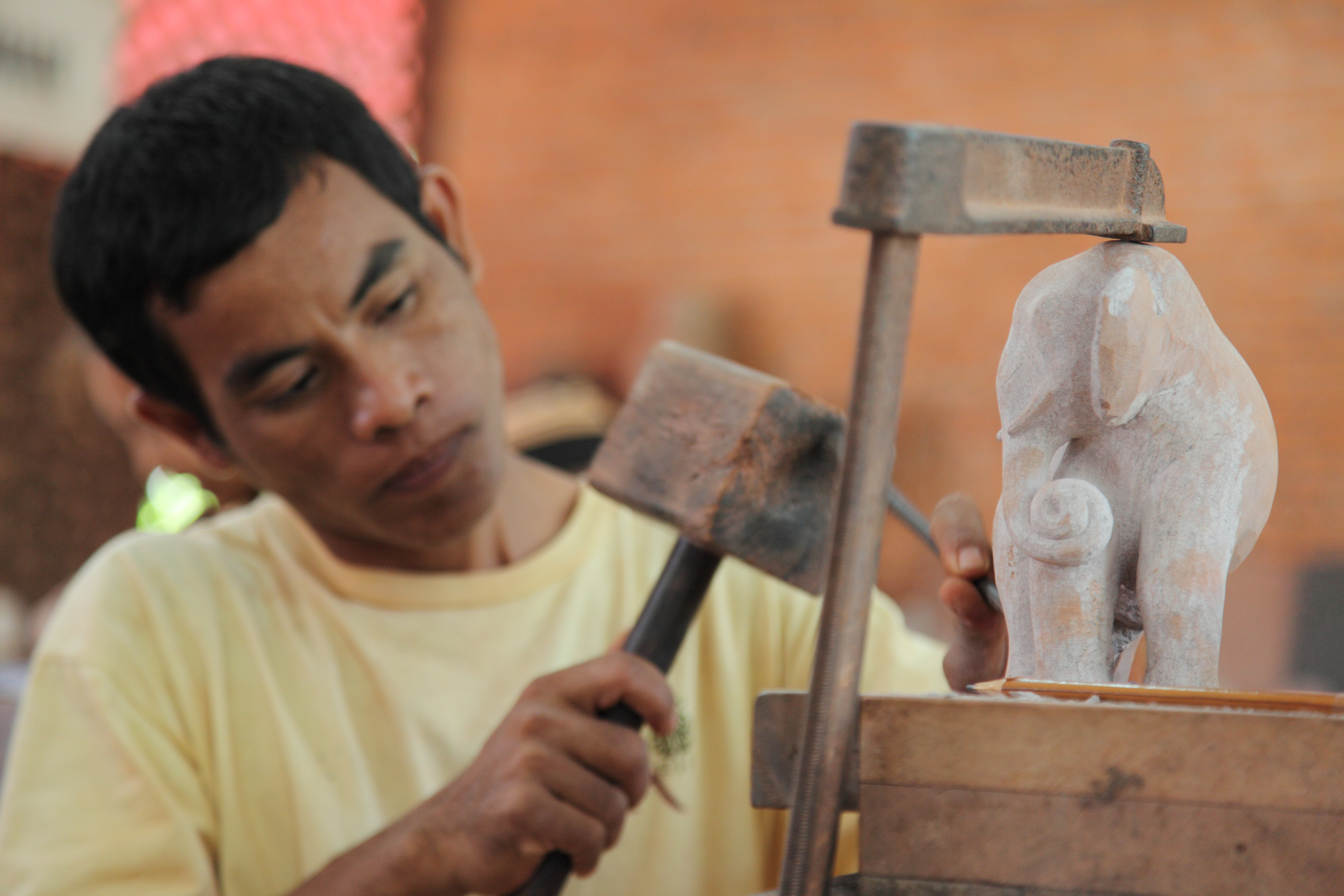
Craftsman carving a stone sculpture

Artisans Angkor had set up as a training centre in order to bring back ancient Arts and Crafts of the Angkor region. Stone and wood carvings are the skills which are mostly renowned in the Siem Reap region as they recall the nearby pagodas and Angkor temples with their famous bas-relief carvings. Most temples in the region of Angkor that were built in the 11th-12th centuries have such carvings. Statues often represent famous characters of the Buddhism or Hinduism mythologies such as Buddha, Shiva and Vishnu, etc.

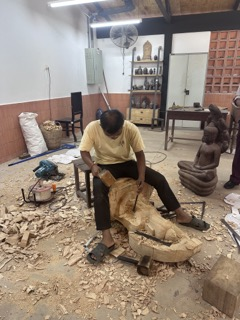
Craftsman Carving a Wooden Buddha Sculpture

For every craft, each artisan has its own way of working. If his/her movement is gentle rather than firm, the final piece will turn out to be slightly different from the other ones, which makes of each craft work a unique piece.

Artisans Angkor also masters the arts of polychrome and lacquering which have different processes depending on the medium used as a basis (wood or stone). Lacquerware and polychrome products are often gilded with copper or golden leaves.

For the silk painting, craftsmen set up the silk material on a frame, and then draw motifs of the artwork on the silk with tracing paper and a pad. Colours are finally put by hand on the silk and a painting brush is used to finish the work.

Silver plating had practically disappeared from Cambodia for a few centuries. Artisans Angkor decided in the mid-2000s to extend its skills to this handicraft. To make a silver-plated box, artisans shape upper and lower parts from pieces of thick copper. The upper part is cut following a matrix and is then pounded until it gets the required design. Same process applies for the lower part and the two pieces must fit perfectly together to create a box, which is then carved and decorated. Finally, the item is dipped into a silver bath which gives its shininess and silver aspect.

== Restoration of Angkor historical sites ==
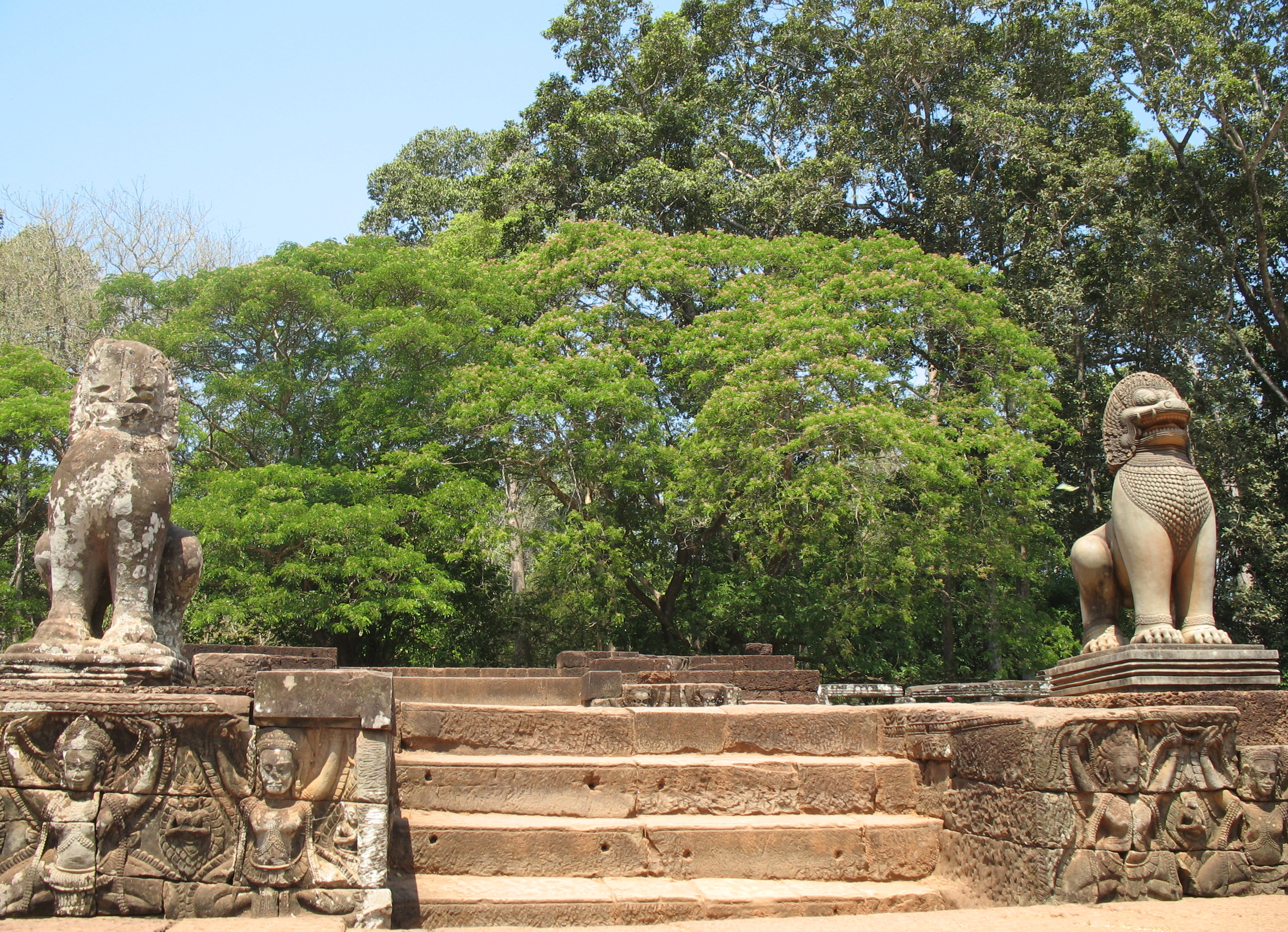
Two guardian lions at the Terrace of the Elephants in Angkor Thom, the one on the right was made by craftsmen from Artisans Angkor.

The Authority for the Protection and Management of Angkor and the Region of Siem Reap (also called "APSARA Authority") mandated Artisans Angkor to restore several parts of the historical Angkor site under the supervision of archeologists.

Local sculptors had to reproduce some parts of Kbal Spean's missing bas-relief carvings as well as the heads of Devas (gods) and Asuras (demons) located at the entrance of Angkor Thom South Gate. These are important characters of the popular legend of the Churning of the Ocean of Milk. Artisans Angkor also reproduced and installed three sandstone lions on the Terrace of the Elephants located in Angkor Thom.

This work contributes to the preservation of the World Heritage Site of Angkor which is visited by an increasing number of tourists – around two millions annually. This mass tourism is a threat to the temples foundations and reproducing some parts of the site is a way of preserving the original pieces.

== UNESCO Awards ==
Artisans Angkor won a few Awards of Excellence for Handicrafts in South and South-east Asia attributed by UNESCO as a stamp of approval which certifies that a handicraft product or product line "meets high standards of quality, innovating, cultural authenticity, as well as social and environmentally responsible production".

In 2005, the UNESCO-AHPADA (Asean Handicraft Promotion and Development Association) Seals of Excellence were awarded to the Deluxe Chorebap Scarf and the Salad Bowl Josa produced by Artisans Angkor.

In 2006, the UNESCO Seal of Excellence for handicrafts (South-east Asia program) was attributed to the Silk Sunset Shawl and the wooden Natural plate made by Artisans Angkor.

In 2008, the expert panel from UNESCO awarded two items made by Artisans Angkor, the wooden Candle Holder and the Krama PicnicTray, with the "Seal of Excellence for Handicrafts".

More recently in 2012, two new silk creations handmade by Artisans Angkor were awarded: the Elephant cushion cover and the Jungle Chic cushion cover.

A few months earlier, in August 2012, Artisans Angkor became a member of World Crafts Council (WCC) which is a non-governmental organization affiliated to UNESCO in a consultative status. With that participation, Artisans Angkor joins other craft organisations to promote and maintain craftsmanship traditions and legacies all over the world.

== See also ==
- Visual arts of Cambodia
- Living at the embrace of Arunachala
