= Neav Sithong =

Cambodian politician

Neav Sithong is a Cambodian politician. He was the minister of justice for Cambodia from 2001 to 2004. He replaced Uk Vithun.
