= Ponn Vongs Vaddey =

Cambodian politician

Ponn Vongs Vaddey is the former minister of justice for Cambodia.
