= Terrace of the Elephants =

Archaeological site in Angkor, Cambodia

Coordinates: 13°26′45″N 103°51′31″E

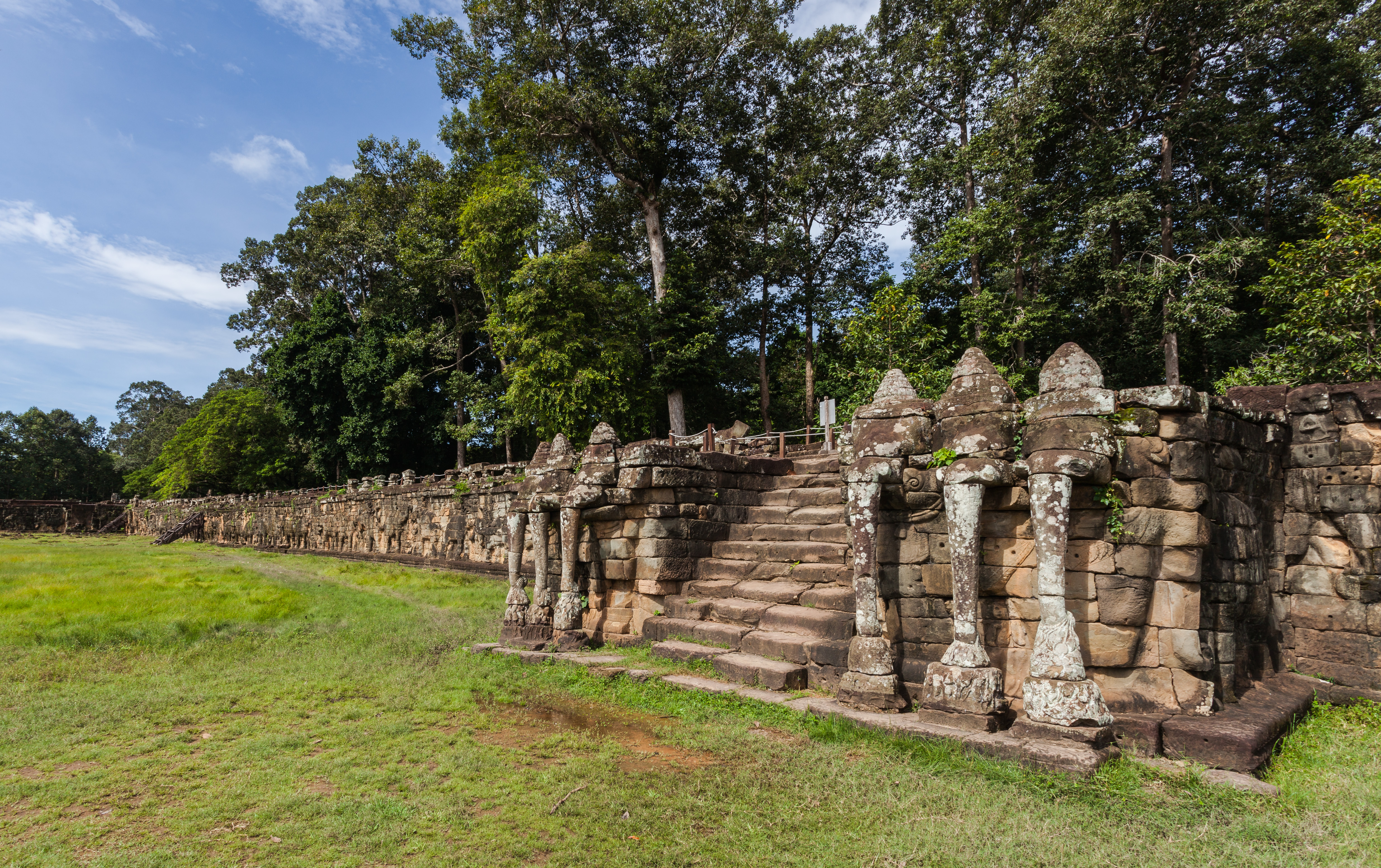
The Terrace of Elephants, Angkor, Cambodia.

The Terrace of the Elephants (Khmer: ព្រះលានជល់ដំរី) is part of the walled city of Angkor Thom, a ruined temple complex in Cambodia.

== Description ==
The terrace was used by Angkor's king Jayavarman VII as a platform from which to view his victorious returning army. It was attached to the palace of Phimeanakas (Khmer: ប្រាសាទភិមានអាកាស), of which only a few ruins remain. Most of the original structure was made of organic material and has long since disappeared. Most of what remains are the foundation platforms of the complex. The terrace is named for the carvings of elephants on its eastern face.

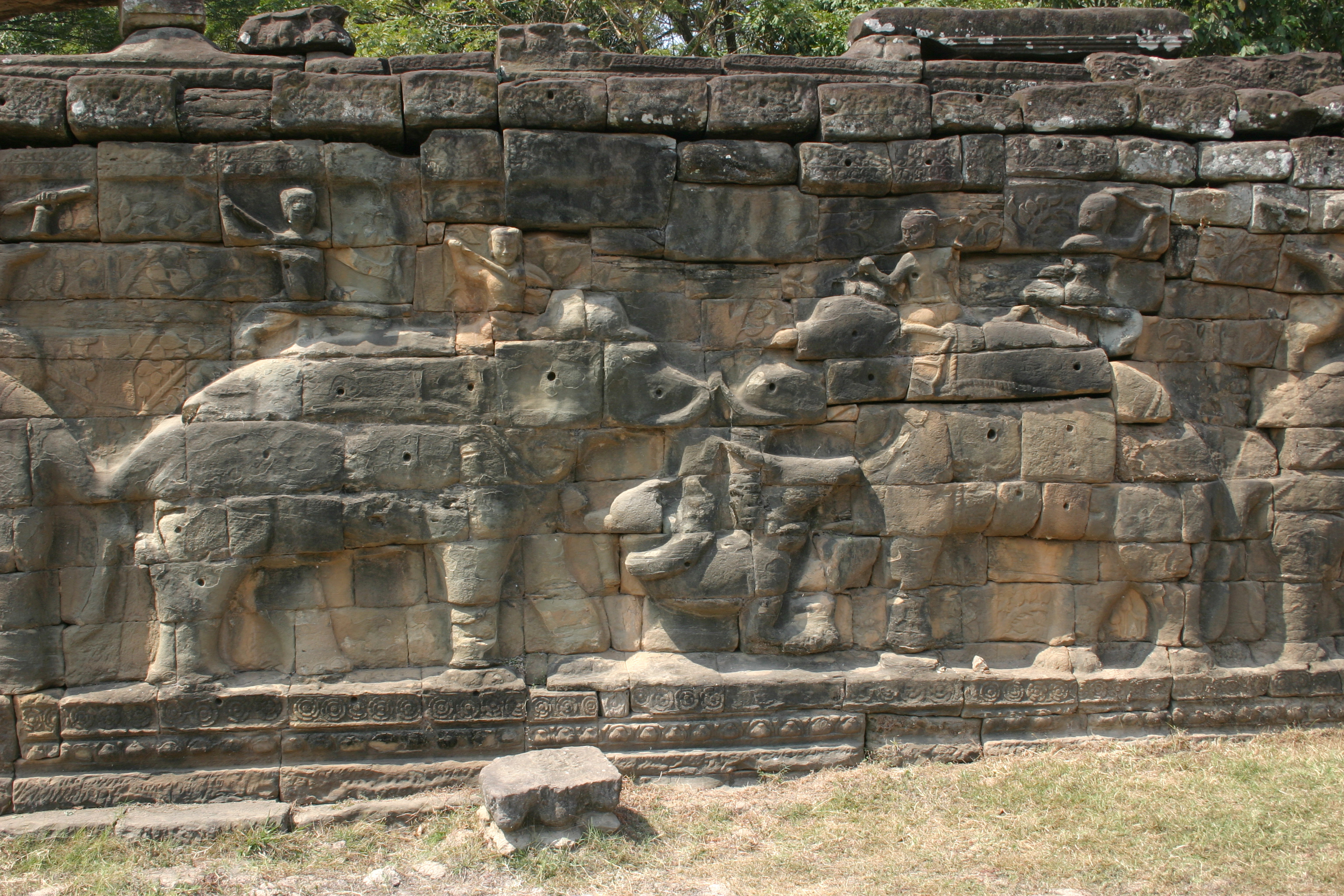
Bas-relief in the Terrace of the Elephants

The 350 meter-long Terrace of Elephants was used as a giant reviewing stand for public ceremonies and served as a base for the king's grand audience hall. It has five outworks extending towards the Central Square: three in the centre and one at each end. The middle section of the retaining wall is decorated with life size garuda and lions; towards either end are the two parts of the famous parade of elephants complete with their Khmer mahouts.
