= Pierre Bobot =

French painter and laquerer

- Born: 16 February 1902; Paris, France
- Died: 23 August 1974; Avranches, France

Pierre Bobot, born Pierre Robert Serge Bobot (French: [pjɛʁ bɔbo]; 16 February 1902 – 23 August 1974), was a French painter and lacquer artist.

== Biography ==
Pierre Bobot was born in Paris and died in Avranches. He exhibited at the Salon d'hiver from 1936 to 1950. He was the father of Marie-Thérèse Bobot (1929–2011), curator at the Cernuschi Museum (Musée Cernuschi) and professor at the École du Louvre.
