= Kbal Spean =

- ក្បាលស្ពាន
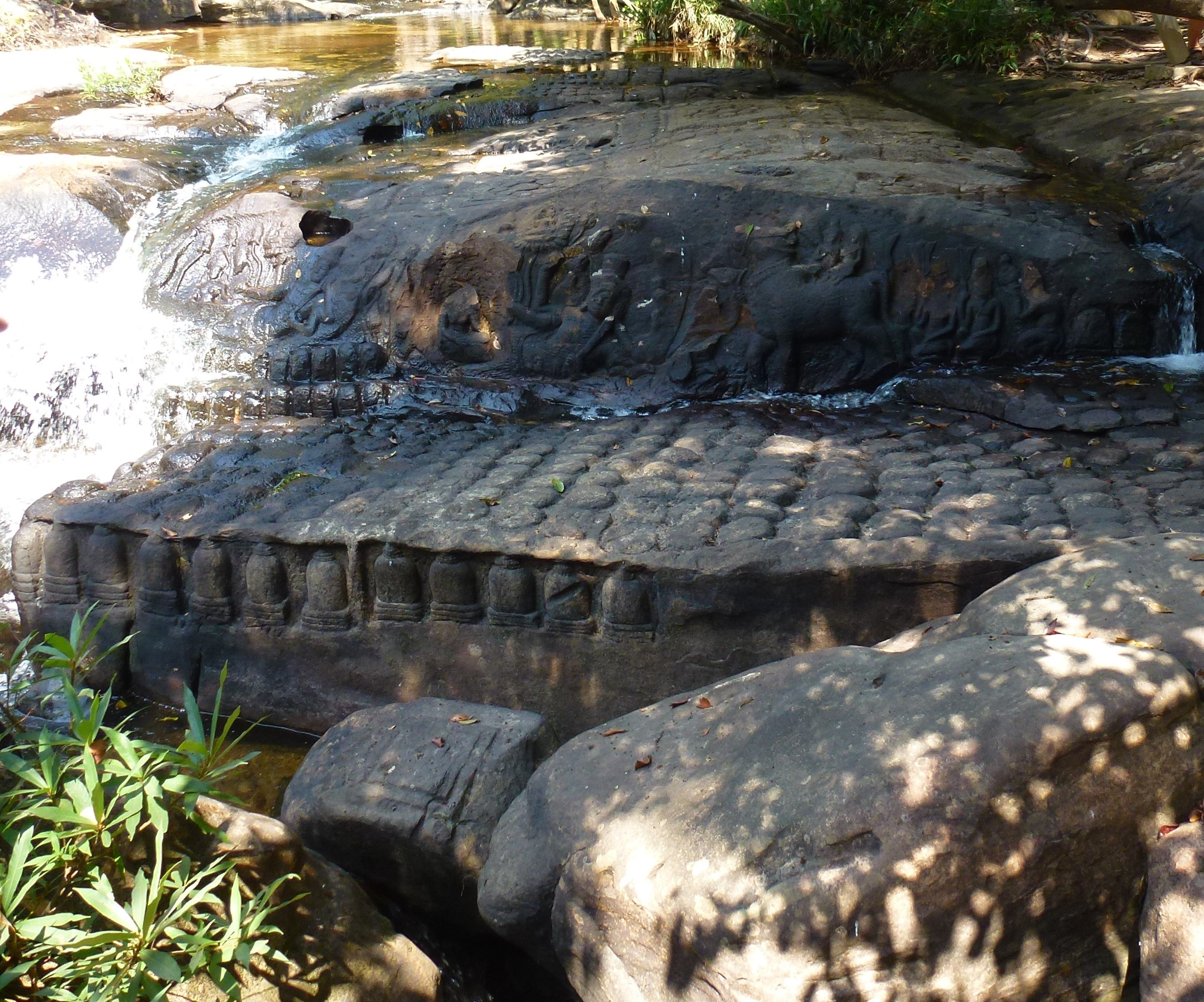
- Lingas and sculptures of Hindu gods and waterfall at Kbal Spean

- Location in Cambodia

Religion
- Affiliation: Hinduism
- District: Siem Reap
- Province: Siem Reap
- Deity: Shiva and Vishnu

Location
- Location: Angkor
- Country: Cambodia
- Coordinates: 13°42′30.1″N 104°1′32.1″E

Architecture
- Type: Bapuon architecture
- Creator: King Suryavarman I and King Udayadityavarman II
- Completed: 11th to 12th centuries
- Monument: One

Kbal Spean (Khmer: ក្បាលស្ពាន, Kbal Spéan [kɓaːl spiən]; lit. 'Bridge Head') is an Angkorian-era archaeological site on the southwest slopes of the Kulen Hills to the northeast of Angkor in Banteay Srei District, Siem Reap Province, Cambodia. It is situated along a 150m stretch of the Stung Kbal Spean River, 25 kilometres (16 mi) from the main Angkor group of monuments, which lie downstream.

The site consists of a series of stone rock relief carvings in sandstone formations of the river bed and banks. It is commonly known as the "Valley of a 1000 Lingas" or "The River of a Thousand Lingas". The motifs for stone carvings are mainly myriads of lingams (phallic symbol of Hindu god Shiva), depicted as neatly arranged bumps that cover the surface of a sandstone bed rock, and lingam-yoni designs. There are also various Hindu mythological motifs, including depictions of the gods Shiva, Vishnu, Brahma, Lakshmi, Rama, and Hanuman, as well as animals (cows and frogs).

== Geography ==
Kbal Spean is described as "a spectacularly carved riverbed, set deep in the jungle to the northeast of Angkor". The river over which the bridge head exists is also known as Stung Kbal Spean, a tributary of the Siem Reap River that rises in the Kulein mountains north of Banteay Srei. The river bed cuts through sandstone formations, and the many architectural sculptures of Hindu mythology have been carved within the sandstone. The archaeological site occurs in a stretch of the river starting from 150 metres (490 ft) upstream north of the bridge head to the falls downstream. The river, being sanctified by flowing over the religious sculptures, flows downstream, bifurcating into the Siem Reap River and Puok River, which eventually flows into the Tonlé Sap Lake after passing through the plains and the Angkor temple complex.

The archaeological site is in the western part of the Kulein mountains within the Phnom Kulen National Park. Approach is from the Banteay Srei temple by a road which is about 5 kilometres (3.1 mi) from an army camp. Thereafter, it is a 40-minute walk through the forest for about 2 kilometres (1.2 mi) uphill along a path before reaching the first site, a water fall, where the carved sculptures start appearing in the river bed.

== History ==
The carving of vestiges began with the reign of King Suryavarman I and ended with the reign of King Udayadityavarman II; these two kings ruled between the 11th and 12th centuries. The 1,000 lingas, but not other sculptures, are attributed to a minister of Suryavarman I during the 11th century, and these were carved by hermits who lived in the area. Inscriptions at the site testify to the fact that most of the sculpting was done during the reign of Udayadityavarman II. It is also mentioned that King Udayadityavarman II consecrated a golden ling here in 1059 AD. It is believed that the Siem Reap River flowing into Angkor is blessed by the sacred lingas over which it flows.

The archaeological site was discovered in 1969 by Jean Boulbet, an ethnologist, but further exploration was cut off due to the Cambodian Civil War. The site regained prominence for safe visits from 1989.

== Layout ==
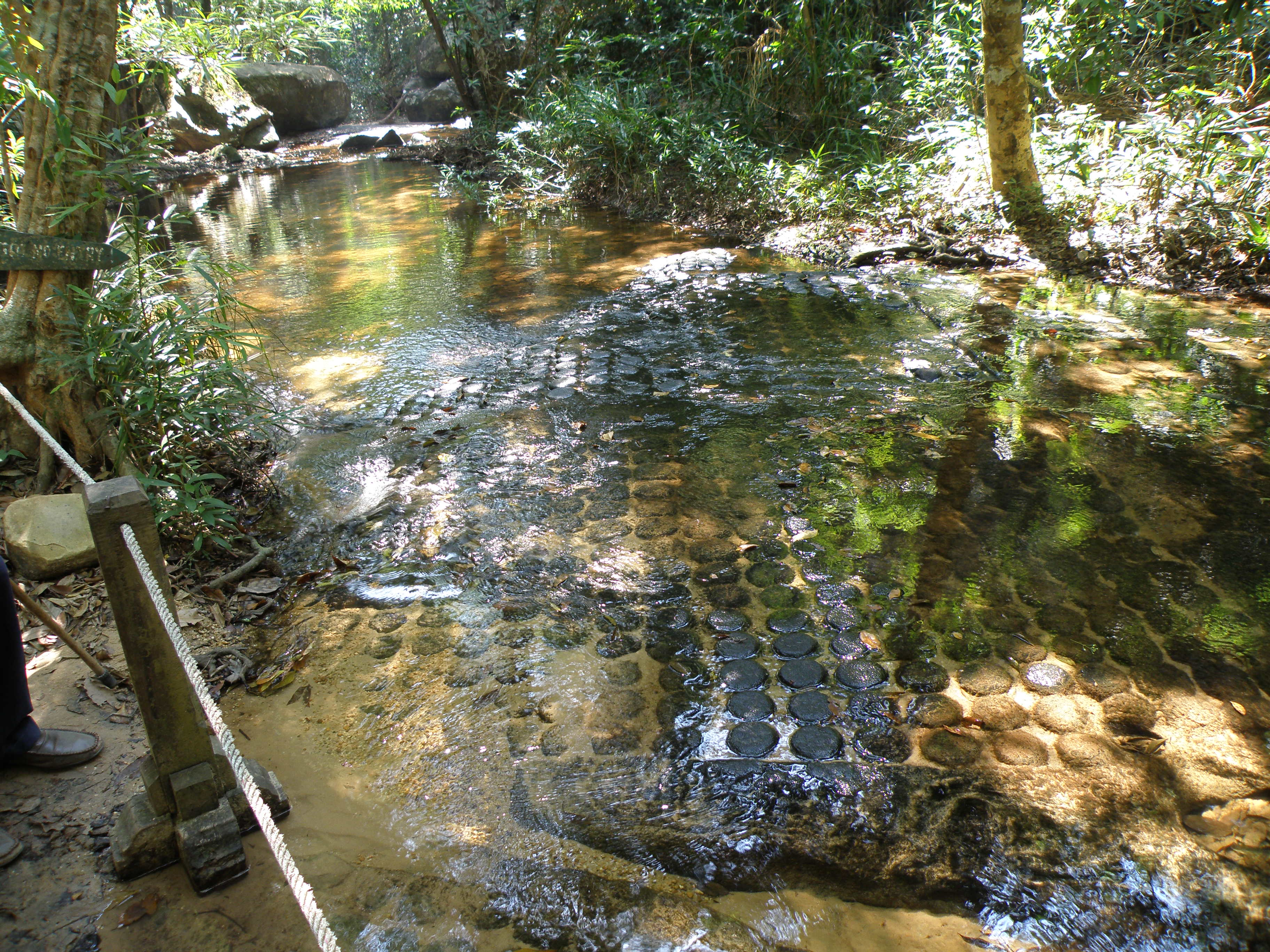
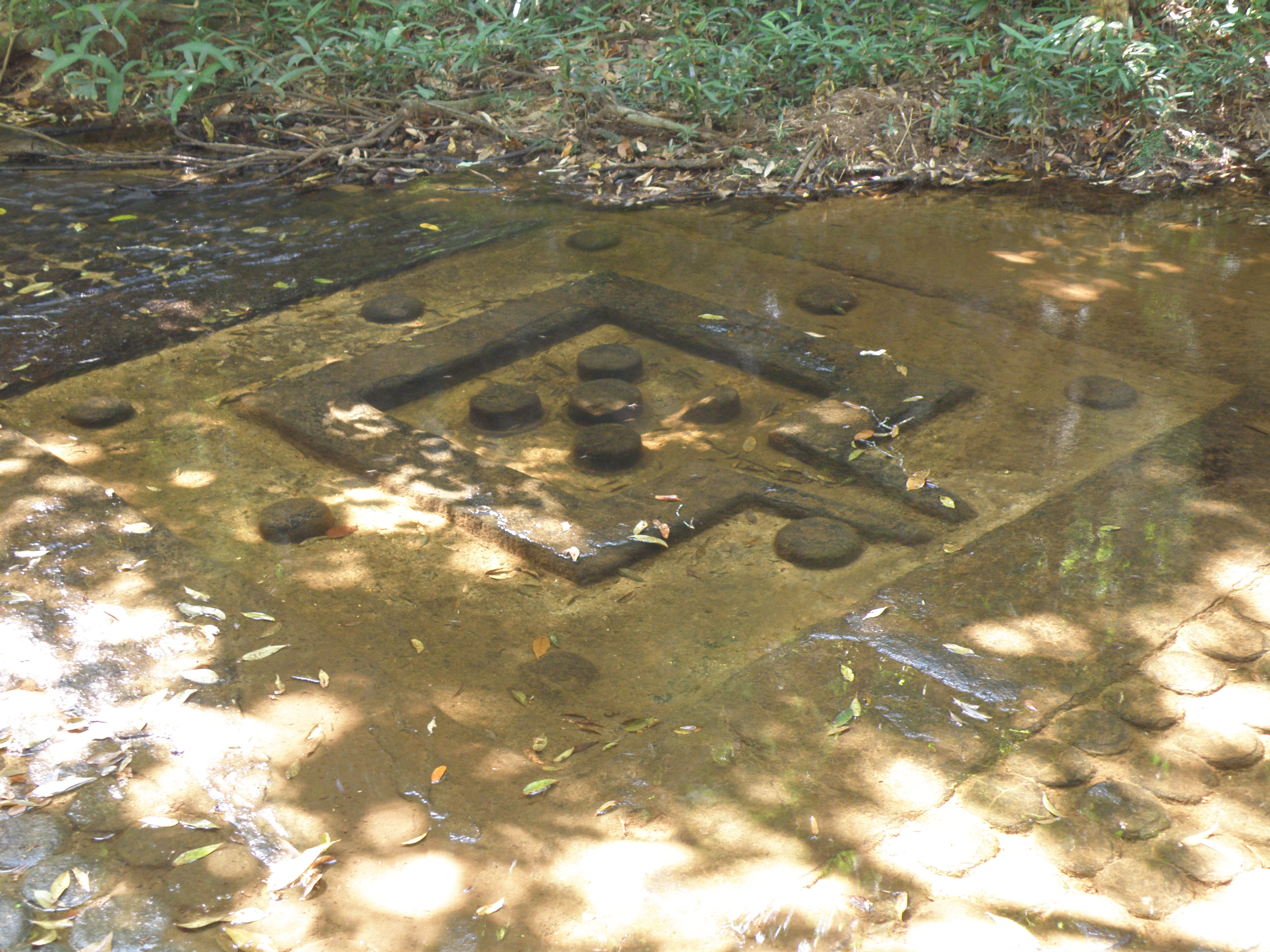
Left: Sahasralingas or 1000 lingas in the rocky bed of Kbal Spean River. Right: A grid pattern layout with the channel flowing out representing Yoni

The bridge is a natural sandstone arch 50 kilometres (31 mi) northeast of Siem Reap River. Just after the monsoon season, when the water level in the river starts dropping, the carvings are visible in a 150 metres (490 ft) stretch upstream of the bridge and from the bridge downstream up to the falls. The 11th century carvings in this stretch of the river are a galaxy of gods, the trinity of Brahma, Vishnu and Shiva or Maheswara and celestial beings; several carvings of Vishnu with Lakshmi reclining on the serpent Ananta, Shiva with consort Uma, known as Umamaheswar Brahma on a lotus petal over a plant stem rising from the navel of Vishnu, Rama and Hanuman are the sculptures seen not only in the river bed but also on the river banks.

Sequentially, while walking along a path which skirts the eroded channel of the river-formed natural stone bridge, one can see a pair of Vishnu sculptures with Lakshmi seated at his feet in a reclining pose. Upstream of the bridge, there is a sculpture of Shiva and Uma mounted on the bull. Approximately 30 metres (98 ft) downstream of the bridge, there are additional Vishnu sculptures. Further downstream up to the water fall and till the water pool are the Sahasra lingas in Sanskrit language with English equivalent name of "Thousand Lingas". The sculpted lingams in the coarse sandstone river bed outcrops are seen from about 6 metres (20 ft) downstream of the bridge. According to the journalist Teppo Tukki of Phnom Penh Post who visited the site in 1995, the lingams, some of which date back to the 9th century, are about 25 centimetres (9.8 in) square and 10 centimetres (3.9 in) deep and lined in a perfect grid pattern. The river runs over them, covering them with 5 centimetres (2.0 in) of pristine water. The holy objects are designed to create a "power path for the Khmer Kings".

After the carvings, the river falls by 15 centimetres (5.9 in) to a clear water pool. As it flows over the holy lingams, the river attains a sanctified status and passes through the temples that are downstream. The visible lingams are in a rectangular enclosure with a channel flowing out, which is interpreted to represent the yoni as the "female principle". Beyond these lingams, the river stretch of about 40–50 metres (130–160 ft) includes a small rocky island and ends over a fall into a pool. In this stretch of the river, there are bas reliefs on the rock faces. It has been inferred that one of the bas reliefs in this stretch, the central figure, unrecognizably damaged, could be that of Shiva as an ascetic, similar to the bas relief seen in Angkor Wat temple. The meaning of the crocodile carving seen here has not been ascertained. Near to this location, a boulder has been carved as a frog. The pond, in a rectangular shape, filled with water at all times, has many "Reclining Vishnu" carvings on the walls, and here again, a pair of crocodiles are carved but with their tail held by women. The small island formed in this stretch of the river has carvings of Shiva and Uma mounted on a bull.

== Sculptures ==
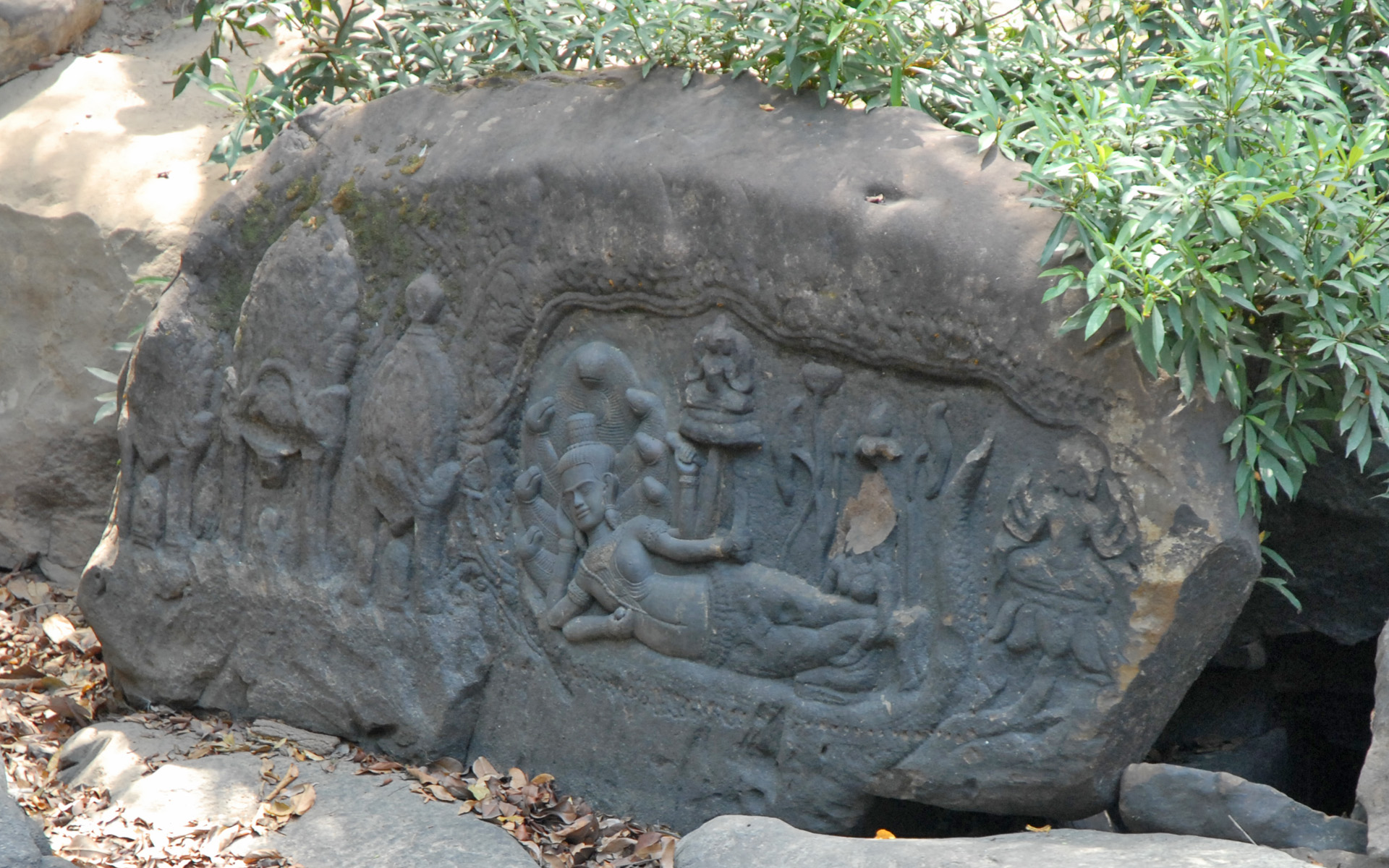
Lord Vishnu in a reclining repose lying on the serpent god Ananta, with Goddess Lakshmi at his feet and Lord Brahma on a lotus petal, in Kbal Spean River bank

The sculptures carved in the river bed and banks depict many Hindu mythological scenes and symbols. There are also inscriptions which get exposed as the water level in the river decreases. The common theme of these sculptures emphasizes creation as defined in Hindu mythology in the form of Lord Vishnu lying on a serpent in a reclining repose on the ocean of milk in meditation, the lotus flower emerging from Vishnu’s navel which bears god Brahma, the creator. Following these sculptures seen carved on the banks of the river, the river flows through several sculpted reliefs of Shiva the destroyer shown in the universal symbol of the Linga; 1000 such lingas have been carved in the bed of the river which gives the name to the river valley formed by the river as "valley of 1000 lingas". Vishnu is also carved to match the contours of the river bed and banks. A carving of Shiva with his consort Uma is also visible.

Though the sculptures have been vandalized and damaged, the carved idols still retain their original grandeur. Under the supervision of archaeologists, the graduates of Artisans d'Angkor have been able to reproduce some portions of Kbal Spean's missing bas-relief carvings.

== Biodiversity ==
Also situated within the Phnom Kulen National Park, and close to the river outfall, is the Angkor Centre for Conservation of Biodiversity where "trafficked animals are nursed back to health".

== Gallery ==
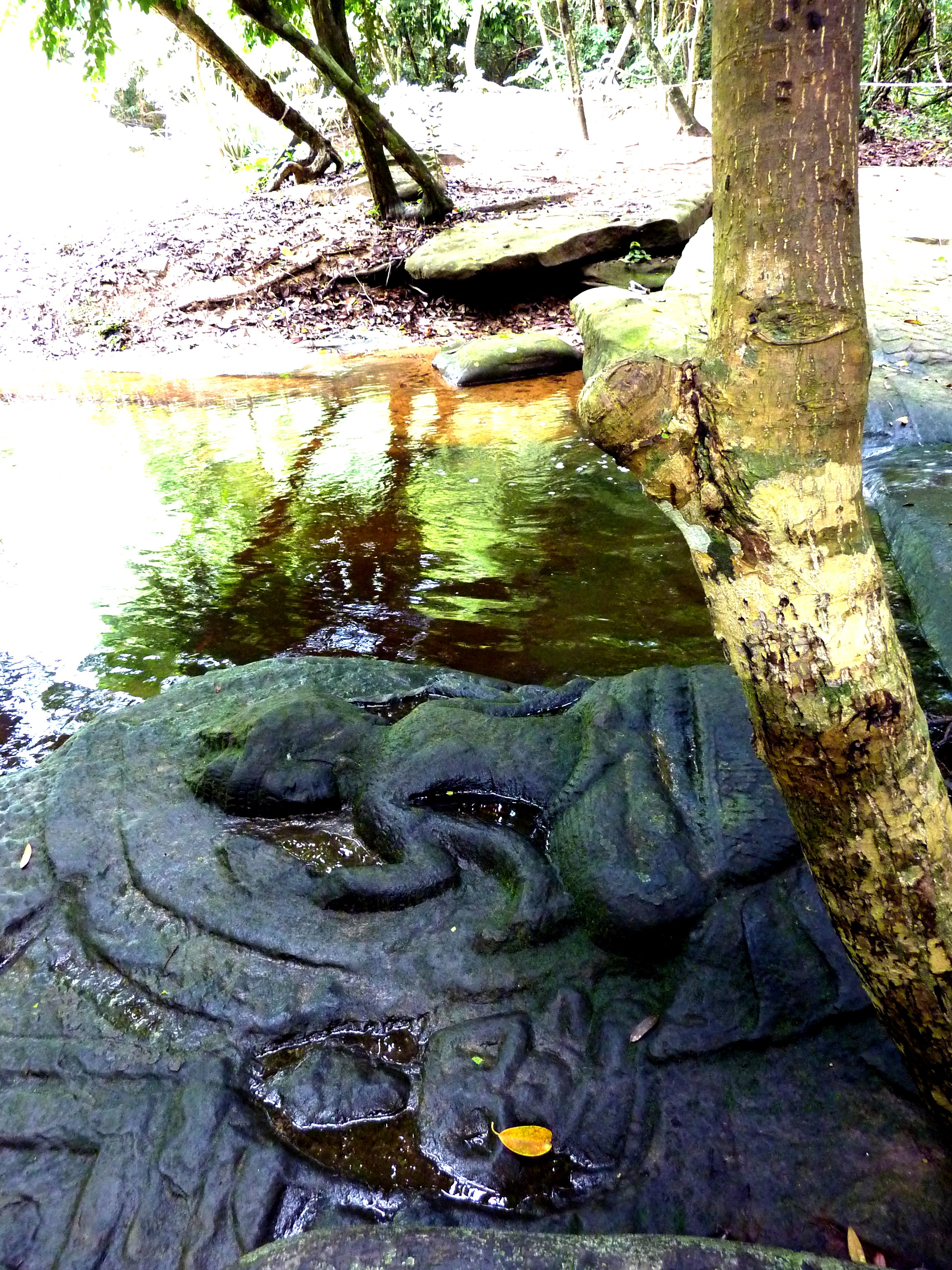
Brahma in the river bed

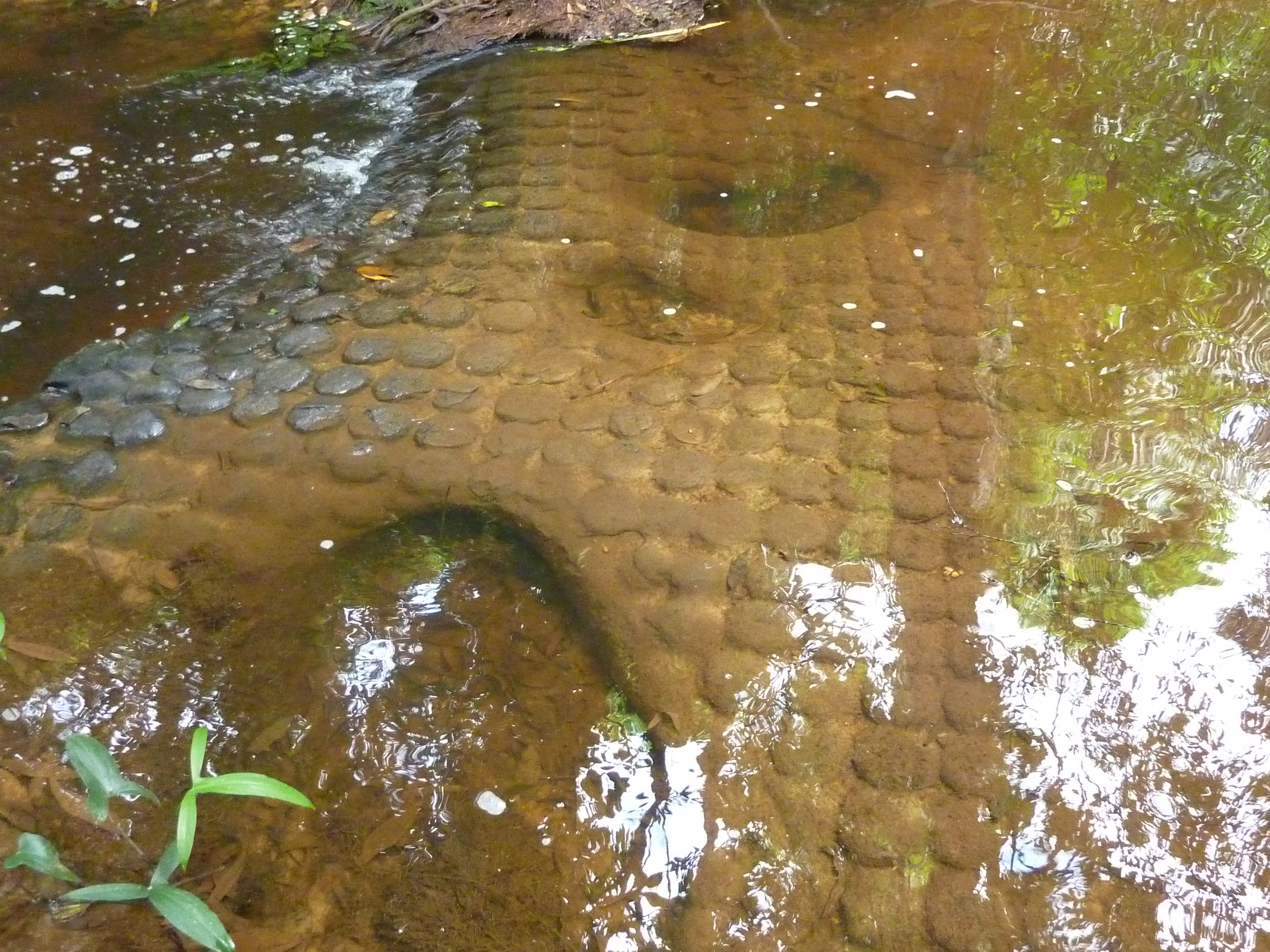
Lingas under water

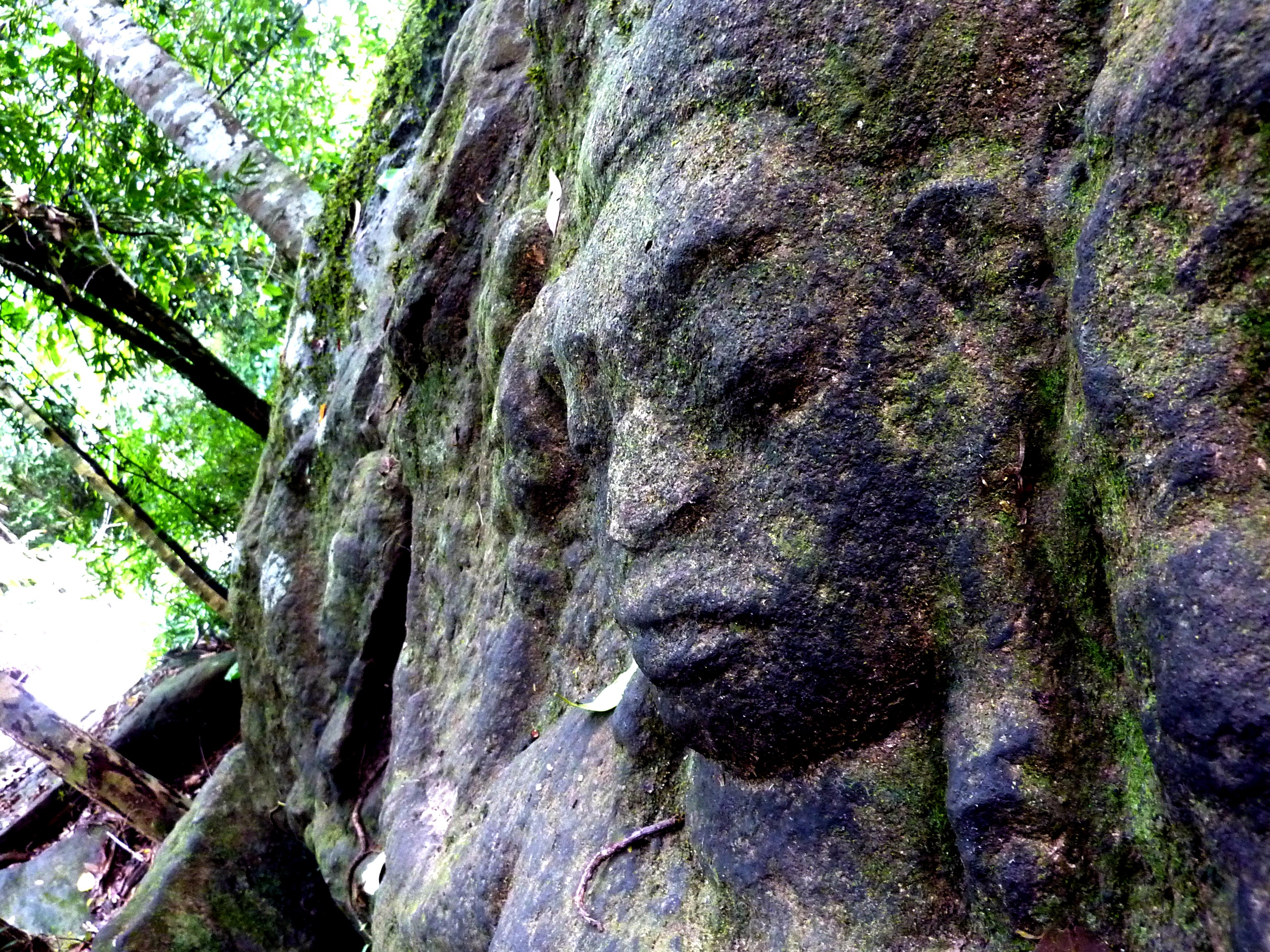

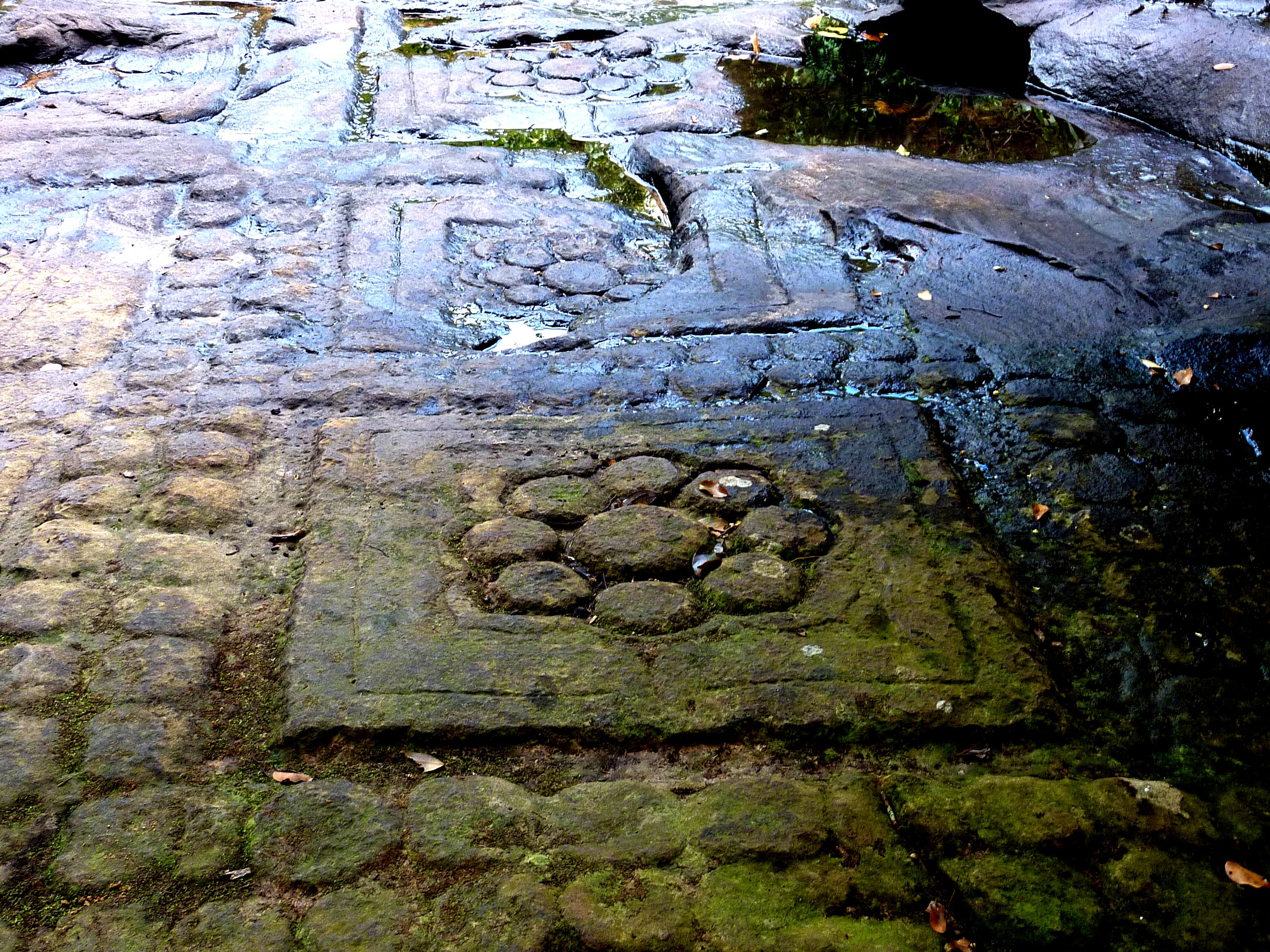
Lotuses

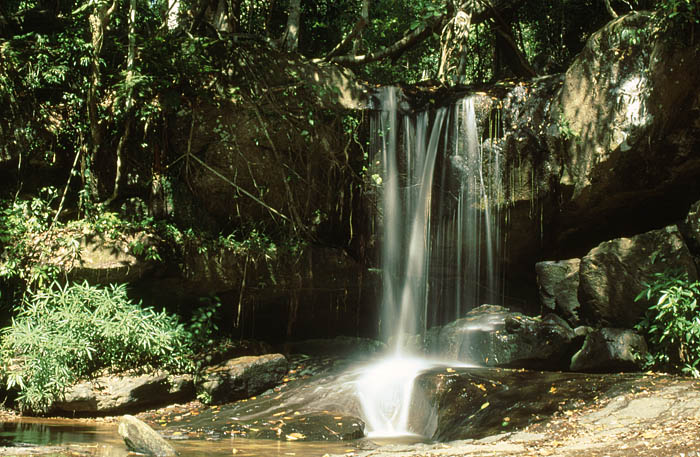

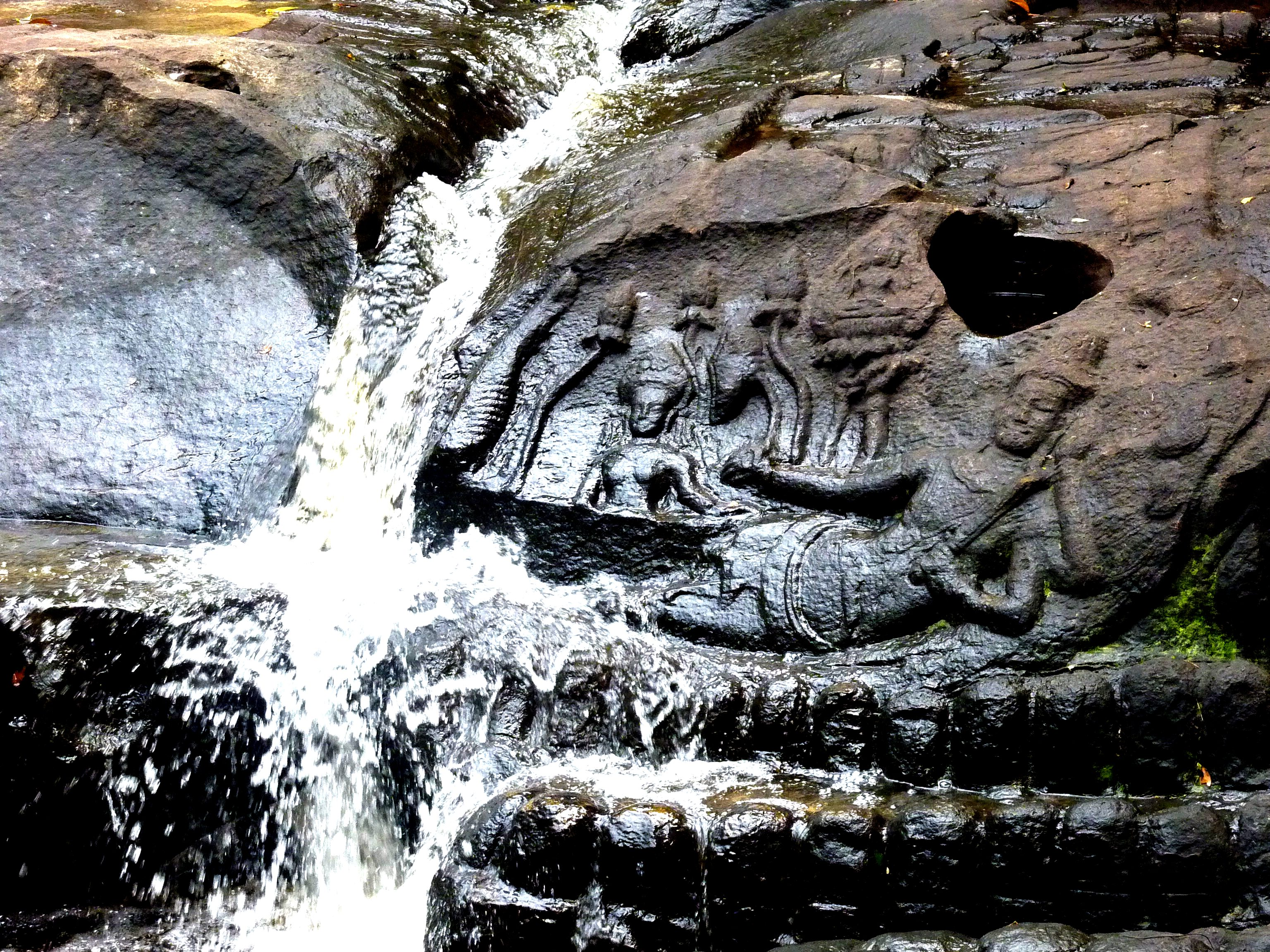
Vishnu and Lakshmi
