= Angkor Village Apsara Theatre =

Theater and dance hall in Siem Reap, Cambodia

Apsara Theatre
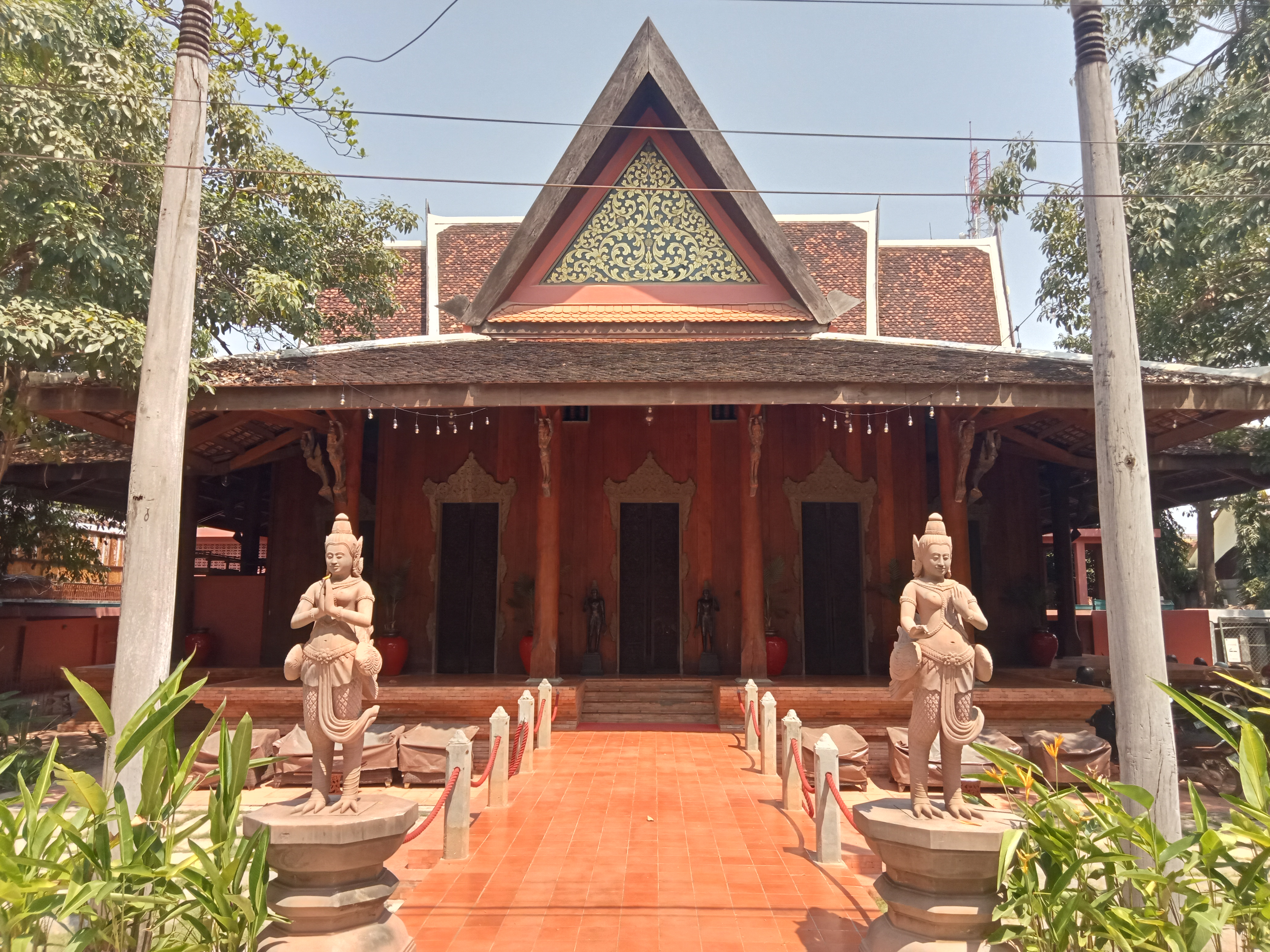
- Interactive map of Apsara Theatre
- Full name: Angkor Village Apsara Theatre
- Address: Street 26, Wat Bo Road; Siem Reap; Cambodia
- Location: opposite the Angkor Village Hotel
- Coordinates: 13.3538705°N 103.8593364982°E
- Operator: David Piot

Construction
- Built: 1997
- Opened: 1 January 1997
- Architect: Olivier Piot

Website
- Official website

The Apsara Theater is Siem Reap’s oldest Theatre, opened 1997 opposite the Angkor Village Hotel, with the revival of the royal Angkorian Apsara dance, Reamker (Ramayana), and other Khmer Traditional Dances like Apsara Ballet and the stories of workers life, like the fishermen's dance. This unique dance style was once reserved only for the royal family and their honoured guests to admire.

== See also ==
- Dance in Cambodia
