= Angkor Village Hotel =

Hotel in Cambodia

Coordinates: 13°21′13.8″N 103°51′32.0″E

- Interactive map of the Angkor Village Hotel area

General information
- Classification: Hotel
- Location: Street 26, Wat Bo Road, Siem Reap, Cambodia
- Construction started: 1994
- Opened: 1994
- Renovated: 2013
- Operator: David Piot

Technical details
- Floor count: 2

Design and construction
- Architects: Olivier Piot, Vattho Tep

Renovating team
- Awards: Small Luxury Hotels of the World

Other information
- Number of restaurants: 1
- Number of bars: 1
- Facilities: Boutique, Wellness and spa centre

Angkor Village Hotel is a hotel in the central Old French Colonial Quarters of Wat Bo district in Siem Reap, Cambodia. It was opened in 1994, is classified as member of Small Luxury Hotels of the World, and offers swimming pool, the a la carte restaurant L’Auberge des Temples, Siem Reaps oldest theater, the Angkor Village Apsara Theatre, and wellness options as a spa centre.

The hotel is located on Street 26 and Wat Bo Road, overlooking the Siem Reap River and is adjacent to the Psar Chas area with Old Market and Pub Street.

== History ==
The hotel was built and opened as a private owned enterprise in 1994 by two architects. They made their hotel a homage to traditional architecture and Khmer hospitality, and during the post period of the Cambodian Civil War, the hotel was a safe haven for journalists, UN personnel, diplomats, and courageous travellers.

== Architecture ==
Authentic Khmer architecture of wooden bungalows with Lotus ponds and temple-like design in a blend of history and modernity.

== Awards ==
Angkor Village Hotel is a member of Small Luxury Hotels of the World since the beginning of 2020.
