= Kulen Elephant Forest =

Cambodian Organisation on conserving and protecting Elephants

- Founded: 2018
- Founder: David Piot
- Type: Organisation
- Purpose: Asian elephant conservation
- Location: Siem Reap, Cambodia
- Method: Species conservation, protection of forest, Environmental Education, Ecotourism
- Owner: David Piot
- Key people: Oan Kiry, general director. Dan Koehl, elephant welfare director and advisory expert.
- Award: silver-level certification from Asian Captive Elephant Standards (ACES)
- Website: www.kulenforest.asia

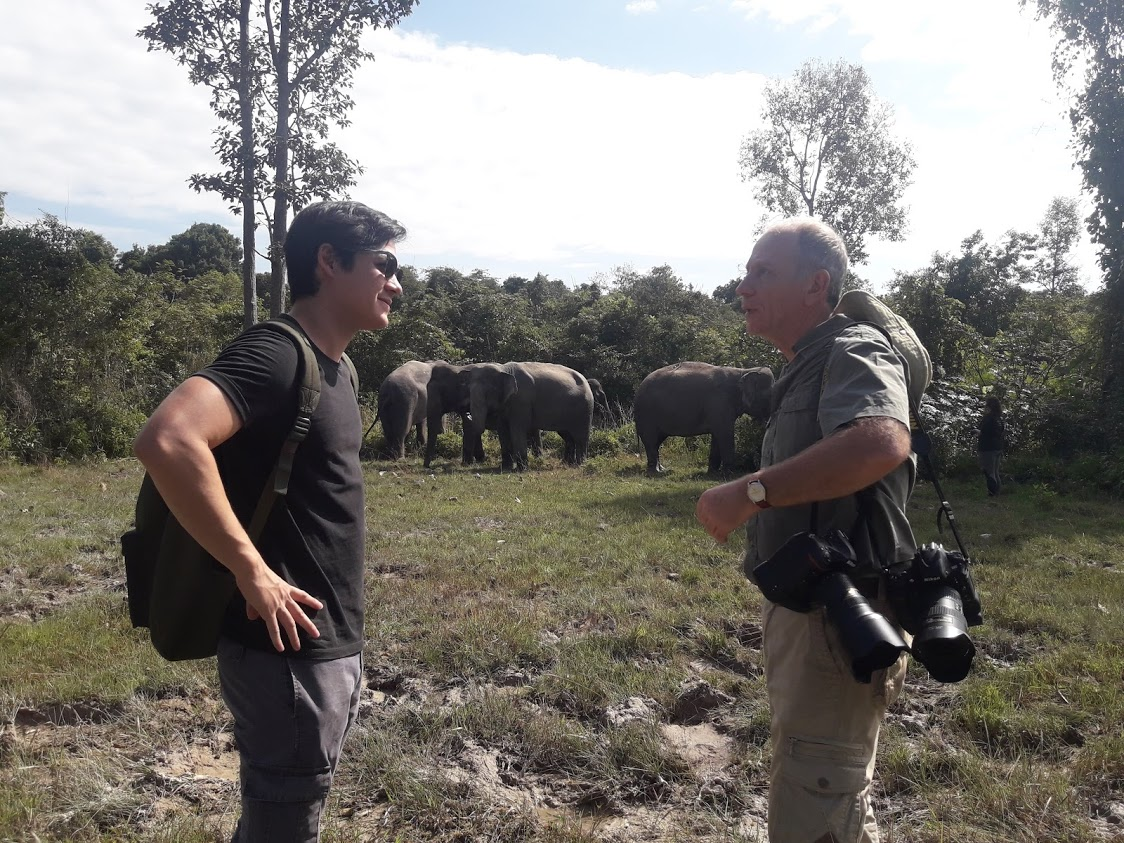
Elephant retirement park owner and co-founder David Piot and French photographer Philippe Alexandre Chevallier with the Kulen elephants browsing in the Kulen forest

Kulen Elephant Forest is a conservation organization founded in 2018 by David Piot. The reserve is a 400-hectare elephant retirement park which opened in December 2019 and protects the captive Asian elephants in Siem Reap Province in Cambodia, as well as up to 1100 acres of protected forest inhabited by the former elephants of Angkor UNESCO World Heritage site.

== Location ==
KEFs elephants are located in Bos Thom Community Forest in Ballangk commune, Prasat Bakong district, 40 km north from Siem Reap city on National Road 64. Every tour departs from KEF office in downtown Siem Reap where a shuttle will take visitors on a one-hour drive to the Kulen Elephant Forest.

== Activities ==
At the KEF reserve, visitors with no more than 12 people in a group, will spend time learning about elephants and follow them by foot through their natural habitat, observing their relationships and behaviors, as they browse in the forest. The elephants do not take people on rides nor are they required to perform tricks or beg people to buy food for them.

== KEF elephants ==
Presently, Kulen Elephant Forest consist of ten elephants, which is the largest herd of private owned elephants in Cambodia. The elephants include, the bull Kham Song and the nine females Chi Chlorb, Chi Mean, Chi Ole, Chi Tone, Chi Youl, Gom Phoy, Iplock, Itok, and Savath, retired to the Bos Thom Community Forest at the foothills of Kulen Mountain in Siem Reap Province.

Eighteen mahouts are working in shifts to care for the elephants and keep them from causing any damage to the local villagers’ fields. KEF elephants and the KEF mahout staff was between April 2019 and December 2024, trained and managed by the Swedish zookeeper and elephant consultant Dan Koehl, being responsible for care and management of KEF elephants and Mahouts as elephant welfare director.

== Accreditation by ACES ==
In 2023, KEF became the first elephant facility throughout Cambodia to be awarded ‘Certified Facility’ accreditation from leaders in elephant venue auditing, Asian Captive Elephant Standards (ACES), as part of a program coordinated by Deutsche Gesellschaft für Internationale Zusammenarbeit (GIZ) and the Pacific Asia Travel Association.

The audit covered 193 criteria in eight different areas including elephant welfare, elephant interaction, community relations and biodiversity, and conservation. The result of this audit was the awarding of a silver-level certification, representing the satisfaction of 100% of the mandatory criteria and 70%-plus of the advanced criteria.

Elephants at Kulen are well taken care of and performing daily care routine that is not happening in usual camps.

— ACES director Nicolas Dubrocard, "Elephant audit gets thumbs up", News article Khmer Times (November 17, 2022)

== Scientific research ==
Since 2023, KEF has in collaboration with the Cambodian chapter of The School for Field Studies (SFS) also contributed to scientific research, by letting their elephants be part of the schools Asian Elephant Ecology program and field exercise. Students from SFS studied the Kulen elephants on distance, while the elephants were browsing in the forest, and later collected plant material they had eaten, in order to identify which species of plants the elephants eat. Finally, it was possible to make a list of 80 species of plants which are parts of the Kulen elephants diet, and a scientific paper about the studies will be published in autumn of 2023.

== Elephants in Cambodia ==
Wars, and the time during which Cambodia was ruled by the Khmer Rouge reduced the population of Cambodia’s elephants, both in the wild as well as in captivity. Cambodia is presently home to less than 75 captive Asian elephants, most of them being cared for by private owners in Mondulkiri Province. It is estimated that there are between 400 and 600 wild elephants in Cambodia, with between 100 and 130 living in the Keo Seima Wildlife Sanctuary and nearly 200 in the Cardamom Mountains.
