= Ministry of Justice (Cambodia) =

Government ministry of Cambodia

- ក្រសួងយុត្តិធម៌
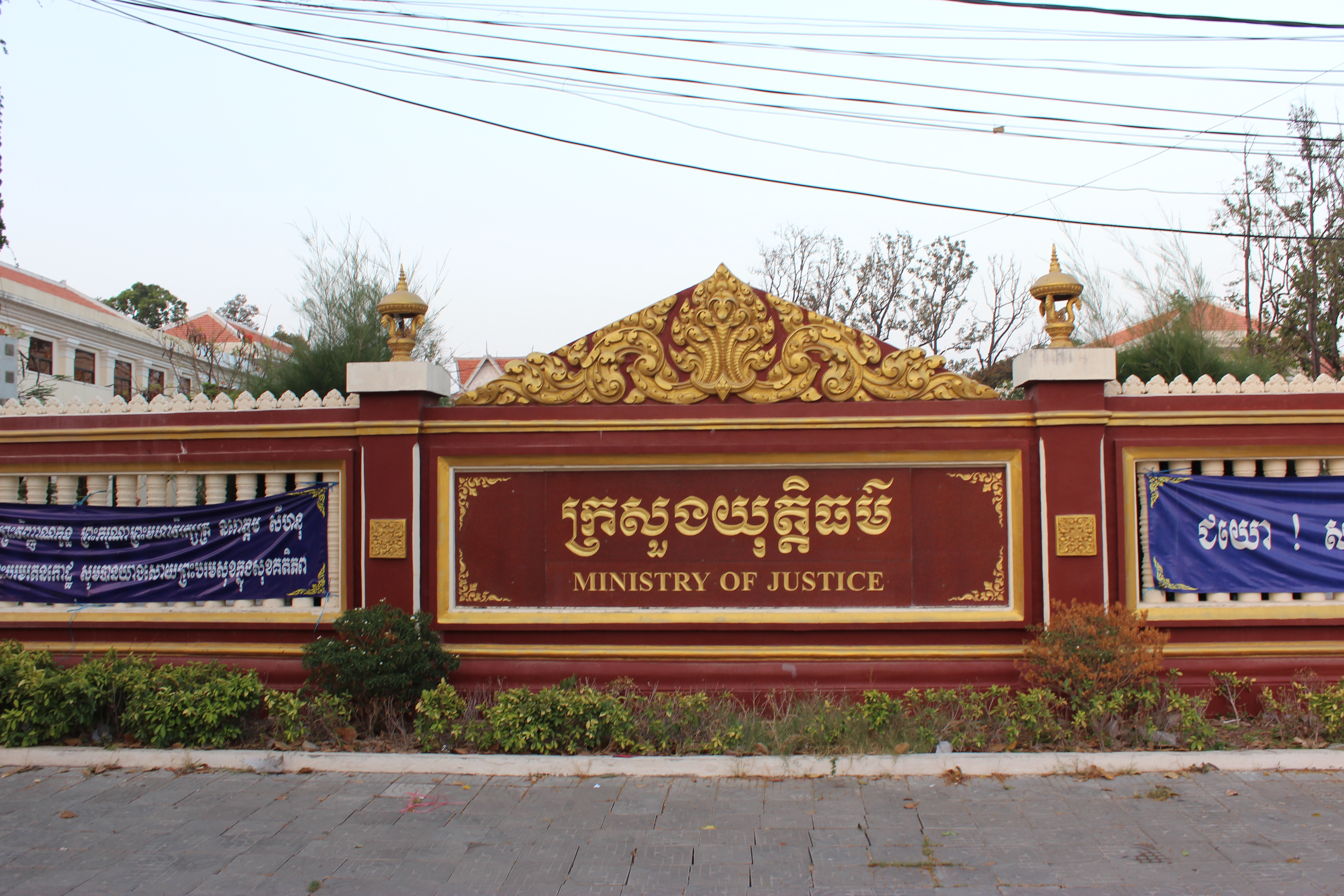
- Ministry of Justice in Phnom Penh

Agency overview
- Jurisdiction: Government of Cambodia
- Headquarters: Samdech Sothearos Blvd, Phnom Penh
- Minister responsible: Koeut Rith, Minister of Justice
- Website: https://www.moj.gov.kh/

The Ministry of Justice (Khmer: ក្រសួងយុត្តិធម៌, Krâsuŏng Yŭttĕthôrm) provides the administrative framework for the judges and prosecutors such as their professional training and salary and duty allowances. Additionally, with regard to prosecutors, the Minister of Justice is the chief of the prosecution and has the right to issue an injunction (order) to the prosecutions of all level of courts. The General Departments of Prosecutor and Criminal Affairs of the Ministry of Justice is the staff to the Minister of Justice on any related issues.

== List of ministers ==
- Sisowath Watchayavong (1946-1948)
- Kosal (1949-1950)
- Chan Nak (1950)
- Chuop Samloth (October 1955 - January 1956)
- Chuop Samloth (March 1956 - September 1956)
- Phy Thien Lay (1962-1964)
- Ponn Vongs Vaddey (1966)
- Yem Sambaur (1967)
- Tep Hun (1967–1969)
- Yem Sambaur (1970–1972)
- Chhan Sokhom (October 1972 - April 1973)
- Ly Khvan Pan (1974–1975)
- Norodom Phurissara (1975–1976)
- Kang Chap (1976-?) in Democratic Kampuchea
- Ouk Bunchhoeun (1980-1993)
- Chem Snguon (1993–1998)
- Uk Vithun (1998–2001)
- Neav Sithong (2001-2004)
- Ang Vong Vattana (2004–2020)
- Koeut Rith (2020–present)

== See also ==
- Justice ministry
- Politics of Cambodia
