= Southern Cardamom National Park =

Conservation area in Cambodia

- ឧទ្យានជាតិជួរភ្នំក្រវាញខាងត្បូង
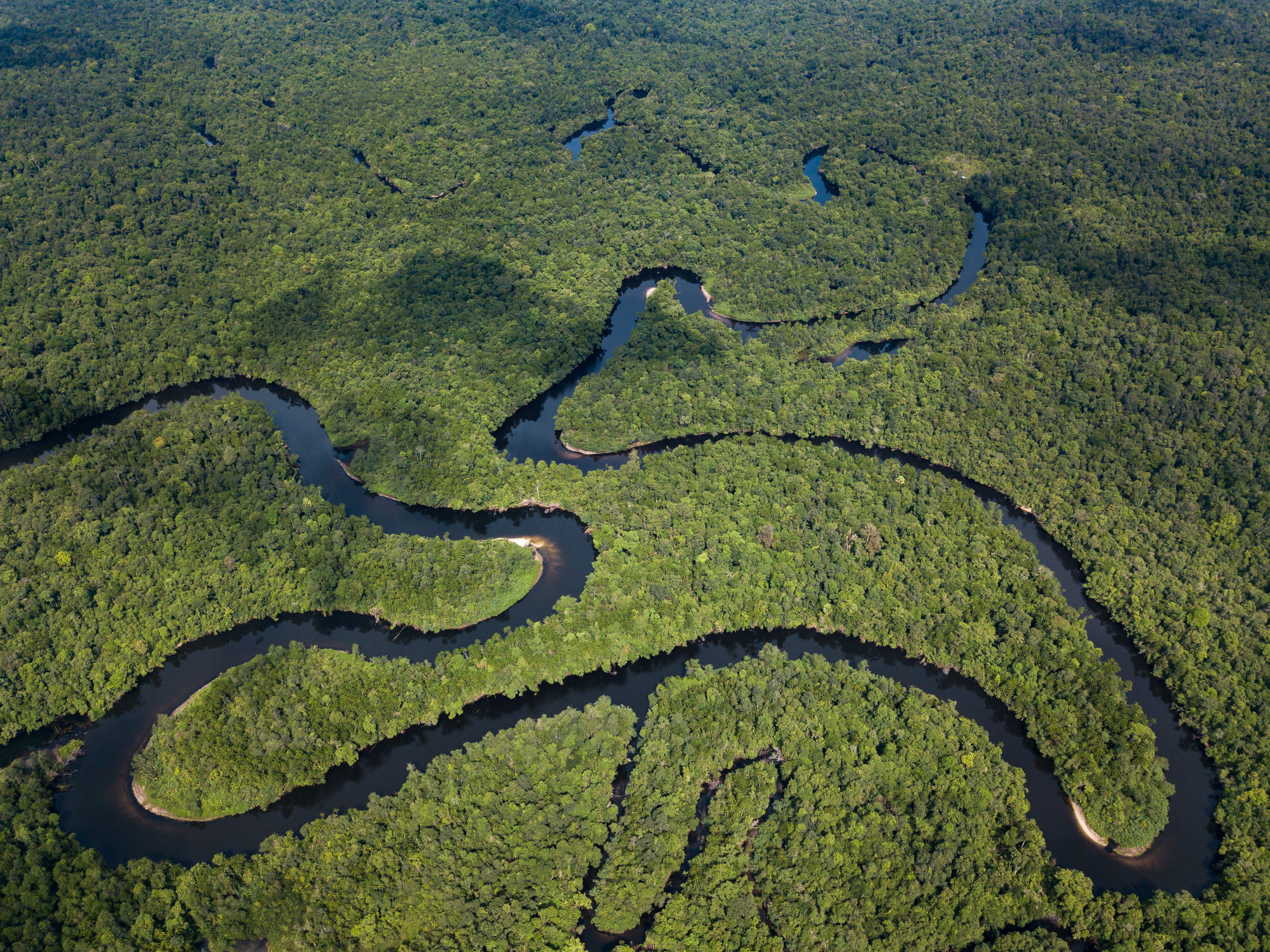
- Stung Proat, Cardamom Mountains

- Location within Cambodia
- Location: Koh Kong, Pursat, Kampong Speu and Preah Sihanouk, Cambodia
- Coordinates: 11.428598°N 103.667159°E
- Area: 4,103.92 km^{2} (1,584.53 sq mi)
- Established: 2016
- Governing body: Ministry of Environment (Cambodia)

Southern Cardamom National Park (Khmer: ឧទ្យានជាតិជួរភ្នំក្រវាញខាងត្បូង, romanized: utyeancheate chuor phnomkravanh khangotbaung) is a national park in Cambodia. The protection was established on 9 May 2016 and covers 4,104 km^{2} (1,585 sq mi) in the southern parts of the Cardamom Mountains. The national park is administratively divided into three sectors; Western Sector, Central Sector and Eastern Sector.

The Southern Cardamom National Park connects existing protected areas in and around the Greater Cardamom Mountains, providing a total contiguous area under protection of 18,211 km^{2} (7,031 sq mi). The other protected areas in the landscape include Phnom Samkos Wildlife Sanctuary, Central Cardamom Mountains National Park and Phnom Aural Wildlife Sanctuary, covering the northern parts of the Cardamom Mountains, and Peam Krasop Wildlife Sanctuary, Botum Sakor National Park and Kirirom National Park, south of the park. In addition to safeguarding habitats and wildlife corridors for larger animals, a main purpose of the national park is to create a safe wildlife protection for reintroducing tigers to Cambodia. Tigers went extinct in Cambodia in 2007.

The park is home to more than 60 globally threatened animals such as the Malayan sun bear and Sunda pangolin as well as endangered species like the Irrawady dolphin and Siamese crocodile. The park has 17 species of endangered trees, some of which are endemic to Cambodia.

The protection of the park is the responsibility of the Cambodian government, and the task is carried out by Cambodia’s Forestry Administration in cooperation with the Global Conservation agency and Wildlife Alliance. Global Conservation is an international organisation specialising in the protection of endangered UNESCO World Heritage and national parks in developing countries.

Part of the protected area forms part of the Southern Cardamom REDD+ Project (SCRP). Human Rights Watch criticized this project for driving members of the Chong ethnic group from their indigenous lands, prompting Verra to open an investigation into the project.

== Flora and fauna ==
In July 2024, sixty Siamese crocodiles from five distinct nests have successfully hatched. This marks the largest wild breeding record of the species this century and significantly enhances the survival prospects of this critically endangered reptile.
