= Phnom Samkos =

Mountain in Cambodia

- Samkos Mountain
- Location within Cambodia

Highest point
- Elevation: 1,759 m (5,771 ft)
- Prominence: 1,580 m (5,180 ft)
- Listing: Ribu
- Coordinates: 12°09′21″N 103°02′36″E

Geography
- Location: Pursat, Cambodia
- Parent range: Cardamom Mountains

Phnom Samkos (Khmer: ភ្នំសំកុស; Samkos Mountain) is the second-highest peak in Cambodia, located in the western Cardamom Mountains at 1,759 metres (5,771 ft) above sea level. It is situated within the Phnom Samkos Wildlife Sanctuary, which takes its name from the mountain, and Central Cardamom Mountains National Park. The elevation and surrounding forest basin support a large variety of rare flora and fauna.

== See also ==
- List of ultras of Southeast Asia
- Wildlife of Cambodia
