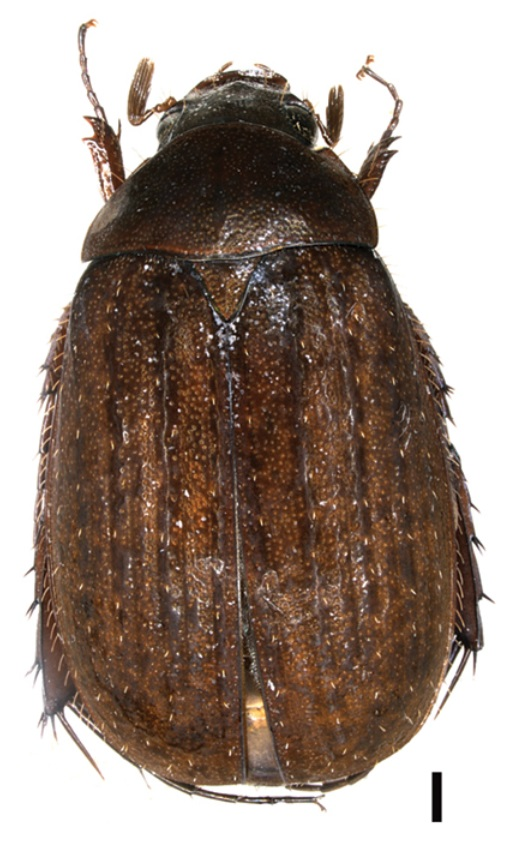

Scientific classification
- Kingdom: Animalia
- Phylum: Arthropoda
- Class: Insecta
- Order: Coleoptera
- Suborder: Polyphaga
- Infraorder: Scarabaeiformia
- Family: Scarabaeidae
- Genus: Neoserica
- Species: N. cardamomensis

Binomial name
- Neoserica cardamomensis Ahrens, Liu, Fabrizi, Bai & Yang, 2014

= Neoserica cardamomensis =

Species of beetle

Neoserica cardamomensis is a species of beetle of the family Scarabaeidae. It is found in Cambodia, Laos, Thailand and China (Yunnan).

== Description ==
Adults reach a length of about 11.4–14.1 mm. They have a dark brown, oblong body. The antennal club is yellowish brown and the anterior labroclypeus is shiny. The dorsal surface is dull, the opaque toment on the elytra and pronotum is less thick, with a light trace of shine, sparsely setose.

== Etymology ==
The species is named after the Cardamom Mountains where its type locality is situated.
