= Thma Bang District =

Thma Bang ស្រុកថ្មបាំង
- District (srok)
- Location in Cambodia
- Coordinates: 11°49′N 103°25′E
- Country: Cambodia
- Province: Koh Kong
- Communes: 6
- Villages: 18

Population (1998)
  - Total: 2,880
- Time zone: +7
- Geocode: 0907

Thma Bang District is one of six districts (srok) and a municipality of Koh Kong Province in south-west Cambodia. It is about 72 kilometres (45 mi) from central Koh Kong. Thma Bang district is bordered on the east by Sre Ambel District and Aoral District of Kompong Speu Province, on the west by Koh Kong District and Mondol Sima District, on the north by Velveng District and Krovanh District of Pursat Province and on the south by Botumsakor District. Thma Bang district has 6 communes comprising to 17 villages and occupies 3,465 square kilometres (1,338 mi^{2}). About 98% of the population are farmers who depend on agriculture and forest resources hunting for living. Conservation International Cambodia has maintained field activities in Koh Kong Province supported through a field office and a sub-office in Thma Bang District.

Thma Bang
Khum (Commune)	Phum (Villages)
Ta Tey Leu	Spean Kdar, Kandal, Trapeang Khnar
Pralay	Chamnar, Pralay, Samraong, Toap Khley, Ta Ngil
Chumnoab	Chumnoab, Chrak Ruessei
Ruessei Chrum	Trapeang Chheu Trav, Kokir Chrum
Chi-Phat	Chi Phat, Tuek L'ao, Chom Sla', Kom Lot
Thmor Donpove	Kaoh, Preaek Svay
