= Phnom Kmoch =

- Location within Cambodia

Highest point
- Elevation: 1,220 m (4,000 ft)
- Coordinates: 12°10′00″N 103°01′01″E

Geography
- Location: Pursat Province, Cambodia
- Parent range: Cardamom Mountains

Phnom Kmoch is a mountain peak in Pursat Province, Cambodia. It is 1,220 meters tall

Phnom Kmoch is a conspicuous mountain located in the western part of the Cardamon Range.

== See also ==
- Cardamom Mountains
