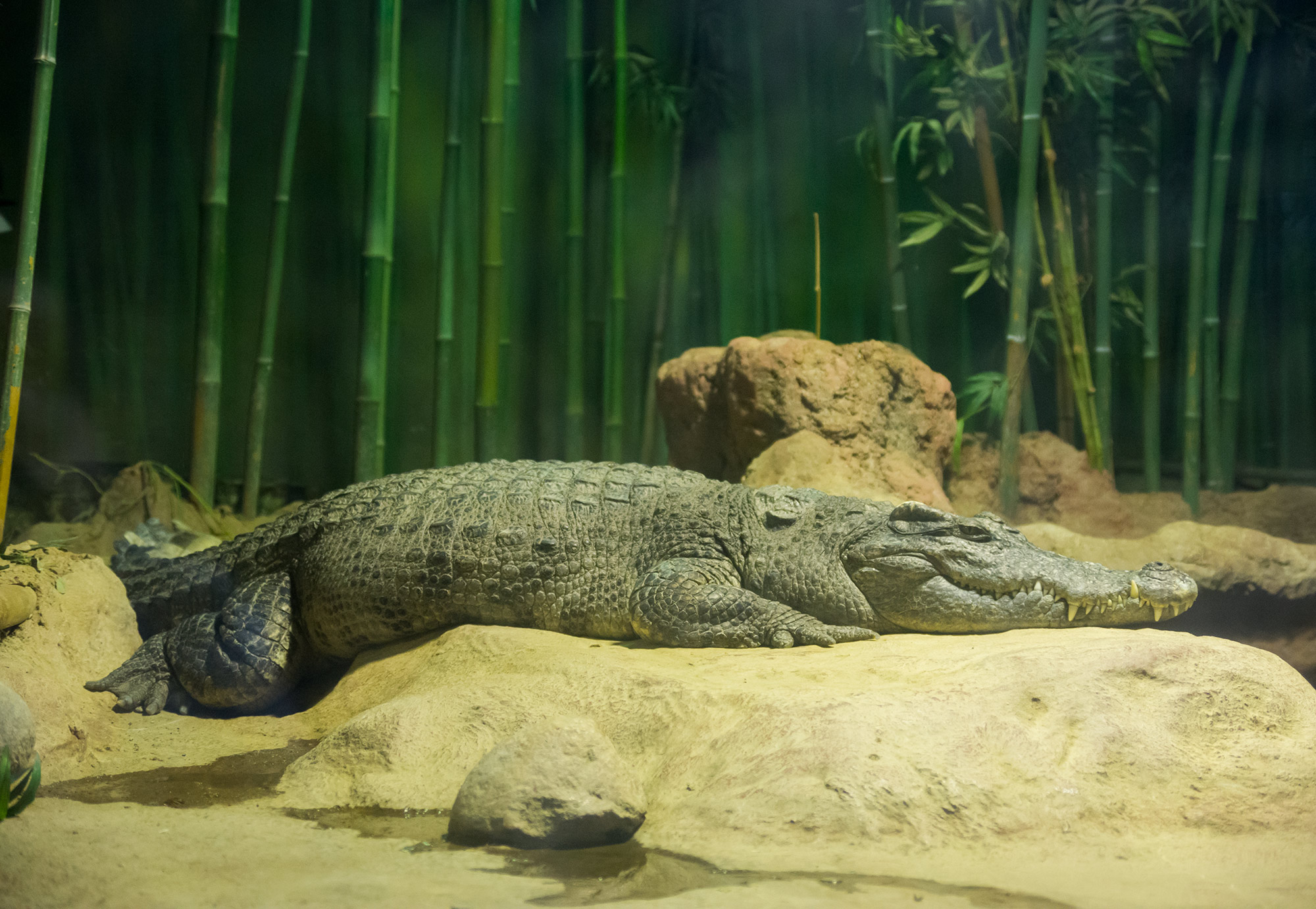
- Siamese crocodile at Moscow Zoo

Conservation status
- Critically Endangered (IUCN 3.1)
- CITES Appendix I

Scientific classification
- Kingdom: Animalia
- Phylum: Chordata
- Class: Reptilia
- Order: Crocodylia
- Family: Crocodylidae
- Genus: Crocodylus
- Species: C. siamensis

Binomial name
- Crocodylus siamensis Schneider, 1801
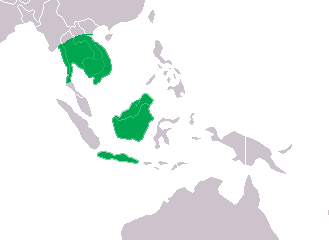

Synonyms
- †Crocodylus ossifragus Dubois, 1908

= Siamese crocodile =

Siamese crocodile Temporal range: Pleistocene–Present, 2.6–0 Ma

Species of reptile

The Siamese crocodile (Crocodylus siamensis) is a medium-sized freshwater crocodile native to Thailand, Laos, Cambodia, Vietnam and Kalimantan in Indonesia. It is critically endangered.

== Taxonomy ==
The Siamese crocodile was scientifically described by Johann Gottlob Schneider in 1801 under the name Crocodilus siamensis based on a zoological specimen from Thailand.

== Phylogeny ==
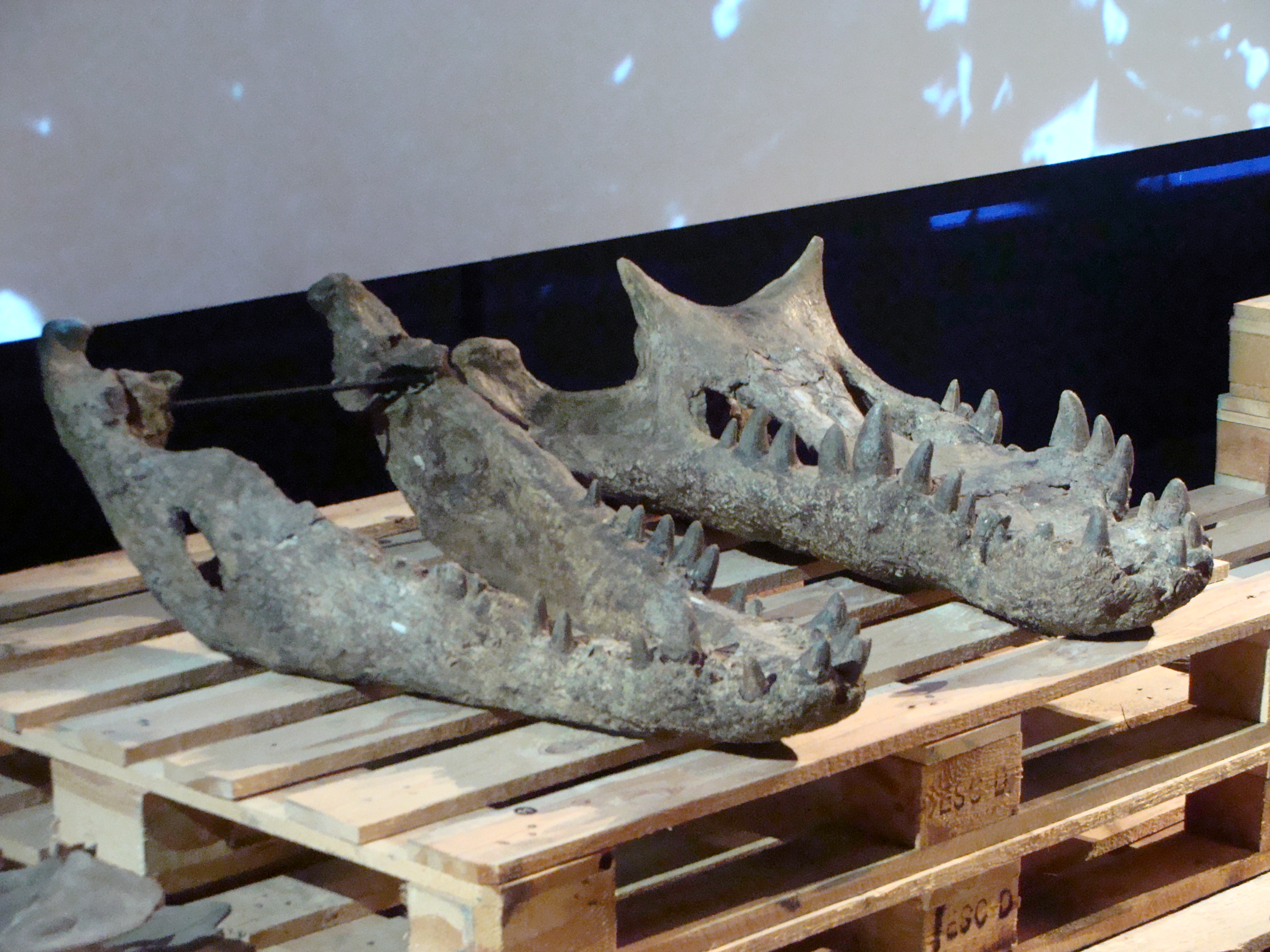
Fossils, formerly referred to as Crocodylus ossifragus

Below is a cladogram based on a 2018 tip dating study using morphological, molecular DNA sequencing, and stratigraphic fossil age data. This was revised in a paleogenomics study using DNA extracted from the extinct Voay. Hall's New Guinea crocodile placement was suggested in 2023.

- Crocodylus
  - - - - - - Crocodylus johnstoni Freshwater crocodile
      - - - - Crocodylus novaeguineae New Guinea crocodile
          - - Crocodylus halli Hall's New Guinea crocodile
        - - - Crocodylus mindorensis Philippine crocodile
    - - - - - Crocodylus porosus Saltwater crocodile
      - - - - Crocodylus siamensis Siamese crocodile
        - - - Crocodylus palustris Mugger crocodile
  - - - - - - Crocodylus suchus West African crocodile
    - - - - - Crocodylus niloticus Nile crocodile
      - - - - Crocodylus rhombifer Cuban crocodile
        - - - Crocodylus intermedius Orinoco crocodile
            - Crocodylus acutus American crocodile
          - - Crocodylus moreletii Morelet's crocodile

== Characteristics ==
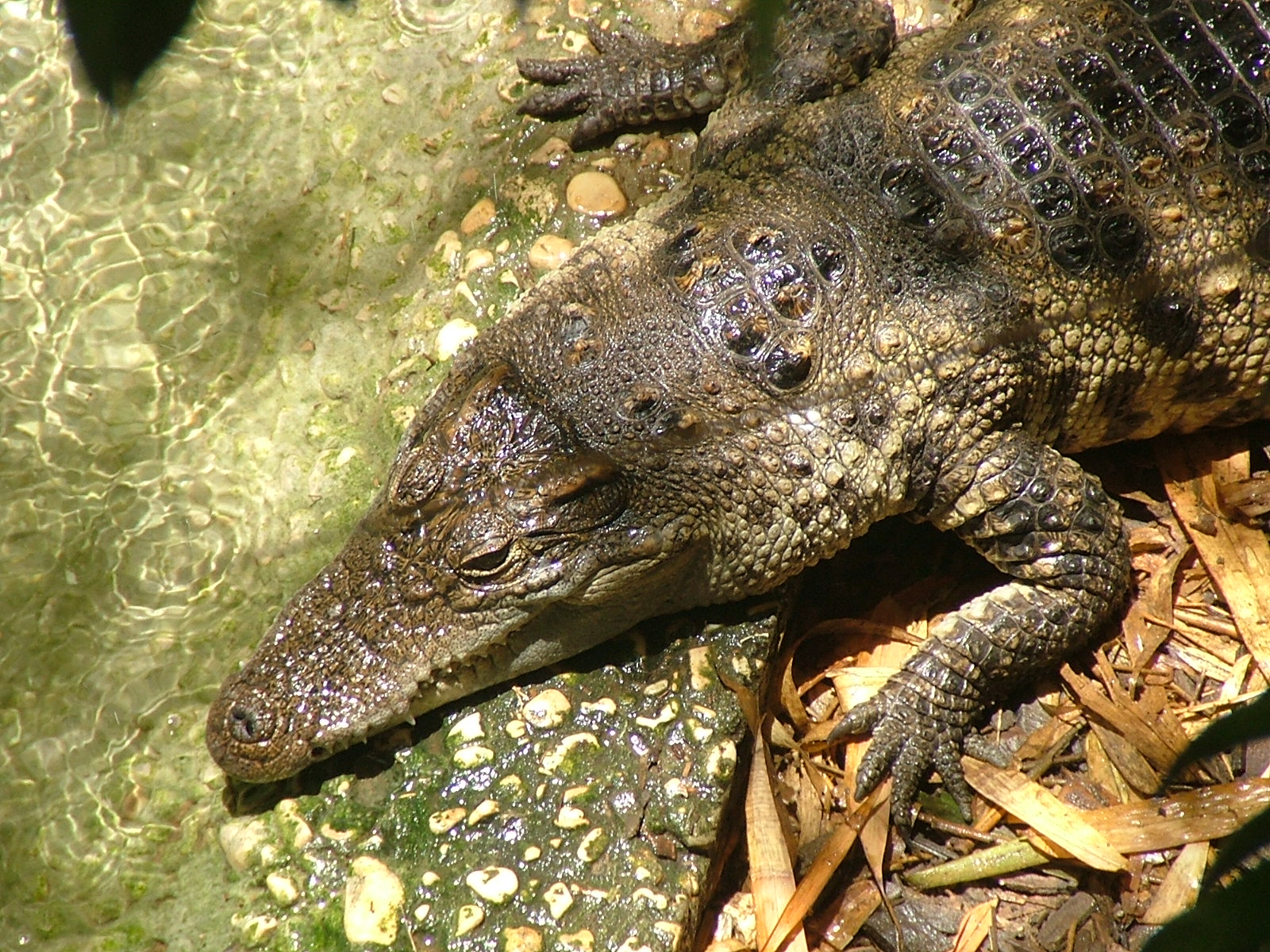
Siamese Crocodile – Biblical Zoo

The Siamese crocodile is a medium-sized, freshwater crocodilian, with a relatively broad, smooth snout and an elevated, bony crest behind each eye. Overall, it is olive-green, with some variation to dark-green. Young individuals measure 1.2–1.5 m (3.9–4.9 ft) and weigh 6–12 kg (13–26 lb), growing to a length of 2.1–3 m (6.9–9.8 ft) and a weight of 40–120 kg (88–265 lb) as an adult. Three individuals measuring 2.12–2.63 m (7.0–8.6 ft) and weighing 40–87 kg (88–192 lb) had bite force of 2,073–4,577 N (466–1,029 lb_{f}). Large male individuals reach 4 m (13 ft) and 350 kg (770 lb) in weight.

== Distribution and habitat ==
The Siamese crocodile inhabits a wide range of freshwater habitats, including slow-moving rivers and streams, lakes, seasonal oxbow lakes, marshes and swamps. It has been documented up to an elevation of 730 m (2,400 ft).

In Cambodia, the presence of the Siamese crocodile has been documented in 11 provinces at 35 sites during surveys from 2000 to 2014; this population was thought to encompass 200–400 individuals. In September 2021, eight hatchlings were found in a wildlife sanctuary in eastern Cambodia.

Small population survive in Thailand and Laos. In March 2005, conservationists found a nest containing juvenile Siamese crocodiles in the southern Lao Savannakhet Province.

A small population lives in East Kalimantan, Indonesia.

== Behaviour and ecology ==
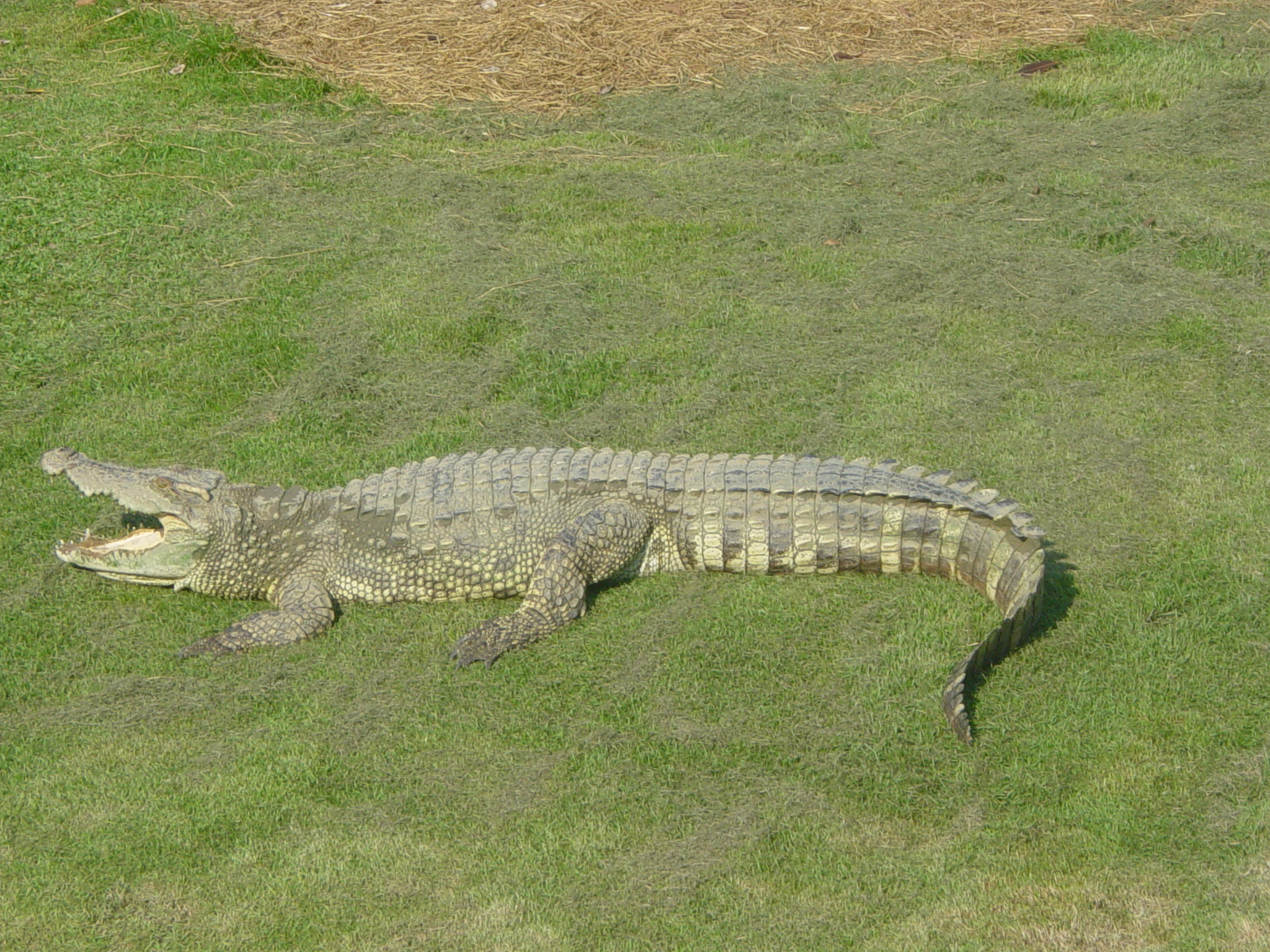
Siamese crocodile sleeping with its mouth open to release heat

Despite conservation concerns, many aspects of C. siamensis life history in the wild remain unknown, particularly regarding its reproductive biology.

Adults feed mainly on fish and snakes, but also eat amphibians and small mammals.

Very little is known about the natural history of this species in the wild, but females build mound-nests constructed from scraped-up plant debris mixed with mud. In captivity, these crocodiles breed during the wet season (April to May), laying between 15 and 50 eggs, which are then guarded until they hatch. After incubation, the female will assist her young as they break out of their eggs and then carry the hatchlings to the water in her jaws.

Pure, unhybridised examples of this species are generally unaggressive towards humans, and there are only four confirmed attacks, none of them fatal. One was defending its young, another was probably defending itself, one was provoked, and the reason for the last is unclear. A fifth attack in 1928 that was probably done by a Siamese crocodile was fatal, with the victim being a child.

== Threats ==
The Siamese crocodile is one of the most endangered crocodiles; the global population has been severely reduced by over 80% since the 1940s, mainly due to hunting, and all population units are small and fragmented. It is threatened by human disturbance and habitat occupation, which is forcing remaining populations to the edges of their former range. As of 2012, it was thought to be possibly extinct in Indonesia, and its presence was uncertain in Myanmar and Malaysia.

=== Habitat degradation ===
Factors causing loss of habitat include conversion of wetlands for agriculture, use of chemical fertilisers, pesticides in rice production, and an increase of the cattle population. The effects of warfare stemming from the conflicts in Vietnam, Laos and Cambodia during the Vietnam War (from land mines to aerial bombardment) have also been factored.

Many river systems, including those in protected areas, have hydroelectric power dams approved or proposed, which are likely to cause the loss of about half of the remaining breeding colonies within the next ten years. One cause for habitat degradation via hydrological changes, for the Siamese crocodile, is the implementation of dams on the upper Mekong River and its major tributaries. Potential impacts of dam construction include wetland loss and altered flooding cycle with a dry season flow 50% greater than under natural conditions.

=== Exploitation and fragmentation ===
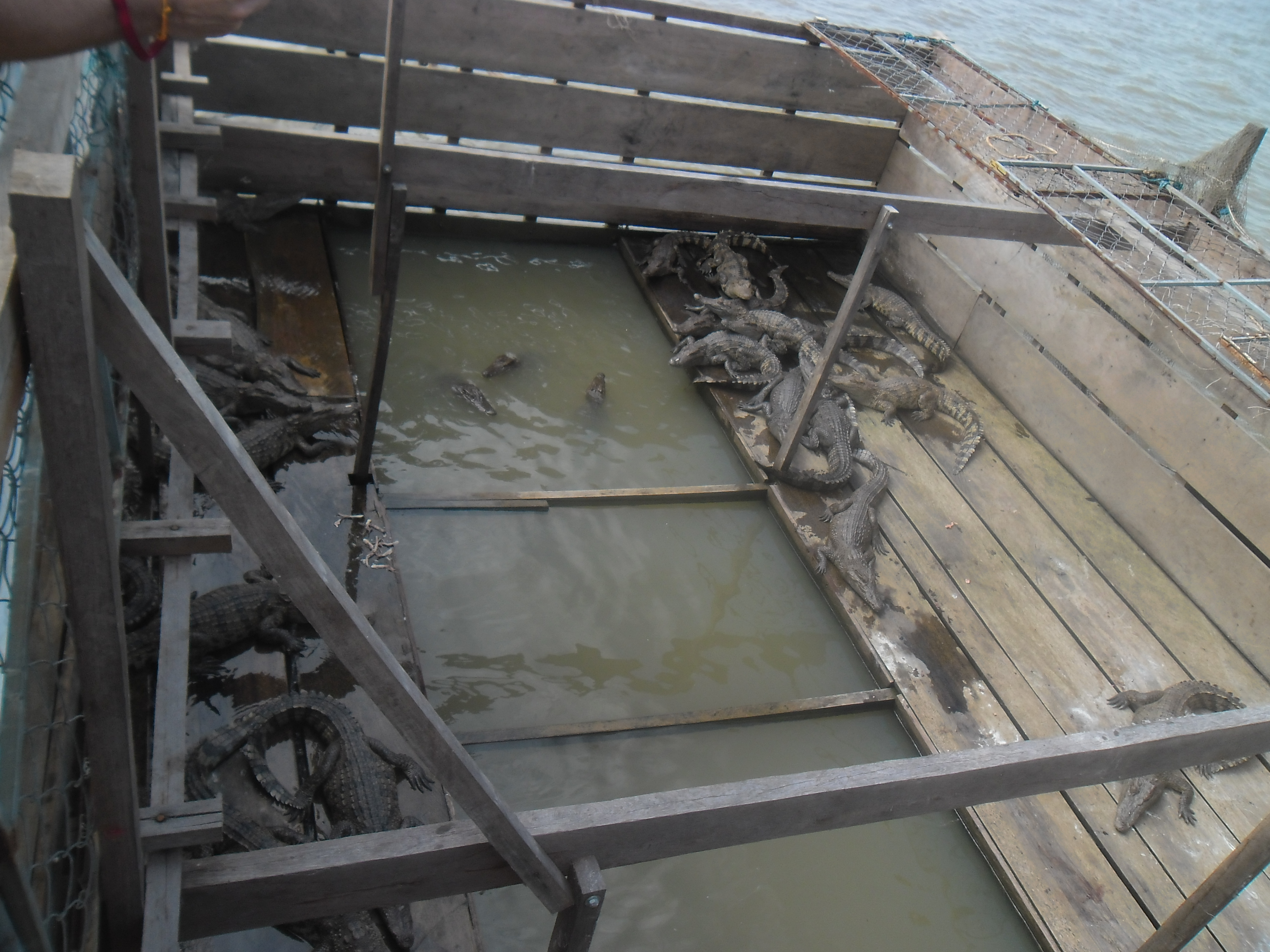
Siamese crocodile farm on Tonle Sap in Cambodia

Illegal capture of wild crocodiles for supply to farms is an ongoing threat, as well as incidental capture/drowning in fishing nets and traps. The Siamese crocodile currently has extremely low and fragmented remaining populations with little proven reproduction in the wild.

Poaching is a severe threat to the Siamese crocodile, with the value of wild ones reaching hundreds of dollars in the black market, where they are illegally taken into crocodile farms and hybridized with other, larger species. Siamese crocodiles have historically been captured for skins and to stock commercial crocodile farms. In 1945, skin hunting for commercial farms was banned by the French colonial administration of Cambodia. In the late 1940s, populations spurred the development of farms and harvesting wild crocodiles for stocking these farms. Protection was abolished by the Khmer Rouge, but later reinstated under Article 18 of the Fishery Law of 1987, which "forbids the catching, selling, and transportation of...[wild] crocodiles..."

Crocodile farming now has a huge economic impact in the provinces surrounding Tonle Sap, where 396 farms held over 20,000 crocodiles in 1998. Many crocodiles were exported from Cambodia since the mid-1980s to stock commercial farms in Thailand, Vietnam, and China.

Despite legal protection, a profitable market exists for the capture and sale of crocodiles to farms since the early 1980s. Chronic hunting has led to the decline of the wild Siamese crocodile.

== Conservation ==
The Siamese crocodile is classified as critically endangered on the IUCN Red List, and is listed on Appendix I of CITES.

In Cambodia, Fauna and Flora International and the Government of Cambodia's Forestry Administration have established the Cambodian Crocodile Conservation Programme for the protection and recovery of the Siamese crocodile. This programme works with a network of indigenous people who are helping to protect key sites such as a marsh in Veal Veng district, the Tatai River in Thma Bang District and the Araeng River. The latter is thought to host the second largest of Siamese crocodile population in the world, but is currently threatened by the proposed construction of a massive dam. When water level rise during the monsoon season of June–November, Siamese crocodiles move out of the river and onto large lakes and other water bodies; they return to the rivers once water levels start receding. In Cambodia's Southern Cardamom National Park, sixty Siamese crocodiles from five distinct nests successfully hatched in July 2024. This marks the largest wild breeding record of the species this century and significantly enhances the survival prospects of the species. In July 2026, Cambodia's Ministry of Environment designated a 315 ha (780 acres) wetland in Pursat province as a conservation area, which is home to at least forty Siamese crocodiles.

Pang Sida National Park in Thailand has a project to reintroduce Siamese crocodile into the wild. A number of young crocodiles have been released into a small and remote river inside the park.

=== In captivity ===
Several countries in Southeast Asia are involved in captive breeding programs for commercial use. The Wildlife Conservation Society is working with the government of Laos on a new programme to save the Siamese crocodile and its wetland habitat. In August 2011, a press release announced the successful hatching of a clutch of 20 Siamese crocodiles. These eggs were then incubated at the Laos Zoo. This project represents a new effort by WCS to conserve the biodiversity and habitat of Laos' Savannakhet Province, promotes conservation of biodiversity for the whole landscape, and relies on community involvement from local residents.

=== Priority projects ===
High priority projects include:

- Status surveys and development of crocodile management and conservation programmes in Cambodia and Laos: These two countries appear to be the remaining stronghold of the species. Identifying key areas and populations, and obtaining quantitative estimates of population size as a precursor to initiating conservation programs is needed.
- Implementation of protection of habitat and restocking in Thailand: Thailand has the best-organized protected-areas system, the largest source of farm-raised crocodiles for restocking, and the most-developed crocodile management programme in the region. Although the species has virtually disappeared from the wild, re-establishment of viable populations in protected areas is feasible.
- Protection of crocodile populations in Vietnam: a combination of habitat protection and captive breeding could prevent loss of the species in Vietnam. A breeding population has been successfully re-established in Cát Tiên National Park. Further surveys, identification of suitable localities and the implementation of a conservation programme coordinated with the captive breeding efforts of Vietnamese institutions is needed.
- Investigation of the taxonomy of the freshwater crocodiles in Southeast Asia and the Indo-Malaysian Archipelago: The relationships among the freshwater crocodiles in the Indo-Malaysian Archipelago are poorly understood. Clarification of these relationships is of scientific interest and has important implications for conservation.

Other projects include:

- Maintain a stock of pure C. siamensis in crocodile farms: The bulk of the captives worldwide are maintained in several farms in Thailand where extensive interbreeding with C. porosus has taken place. Hybrids are preferred for their superior commercial qualities, but the hybridisation threatens the genetic integrity of the most threatened species of crocodilians. Farms should be encouraged to segregate genetically pure Siamese crocodiles for conservation, in addition to the hybrids they are promoting for hide production.
- Survey and protection of Siamese crocodiles in Indonesia: Verification of the presence of C. siamensis in Kalimantan and Java is a first step to developing protection for the species within the context of the developing crocodile management strategy in Indonesia.

== Cultural references ==
A Malay folktale features a crocodile that is outwitted by a mouse-deer and buffaloes.
