= Phnom Aural Wildlife Sanctuary =

Protected area in Cambodia

- Khmer: ដែនជម្រកសត្វព្រៃភ្នំឱរ៉ាល់
- IUCN category IV (habitat/species management area)
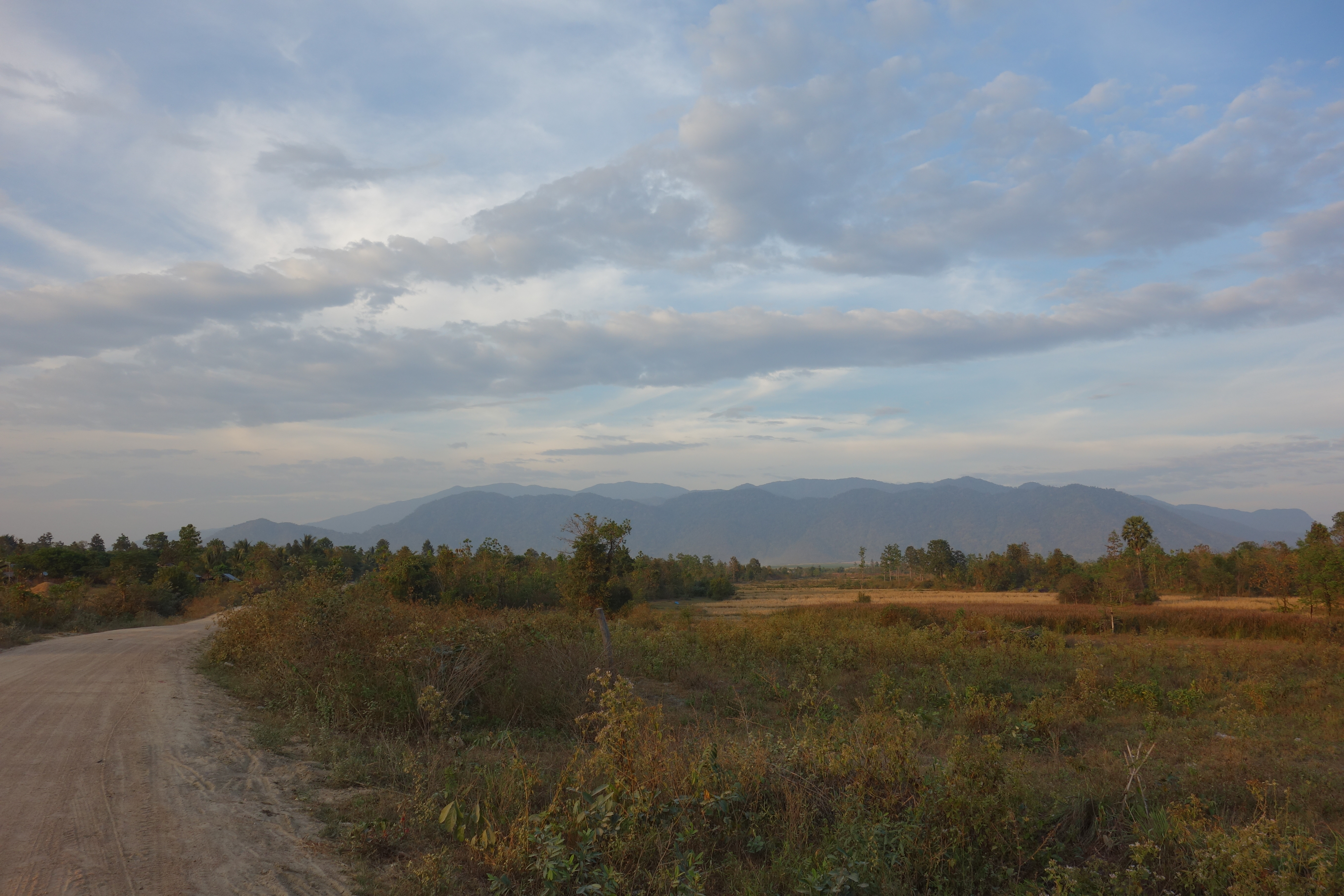
- View of Phnom Aural Wildlife Sanctuary

- Location within Cambodia
- Location: Kampong Chhnang Province, Kampong Speu Province and Pursat Province, Cambodia
- Nearest city: Kampong Chhnang
- Coordinates: 11°54′45″N 104°03′42″E
- Area: 2,544.85 km^{2} (982.57 sq mi)
- Established: 1993
- Governing body: Ministry of Environment

Phnom Aural Wildlife Sanctuary is a protected area in central Cambodia, covering 2,544.85 km^{2} (982.57 sq mi). It was established in 1993. It is named after Phnom Aural, the country's tallest peak at 1,810 m (5,940 ft). The Aural mountains are part of the much larger Cardamom Mountains.

Immediately west of Phnom Aural Wildlife Sanctuary is Central Cardamom Mountains National Park.

This area is threatened by the exceptional danger of illegal logging. The still existing primary forest is reduced to lesser the 50 km2 by March 2026 already.

The IBA supports the conservation of two bird populations that have a limited presence in the endemic bird area between the mountains of Cambodia and Thailand. These are the Chestnut-headed Partridge and the Cambodian Laughingthrush (Garrulax ferrarius).
