= Samlaut Multiple Use Area =

Protected area in Cambodia

- IUCN category VI (protected area with sustainable use of natural resources)
- Location within Cambodia
- Location: Battambang Province, Cambodia
- Nearest city: Battambang
- Coordinates: 12°43′3″N 102°38′22″E
- Area: 599.16 km^{2} (231.34 sq mi)
- Established: 1993
- Governing body: Cambodian Ministry of Environment

Samlaut Multiple Use Area is a 599.16 km^{2} (231.34 sq mi) large multiple use management area in northwestern Cambodia that was established in 1993. It is part of the Cardamom Mountains in Battambang and Pailin Provinces.

Samlout was declared a protected area in 1993 by King Norodom Sihanouk along with other forests and preserves. Samlout is the last remaining tropical rainforest in north-western Cambodia, covering 60,000 hectares. It is home to a wide array of rare vegetation and wildlife, including the endangered Asian elephant.

Samlout's network of rivers provides the main drinking water, food and health securities for almost 1 million people. Tens of thousands of small farmers rely on its water system to irrigate crops before flowing into the country's largest permanent body of fresh water, the Tonle Sap Lake. Samlout's Stung Sangker River plays an essential role supporting the lake's important fishery and lowland agricultural lands.

Due to the limited financial capabilities of Cambodia, Samlout receives little government support for wildlife management and law-enforcement for nature conservation. In 2003, external funding and cooperation with the Maddox Jolie-Pitt Foundation (MJP) opened up for foreign support and assistance for proper protection of Samlaut Multiple Use Area. On 3 October 2006, MJP, the Cambodian Ministry of Environment and the National Park Service of the United States signed an agreement making the Sequoia and Kings Canyon National Parks sister parks to Samlaut. The agreement facilitates the sharing of experience, skills, technical knowledge, and professional abilities between the two protected areas.

In 2009, MJP entered into discussions with Cambodian and Thai park officials on the need to create a Transboundary Peace Park between Samlout and 2 Thai border parks (Namtok Khlong Kaew National Park and Kahlong Kreua Wai Wildlife Sanctuary). The three protected areas combined cover nearly 110,000 hectares.
