= Phnom Samkos Wildlife Sanctuary =

Protected area in Cambodia

- Khmer: ដែនជម្រកសត្វព្រៃភ្នំសំកុស
- IUCN category IV (habitat/species management area)
- Location within Cambodia
- Location: Primarily Pursat Province, Cambodia
- Nearest city: Pursat
- Coordinates: 12°16′17″N 102°58′36″E
- Area: 3,307.56 km^{2} (1,277.06 sq mi)
- Established: 1993
- Governing body: Ministry of Environment

Phnom Samkos Wildlife Sanctuary is a wildlife sanctuary in western Cambodia, bordering Thailand. The sanctuary was established in 1993 and covers 3,307.56 km^{2} (1,277.06 sq mi). It is also designated as an Important Bird Area (IBA).

Phnom Samkos Wildlife Sanctuary is located in the Cardamom Mountains and the area comprises mostly forested mountains, but with many different habitats and forest-types, and the landscape is dominated by three discrete peaks: Phnom Samkos (1,717 m (5,633 ft) and Cambodia's second highest peak), Phnom Khmaoch (1,496 m (4,908 ft)), and Phnom Tumpor (1,250 m (4,100 ft)).

== History ==
Historically, the sanctuary area has been inhabited by ethnic Por (or Pear), the namesake of the broader term Pearic people. In Cambodia, ethnic groups living in the highlands of the country are all referred to as Khmer Loeu.

== Flora and fauna ==
The sanctuary is notable for its large diversity of habitats, including several types of forests. The interior of the sanctuary is largely unexplored by scientists, but small-scale surveys suggests that many rare, unique and even endemic species are present. There is a rich diversity of primates and monkeys.

== Threats ==
The sanctuary has been under threat from illegal logging, including specific targeting of Cinnamomum parthenoxylon trees for use in the illegal drug market. Another threat is illegal hunting of wildlife.

== See also ==
- List of protected areas of Cambodia

== External ==
- Phnom Samkos Wildlife Sanctuary
- Wildlife and Livelihoods in the Cardamom Mountains, Cambodia
- Sustainable financing of protected areas in Cambodia: Phnom Aural and Phnom Samkos wildlife sanctuaries
- "Cardamom Mountains rain forests". Terrestrial Ecoregions. World Wildlife Fund.
- Map of Protected areas system in Cambodia
