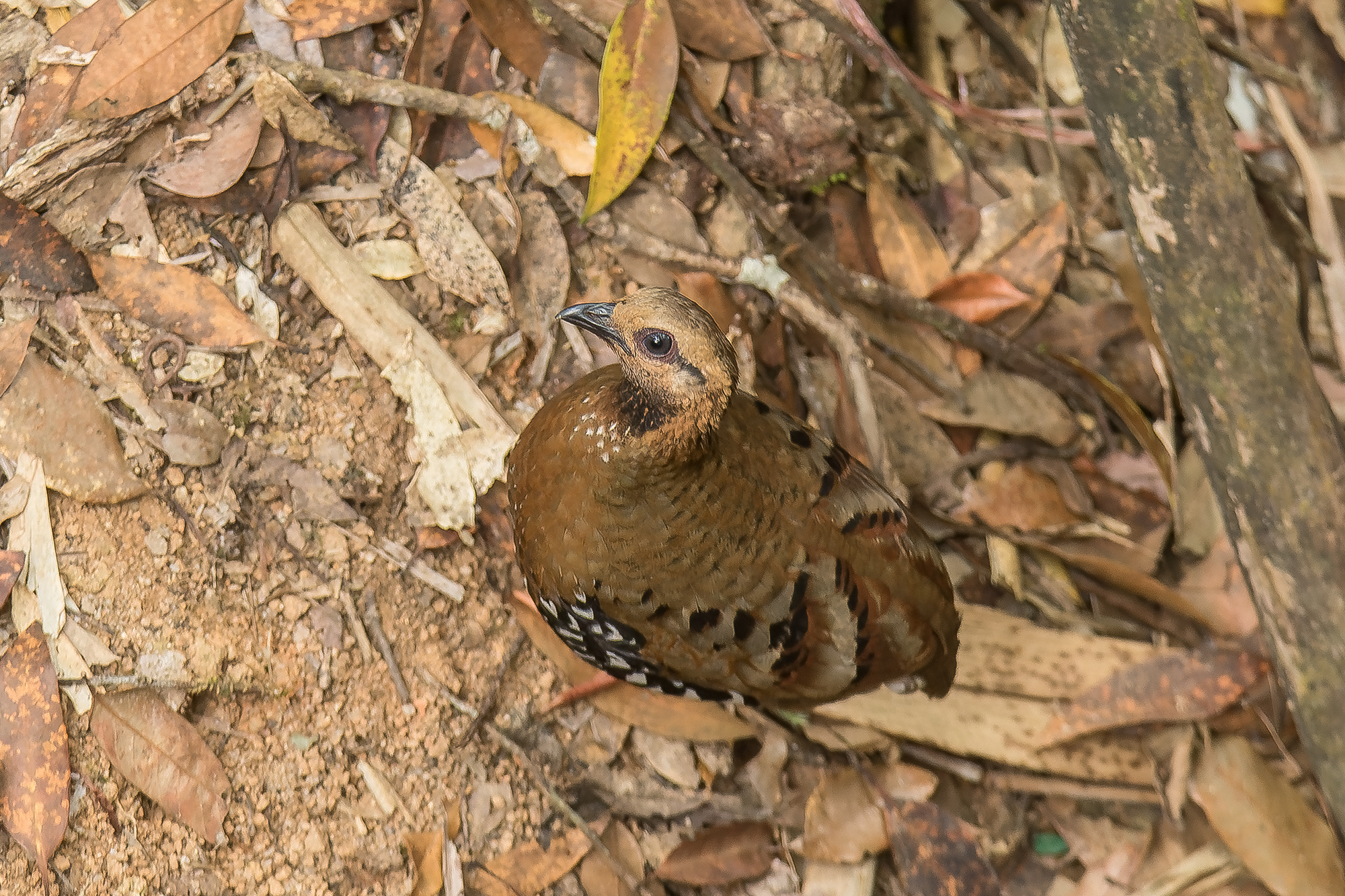

Conservation status
- Near Threatened (IUCN 3.1)

Scientific classification
- Kingdom: Animalia
- Phylum: Chordata
- Class: Aves
- Order: Galliformes
- Family: Phasianidae
- Genus: Arborophila
- Species: A. cambodiana

Binomial name
- Arborophila cambodiana Delacour & Jabouille, 1928

= Chestnut-headed partridge =

Species of bird

The chestnut-headed partridge (Arborophila cambodiana) is a bird species in the family Phasianidae. It is found in highland forest in Cambodia, specifically the Cardamom Mountains. The Siamese partridge, subspecies A. c. diversa, has sometimes been considered as a separate species.

== Taxonomy ==
The chestnut-headed partridge was formally described in 1928 by the French ornithologists Jean Théodore Delacour and Pierre Jabouille based on a specimen collected near Bokor in southern Cambodia. They placed the new species with the partridges in the genus Arborophila and coined the binomial name Arborophila cambodiana.

Three subspecies are recognised:

- A. c. diversa Riley, 1930 – southeast Thailand (Siamese partridge)
- A. c. chandamonyi Eames, JC & Steinheimer & Bansok, 2002 – southwest Cambodia
- A. c. cambodiana Delacour & Jabouille, 1928 – southeast Cambodia

The subspecies A. c. diversa has sometimes been considered as a separate species, the Siamese partridge.
