= Central Cardamom Mountains National Park =

National park in Cambodia

- Khmer: ឧទ្យានជាតិជួរភ្នំក្រវាញកណ្តាល
- Location within Cambodia
- Location: Koh Kong province, Pursat province and Kampong Speu province, Cambodia
- Coordinates: 11.937227°N 103.485260°E
- Area: 4,010.65 km^{2} (1,548.52 sq mi)
- Established: 1999
- Governing body: Ministry of Environment

The Central Cardamom Mountains National Park is a protected area in the central parts of Cambodia's Cardamom Mountains, covering 4,013.13 km^{2} (1,549.48 sq mi). It was established in 1999 as a protected forest under management by the Forestry Administration, and in 2016 the Ministry of Environment assumed responsibility.

The Central Cardamom Mountains National Park spans three provinces and is flanked east and west by Phnom Aural Wildlife Sanctuary and Phnom Samkos Wildlife Sanctuary respectively.

== Ecology ==
Central Cardamom Mountains National Park lies within the Cardamom Mountains rainforest landscape in southwestern Cambodia. The park spans an elevation range of about 20 to 1,540 m (66 to 5,052 ft) and is dominated by evergreen and semi-evergreen forest.

Habitats described from the park include dense monsoon forest, melaleuca wetlands and coastal habitats such as mangroves and estuaries. The park also contains a network of rivers draining toward the Gulf of Thailand.

Between 2000 and 2015, forest loss in Central Cardamom Mountains National Park was estimated at 1.2% in a landscape-level assessment, and no economic land concessions were listed within the park in that compilation.

The park has been described as providing habitat for more than 400 vertebrate species, 70 fish species and more than 200 plant species, including species endemic to the region. Species recorded from the park include the Asian elephant, Asiatic black bear, clouded leopard and pileated gibbon.

Across the wider Cardamom Rainforest Landscape, systematic camera trap surveys from 2012 to 2016 recorded at least 30 species of medium to large ground-dwelling mammals. Frequently detected species in that compilation included the sun bear, clouded leopard and dhole, and domestic dogs were detected across surveyed areas.

Camera-trap data collected in 2016 have been used to estimate leopard cat density and occupancy across different forest types in Central Cardamom Mountains National Park using spatial capture–recapture and occupancy modelling.

== Climate ==
Koh Kong

Climate chart (precipitation, max. and min. temperature)
J	F	M	A	M	J	J	A	S	O	N	D
34 31 22	87 32 22	103 32 23	270 33 23	480 34 25	562 33 24	567 32 23	592 32 23	490 32 23	320 31 23	104 31 22	58 31 22
- █ Average max. and min. temperatures in °C
- █ Precipitation totals in mm
- Source: World Weather Information Service.
Imperial conversion
J	F	M	A	M	J	J	A	S	O	N	D
1.3 89 71	3.4 89 72	4.1 90 74	11 92 74	19 92 76	22 91 75	22 90 74	23 89 74	19 89 73	13 88 73	4.1 88 72	2.3 87 72
- █ Average max. and min. temperatures in °F
- █ Precipitation totals in inches

Koh Kong province, which includes part of the park, has a tropical monsoon climate with distinct rainy and dry seasons. The rainy season normally runs from April to October, with precipitation highest from June to September. In Koh Kong, monthly maximum temperatures are about 30–34 °C and monthly minimum temperatures about 22–25 °C. Annual rainfall recorded at Koh Kong averaged about 3,633 mm over 2000–2005.

== History ==
The project area was a former Khmer Rouge stronghold with settlements of Indigenous people and former Khmer Rouge families. Wildlife sanctuary designations were little known locally during the early 2000s, and traditional use of forest resources was common; the area was also large and difficult to monitor.

The park area has been treated as part of the Cardamom Mountains protected area complex, which includes the Central Cardamoms Protected Forest and the Phnom Aural Wildlife Sanctuary and Phnom Samkos wildlife sanctuaries. Conservation initiatives in the early 2000s included a Central Cardamom Protected Forest project implemented by the Forestry Administration under the Ministry of Agriculture, Forestry and Fisheries with support from Conservation International (2001–2004), alongside a separate wildlife sanctuaries project implemented by the Ministry of Environment with support from Fauna & Flora International (2003–2007). The two sub-projects operated under different jurisdictions and start dates, and the wildlife sanctuaries work included management planning, operational capacity building, community engagement, awareness-raising and development of long-term financing mechanisms.

== Tourism ==
Tourism planning in the central Cardamoms has included proposals for small-scale ecotourism and user fees. Proposed activities have included a walking trail on Phnom Aural and birdwatching in Phnom Samkos Wildlife Sanctuary, with a gradual approach to visitation beginning with low-impact visits by students and researchers.

A national program supported by the United Nations Development Programme has aimed to promote ecotourism opportunities and conservation in the Cardamom Mountains–Tonlé Sap landscape.

== Human impacts ==
Logging, road building and settlement expanded in the Cardamom Mountains in the 1990s alongside agricultural concessions, and commercial hunting and wildlife trade increased in the post-conflict period.

Ranger patrols in the park in 2022 documented illegal land encroachment and illegal logging and confiscated and destroyed traps and snares and other equipment used in illegal activities.
