= Chi-Phat =

Commune of Thma Bang District, Koh Kong Province, Cambodia

The Chi-Phat commune (Khmer: ជីផាត, pronunciation: cheephat) is located deep within the Cardamom Mountains at Koh Kong Province, south-west Cambodia. The commune consists of four villages: Chi-Phat, Komlot, Chom-Sla and T'k La'o.

The commune population is estimated around 3,000 inhabitants (2010). The residents make their living mainly out of agriculture, fishing and tourism. Ecotourism efforts in recent years have made Chipat a popular destination for foreign visitors and local Cambodians alike.

This community-Based Ecotourism project is owned, managed and operated by the Chi Phat Community, and is facilitated with technical and financial support from Wildlife Alliance. Chi Phat is a community in the southern Cardamom Mountain. The Cardamom Mountain are the largest mainland rainforest of southeast Asia. A jewel among the 32 biodiversity hotspots of the planet, the mountain range is covered with emerald forests spanning from the mountaintops to the oceanfront, where a complex network of estuaries and mangroves feeds rich feeds fisheries. The magnificent wilderness is one of Asia's seven remaining elephant condors and is the home to the last wild population of Siamese crocodiles and Royal Turtles on the earth.
