= Phnom Tumpor =

- Location within Cambodia

Highest point
- Elevation: 1,551 m (5,089 ft)
- Coordinates: 12°22′00″N 103°04′00″E

Geography
- Location: Pursat Province, Cambodia
- Parent range: Cardamom Mountains

Phnom Tumpor (Khmer: ភ្នំទំព័រ; Tumpor Mountain) is a mountain in Pursat Province of western Cambodia. There is a village nearby named Tumpor that lies on the Stung Pouthisat River. The mountain is part of the Cardamom Range and has an elevation of 1,551 metres (5,089 ft).
