= Peam Krasop Wildlife Sanctuary =

Protected area in Koh Kong Province, Cambodia

- Khmer: ដែនជម្រកសត្វព្រៃពាមក្រសោប
- IUCN category IV (habitat/species management area)
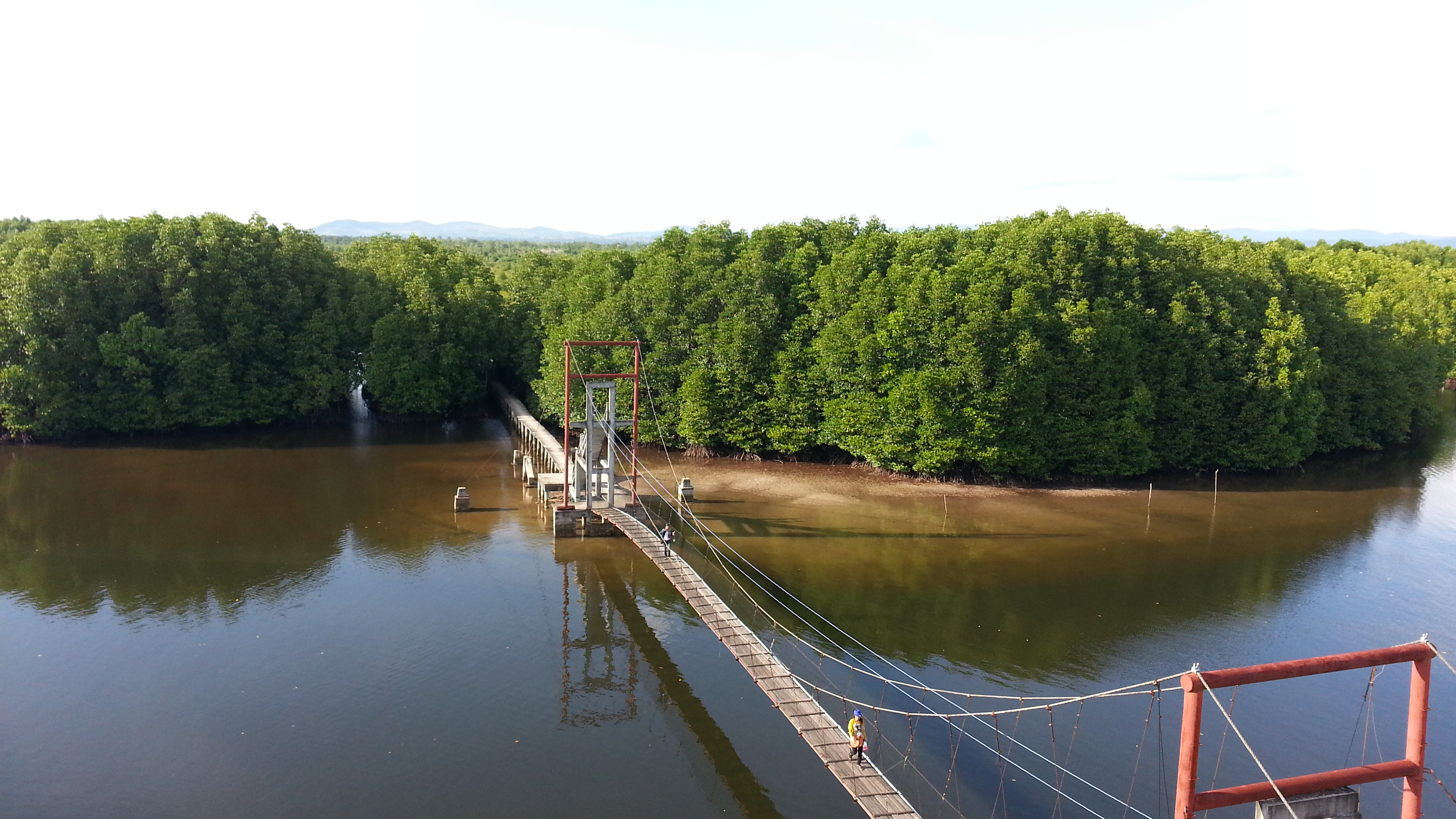
- Mangrove forest and pedestrian bridge.

- Location within Cambodia
- Location: Koh Kong Province, Cambodia
- Coordinates: 11°30′31″N 103°05′50″E
- Area: 245.91 km^{2} (94.95 sq mi)
- Established: 1993
- Governing body: Ministry of Environment

Peam Krasop Wildlife Sanctuary is a protected area located in southwestern Cambodia, covering 245.91 km^{2} (94.95 sq mi). It was established in 1993.

The area is known for its mangroves and numerous islands separated by a maze of bays and channels. It boasts a unique mangrove ecosystem consisting of 23,750 hectares and has around 10,000 people living within its borders. The area is influenced by inter-tidal levels and water from highland areas. Peam Krasaop Wildlife Sanctuary provides favorable conditions for fishery and other resources. Many people have resided on and done various occupations for their livelihoods and are dependent upon the natural resources in the area, including intensive shrimp aquaculture, large-scale charcoal production, and other purposes.

== Boeng Kayak Settlement ==
The main gateway to Peam Krasaop Wildlife Sanctuary is the settlement of Boeng Kayak (Bankayak), where the local community has built a one-kilometer mangrove walk that consists of a series of elevated walkways, picnic platforms, a suspension bridge and a 15-meter-high observation tower offering panoramic views.

An entry fee is required for access into Boeng Kayak: foreigners pay 5000 riel (US$1.25) while Cambodians pay 3000 riel (US$0.75).

== Environmental Concerns ==
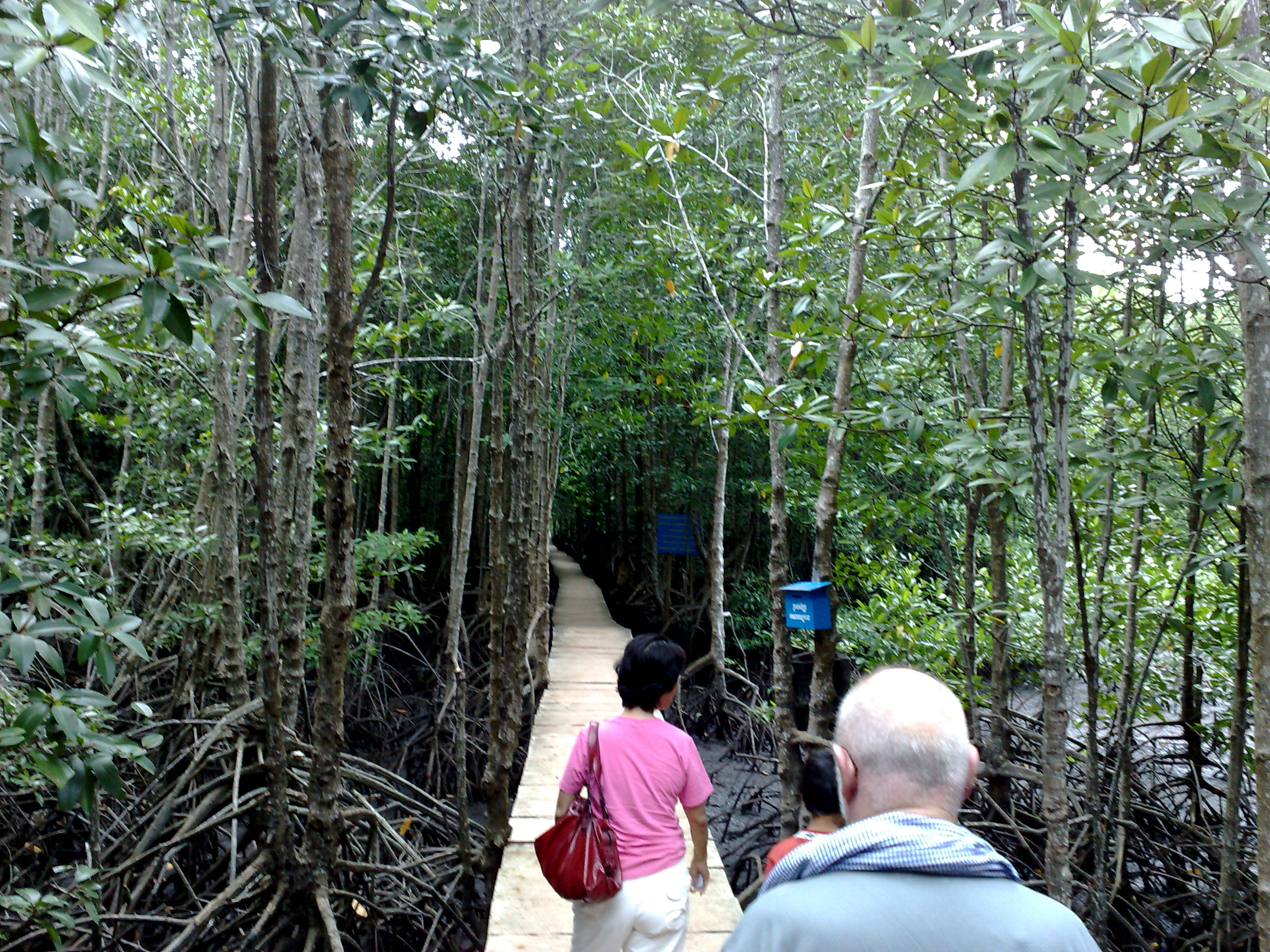
Boardwalk in the mangrove forest

Although Peam Krasaop Wildlife Sanctuary is protected under the Ramsar Convention there are concerns about the destruction of mangrove forests and the clearing of coastal swamp forest for shrimp farming. These activities are having severe negative influence on wildlife habitat. Although the Cambodian legislative framework relating to environmental protection and biodiversity conservation continues to strengthen, law enforcement and effective implementation of national action plans remains a concern. However, with political stability and increasing government willingness to enforce the laws, the situation is improving.
