= Ural (rural locality) =

Index of articles associated with the same name

Ural (Russian: Ура́л) is the name of several rural localities in Russia:

- Ural, Baymaksky District, Republic of Bashkortostan, a village in Zilairsky Selsoviet of Baymaksky District in the Republic of Bashkortostan
- Ural, Buzdyaksky District, Republic of Bashkortostan, a village in Karansky Selsoviet of Buzdyaksky District in the Republic of Bashkortostan
- Ural, Gafuriysky District, Republic of Bashkortostan, a village in Yangiskainsky Selsoviet of Gafuriysky District in the Republic of Bashkortostan
- Ural, Karmaskalinsky District, Republic of Bashkortostan, a village in Karlamansky Selsoviet of Karmaskalinsky District in the Republic of Bashkortostan
- Ural, Kushnarenkovsky District, Republic of Bashkortostan, a village in Rasmekeyevsky Selsoviet of Kushnarenkovsky District in the Republic of Bashkortostan
- Ural, Uchalinsky District, Republic of Bashkortostan, a village in Imangulovsky Selsoviet of Uchalinsky District in the Republic of Bashkortostan
- Ural, Yanaulsky District, Republic of Bashkortostan, a village in Yamadinsky Selsoviet of Yanaulsky District in the Republic of Bashkortostan
- Ural, Chelyabinsk Oblast, a settlement in Uralsky Selsoviet of Kizilsky District in Chelyabinsk Oblast
- Ural, Krasnoyarsk Krai, a settlement in Uralsky Selsoviet of Rybinsky District of Krasnoyarsk Krai
- Ural, Kurgan Oblast, a village in Uralsky Selsoviet of Vargashinsky District in Kurgan Oblast; 55°50′N 66°11′E
- Ural, Orenburg Oblast, a settlement in Uralsky Selsoviet of Kuvandyksky District in Orenburg Oblast
- Ural, Yutazinsky District, Republic of Tatarstan, a settlement in Yutazinsky District of the Republic of Tatarstan
- Ural, Zainsky District, Republic of Tatarstan, a settlement in Zainsky District of the Republic of Tatarstan

== See also ==
- Uralsk, several rural localities in Russia
- Uralsky (inhabited locality), several inhabited localities in Russia
