= Ural =

Ural may refer to:

== Physical geography ==
- Ural (region), in Russia and Kazakhstan
- Ural Mountains, in Russia and Kazakhstan
- Ural (river), in Russia and Kazakhstan
- Ural Ocean, an ancient ocean
- 14519 Ural, an asteroid

== Human geography ==
- Ural District (disambiguation)
- Ural Oblast (disambiguation)
- Ural (region)
- Ural economic region, in Russia
- Ural (rural locality), several rural localities in Russia

== Transport ==
- Ural Airlines, a Russian airline based in Yekaterinburg
- Ural Automotive Plant (brand name "Ural"):
  - Ural-375D, a military truck manufactured by Ural Automotive Plant
  - Ural-4320, a military truck manufactured by Ural Automotive Plant
  - Ural-5323, a military truck manufactured by Ural Automotive Plant
- Ural 63055 and Ural-63059, variants of Ural Typhoon, a Russian armored vehicle
- Ural bomber, aircraft design program to design a long-range bomber for Luftwaffe
- IMZ-Ural, a Russian motorcycle manufacturer
- Ural (ship), three Russian ships

== People ==
- Esra Ural (born 1991), Turkish women's basketball player
- Fulden Ural (born 1991), Turkish women's volleyball player
- Göktürk Gökalp Ural (born 1995), Turkish basketball player
- Mihrac Ural (born 1956), Turkish militant
- Murat Ural (born 1987), Swiss soccer player
- Onur Ural (born 1997), Turkish football player
- Ural Akbulut (born 1945), Turkish chemist
- Ural Alexis Johnson (1908–1997), American diplomat
- Ural Amirov (born 1980), Russian football player
- Ural Latypov (born 1951), Belarusian politician
- Ural Rakhimov (born 1961), Russian businessman
- Ural Tansykbayev (1904–1974), Uzbek painter
- Ural Thomas (born 1939), American singer

== Sports ==
- PBC Ural Great Perm, a basketball club in Perm, Russia
- FC Ural, an association football club in Russia
- Ural Ufa, a volleyball club in Ufa, Russia

== Other uses ==
- Ural (computer)
- 14519 Ural, an asteroid
- Ual (tool), a mortar tool used by the Bodo people of India
- Ural Bey, an antagonist in Diriliş: Ertuğrul
- Ural (almanac), a Soviet magazine
- The Urals (game), a boardgame

== See also ==
- Uralic (disambiguation), for Uralic peoples and their culture
- Uralsky (disambiguation)
- Uralsk, several rural localities in Russia
- Urals oil, a reference oil brand
- Eural (disambiguation)
- Oral (disambiguation)
