= Aural (disambiguation) =

Aural is an adjective: of or pertaining to the ear or sound.

Aural may also refer to:

- Aural District, a district of Cambodia located in Kampong Speu province
  - Phnom Aural, a mountain in Cambodia
- Laura Sippola (born 1974), Finnish musician also known as AURAL

== See also ==
- Oral (disambiguation)
