= Amirov =

Amirov (Azerbaijani: Əmirov, Cyrillic: Амиров) is a central-Asian masculine surname, its feminine counterpart is Amirova. Notable people with the surname include:

- Ajmal Amirov (born 1985), Tajikistani middle-distance runner
- Artur Amirov (born 1992), Russian ice hockey player
- Asad bey Amirov (1889–1939), Azerbaijani politician
- Azad bey Amirov (1883–1939), Azerbaijani educator
- Fikret Amirov (1922–1984), Soviet composer
- Gulzoda Amirova (born 1999), Uzbekistani football midfielder
- Ildar Amirov (born 1987), Kyrgyzstani association football player
- Mashadi Jamil Amirov (1875–1928), Azerbaijani musician and composer
- Museyib Amirov (born 1963), Azerbaijani painter
- Rodion Amirov (2001–2023), Russian ice hockey player
- Rufat Amirov, Azerbaijani military officer
- Ruslan Amirov (born 1990), Kyrgyzstani association football goalkeeper
- Samira Amirova (born 1998), Uzbekistani rhythmic gymnast
- Said Amirov (born 1954), Russian economist, politician and convicted criminal
- Ural Amirov (born 1980), Russian association football player
- Zamira Amirova (born 1979), Uzbekistani middle-distance runner
