= Geography of Cambodia =

- Continent: Asia
- Region: Southeast Asia
- Coordinates: 13°00′N 105°00′E
- Area: Ranked 88th
  - Total: 181,035 km^{2} (69,898 sq mi)
  - Land: 97.50%
  - Water: 2.50%
- Coastline: 443 km (275 mi)
- Borders: 2,530 km (1,572 mi); Laos 555 km (345 mi); Thailand 817 km (508 mi); Vietnam 1,158 km (720 mi)
- Highest point: Phnom Aural; 1,813 m (5,948 ft)
- Lowest point: Gulf of Thailand; 0 m (0 ft)
- Longest river: Mekong river 500 km (311 mi)
- Largest lake: Tonlé Sap; 16,000 km^{2} (6,178 sq mi)

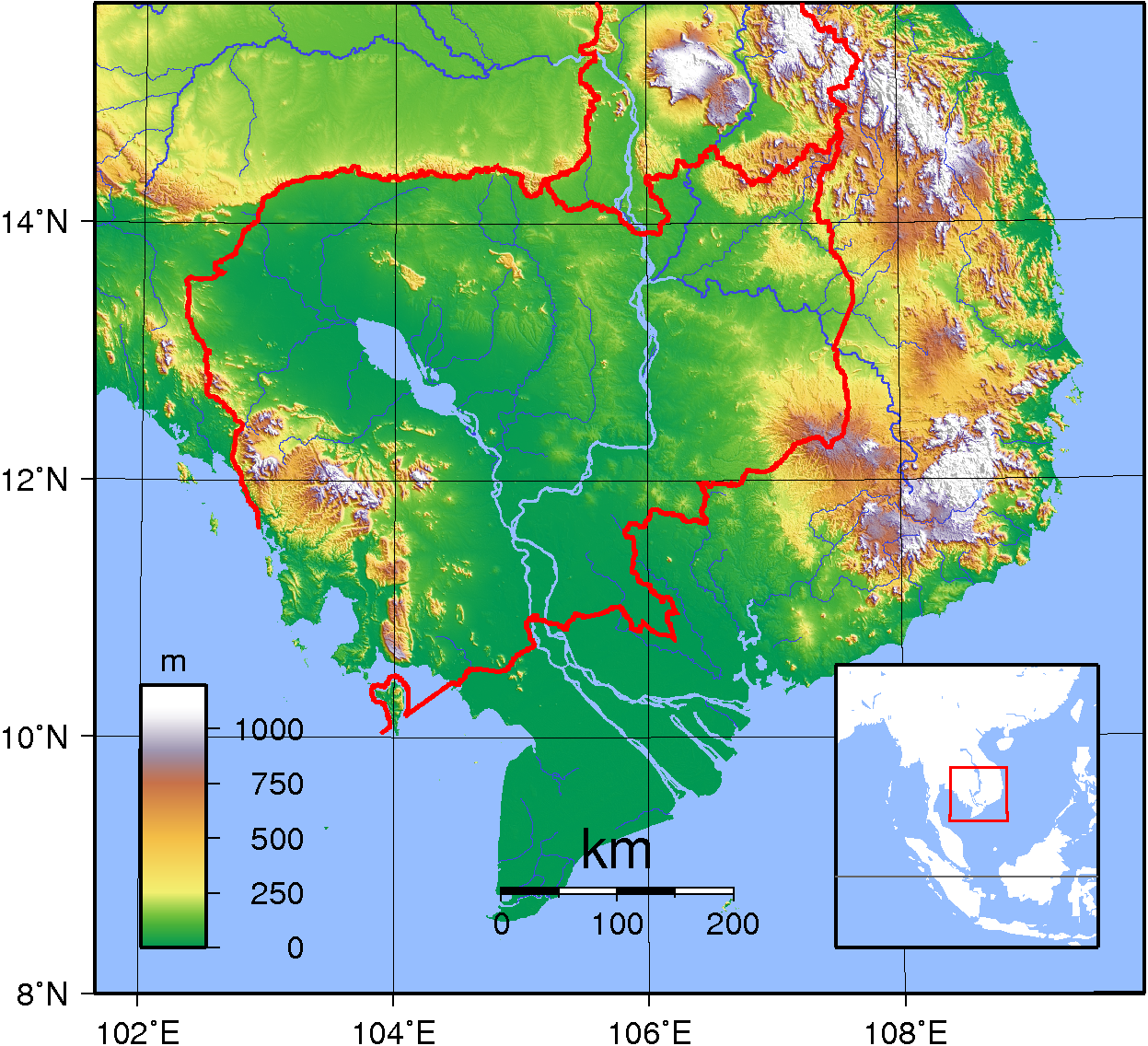
Topography of Cambodia

Cambodia is a country in mainland Southeast Asia. It borders Thailand, Laos, Vietnam, the Gulf of Thailand and covers a total area of approximately 181,035 km^{2} (69,898 sq mi). The country is situated in its entirety inside the tropical Indomalayan realm and the Indochina Time zone (ICT).

Cambodia's main geographical features are the low lying Central Plain that includes the Tonlé Sap basin, the lower Mekong River flood-plains and the Bassac River plain surrounded by mountain ranges to the north, east, in the south-west and south. The central lowlands extend into Vietnam to the south-east. The south and south-west of the country constitute a 443 km (275 mi) long coast at the Gulf of Thailand, characterized by sizable mangrove marshes, peninsulas, sandy beaches and headlands and bays. Cambodia's territorial waters account for over 50 islands. The highest peak is Phnom Aural, sitting 1,810 metres (5,938 ft) above sea level.

The landmass is bisected by the Mekong River, which at 486 km (302 mi) is the longest river in Cambodia. After extensive rapids, turbulent sections and cataracts in Laos, the river enters the country at Stung Treng province, is predominantly calm and navigable during the entire year as it widens considerably in the lowlands. The Mekong's waters disperse into the surrounding wetlands of central Cambodia and strongly affect the seasonal nature of the Tonlé Sap lake.

Two third of the country's population live in the lowlands, where the rich sediment deposited during the Mekong's annual flooding makes the agricultural lands highly fertile. As deforestation and over-exploitation affected Cambodia only in recent decades, forests, low mountain ranges and local eco-regions still retain much of their natural potential and although still home to the largest areas of contiguous and intact forests in mainland Southeast Asia, multiple serious environmental issues persist and accumulate, which are closely related to rapid population growth, uncontrolled globalization and inconsequential administration.

The majority of the country lies within the Tropical savanna climate zone, as the coastal areas in the South and West receive noticeably more and steady rain before and during the wet season. These areas constitute the easternmost fringes of the south-west monsoon, determined to be inside the Tropical monsoon climate. Countrywide there are two seasons of relatively equal length, defined by varying precipitation as temperatures and humidity are generally high and steady throughout the entire year.

== Geological development ==
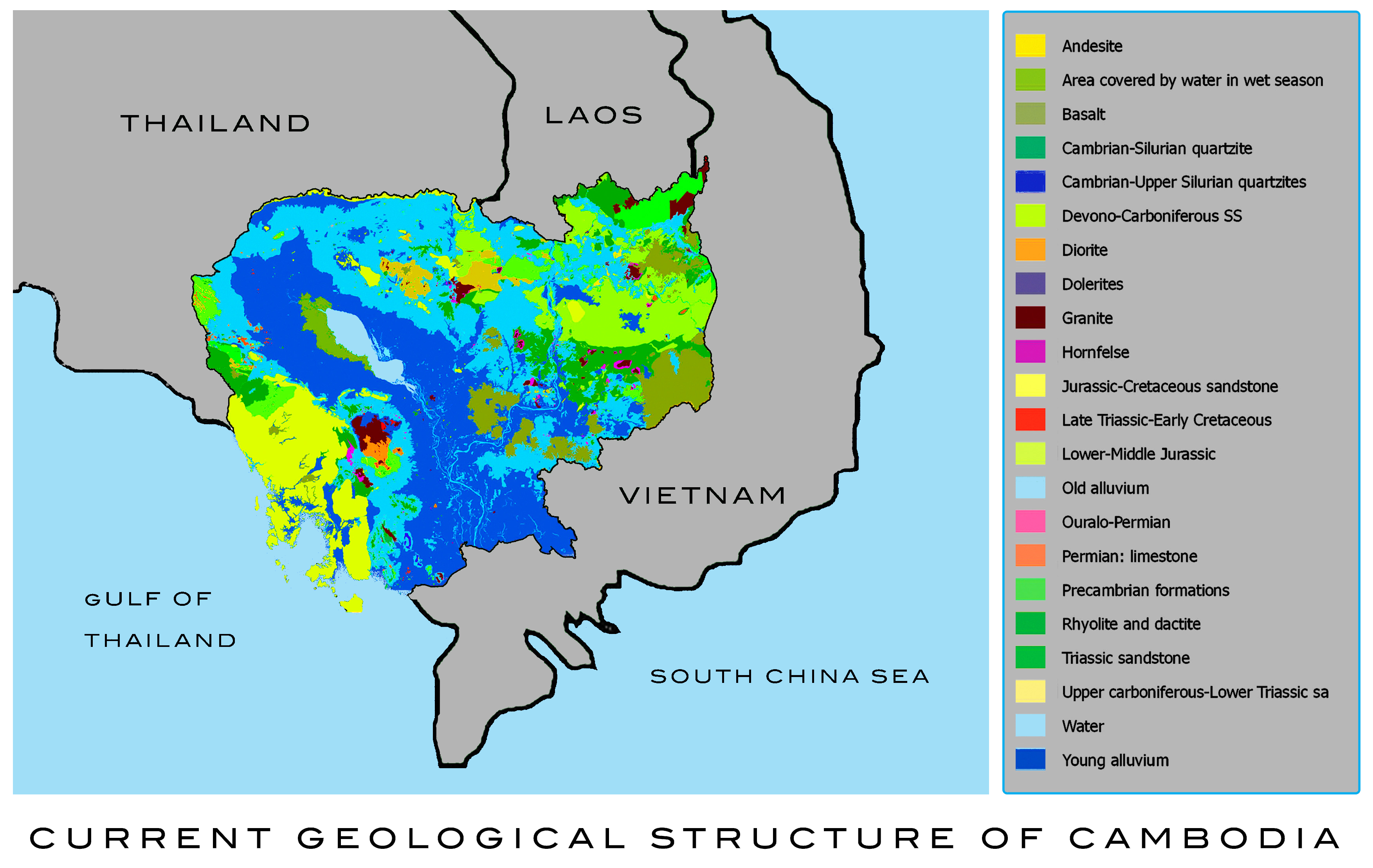

Mainland Southeast Asia consists of allochthonous continental blocks from Gondwanaland. These include the South China, Indochina, Sibumasu, and West Burma blocks, which amalgamated to form the Southeast Asian continent during the Paleozoic and Mesozoic periods.

The current geological structure of South China and South-East Asia is determined to be the response to the "Indo-sinian" collision in South-East Asia during the Carboniferous. The Indo-Sinian orogeny was followed by extension of the Indo-Chinese block, the formation of rift basins and thermal subsidence during the early Triassic.

The Indochina continental block, which is separated from the South China Block by the Jinshajiang-Ailaoshan Suture zone, is an amalgamation of the Viet-Lao, Khorat-Kontum, Uttaradit (UTD), and Chiang Mai-West Kachin terranes, all of which are separated by suture zones or ductile shear zones. The Khorat-Kontum terrane, which includes western Laos, Cambodia and southern Vietnam, consists of the Kontum metamorphic complex, Paleozoic shallow marine deposits, upper Permian arc volcanic rocks and Mesozoic terrigenous sedimentary rocks.

The central plains consist mainly of Quaternary sands, loam and clay, as most of the northern mountain regions and the coastal region are largely composed of Cretaceous granite, Triassic stones and Jurassic sandstone formations.

== General topography ==
Geographic map of Cambodia

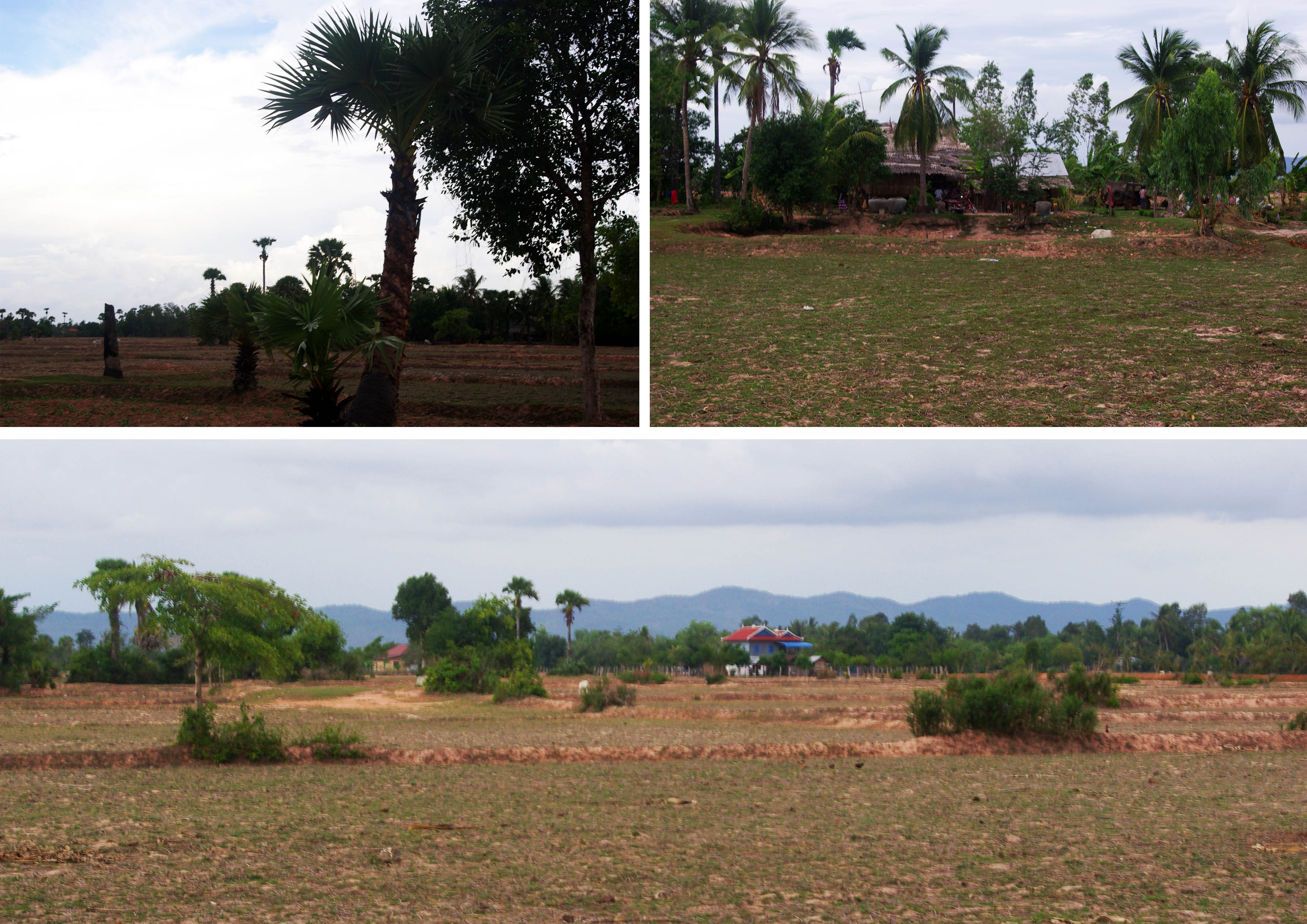
Cultivated lowlands in rural Takéo Province at the end of the dry season, May 2010

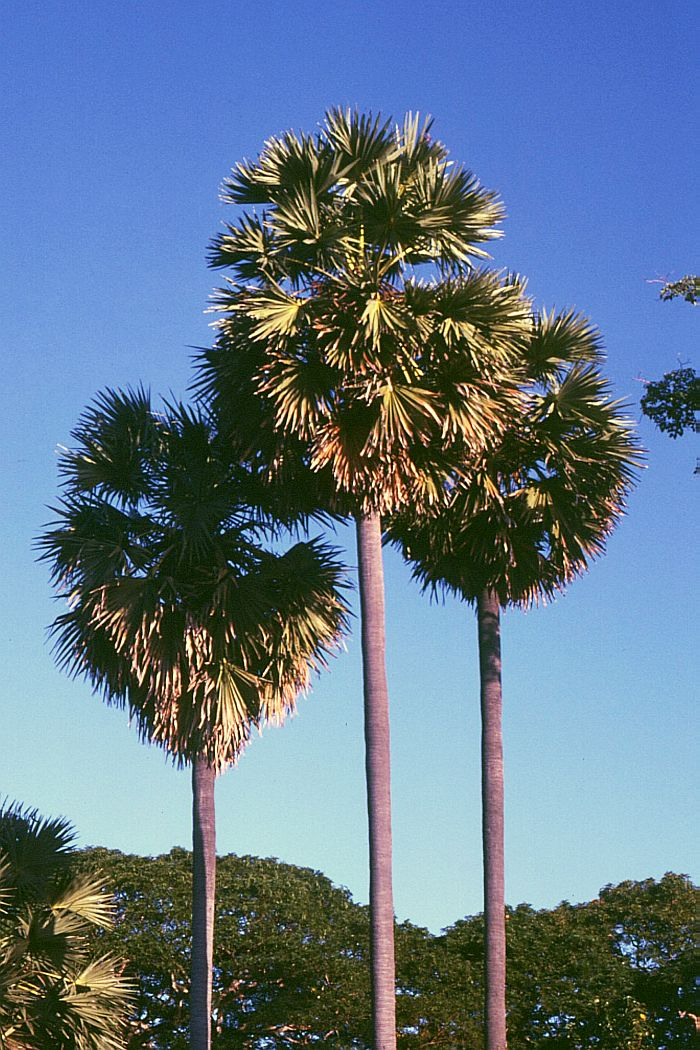
Borassus flabellifer - sugar palm

Bowl- or saucer-shaped, Cambodia covers 181,035 km^{2} (69,898 sq mi) in the south-western part of the Indochinese peninsula as its landmass and marine territory is situated entirely within the tropics.

The bowl's bottom represents Cambodia's interior, about 75 percent, consisting of alluvial flood-plains of the Tonlé Sap basin, the lower Mekong River and the Bassac River plain, whose waters feed the large and almost centrally located wetlands. As humans preferably settle in these fertile and easily accessible central lowlands, major transformations and widespread cultivation through wet-rice agriculture have over the centuries shaped the landscape into distinctive regional cultivated lands.

Domestic plants, such as sugar palms, Coconut trees and banana groves almost exclusively skirt extensive rice paddies, as natural vegetation is confined to elevated lands and near waterways. The Mekong traverses the north to south-east portions of the country, where the low-lying plains extend into Vietnam and reach the South China Sea at the Mekong Delta region.

Cambodia's low mountain ranges - representing the walls of the bowl - remain as the result of only rather recent substantial infrastructural development and economic exploitation - in particular in remote areas - formidably forested. The country is fringed to the north by the Dangrek Mountains plateau, bordering Thailand and Laos, to the north-east by the Annamite Range, in the south-west by the Cardamom Mountains and in the South by the Elephant Mountains. Highlands to the north-east and to the east merge into the Central Highlands and the Mekong Delta lowlands of Vietnam.

A heavily indented coastline at the Gulf of Thailand of 443 km (275 mi) length and 60 offshore islands, that dot the territorial waters and locally merge with tidal mangrove marshes - the environmental basis for a range of marine and coastal eco-regions.

=== Soils ===
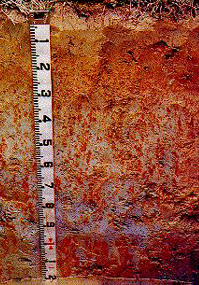
Low fertile Acrisol

"Sandy materials cover a large proportion of the landscape of Cambodia, on account of the siliceous sedimentary formations that underlie much of the Kingdom. Mesozoic sandstone dominates most of the basement geology in Cambodia and hence has a dominating influence on the properties of upland soils. Arenosols (sandy soils featuring very weak or no soil development) are mapped on only 1.6% of the land area."

"Sandy surface textures are more prevalent than the deep sandy soils that fit the definition for Arenosols. Sandy textured profiles are common amongst the most prevalent soil groups, including Acrisols and Leptosols. The Acrisols are the most prevalent soil group occupying the lowlands - nearly half of the land area of Cambodia. Low fertility and toxic amounts of aluminium pose limitations to its agricultural use, crops that can be successfully cultivated include rubber tree, oil palm, coffee and sugar cane. The main subgroups are: Gleyic Acrisols (20.5%, Haplic Acrisols (13.3%), Plinthic Acrisol (8.7%) and Ferric Acrisol (6.3%)."

=== Geographical extremes ===
- Northernmost point: Ta Veaeng District, Rattanakiri Province (14°41′N 107°32′E)
- Southernmost point: Koh Poulo Wai, Kampot Province (9°54′N 102°53′E)
- Easternmost point: Ou Ya Dav District, Rattanakiri Province (13°22′N 107°37′E)
- Westernmost point: Malai District, Banteay Meanchey Province (13°53′N 102°33′E)

== Regions ==
=== Central plain ===
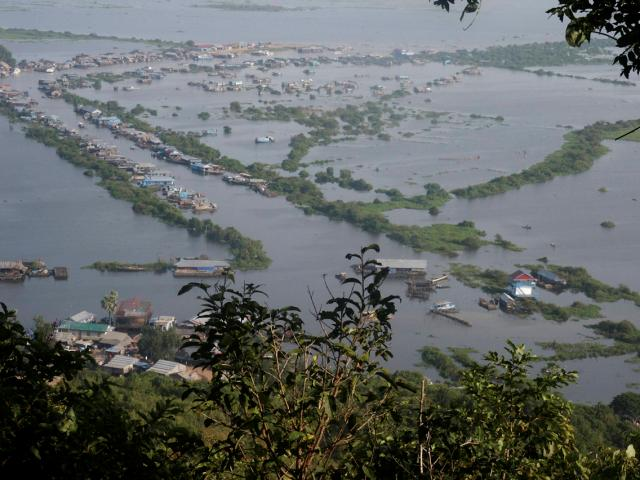
Extensive flooding in central Cambodia

The vast alluvial and lacustrine interconnected Cambodian flood-plain is a geologically relatively recent depression where the sediments of the Mekong and its tributaries accumulate as waters are subject to frequent course changes. The area covers 25,069 km^{2} (9,679 sq mi). The Tonlé Sap lake and - river system occupies the lowest area. The Tonlé Sap River is a waterway that branches off the Mekong near Phnom Penh in the north-westerly direction and meets the Tonle Sap lake after around 115 km (71 mi). Its waters' flow reverses direction every year, caused by greatly varying amounts of water carried by the Mekong over the course of a year and the impact of monsoonal rains, that coincides with the river's maximum.

The plains of the Mekong and Tonle Sap basin are confined in the North by the Dangrek and Central Annamite Mountains, and to the South by the Cardamom Mountains and Elephant Mountains. The plains completely surround the Tonle Sap Lake in the western half of the country and wind their way through the middle of the country following the course of the Mekong River. The two basins actually form a single body of water, the whole of which effects about 75% of Cambodia’s land cover.

=== Flow reversal ===
The volume of Tonle Sap Lake over the course of one year

The Mekong river and its tributaries increase water volumes in spring (May) on the northern hemisphere, mainly caused by melting snows. As the Mekong enters Cambodia (over 95% of its waters have already joined the river) it widens and inundates large areas.

"There is extreme hydrodynamic complexity in both time and space and it becomes impossible to measure channel discharge. Water levels, not flow rates and volumes, determine the movement of water across the landscape."

The plain's deepest point - the Tonle Sap - flooded area varies from a low of around 2,700 km^{2} (1,000 mi^{2}) with a depth of around 1 meter at the end of the dry season (April) to 26,000 km^{2} (10,000 mi^{2}) and a depth of up to 9 meters in October/November. This figure rose to 45,000 km^{2} (17,000 mi^{2}) during 2000 when some of the worst flood conditions recorded caused over 800 deaths in Cambodia and Vietnam.

Inflow starts in May/June with maximum rates of flow of around 10,000 m^{3}/s by late August and ends in October/November, amplified by precipitation of the annual monsoon. In November the lake reaches its maximum size. The annual monsoon coincides to cease around this time of the year. As the Mekong river begins its minimum around this time of the year and its water level falls deeper than the inundated Tonle Sap lake, Tonle Sap river and surrounding wetlands, waters of the lake's basin now drains via the Tonle Sap river into the Mekong.

As a result the Tonle Sap River (length around 115 km (71 mi)) flows 6 months a year from South-East (Mekong) to North-West (lake) and 6 month a year in the opposite direction. The mean annual reverse flow volume in the Tonle Sap is 30 km^{3} (7.2 mi^{3}), or about half of the maximum lake volume. A further 10% is estimated to enter the system by overland flow from the Mekong. The Mekong branches off into several arms near Phnom Penh and reaches Vietnamese territory south of Koh Thom and Loek Daek districts of Kandal Province.

=== Southern Mountains ===
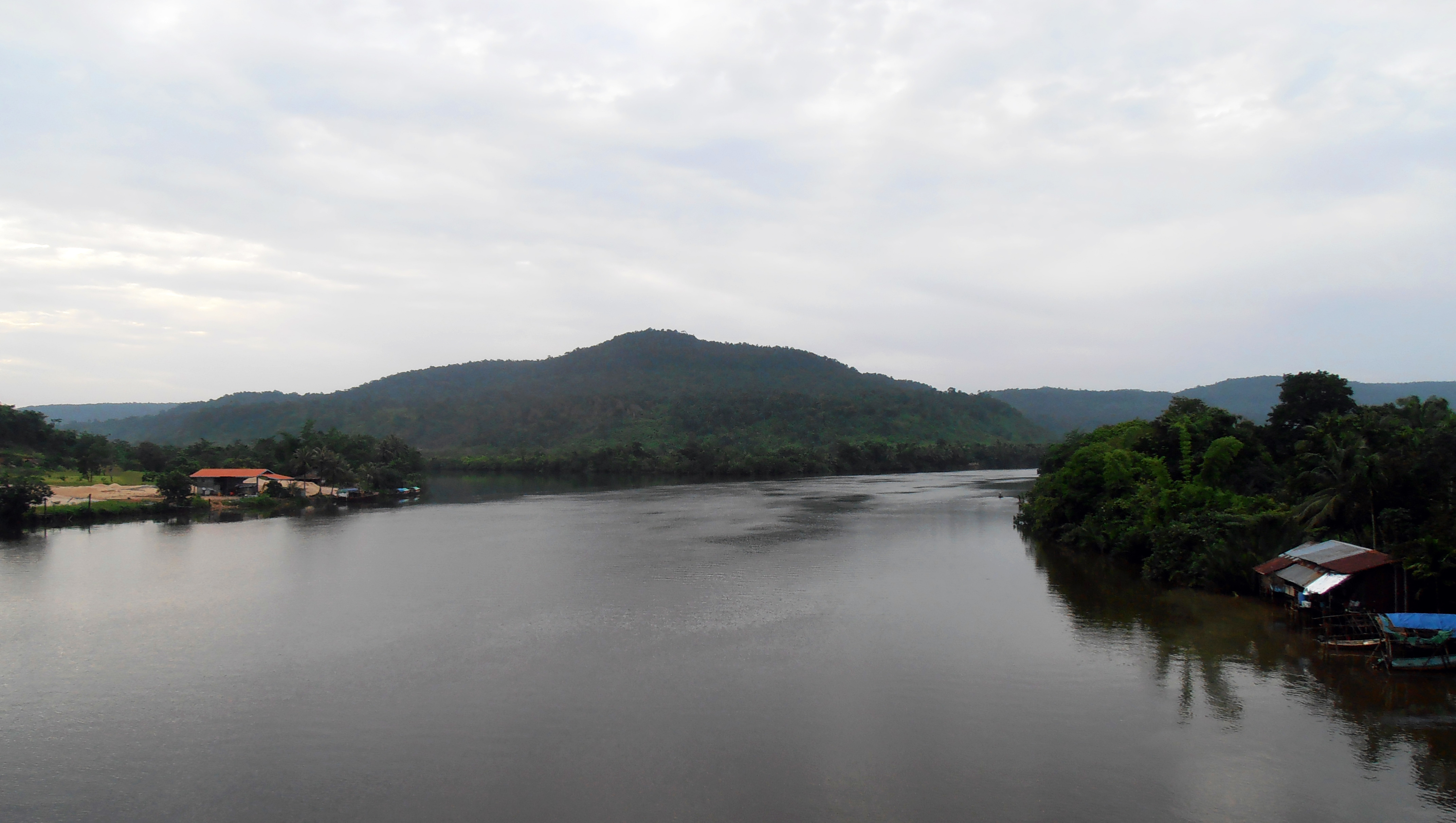
Tatai River, draining the southern slopes of the Cardamom Mountains

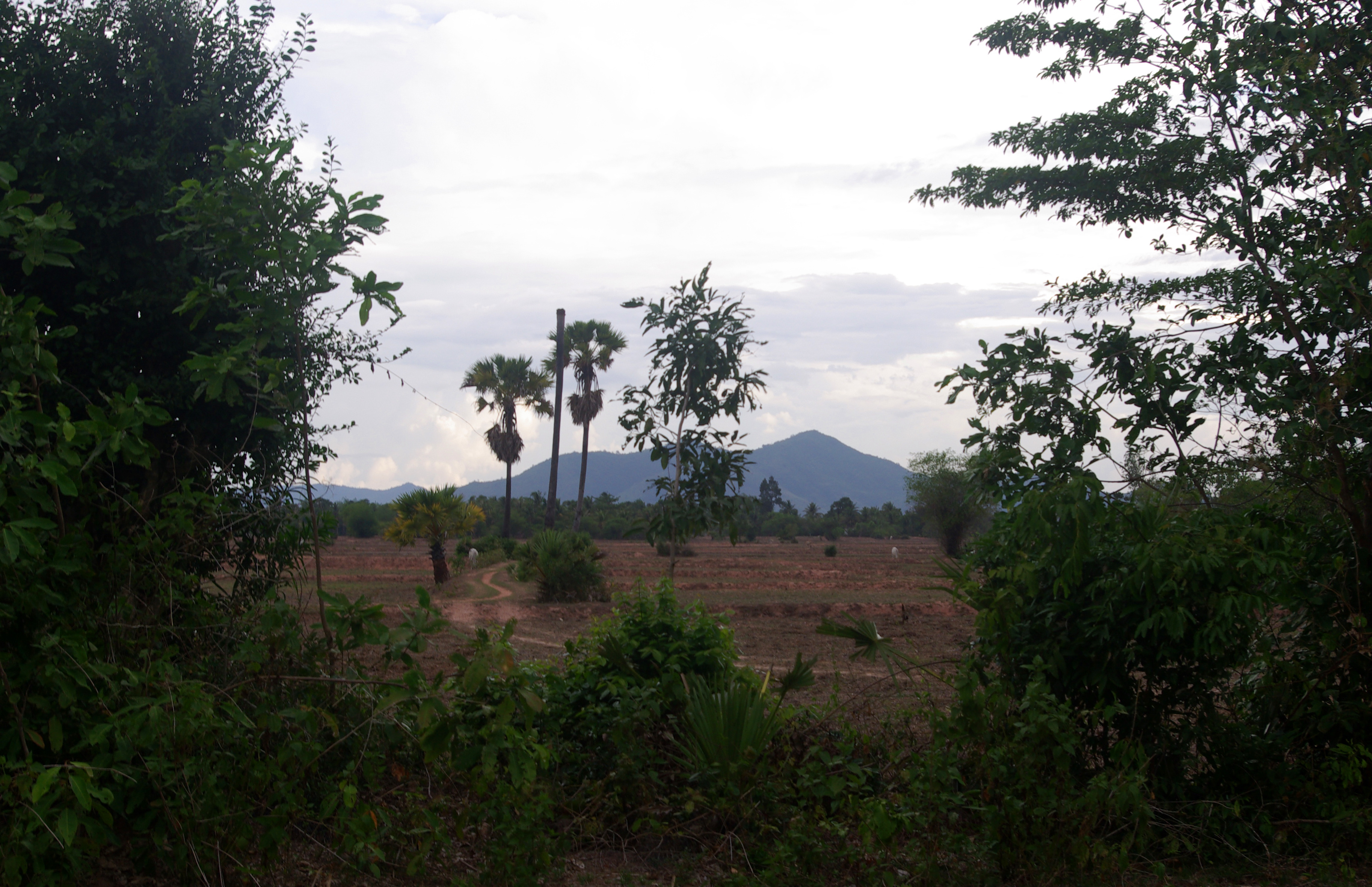
Kampot Province, countryside with remote Elephant Mountains

This region represents the eastern parts of the original extent of the wet evergreen forests that cover the Cardamom - and Elephant Mountains in South-West Cambodia and along the mountains east of Bangkok in Thailand.

The densely wooded hills receive rainfall of 3,000 to 5,000 mm (120 to 200 in) annually on their western slopes (which are subject to the South-West monsoons) but only 1,020 to 1,520 mm (40 to 60 in) on their eastern - rain shadow - slopes.

The Cardamom/Krâvanh Mountains

Occupying Koh Kong Province and Kampong Speu Province, running in a north-western to south-eastern direction and rising to more than 1,500 m (4,900 ft). The highest mountain of Cambodia, Phnom Aural, at 1,810 m (5,940 ft) is located in Aoral District in Kampong Speu Province. The Cardamom Mountains form - including the north-western part of Chanthaburi Province, Thailand, the 'Soi Dao Mountains' - the Cardamom Mountains Moist Forests Ecoregion, that is considered to be one of the most species-rich and intact natural habitats in the region. The climate, size inaccessibility and seclusion of the mountains have allowed a rich variety of wildlife to thrive. The Cardamom and Elephant Mountains remain to be fully researched and documented.

The Elephant Mountains

Chuŏr Phnum Dâmrei - A north-south-trending range of high hills, an extension of the Cardamom/Krâvanh Mountains, in south-eastern Cambodia, rising to elevations of between 500 and 1,000 meters. Extending 110 km (68 mi) north from the Gulf of Thailand, they reach a high point in the Bok Koŭ ridge at Mount Bokor 1,081 m (3,547 ft) near the sea.

To the south-west of the Southern mountain ranges extends a narrow coastal plain that contains the Kampong Saom Bay area and the Sihanoukville peninsula, facing the Gulf of Thailand.

=== Northern Mountains ===
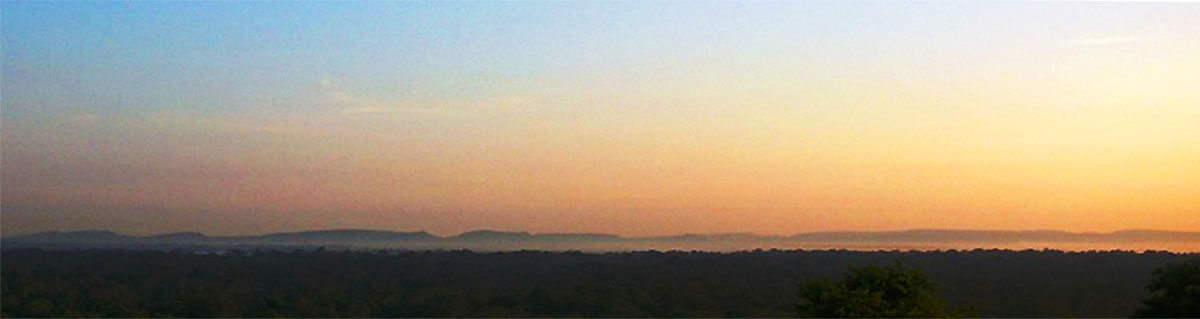
Dângrêk Mountains panorama, seen from Cambodia (south)

The Dangrek Mountains

A forested range of hills averaging 450 to 600 m (1,480 to 1,970 ft), dividing Thailand from Cambodia, mainly formed of massive sandstone with slate and silt. A few characteristic basalt hills are located on the northern side of the mountain chain. This east–west-trending range extends from the Mekong River westward for approximately 320 km (200 mi), merging with the highland area near San Kamphaeng, Thailand. Essentially the southern escarpment of the sandstone Khorat Plateau of northeastern Thailand, the Dângrêk range slopes gradually northward to the Mun River in Thailand but falls more abruptly in the south to the Cambodian plain. Its highest point is 761 m (2,497 ft).

The watershed along the escarpment in general terms marks the boundary between Thailand and Cambodia, however there are exceptions. The region is covered in dry evergreen forest, mixed dipterocarp forest, and deciduous dipterocarp forests. Tree species like Pterocarpus macrocarpus, Shorea siamensis and Xylia xylocarpa var. kerrii dominate. Illegal logging are issues on both, the Thai as well as on the Cambodian side, leaving large hill stretches denuded, vulnerable tree species such as Dalbergia cochinchinensis have been affected. Forest fires are common during the dry season.

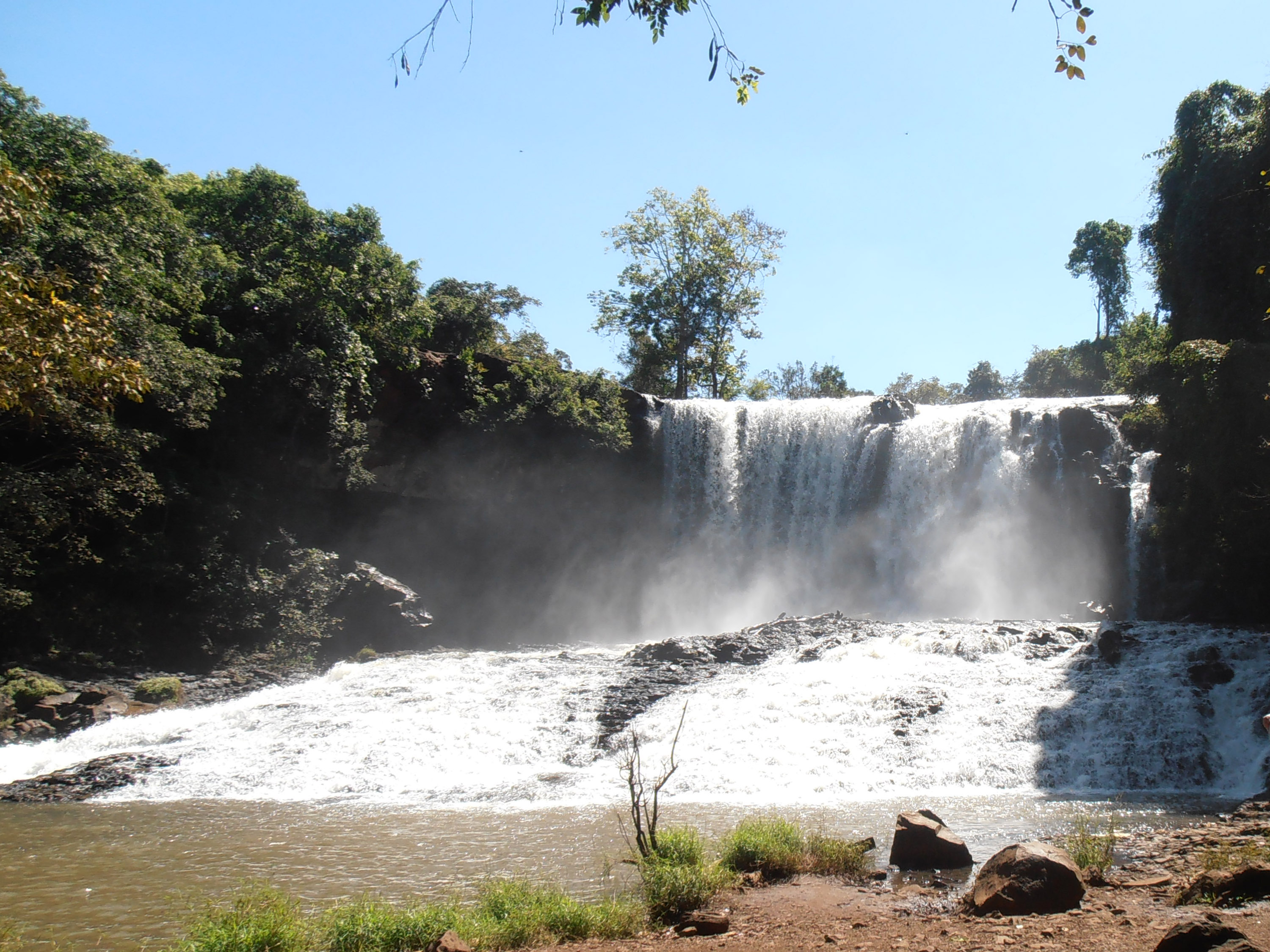
Chrey Thom Waterfall Mondulkiri Province

Annamite Range

Lying to the east of the Mekong River, the long chain of mountains called the Annamite Mountains of Indochina and the lowlands that surround them make up the Greater Annamites ecoregion. Levels of rainfall vary from 1,500 to 3,850 mm (59 to 152 in) annually. Mean annual temperatures are about 20 °C (68 °F). This eco-region contains some of the last relatively intact moist forests in Indochina. Moisture-laden monsoon winds, that blow in from the Gulf of Tonkin ensure permanent high air humidity. Plants and animals adapted to moist conditions, to seek refuge here and evolve into highly specialized types that are found nowhere else on Earth.

Ethnically diverse More than 30 ethnic groups of indigenous people live in the Annamites, each with their distinctive and traditional music, language, dress and customs. The natural resources of the Greater Annamites are vital to all of these people.

=== Eastern Highlands ===
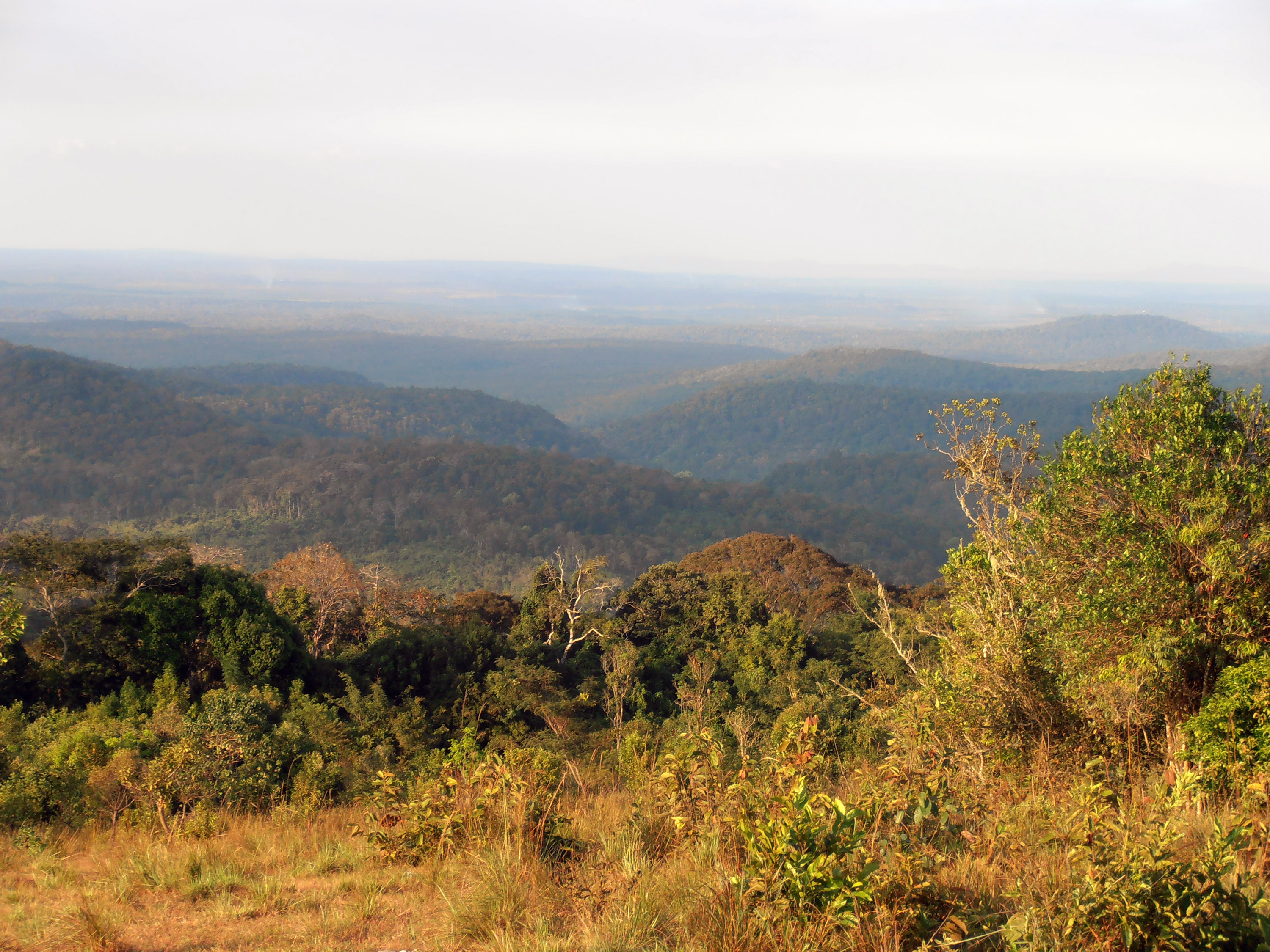
Mountain panorama view in Mondulkiri Province, north-eastern Cambodia, November 2012

Tall grasses and deciduous forests cover the ground east of the Mekong River in Mondulkiri, where the transitional plains merge with the eastern highlands at altitudes from 200 to 1,000 m (660 to 3,280 ft). The landscape has suffered from rubber farming, logging and particularly mining, although sizable areas of pristine jungle survive, which are home to rare and endemic wildlife.

=== Coast ===
Cambodia's coastal area covers 17,237 km^{2} (6,655 sq mi), distributed among four provinces: Sihanoukville province, Kampot province, Koh Kong province, and Kep province. The total length of the Cambodian coastal area has been disputed. The most widely accepted length is 440 km (273 mi), a 1997 survey by the DANIDA organization announced a length at 435 km (270 mi), and in 1973 the Oil Authority found the coast to be 450 km (280 mi) long. The Food and Agriculture Organization claims a length of 557 km (346 mi) in one of its studies.

The southern mountain ranges drain to the south and west towards the shallow sea. Sediments on the continental shelf are the basis for extensive mangroves marshes, in particular in the Koh Kong province and the Ream National Park.

=== Islands ===
Cambodia’s islands fall under administration of the 4 coastal provinces. "There are 60 islands in Cambodia's coastal waters. They include 23 in Koh Kong province, 2 in Kampot province, 22 in Sihanoukville and 13 in Kep city.[sic]" Most islands are, apart from the two small groups of the outer islands, in relative proximity to the coast. The islands and the coastal region of Koh Kong Province are mainly composed of upper Jurassic and lower Cretaceous sandstone massives. The north-westernmost islands near and around the Kaoh Pao river delta (Prek Kaoh Pao) area are to a great extent sediments of estuaries and rivers, very flat and engulfed in contiguous mangrove marshes.

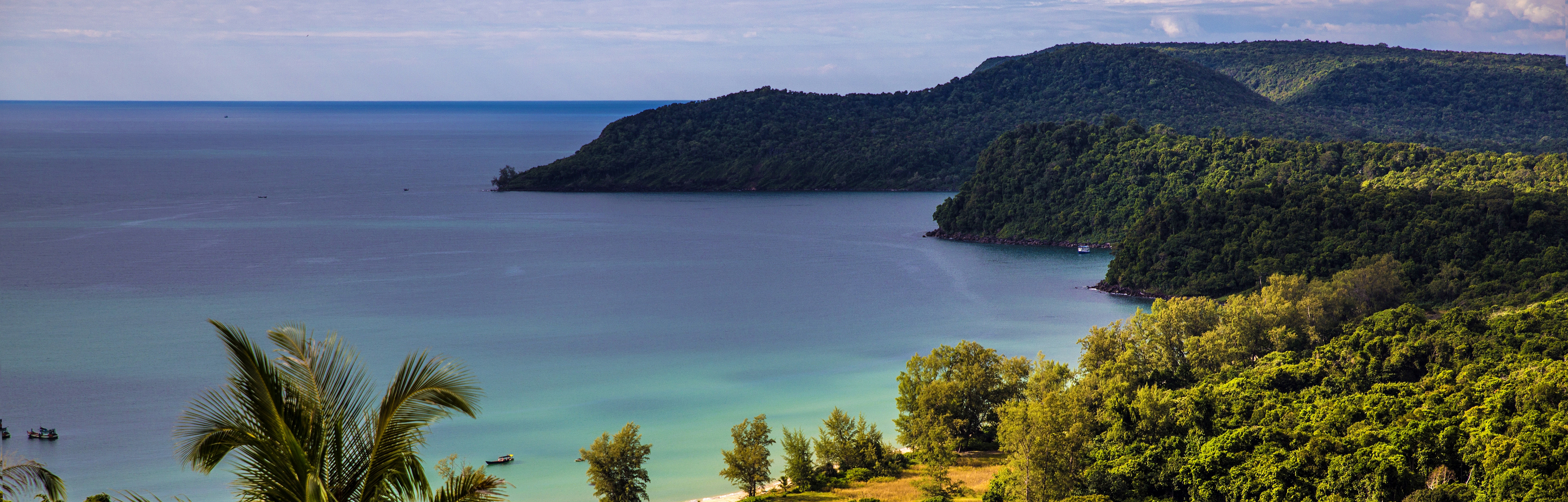
panorama of Koh Rong Sanloem's west coast, shot from the light-house in the south, Cambodia 2014

== Climate ==
A map of Cambodia's Köppen climate classification zones

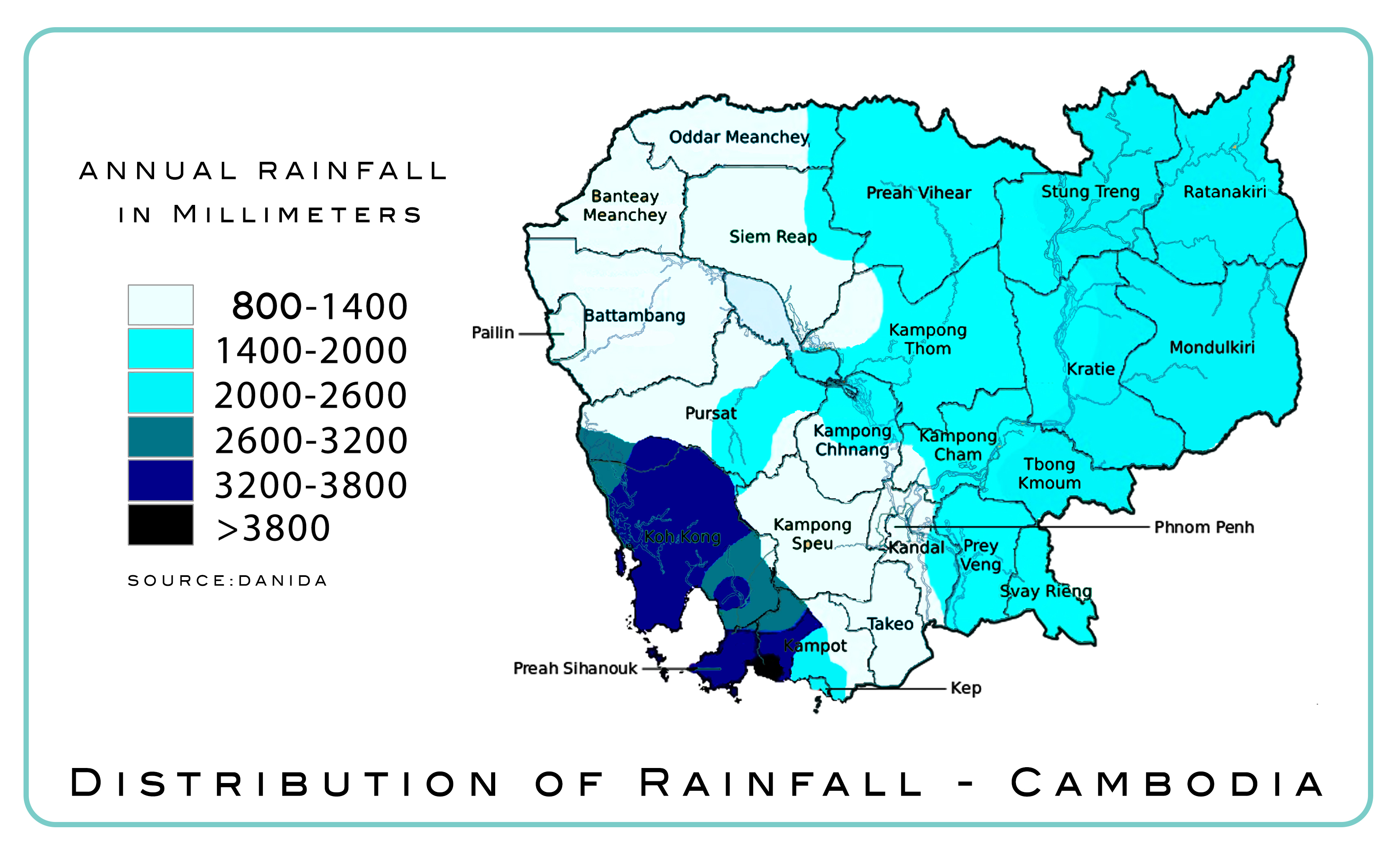
A map of rainfall regimes in Cambodia, source: DANIDA

Worldwide zones of Tropical savanna climate (Aw).

Worldwide zones of tropical monsoon climate (Am).

Cambodia's climate, like that of much of the rest of mainland Southeast Asia is dominated by monsoons, which are known as tropical wet and dry because of the distinctly marked seasonal differences. The monsoonal air-flows are caused by annual alternating high pressure and low pressure over the Central Asian landmass. In summer, moisture-laden air—the southwest monsoon—is drawn landward from the Indian Ocean.

The flow is reversed during the winter, and the northeast monsoon sends back dry air. The southwest monsoon brings the rainy season from mid-May to mid-September or to early October, and the northeast monsoon flow of drier and cooler air lasts from early November to March. Temperatures are fairly uniform throughout the Tonlé Sap Basin area, with only small variations from the average annual mean of around 25 °C (77.0 °F).

The maximum mean is about 30 °C (86 °F) ; the minimum mean, about 24 °C (75 °F). Maximum temperatures of higher than 32 °C (90 °F), however, are common and, just before the start of the rainy season, they may rise to more than 38 °C (100 °F). Minimum night temperatures sporadically fall below 20 °C (68 °F). in January, the coldest month. May is the warmest month - although strongly influenced by the beginning of the wet season, as the area constitutes the easternmost fringe of the south-west monsoon. Tropical cyclones only rarely cause damage in Cambodia.

The total annual rainfall average is between 1,000 and 1,500 mm (39.4 and 59.1 in), and the heaviest amounts fall in the southeast. Rainfall from April to September in the Tonlé Sap Basin-Mekong Lowlands area averages 1,300 to 1,500 mm (51.2 to 59.1 in) annually, but the amount varies considerably from year to year. Rainfall around the basin increases with elevation. It is heaviest in the mountains along the coast in the southwest, which receive from 2,500 mm (98.4 in) to more than 5,000 mm (196.9 in) of precipitation annually as the southwest monsoon reaches the coast.

This area of greatest rainfall drains mostly to the sea; only a small quantity goes into the rivers flowing into the basin. Relative humidity is high throughout the entire year; usually exceeding 90%. During the dry season daytime humidity rates average around 50 percent or slightly lower, climbing to about 90% during the rainy season.

Climate data for Sihanoukville, Cambodia
Month	Jan	Feb	Mar	Apr	May	Jun	Jul	Aug	Sep	Oct	Nov	Dec	Year
Mean daily maximum °C (°F)	29 (84)	29 (84)	29 (84)	30 (86)	31 (88)	30 (86)	29 (84)	29 (84)	29 (84)	29 (84)	30 (86)	29 (84)	29 (85)
Mean daily minimum °C (°F)	25 (77)	26 (79)	27 (81)	28 (82)	28 (82)	28 (82)	27 (81)	27 (81)	27 (81)	27 (81)	26 (79)	25 (77)	27 (80)
Average precipitation mm (inches)	44 (1.7)	30.6 (1.20)	63.1 (2.48)	129.5 (5.10)	190 (7.5)	301.1 (11.85)	305 (12.0)	378.9 (14.92)	351.1 (13.82)	226.9 (8.93)	120.8 (4.76)	55.5 (2.19)	2,196.5 (86.45)
Source: world weather online

Climate data for Phnom Penh, Cambodia
Month	Jan	Feb	Mar	Apr	May	Jun	Jul	Aug	Sep	Oct	Nov	Dec	Year
Mean daily maximum °C (°F)	32 (90)	35 (95)	36 (97)	35 (95)	35 (95)	33 (91)	32 (90)	33 (91)	32 (90)	31 (88)	31 (88)	31 (88)	33 (92)
Mean daily minimum °C (°F)	22 (72)	23 (73)	25 (77)	26 (79)	26 (79)	25 (77)	25 (77)	25 (77)	25 (77)	24 (75)	24 (75)	22 (72)	24 (76)
Average precipitation mm (inches)	12.8 (0.50)	12.2 (0.48)	36.6 (1.44)	106.2 (4.18)	113.4 (4.46)	116.8 (4.60)	92.0 (3.62)	123.9 (4.88)	179.4 (7.06)	177.0 (6.97)	71.4 (2.81)	34.1 (1.34)	1,075.8 (42.34)
Source: world weather online

Climate data for Senmonorom, Cambodia
Month	Jan	Feb	Mar	Apr	May	Jun	Jul	Aug	Sep	Oct	Nov	Dec	Year
Mean daily maximum °C (°F)	27 (81)	31 (88)	33 (91)	34 (93)	33 (91)	30 (86)	29 (84)	29 (84)	29 (84)	29 (84)	28 (82)	27 (81)	30 (86)
Mean daily minimum °C (°F)	17 (63)	18 (64)	19 (66)	21 (70)	22 (72)	21 (70)	21 (70)	21 (70)	21 (70)	20 (68)	19 (66)	18 (64)	20 (68)
Average precipitation mm (inches)	8 (0.3)	5.7 (0.22)	16.6 (0.65)	65.2 (2.57)	154.1 (6.07)	183.5 (7.22)	217.7 (8.57)	225.9 (8.89)	231.4 (9.11)	151.9 (5.98)	98.4 (3.87)	15.3 (0.60)	1,373.7 (54.05)
Source: world weather online

== Hydrology ==
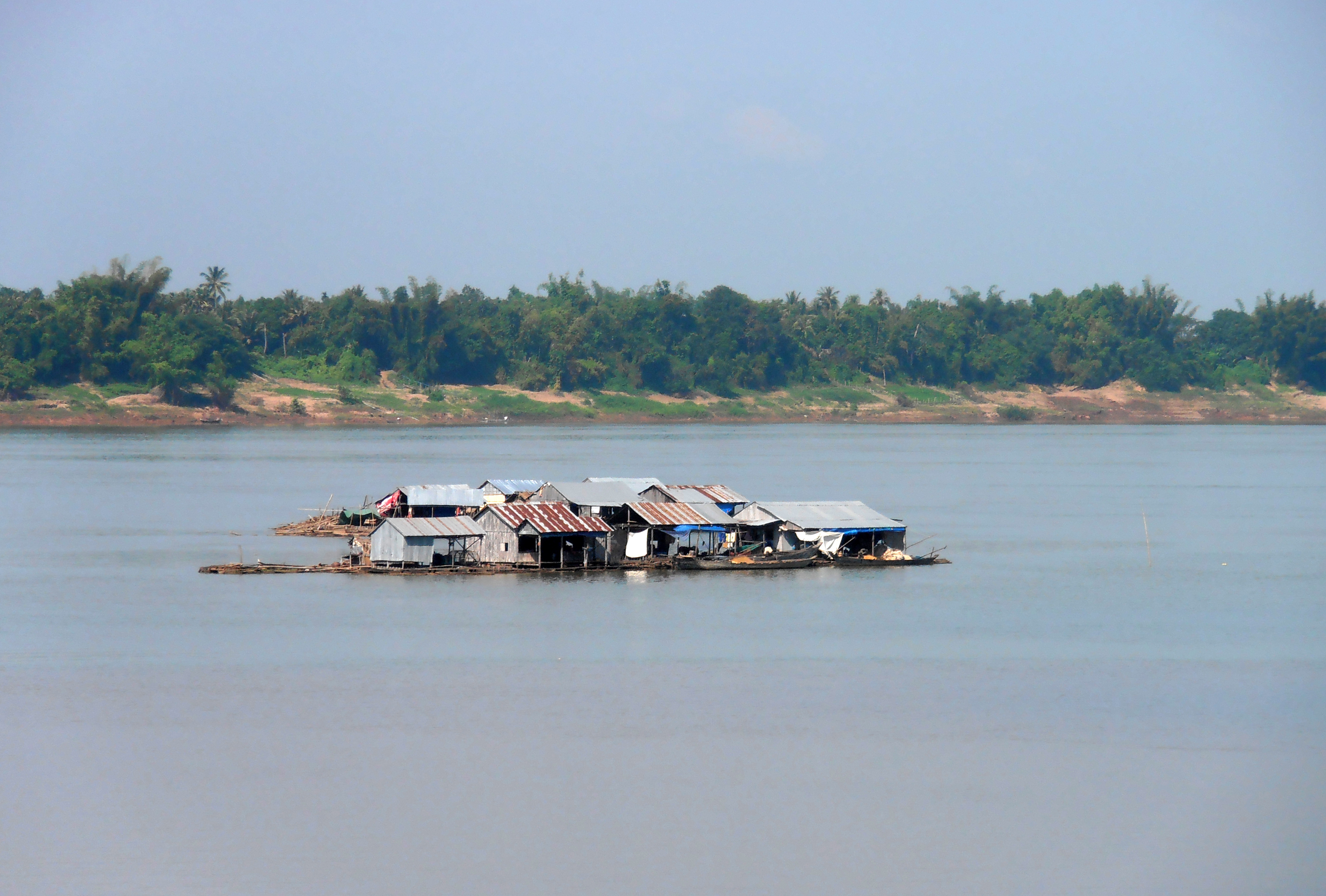
Floating homes on the Mekong

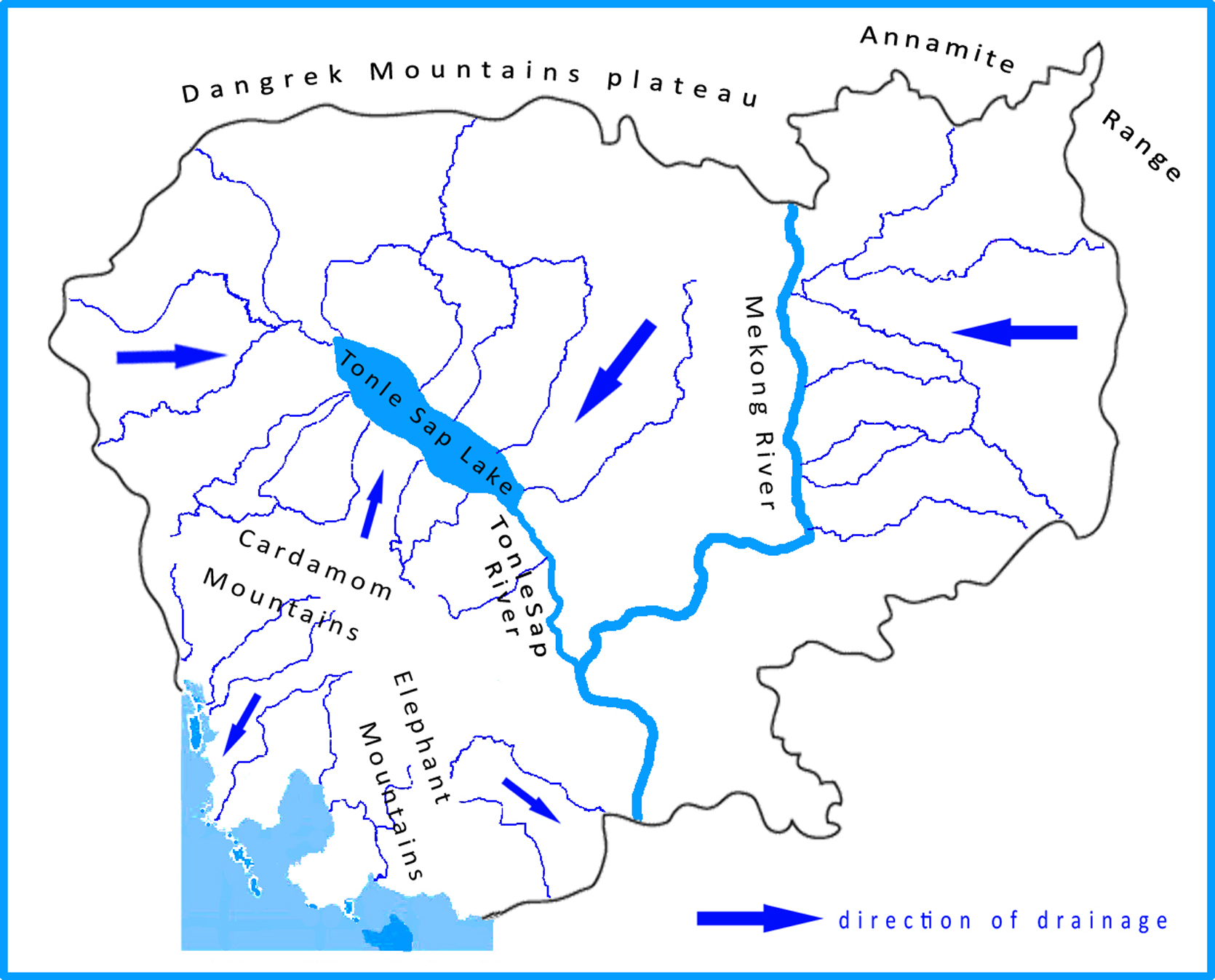
An overview of drainage divides

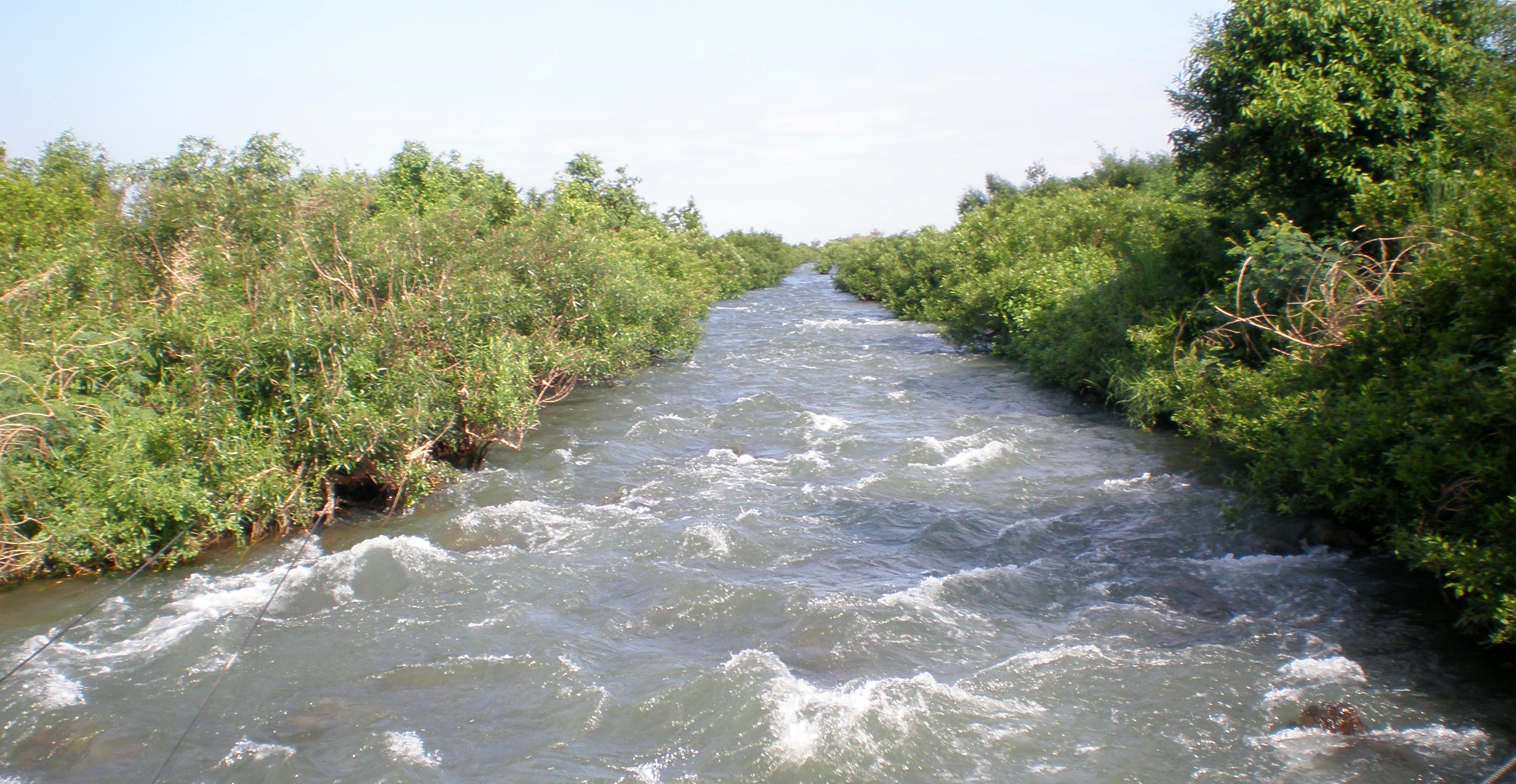
Mekong tributary, Stung Treng Province

The Mekong River and its tributaries comprise one of the largest river systems in the world. The central Tonle Sap, the Great Lake has several input rivers, the most important being the Tonle Sap River, which contributes 62% of the total water supply during the rainy season. Direct rainfall on the lake and the other rivers in the sub-basin contribute the remaining 38%. Major rivers are the Sen river, Sreng River, Stung Pouthisat River, Sisophon River, Mongkol Borei River, and Sangkae River.

Smaller rivers in the southeast, the Cardamom Mountains and Elephant Range form separate drainage divides. To the east the rivers flow into the Tonle Sap, as in the south-west rivers flow into the Gulf of Thailand. Toward the southern slopes of the Elephant Mountains, small rivers flow south-eastward on the eastern side of the divide.

The Mekong River flows southward from the Cambodia-Laos border to a point south of Kratié (town), where it turns west for about 50 km (31 mi) and then turns southwest towards Phnom Penh. Extensive rapids run north of Kratie city. From Kampong Cham Province the gradient slopes very gently, and inundation of areas along the river occurs at flood stage. From June through November—through breaks in the natural levees that have built up along its course. At Phnom Penh four major water courses meet at a point called the Chattomukh (Four Faces). The Mekong River flows in from the northeast and the Tonle Sap river emanates from the Tonle Sap—flows in from the northwest. They divide into two parallel channels, the Mekong River proper and the Bassac River, and flow independently through the delta areas of Cambodia and Vietnam to the South China Sea.

The flow of water into the Tonle Sap is seasonal. In spring, the flow of the Mekong River, fed by monsoon rains, increases to a point where its outlets through the delta can't handle the enormous volume of water. At this point, the water pushes northward up the Tonle Sap river and empties into the Tonle Sap lake, thereby increasing the size of the lake from about 2,590 km^{2} (1,000 sq mi) to about 24,605 km^{2} (9,500 sq mi) at the height of the flooding. After the Mekong's waters crest — when its downstream channels can handle the volume of water — the flow reverses, and water flows out of the engorged lake.

As the level of the Tonle Sap retreats, it deposits a new layer of sediment. The annual flooding, combined with poor drainage immediately around the lake, transforms the surrounding area into marshlands, unusable for agricultural purposes during the dry season. The sediment deposited into the lake during the Mekong's flood stage appears to be greater than the quantity carried away later by the Tonle Sap River. Gradual silting of the lake would seem to be occurring; during low-water level, it is only about 1.5 m (4.9 ft) deep, while at flood stage it is between 10 and 15 m (33 and 49 ft) deep.

== Vegetation & ecoregions ==
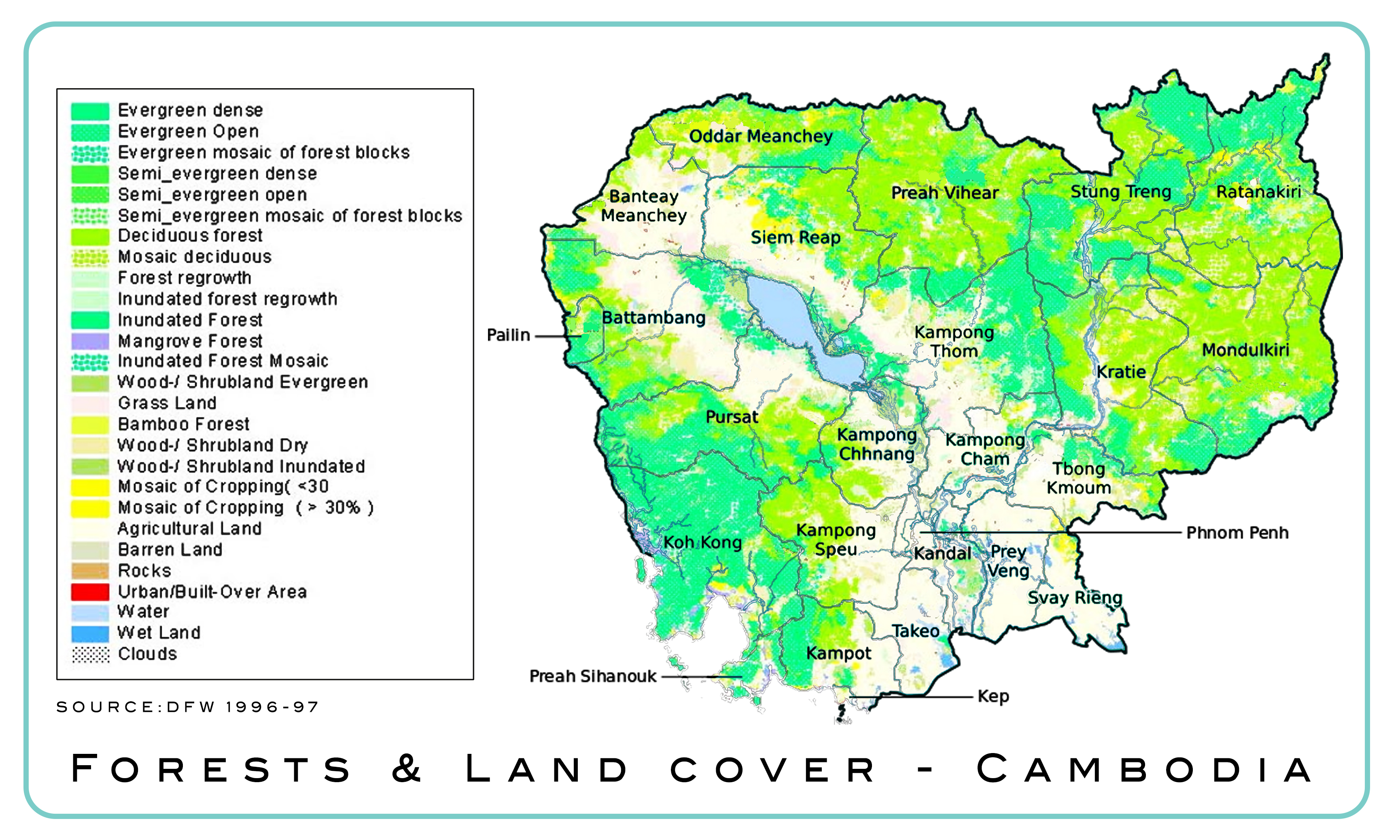
A map of forests, vegetation and land use in Cambodia

Cambodia has one of the highest levels of forest cover in the region as the interdependence of Cambodia’s geography and hydrology makes it rich in natural resources and biological diversity - among the bio-richest countries in Southeast Asia.

In Cambodia forest cover is around 46% of the total land area, equivalent to 8,068,370 hectares (ha) of forest in 2020, down from 11,004,790 hectares (ha) in 1990. In 2020, naturally regenerating forest covered 7,464,400 hectares (ha) and planted forest covered 603,970 hectares (ha). Of the naturally regenerating forest 4% was reported to be primary forest (consisting of native tree species with no clearly visible indications of human activity). For the year 2015, 100% of the forest area was reported to be under public ownership. The Royal Government of Cambodia estimates Cambodia contains approximately 10.36 million hectares of forest cover, representing approximately 57.07% of Cambodia’s land area (2011). On the contrary, international observers and independent sources provide rather different numbers. Consensus permeates, as most sources agree, that deforestation in Cambodia, loss of seasonal wetlands and habitat destruction - among countless minor factors - correlates with the absence of strict administrative control and indifference in law enforcement - not only in Cambodia but the entire region.

Figures and assessments are numerous as are available sources. as seen in numbers below, which provide a wide range for interpretation. About 69,000 ha (170,503 acres) (1%) of forest cover is planted forest. Overall Cambodia’s forests contain an estimated 464 million metric tonnes of carbon stock in living forest biomass. Approximately 40% of Cambodia’s Forests have some level of protection, while one of the Cambodia Millennium Development Goals targets is to achieve a 60% forest cover by 2015.

Cambodia Forest Cover, 2002
Forest Types	Area (ha)	Percentage
Evergreen Forest	3,720,506	20.49
Semi-evergreen forest	1,455,190	8.01
Deciduous forest	4,833,861	26.62
Other forest	1,094,726	6.03
Non-forest	7,056,388	38.85
Source: United Nations

Cambodia Forest Cover, 2002
Forest Types	Area (ha)	Percentage
forests - commercially unattractive	3.200.000	30
forests - commercially attractive	630.000	6
flooded forest - cut and/or converted		30
flooded forest - healthy	450.000	
lost area	550.000	55
Source: CAMBODIA DEVELOPMENT RESOURCE INSTITUTE

According to the Forestry Administration statistics, a total of 380,000 hectares of forest were cleared between 2002 and 2005/2006 - a deforestation rate of 0.5% per year. The main cause of deforestation has been determined to be large-scale agricultural expansions.

=== Southern Annamites Montane Rain Forests ecoregion ===
The Southern Annamites Montane Rain Forests ecoregion of the montane forests of Kontuey Nea, "the dragon's tail" in the remote north-west of Cambodia, where the boundaries of Cambodia, Laos, and Vietnam meet [this is in the northeast, not the northwest?], is remarkably rich in biodiversity. The relatively intact forests occupy a broad topographic range - from lowlands with wet evergreen forests to montane habitats with evergreen hardwood and conifer forests. The complex geological, topographic and climatic ( rainfall and temperature ) facets that characterize the region make forest structure and composition unique and very variable. There is an unusually high number of near-endemic and endemic species among the many species to be found in the area. The entire eco-region has a size of 94,000 km^{2} (36,294 sq mi).

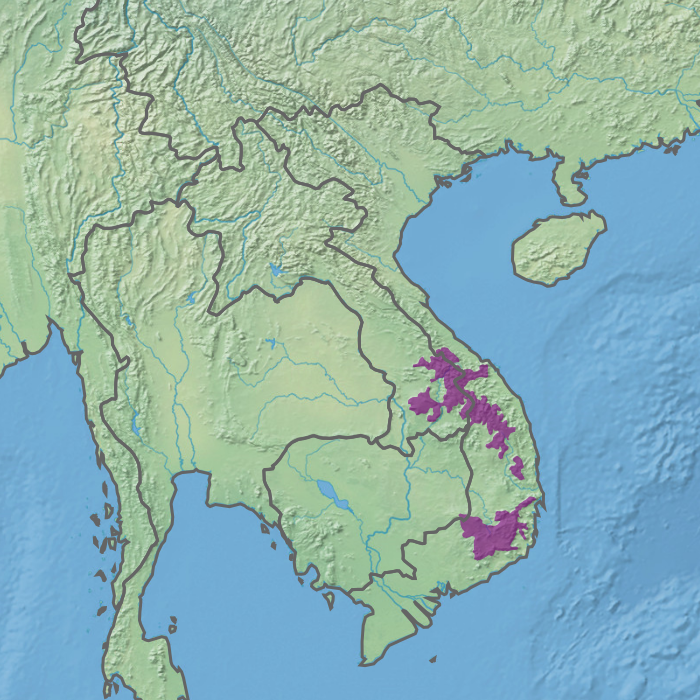
Southern Annamites montane rain forests: ecoregion territory (in purple)

=== The Great Lake ecosystem ===
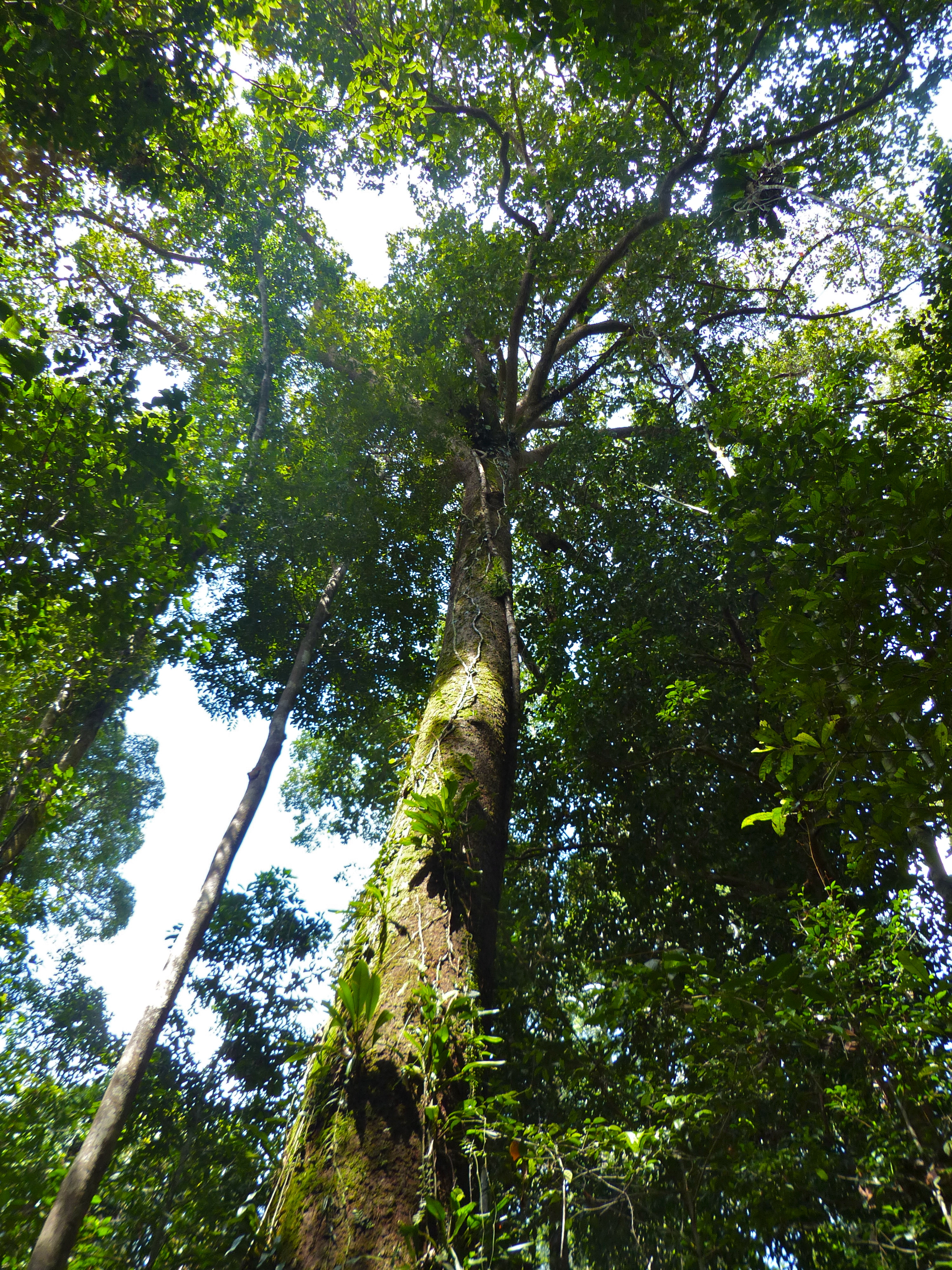
Dipterocarpaceae

The Tonle Sap, also known as the Great Lake in central Cambodia is the largest freshwater lake in Southeast Asia and one of the richest inland fishing grounds in the world. The Lake functions as a natural flood water reservoir for the Mekong system as a whole and therefore is an important source of water for the Mekong Delta during the dry season. The ecosystem has developed as a result of the Mekong’s seasonal flow fluctuations.

A belt of freshwater mangroves known as the "flooded forest" surrounds the lake. The floodplains in turn are surrounded by low hills, covered with evergreen seasonal tropical forest with substantial dipterocarp vegetation or deciduous dry forest. The eco-region consists of a mosaic of habitats for a great number of species. The forest gradually yields to bushes and finally grassland with increasing distance from the lake.

Henri Mouhot: "Travels in the Central Parts of Indo-China" 1864

"During more than five months of the year, the great lake of Cambodia, Touli-Sap, covers an immense space of ground: after that period there is a diminution in depth owing to the great evaporation, but its width remains nearly unaltered. Although its waters increase in volume during the rainy season, these are not swelled by the streams from the mountains on its western boundary, but by the strength of the current from the Mekon which pours into it its overflow.[sic]"

On higher quality soils or at higher elevation, areas of mixed deciduous forest and semi-evergreen forests occur. This variety of vegetation types accounts for the quantity and diversity of species of the Great Lake ecosystem. Interlocking forest, - grassland and marshland patches provide the many facets and refugia for the abundant local wildlife.

The lake’s flooded forest and the surrounding floodplains are of utmost importance for Cambodia's agriculture as the region represents the cultural heart of Cambodia, the center of the national freshwater fishery industry - the nation's primary protein source. Threats to the lake include widespread pollution, stress through growth of the local population which is dependent on the lake for subsistence and livelihood, over-harvesting of fish and other aquatic - often endangered - species, habitat destruction and potential changes in the hydrology, such as the construction and operation of dams, that disrupt the lake's natural flood cycle. However, concerns that the lake is rapidly filling with sediment seem - according to studies - to be unfounded at the present time.

=== Wetlands ===
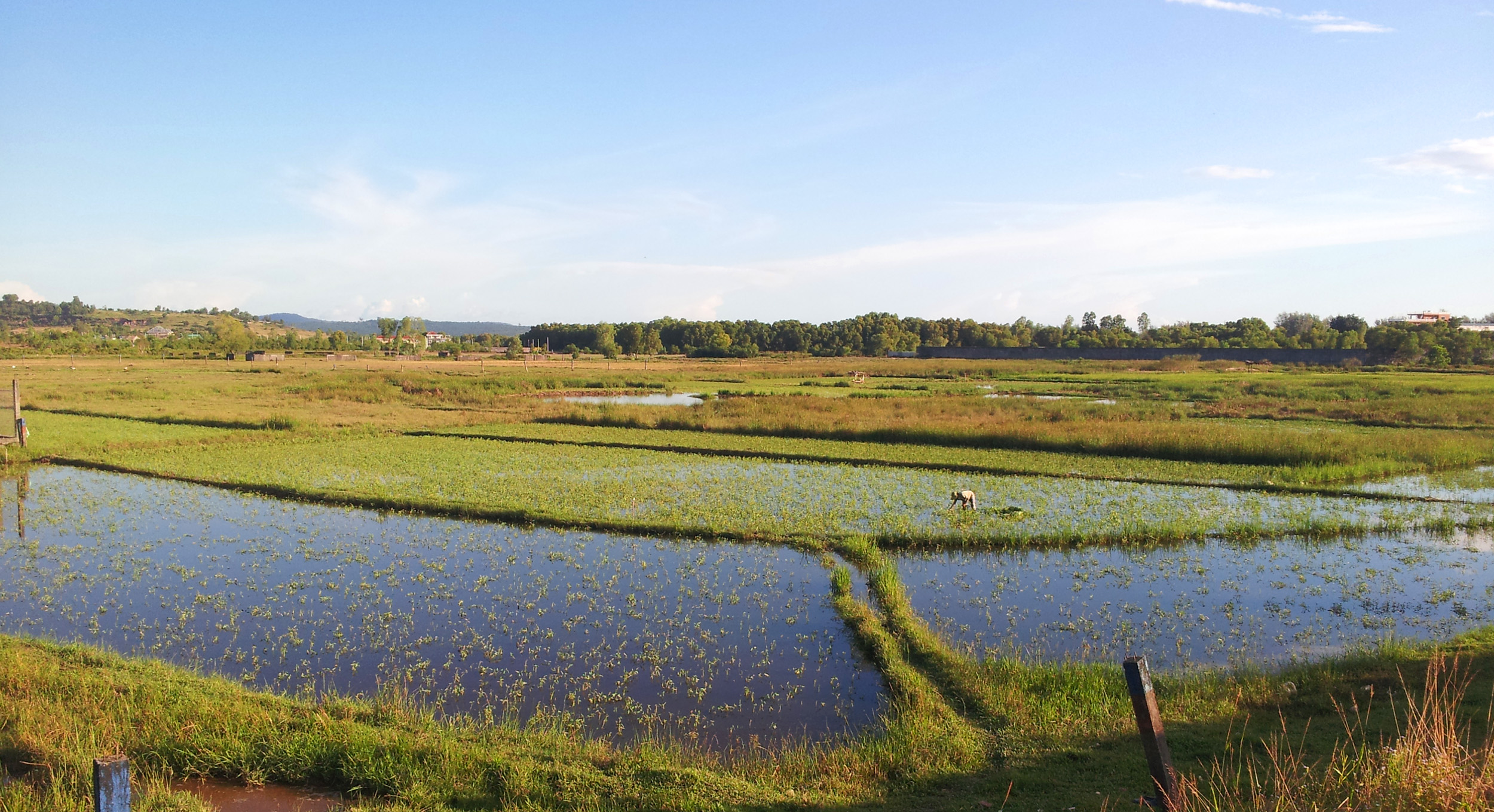
Coastal wetlands near Ream, Sihanoukville Province

Wetlands cover more than 30% of Cambodia. In addition to the Mekong River and the Tonle Sap floodplain there are the Stung Sen River and the coastal Stung Koh Pao - and Stung Kep estuaries of Koh Kong Province and Kep Province. The freshwater wetlands of Cambodia represent one of the most diverse ecosystems worldwide. The area’s extensive wetland habitats are the product of the annual Mekong maximum, the simultaneous wet season and the drainage paths of a number of minor rivers. See also:Geography of Cambodia#Hydrology The numerous and varied wetlands are Cambodia's central and traditional settlement area, the productive environments for rice cultivation, freshwater fisheries, other forms of agriculture and aquaculture and the constantly growing tourism sector. Considering the eco-region's importance, a variety of plans for local wetland management consolidation exist with varying degrees of completion.

=== Coastal habitats ===
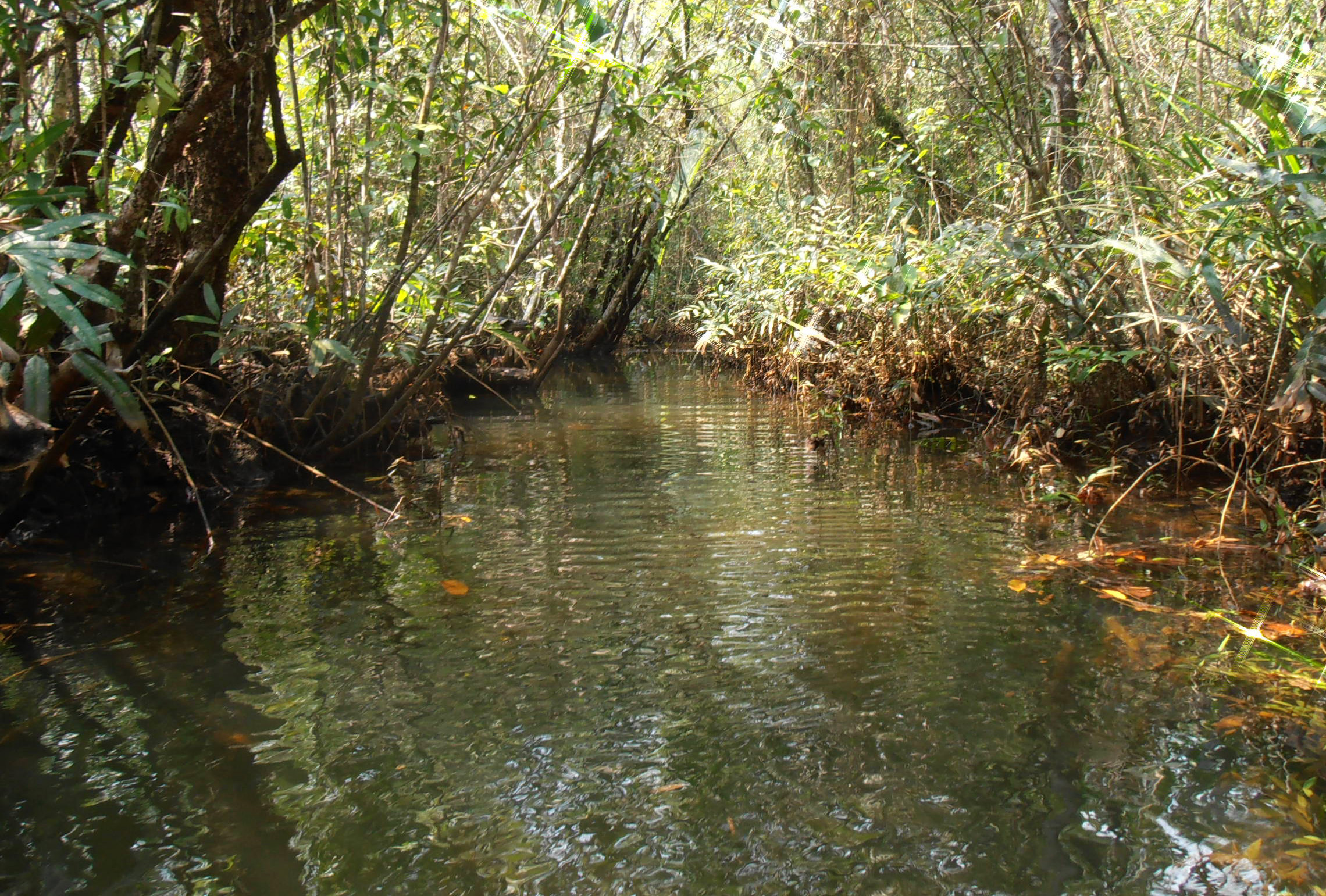
Mangrove forests in Koh Kong Province Cambodia, September 2013

The Cambodian coastline consists of 60,000 ha (150,000 acres) of over 30 species of mangroves - among the most biologically diverse wetlands on earth. The most pristine mangrove forests are found in Koh Kong Province. In addition to mangroves, sea-grass beds extend throughout the coastal areas, especially in Kampot Province, the Sihanoukville Bay Delta and the Kep municipal waters. The meadows are highly productive, but few animals feed directly on the grasses. Those that do tend to be vertebrates such as sea turtles, dabbling ducks and geese.

"With their roots deep in mud, jagged and gnarled mangrove trees are able to grow in the brackish wetlands between land and sea where other plant life cannot survive. The trees offer refuge and nursery grounds for fish, crabs, shrimp, and mollusks. They are nesting - and migratory sites for hundreds of bird species. They also provide homes for monkeys, lizards, sea turtles, and many other animals as well as countless insects."

"Until relatively recently, the mangroves of Koh Kong, Cambodia have remained relatively intact. This is partly because of the region’s location — it is an isolated, inaccessible place — and because decades of war and conflict perversely protected the forests from over-exploitation. Local people, however, tended to use the forest's sustainability, for food, fuel, medicine, building materials, and other basic needs."

== Fauna ==
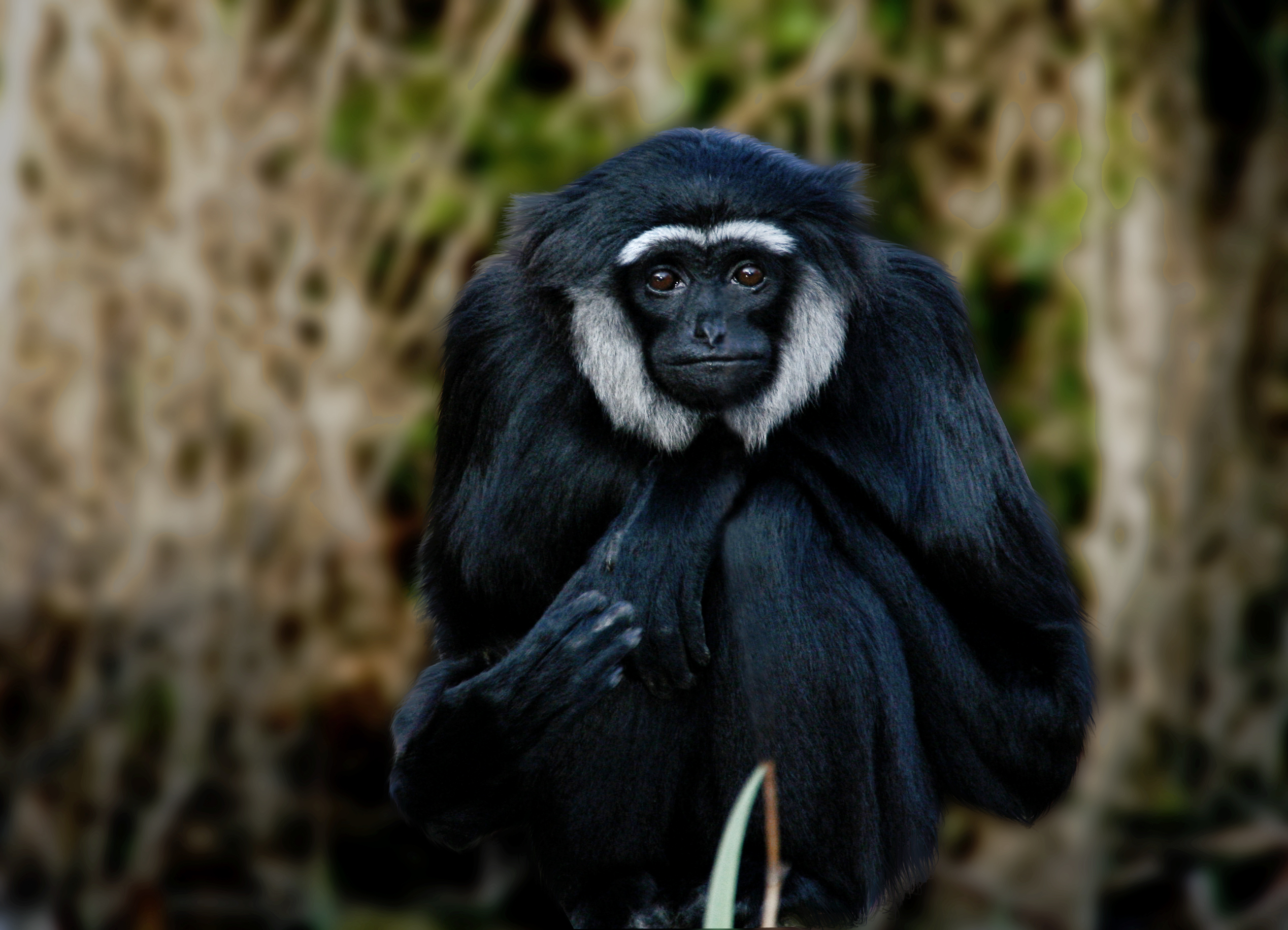
The endangered Agile gibbon

Cambodia is home to a wide array of wildlife. There are 212 mammal species, 536 bird species, 176 reptile species (including 89 subspecies), 850 freshwater fish species (Tonlé Sap Lake area), and 435 marine fish species. Many of the country's species are recognized by the IUCN or World Conservation Union as threatened, endangered, or critically endangered due to deforestation and habitat destruction, poaching, illegal wildlife trade, farming, fishing, and unauthorized forestry concessions. Intensive poaching may have already driven Cambodia's national animal, the Kouprey, to extinction. Wild tigers, Eld's deer, wild water buffaloes and hog deer are at critically low numbers.

== Protected areas ==
"The 1993 Royal Decree on the Protection of Natural Areas recognized 23 protected areas, which at the time covered more than 18% of the country’s total land area."

- Natural parks (sometimes described as ‘national parks’)
- Wildlife reserves
- Protected scenic view areas (sometimes described as ‘protected landscapes’)
- Multi-purpose areas

== Political and human geography ==
Cambodia borders Vietnam over a length of 1,228 km (763 mi), Thailand over a length of 803 km (499 mi) and Laos over a length of 541 km (336 mi), with 2,572 km (1,598 mi) in total and an additional 443 km (275 mi) of coastline. The capital (reach thani) and provinces (khaet) of Cambodia are first-level administrative divisions. Cambodia is divided into 25 provinces including the capital.

Municipalities and districts are the second-level administrative divisions of Cambodia. The provinces are subdivided into 159 districts and 26 municipalities. The districts and municipalities in turn are further divided into communes (khum) and quarters (sangkat).

=== Land use ===
Cambodia, Laos and Vietnam have experienced major changes in land use and land cover over the last two decades. The emergence from cold war rivalries and recent major economic reforms result in a shift from subsistence agrarian modes of production to market-based agricultural production and industrialized economies, which are heavily integrated into regional and global trade systems.

Land Use in Cambodia - Sources: World Bank, FAO UN
	1990	2000	2002	2010
Agricultural land (km^{2}) in Cambodia	44550.0	47700.0		
Agricultural land (% of land area) in Cambodia	25.2	27.0	23.0	
Arable land (hectares) in Cambodia	3695000.0	3700000.0		
Arable land (hectares per person) in Cambodia	0.4	0.3		
Arable land (% of land area) in Cambodia	20.9	21.0		
Permanent cropland (% of land area) in Cambodia	0.6	0.8		
Forest area (km^{2}) in Cambodia	129460.0	115460.0		100940.0
Forest area (% of land area) in Cambodia	73.3	65.4	54.0	57.2

=== Regional divisions ===
Cambodia's boundaries were for the most part based upon those recognized by France and by neighboring countries during the colonial period. The 800 km (500 mi) boundary with Thailand runs along the watershed of the Dangrek Mountains, although only in its northern sector. The 541 km (336 mi) border with Laos and the 1,228 km (763 mi) border with Vietnam result from French administrative decisions and do not follow major natural features. Border disputes have broken out in the past and do persist between Cambodia and Thailand as well as between Cambodia and Vietnam.

Number	Province	Capital	Area (km²)	Population
1	Banteay Meanchey	Serei Saophoan	6,679	678,033
2	Battambang	Battambang	11,702	1,036,523
3	Kampong Cham	Kampong Cham	4,549	1,010,098
4	Kampong Chhnang	Kampong Chhnang	5,521	472,616
5	Kampong Speu	Kampong Speu	7,017	718,008
6	Kampong Thom	Kampong Thom	13,814	908,398
7	Kampot	Kampot	4,873	585,110
8	Kandal	Ta Khmau	3,568	1,265,805
9	Kep	Kep	336	80,208
10	Koh Kong	Koh Kong	11,160	139,722
11	Kratié	Kratié	11,094	318,523
12	Mondulkiri	Senmonorom	14,288	60,811
13	Oddar Meanchey	Samraong	6,158	185,443
14	Pailin	Pailin	803	70,482
15	Phnom Penh	Phnom Penh	758	2,234,566
16	Preah Sihanouk	Sihanoukville	2,536.68	199,902
17	Preah Vihear	Tbeng Meanchey	13,788	170,852
18	Pursat	Pursat	12,692	397,107
19	Prey Veng	Prey Veng	4,883	947,357
20	Ratanakiri	Banlung	10,782	217,453
21	Siem Reap	Siem Reap	10,229	1,000,309
22	Stung Treng	Stung Treng	11,092	111,734
23	Svay Rieng	Svay Rieng	2,966	498,785
24	Takéo	Doun Kaev	3,563	843,931
25	Tboung Khmum	Suong	4,928	754,000

== Area and boundaries ==

Area
- total: 181,035 km^{2} (69,898.0 sq mi)
  - country rank in the world: 88th
- land: 176,515 km^{2} (68,152.8 sq mi)
- water: 4,520 km^{2} (1,745.2 sq mi)
Area comparative
- Australia comparative: slightly less than 4/5 the size of Victoria
- Canada comaparative: slightly more than 2 1/2 times the size of New Brunswick
- United States comparative: approximately the size of Oklahoma
- United Kingdom comparative: approximately 3/4 the size of the United Kingdom
- EU comparative: slightly less than twice the size of Portugal

Maritime claims
- territorial sea: 12 nmi (13.8 mi; 22.2 km)
- contiguous zone: 24 nmi (27.6 mi; 44.4 km)
- exclusive economic zone: 200 nmi (230.2 mi; 370.4 km)
- continental shelf: 200 nmi (230.2 mi; 370.4 km)

Elevation extremes
- lowest point: Gulf of Thailand 0 m (0 ft)
- highest point: Phnum Aoral 1,810 m (5,940 ft)

Border disputes
- Cambodian–Thai border dispute
- Cambodian–Vietnamese land dispute

Lakes
- Tonlé Sap Lake
- Yak Loum Crater Lake — Ratanakiri

== Natural resources ==
- Oil and natural gas - In addition to the four parts of mining project, the oilfield, Block A was discovered in 2005 and located 200 km (120 mi) offshore in the gulf of Thailand Chevron would operate and hold a 30% interest Block A which cover 4,079 km^{2} (1,575 sq mi). It is expected to get 30-year-production permit in the second quarter of 2011.

In late 1969, the Cambodian government granted a permit to a French company to explore for petroleum in the Gulf of Thailand. By 1972 none had been located, and exploration ceased when the Khmer Republic (see Appendix B) fell in 1975. Subsequent oil and gas discoveries in the Gulf of Thailand and in the South China Sea, however, could spark renewed interest in Cambodia's offshore area, especially because the country is on the same continental shelf as its Southeast Asian oil-producing neighbors.

- Timber
  - Dipterocarpus alatus (chheuteal tan) sawnwood, veneer, plywood
  - Anisoptera glabra (mersawa, phdiek) sawnwood, veneer, plywood
  - Hopea odorata (koki) Sawmilling, construction (bridges, boats)
  - Shorea vulgaris (choë(r) chông) sawmilling, construction (housing)
  - Heritiera javanica (synonym Tarrietia javanica) sawnwood (decorative, furniture)
- Gemstones - Gemstone areas are located in Samlot district of Battambang, Paillin, Ratanakkiri, and Takéo Province
- Iron ore - Hermatite (Fe_{2}O_{3}); Magnetite (Fe_{3}O_{4}); Limonite (2Fe_{2}O_{3}, 3H_{2}O) - was found in two areas, one located in Phnom Deck and the others located in Koh Keo of Preah Vihear Province, and Thalaborivath of Stung Treng Province. According to General Department of Mineral, the total iron reserves in Phnom Deck area are estimated at 5 to 6 Million tons and other deposits may add 2 to 3 Million tons.
- Gold - Gold deposit was found in four provinces: Kampong Cham (The Rumchek in Memot area), Kampong Thom (Phnom Chi area), Preah Vihear (Phnom Deck in Roveing district), Ratanakiri (Oyadav district) and Mondulkiri
- Bauxite – was found in Battambang Province and Chhlong district in Mondulkiri Province.
- Antimony (Sb) – found in Sre Peang area, Pursat Province
- Chromium (Cr) – found in Sre Peang area, Pursat Province
- manganese
- phosphates
- Hydro-power - Hydroelectric dams: Lower Se San 2 Dam, Stung Treng Dam
- Arable land
- Marine resources

Total renewable water resources:

- 476.1 km^{3} (114.22 cu mi) (2011)

Freshwater withdrawal (domestic/industrial/agricultural):

- Total: 2.18 km^{3} or 0.523 cu mi/yr (4%/2%/94%)
- Per capita: 159.8 km^{3} or 38.3 cu mi/yr (2006)

== Environmental issues ==
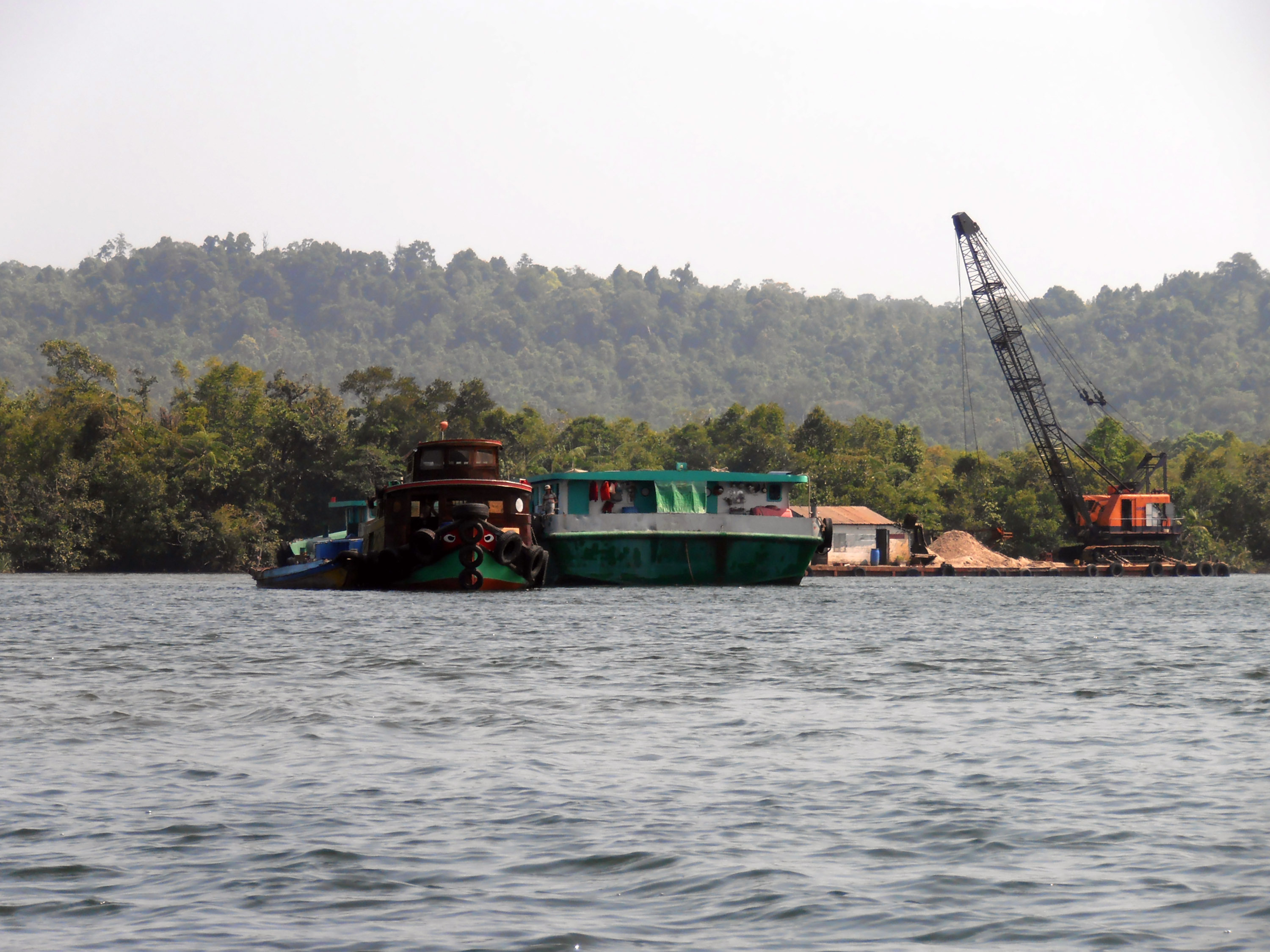
Unauthorized sand mining at the Tatai River in the Koh Kong Conservation Corridor, Cambodia 2012

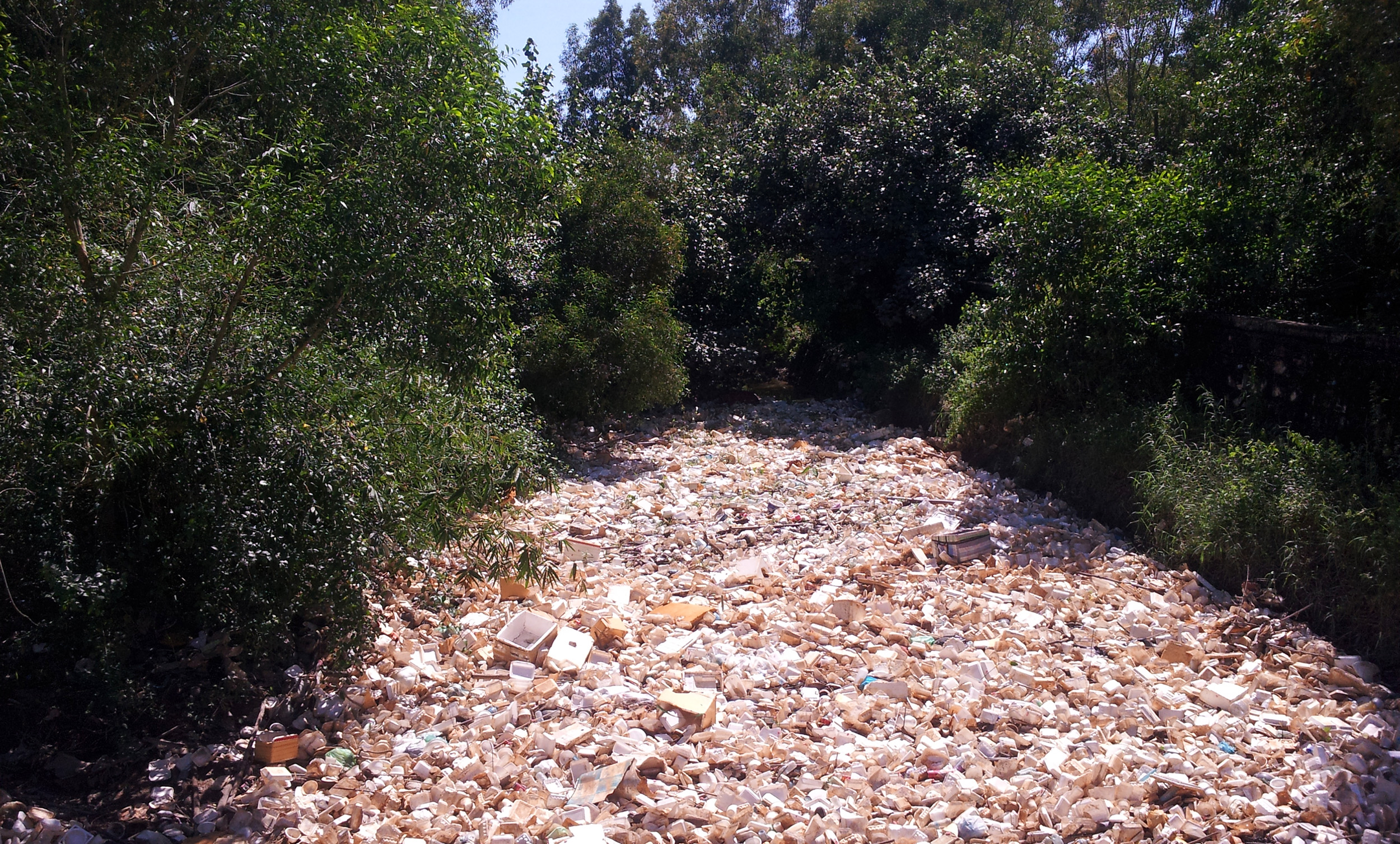
A polluted estuary near Ream commune in Sihanoukville province, Cambodia 2014

=== Natural hazards ===
- Monsoonal rains (June to November)
- Mekong flooding
- Occasional droughts

=== Human impact ===
"Environmental and natural resources in Cambodia are threatened by short-sighted over-exploitation on an increasing and threatening scale. This reduces the Country’s overall natural capital, yet whilst great benefits flow to the few; equally great burdens fall on the many."

Issues

- Illegal logging activities throughout the country
- rubber tree mono-cultures and strip mining for gold in the eastern highlands
- gem mining in the western region along the border with Thailand
- destruction of mangrove swamps threatens natural fisheries, illegal fishing and over-fishing
- large scale sand mining in river beds and estuaries of Koh Kong's mangrove marshes affects tidal balance

A nascent environmental movement has been noticed by NGO's - and it is gaining strength, as the example of local resistance against the building of a Chinese hydro-electric dam in the Areng Valley shows.

Cambodia has a bad but improving performance in the global Environmental Performance Index (EPI) with an overall ranking of 146 out of 180 countries in 2016. This is among the worst in the Southeast Asian region, only ahead of Laos and Myanmar. The EPI was established in 2001 by the World Economic Forum as a global gauge to measure how well individual countries perform in implementing the United Nations' Sustainable Development Goals.

The environmental areas where Cambodia performs worst on the EPI (i.e. highest ranking) are air quality (148), water resource management (140) and health impacts of environmental issues (137), with the areas of sanitation, environmental impacts of fisheries and forest management following closely. Cambodia has an unusually large expanse of protected areas, both on land and at sea, with the land-based protections covering about 20% of the country. This secures Cambodia a better than average ranking of 61 in relation to biodiversity and habitat, despite the fact deforestation, illegal logging, construction and poaching are heavily deteriorating these protections and habitats in reality, partly fueled by the government's placement of economic land concessions and plantations within protected areas.

In November 2017, the U.S. cut funds to help clear unexploded ordnance including land mines and chemical weapons in Cambodia which it had dropped during the Vietnam War.

Consequences

- Flooding
- Deforestation
- Soil erosion in rural areas
- Declining fish stocks
- Decreasing access to clean water
- Habitat loss and declining biodiversity

=== International agreements and conventions ===
Cambodia is party to the following treaties:

- Convention on Biological Diversity
- Convention on Climate Change
- MARPOL 73/78
- Tropical Timber 94
- Ramsar Convention on Wetlands

Signed, but not ratified:

- Law of the Sea

== See also ==
- List of rivers of Cambodia
- List of islands of Cambodia
- List of Cambodian inland islands
