= Uralsky =

Uralsky (masculine), Uralskaya (feminine), or Uralskoye (neuter) may refer to:

- Ural Federal District (Uralsky federalny okrug), a federal district of Russia
- Uralsky (inhabited locality) (Uralskaya, Uralskoye), name of several inhabited localities in Russia
- Uralskaya metro station, a station of the Yekaterinburg Metro, Yekaterinburg, Russia

See also

- Ural (disambiguation)
