= Oral =

The word oral may refer to:

== Relating to the mouth ==
- Relating to the mouth, the first portion of the alimentary canal that primarily receives food and liquid
  - Oral administration of medicines
  - Oral examination (also known as an oral exam or oral test), a practice in many schools and disciplines in which an examiner poses questions to the student in spoken form
  - Oral hygiene, practices involved in cleaning the mouth and preventing disease
  - Oral medication
  - Oral rehydration therapy, a simple treatment for dehydration associated with diarrhea
  - Oral sex, sexual activity involving the stimulation of genitalia by use of the mouth, tongue, teeth or throat.
  - Oral stage, a human development phase in Freudian developmental psychology
  - Oral tradition, cultural material and tradition transmitted orally from one generation to another
  - Oralism, the education of deaf students through oral language by using lip reading, and mimicking of mouth shapes and breathing patterns
  - Speech communication, also known as oral communication or verbal communication, as opposed to writing

== Places ==
- Oral, Kazakhstan, a city
- Oral, South Dakota, United States
- Royaume d'Oral, 18th-century French name for the Principality of Bethio on the Senegal River in West Africa
- Oral Roberts University, named after the televangelist

== People ==
- Oral (name), list of people with the name

== Music ==
- "Oral" (song), 2023 song by Björk and Rosalía

== Initiative ==
- Operation Recover All Loot (ORAL), anti-corruption initiative by the Second presidency of John Mahama.

== See also ==
- Aural
- Ora (disambiguation)
- Orel (disambiguation)
- Ural (disambiguation)
