= Operation Recover All Loot =

2025 ORAL investigation

- Location: Accra, Ghana
- Also known as: ORAL
- Participants: Sam Okudzeto (chairperson); Daniel Yaw Domelevo (Member); COP Nathan Kofi Boakye (Member); Martin Kpebu (Member); Raymond Archer (Member)

The Operation Recover All Loot (ORAL) is a National Democratic Congress (Ghana) led initiative focused on investigating and reclaiming misappropriated state funds and assets. The initiative is part of the John Mahama second-term administration's campaign promise to Ghanaian voters.

== Oral Mandate ==
ORAL, as promised by the John Mahama administration, is hinged on three central themes:

- Investigate Cases of Corruption

A dedicated task force will be formed to thoroughly examine alleged corruption incidents that occurred under previous governments, with a particular focus on the period of the New Patriotic Party (NPP) administration.

- Recover Misappropriated State Resources

ORAL is committed to reclaiming misappropriated public funds, properties, and other state assets, ensuring that these resources are redirected toward national development initiatives.

- Prosecute Offenders

The NDC pledges to take firm legal action against individuals and organizations proven to have misused public resources—this includes officials from the outgoing NPP administration and any future offenders.

== ORAL Task Force ==
On December 18, 2024, shortly after the election had been declared for John Mahama, he announced an ORAL taskforce to spearhead cumulative investigation into the ORAL initiative. The goal for the team was to gather all evidence that could potentially lead to the successful prosecution of all corruption and corrupt cases from previous government administration, particularly, the erstwhile regime.

ORAL TASKFORCE
Name	Position
Sam Okudzeto Ablakwa	Chairman
Daniel Yaw Domelevo	Member
COP Nathan Kofi Boakye	Member
Martin Kpebu	Member
Raymond Archer	Member
