= Uralic (disambiguation) =

The word Uralic refers to the Uralic languages and their speakers.

It may also refer to:

- Ural (region), a region of Russia
- Ural Mountains

== See also ==
- Ural (disambiguation)
- Uracil – Chemical compound of RNA
- Urali (disambiguation)
