= Irula =

Irula may refer to:

- Irulas, a scheduled tribe of the Nilgiris in Tamil Nadu, India
- Irula language, their Dravidian language

== See also ==
- Urali (disambiguation)
- Irul (film), 2021 Indian film by Naseef Yusuf Izuddin
