= Oral (name) =

Oral is a unisex given name with different origins. In Turkey, it is a masculine name referring to those who would conquer a city or a fortress. It is also used as a surname.

Notable people with the name include:

== Given name ==
=== Male ===
- Oral Çalışlar (born 1946), Turkish journalist and writer
- Oral Hildebrand (1907–1977), American baseball player
- Oral Jacobs (1911–1995), American politician
- Oral Ogilvie (born 1969), Canadian athlete
- Oral Roberts (1918–2009), American televangelist
- Oral Selkridge (born 1962), Antigua and Barbuda athlete
- Oral Suer, American businessman
- Oral Swigart (1897–1973), American naval office
- Oral P. Tuttle (1889–1957), American lawyer and politician

=== Female ===
- Oral Ataniyazova, Uzbek medical scientist

== Surname ==
- Hüdai Oral (1925–2005), Turkish lawyer and politician
- Mahir Oral (born 1980), German boxer
- Nazmiye Oral (born 1969), Dutch actress and writer
- Orel Oral (born 1979), Turkish swimmer
- Sümer Oral (born 1938), Turkish economist and politician
- Tomáš Oral (born 1977), Czech chess player
- Zeynep Oral (born 1946), Turkish journalist
