= Eural =

Eural may refer to:

- Eural Trans Gas, a Hungarian energy company
- Eural, a Belgian bank, subsidiary of Dexia

== See also ==
- Ural (disambiguation)
