= Urali =

Urali may refer to:

- Urali language, a language of Kerala, India
- Urali Kurumba language or Betta Kurumba language, a Dravidian language of India
- Urali Gounder, an ethnic group of India
- Urali Kanchan, or Urali, a village in Maharashtra, India
- Urali railway station, in Maharashtra, India

== See also ==
- Uralic (disambiguation)
- Irula (disambiguation)
- Uruli, a type of cookware
