= Uralsky (inhabited locality) =

Set index of articles associated with the same name

Uralsky (Russian: Ура́льский; masculine), Uralskaya (Ура́льская; feminine), or Uralskoye (Ура́льское; neuter) is the name of several inhabited localities in Russia.

== Modern localities ==
Urban localities

- Uralsky, Perm Krai, a work settlement in Nytvensky District of Perm Krai
- Uralsky, Sverdlovsk Oblast, a settlement in Sverdlovsk Oblast under the administrative jurisdiction of the closed administrative-territorial formation of the same name

Rural localities

- Uralsky, Republic of Bashkortostan, a village in Almukhametovsky Selsoviet of Abzelilovsky District of the Republic of Bashkortostan
- Uralsky, Orenburg Oblast, a settlement in Uralsky Selsoviet of Pervomaysky District of Orenburg Oblast
- Uralsky, Udmurt Republic, a selo in Uralsky Selsoviet of Sarapulsky District of the Udmurt Republic
- Uralskoye, Leningrad Oblast, a settlement of the crossing in Plodovskoye Settlement Municipal Formation of Priozersky District of Leningrad Oblast
- Uralskoye, Orenburg Oblast, a selo in Uralsky Selsoviet of Kvarkensky District of Orenburg Oblast
- Uralskoye, Perm Krai, a selo under the administrative jurisdiction of the city of krai significance of Chaykovsky, Perm Krai
- Uralskaya, a village in Berezovsky Selsoviet of Kuraginsky District of Krasnoyarsk Krai

== Historical localities ==
- Uralsky, Volgograd Oblast, formerly a rural locality (a settlement) in Kirovsky Selsoviet of Sredneakhtubinsky District of Volgograd Oblast; merged into the city of Volzhsky in April 2012
