= Ural District =

Ural District may refer to:

- Ural Federal District, a major administrative region of Russia 2001–
- Ural Military District, a military district of the USSR and Russia 1918–2001
- Ural District (Kazakhstan), a district of Kazakh ASSR 1928–1930, centred on the city of Oral, Kazakhstan

== See also ==
- Ural Oblast (disambiguation)
- Ural (region)
