= Uralskoye, Perm Krai =

Uralskoye Уральское
- Selo
- Location within Perm Krai Location within Russia
- Coordinates: 56°26′N 54°23′E
- Country: Russia
- Region: Perm Krai
- District: Chaykovsky
- Time zone: UTC+5:00

Uralskoye (Russian: Уральское) is a rural locality (a selo) and the administrative center of Uralskoye Rural Settlement, Chaykovsky, Perm Krai, Russia. The population was 882 as of 2010. There are 7 streets.
