= Ural, Uchalinsky District, Republic of Bashkortostan =

Ural Урал
- Village
- Location within Bashkortostan Location within Russia
- Coordinates: 54°12′N 59°21′E
- Country: Russia
- Region: Bashkortostan
- District: Uchalinsky District
- Time zone: UTC+5:00

Ural (Bashkir and Russian: Урал) is a rural locality (a village) in Imangulovsky Selsoviet, Uchalinsky District, Bashkortostan, Russia. The population was 147 as of 2010. There are 2 streets.

== Geography ==
Ural is located 16 km south of Uchaly (the district's administrative centre) by road. Kudashevo is the nearest rural locality.
