= Ural, Buzdyaksky District, Republic of Bashkortostan =

Ural Урал
- Village
- Location within Bashkortostan Location within Russia
- Coordinates: 54°41′N 54°37′E
- Country: Russia
- Region: Bashkortostan
- District: Buzdyaksky District
- Time zone: UTC+5:00

Ural (Bashkir and Russian: Урал) is a rural locality (a village) in Karansky Selsoviet, Buzdyaksky District, Bashkortostan, Russia. The population was 47 as of 2010. There is 1 street.

== Geography ==
Ural is located 20 km northeast of Buzdyak (the district's administrative centre) by road. Yuraktau is the nearest rural locality.
