= Ural, Kushnarenkovsky District, Republic of Bashkortostan =

Ural Урал
- Village
- Location within Bashkortostan Location within Russia
- Coordinates: 55°04′N 55°10′E
- Country: Russia
- Region: Bashkortostan
- District: Kushnarenkovsky District
- Time zone: UTC+5:00

Ural (Bashkir and Russian: Урал) is a rural locality (a village) in Rasmekeyevsky Selsoviet, Kushnarenkovsky District, Bashkortostan, Russia. The population was 54 as of 2010. There is 1 street.

== Geography ==
Ural is located 16 km southwest of Kushnarenkovo (the district's administrative centre) by road. Baytally is the nearest rural locality.
