= Oral Suer =

Oral Suer was the CEO of the United Way of the National Capital Area (UWNCA) in the Washington, D.C. area from 1974 to 2002. A career United Way executive, Suer helped local community leaders create UWNCA from two predecessor organizations, United Givers Fund and the Health and Welfare Council, when he arrived in 1974. During his tenure, UWNCA raised over $1 billion for local charities.

In 2002, he was charged of defrauding his organization of almost $500,000 through misuse of leave salary, misreporting expenses such as billing private travel to his company, and drawing retirement benefits from the UWNCA retirement fund while he was still working there. In May 2004, he was convicted and sentenced to 27 months in prison.
