= Azad bey Amirov =

Azerbaijani doctor

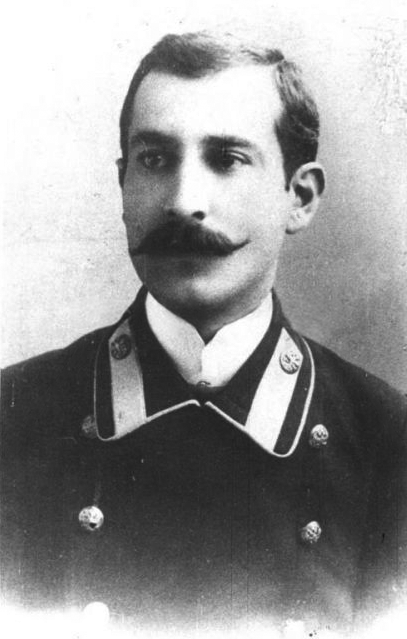
- Born: Azad bey Abbas bey oglu Amirov; 1883; Shusha, Russian Empire
- Died: 1939 (aged 55–56); Baku, Azerbaijan SSR
- Occupations: Doctor and teacher

Azad bey Amirov or Azad bey Abbas bey oglu Amirov (Azerbaijani: Əmirov Azad bəy Abbas oğlu ; b. 1883, Shusha, Russian Empire - d. Baku, Azerbaijan SSR, 1939) was an Azerbaijani doctor and teacher. One of the first physiologists of Azerbaijan.

== Life ==
Azad bey Amirov was born in Shusha in 1883 in a bey family. In 1904, Azad Amirov graduated from the Gori seminary, then the law and medical faculties of the Imperial Novorossiysk University in Odessa. From 1926 he taught at the Azerbaijan State University. He was a childhood friend of the composer Uzeyir Hajibeyov, with whom he studied together at the Gori Seminary. In 1912, Amirov staged the comedy "Not that one, then that one" in Shusha. In his memoirs, Hajibeyov noted the excellent performance of Amirov in the role of Meshadi Ibad. In connection with the tenth anniversary of the production of the opera "Leyli and Majnun" in 1918, Amirov, addressing Hajibeyov in a letter, noted his role in the history of Azerbaijan:

The time will come, and history, only a fair history with its careful hand will write in golden letters this exceptionally unique event in the life of Muslims and yours, dear Uzeyir, beautiful, divine music, presented as a rich treasury, a rare pearl in the joyless life of the long-suffering people.

Azad bey Amırov died in Baku in 1939.
