= Ural Oblast =

Ural Oblast may refer to the following administrative units:

- Ural Oblast (1868–1920) (1868–1920), in the Russian Empire
- Ural Oblast (1917–1919), in the Russian Republic
- Ural Oblast (1923–1934), an oblast of Soviet Russia
- Uralsk Oblast (1962–1992), the name of the West Kazakhstan Region

== See also ==
- Ural District (disambiguation)
- Ural (region)
