= Ural, Yanaulsky District, Republic of Bashkortostan =

Ural Урал
- Village
- Location within Bashkortostan Location within Russia
- Coordinates: 56°12′N 55°25′E
- Country: Russia
- Region: Bashkortostan
- District: Yanaulsky District
- Time zone: UTC+5:00

Ural (Bashkir and Russian: Урал) is a rural locality (a village) in Yamadinsky Selsoviet, Yanaulsky District, Bashkortostan, Russia. The population was 73 as of 2010. There is 1 street.

== Geography ==
Ural is located 45 km southeast of Yanaul (the district's administrative centre) by road. Salikhovo is the nearest rural locality.
