= Uralsk =

Uralsk (Russian: Уральск) is the name of several rural localities in Russia:

- Uralsk, Republic of Bashkortostan, a selo in Uralsky Selsoviet of Uchalinsky District of the Republic of Bashkortostan
- Uralsk, Orenburg Oblast, a selo in Iriklinsky Settlement Council of Gaysky District of Orenburg Oblast

== See also ==
- Ural (inhabited locality)
- Oral, Kazakhstan
