= Ural, Gafuriysky District, Republic of Bashkortostan =

Ural Урал
- Village
- Location within Bashkortostan Location within Russia
- Coordinates: 53°48′N 56°17′E
- Country: Russia
- Region: Bashkortostan
- District: Gafuriysky District
- Time zone: UTC+5:00

Ural (Russian: Урал) is a rural locality (a village) in Yangiskainsky Selsoviet, Gafuriysky District, Bashkortostan, Russia. The population was 38 as of 2010. There is 1 street.

== Geography ==
Ural is located 27 km (17 mi) southwest of Krasnousolsky (the district's administrative centre) by road. Yangiskain is the nearest rural locality.
