= Sam Okudzeto =

Ghanaian politician

Member of Parliament
- In office 1 October 1969 – 13 January 1972

Personal details
- Born: Ghana
- Party: New Patriotic Party
- Education: King's College London
- Occupation: Member of Council of State, Ghana
- Profession: Lawyer

Samuel Awuku Okudzeto (born c. 1935) is a Ghanaian politician and lawyer. In 2011, he was chair of the International Advisory Commission of the Commonwealth Human Rights Initiative and a member of the Commonwealth Lawyers Association. He is a former Member of Parliament in Ghana.

== Early years ==
Sam Okudzeto was his mother's ninth child, in a polygamous family. When he was three his mother separated from his father and they went to Mafi Kumasi in the Volta Region. At the age of ten he went to stay with his father at Adidome, where he attended the Presbyterian School. His father was a UTC shopkeeper, After the 1948 Christiansborg Cross-Roads shooting, soldiers looted most of the European shops, and also his father's shop. The family moved to Atorkor in Anlo, and Okudzeto attended Zion College at Anloga.

== Career ==
After completing his secondary education he taught at the Adidome E.P. Middle School, Mafi Kumasi and then at Somanya Universal Commercial College. Okudzeto moved to Accra, where he worked for almost a year as a clerk with the Electricity Department. He then studied secretarial accountancy at the Leeds College of Commerce in England. From there he went on to King's College London where he studied law, graduating with lower second-class honors on July 9, 1963. Returning to Ghana, at the end of 1963 he became a lawyer with the firm of Law Chambers. When Law Chambers was disbanded in 1971 he set up his own law firm. The firm advises and provides consultancy services in several practice areas including corporate

During the Second Republic he was one of the founders of the National Alliance of Liberals, led by Komla Agbeli Gbedemah, and was elected as a Member of Parliament. He has served as chair of the Public Accounts Committee and president of the Ghana Bar Association. He has also served on The Legal Aid Committee, Prisons Service Council, General Legal Council and Judicial Council. As of June 2007, Okudzeto was aged 72 and was a private legal practitioner in Accra.
