= Uralsky, Republic of Bashkortostan =

Uralsky Уральский
- Village
- Location within Bashkortostan Location within Russia
- Coordinates: 53°01′N 58°57′E
- Country: Russia
- Region: Bashkortostan
- District: Abzelilovsky District
- Time zone: UTC+5:00

Uralsky (Russian: Уральский; Bashkir: Урал, Ural) is a rural locality (a village) in Almukhametovsky Selsoviet, Abzelilovsky District, Bashkortostan, Russia. The population was 77 as of 2010. There are 2 streets.

== Geography ==
Uralsky is located 84 km southeast of Askarovo (the district's administrative centre) by road. Tashkazgan is the nearest rural locality.
