= Ural (ship) =

Ural may refer to the following vessels:

- Russian merchant cruiser Ural (1904), a steamship built in Germany in 1890, sold to Russia in 1904, and sunk by the Japanese in 1905
- Soviet communications ship SSV-33, Soviet command and control ship launched in 1983 and decommissioned in 2001
- Ural (icebreaker), a Russian nuclear-powered icebreaker launched in 2019
