= Ural, Karmaskalinsky District, Republic of Bashkortostan =

Ural Урал
- Village
- Location within Bashkortostan Location within Russia
- Coordinates: 54°23′N 56°14′E
- Country: Russia
- Region: Bashkortostan
- District: Karmaskalinsky District
- Time zone: UTC+5:00

Ural (Russian: Урал) is a rural locality (a village) in Karlamansky Selsoviet, Karmaskalinsky District, Bashkortostan, Russia. The population was 325 as of 2010. There are 4 streets.

== Geography ==
Ural is located 8 km northeast of Karmaskaly, the district's administrative centre, by road. Alexeyevka is the nearest rural locality.
