= Aural District =

Aural ឱរ៉ាល់ Aoral
- District
- Aural District; ស្រុកឱរ៉ាល់
- Location in Cambodia
- Coordinates: 11°41′N 104°7′E
- Country: Cambodia
- Province: Kampong Speu
- Communes: 7
- Villages: 54

Population (2019)
  - Total: 39,544
- Time zone: UTC+07:00 (ICT)
- Geocode: 0504

Aural (Khmer: ឱរ៉ាល់ [ʔaoral]), alternatively spelled Aoral, is a district located in Kampong Speu province in central Cambodia. It includes Phnom Aural, the highest peak in Cambodia.

== Administration ==
Aoral District is subdivided into 5 communes (khum)

Geocode	Khum (Commune)	Phum (Village)
050401	Haong Samnam	
050402	Reasmei Sameaki	
050403	Trapeang Chuor	
050404	Sangkae Satob	
050405	Ta Sal	
