= Ural Amirov =

Russian footballer

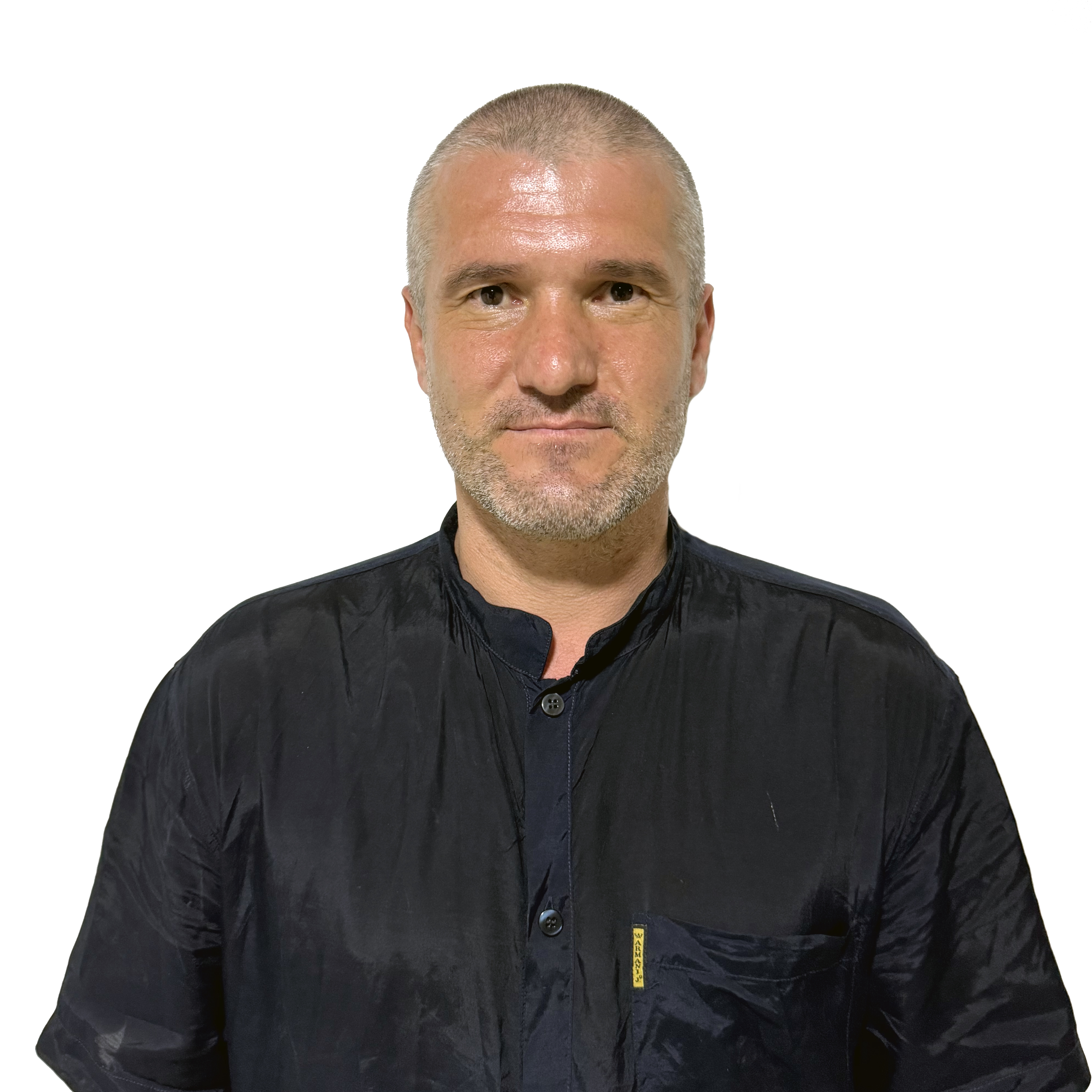

Personal information
- Full name: Ural Rimovich Amirov
- Date of birth: 3 July 1980 (age 46)
- Place of birth: Neftekamsk, Bashkortostan, Russian SFSR
- Height: 1.70 m (5 ft 7 in)
- Position: Forward

Senior career*
Years	Team	Apps	(Gls)
1998	FC Dynamo Izhevsk	16	(1)
1999–2001	FC Gazovik-Gazprom Izhevsk	72	(11)
2001	FC Rubin Kazan	15	(3)
2002	FC Metallurg Krasnoyarsk	20	(2)
2003–2004	FC Fakel Voronezh	69	(9)
2005–2006	FC Volgar-Gazprom Astrakhan	69	(12)
2007	FC Lukhovitsy	20	(6)
2008	FC Chernomorets Novorossiysk	7	(0)
2008	FC Volgar-Gazprom-2 Astrakhan	17	(10)
2009	FC Gornyak Uchaly	17	(1)
2009	FC Bashinformsvyaz-Dynamo Ufa	4	(0)
2010	FC Torpedo Armavir	31	(6)
2011	FC Sakhalin Yuzhno-Sakhalinsk	9	(1)
- * Club domestic league appearances and goals

Ural Rimovich Amirov (Russian: Урал Римович Амиров; born 3 July 1980) is a former Russian professional football player.

== Club career ==
He made his Russian Football National League debut for FC Gazovik-Gazprom Izhevsk on 21 April 1999 in a game against FC Sokol Saratov.
