= Phnom Aural =

Tallest peak in Cambodia

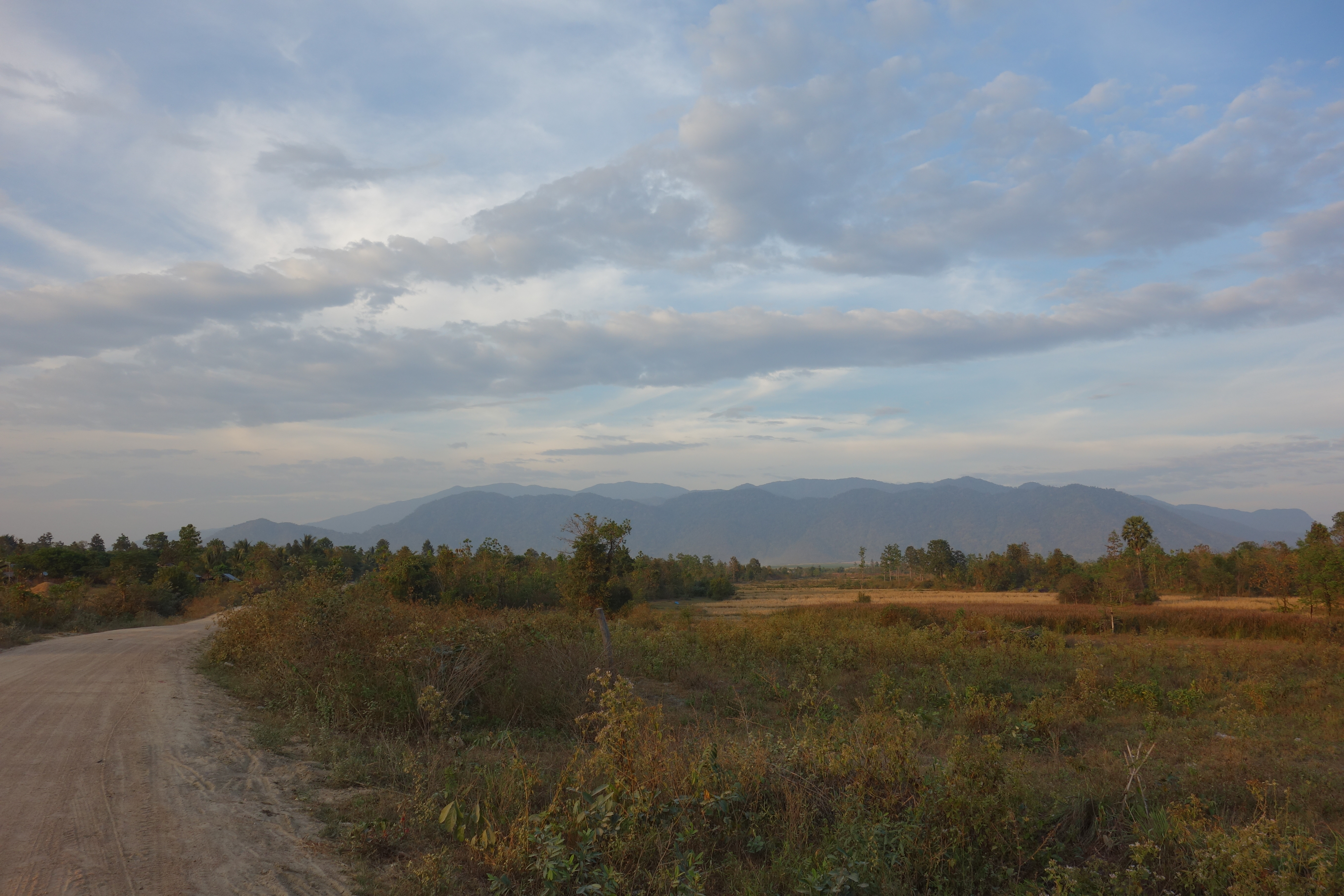

Highest point
- Elevation: 1,813 m (5,948 ft)
- Prominence: 1,744 m (5,722 ft)
- Listing: Country high point Ultra; Ribu
- Coordinates: 12°02′00″N 104°10′00″E

Geography
- Location within Cambodia
- Location: Cambodia
- Parent range: Cardamom Mountains

Phnom Aural (Khmer: ភ្នំឱរ៉ាល់ [pʰnom ʔaoral]), also spelled Phnom Aoral, is the tallest peak in Cambodia. It is 1,813 meters tall (other sources give elevations between 1,771 and 1,667 meters). It is in the eastern part of the Cardamom Mountains.

To protect the biodiversity of the mountains, Phnom Aural Wildlife Sanctuary was established in 1993.

This mountain in located in Aoral District, Kampong Speu Province.

== See also ==
- List of ultras of Southeast Asia
- List of elevation extremes by country
