= Mel-Khaonh language =

Bahnaric language of Cambodia

Mel-Khaonh
- Native to: Cambodia
- Native speakers: 4,000 (2016)
- Language family: Austroasiatic: Bahnaric; Central; South; Mel-Khaonh
- Dialects: Mel; Khaonh

Language codes
- ISO 639-3: hkn
- Glottolog: melk1242

Mel and Khaonh constitute a Bahnaric language of northeastern Cambodia.

Kraol, Thmon, Khaonh, and Mel all have about 70% lexical similarity with Stieng, a Southern Bahnaric language (Barr & Pawley 2013:32).

Mel is spoken in the following villages of Kratié Province, Cambodia (Barr & Pawley 2013).

- Srae Tahaen, Sambok commune, Kratié District
- Ou Krieng, Ou Krieng Commune, Sambour District

Khaonh is spoken in the following villages of Kratié Province, Cambodia (Barr & Pawley 2013).

- Chhok, Thmei commune, Kratié District
- Khnach, Thmei commune, Kratié District
- Kosang, Changkrang commune, Kratié District

== Sources ==
- Barr, Julie and Eric Pawley. 2013. Bahnaric Language Cluster survey of Mondul Kiri and Kratie Provinces, Cambodia. SIL International.
