= Stung Treng province =

Province of Cambodia

Stung Treng Province ខេត្តស្ទឹងត្រែង
- Province

Khmer transcription(s)
  - Khmer: ខេត្តស្ទឹងត្រែង
  - UNGEGN: Khaet Stuĕng Traeng
  - ALA-LC: Khett Sdẏng Traeng
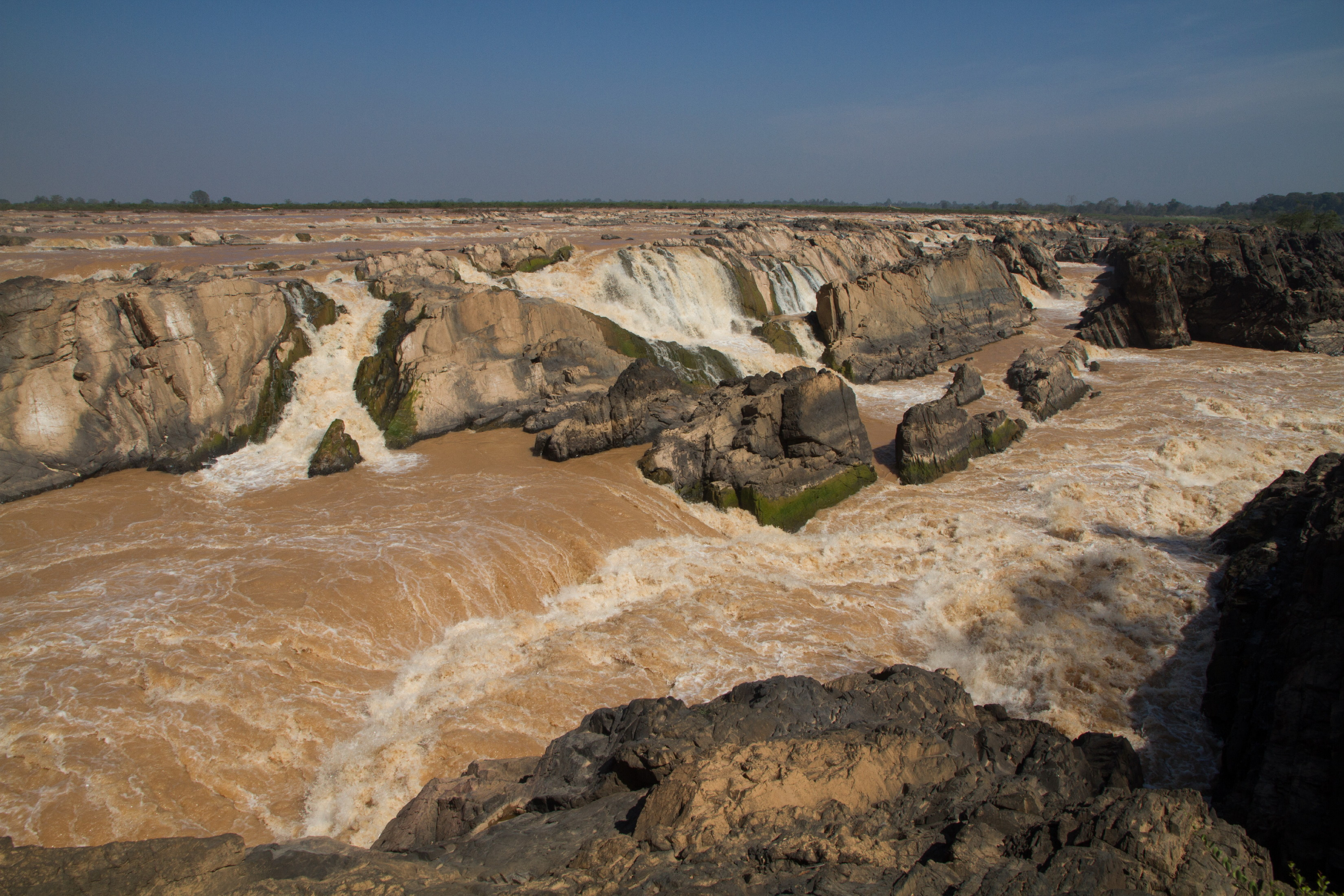
- Sopheakmitt Waterfall

- Seal

- Map of Cambodia highlighting Stung Treng
- Coordinates: 13°31′N 105°57′E
- Country: Cambodia
- Provincial status: 1907
- Capital: Stung Treng
- Subdivisions: 1 municipality; 5 districts

Government
  - Governor: Sor Soputra (CPP)
  - National Assembly: 1 / 125

Area
  - Total: 11,092 km^{2} (4,283 sq mi)
  - Rank: Ranked 8th

Population (2024)
  - Total: ▼176,488
  - Rank: 21st
  - Density: 14/km^{2} (36/sq mi)
  - Rank: 23rd
- Demonym: Stung Trenger(s)

Demographics
  - Language(s): Khmer (official); Lao
- Time zone: UTC+07:00 (ICT)
- Dialing code: +855
- ISO 3166 code: KH-19
- Website: www.stungtreng.gov.kh

Stung Treng Province (Khmer: ខេត្តស្ទឹងត្រែង, Khaet Stuĕng Traeng, [stɨŋ traeŋ]; lit. 'river of reeds') is a province of Cambodia in the northeast. It borders the provinces of Ratanakiri to the east, Mondulkiri and Kratié to the south and Kampong Thom and Preah Vihear to the west. Its northern boundary is Cambodia's international border with Laos. The Mekong River bisects the province. The province is mostly covered by forest, but logging and fishing put high pressure on the forest and fishery reserves.

== Etymology ==
Due to advancement in the Khmer language, it was called "Stung Treng (Khmer: ស្ទឹងត្រែង)" which means a river of reeds.

== History ==
Owing to its border location and the forested mountains in the northeast of the province, it was a hotbed of communist insurgent activity—and a target for U.S. bombs in the 1960s and 70s. The insurgency lasted from the Vietnamese infiltration in the 1950s until the late Khmer Rouge years.

== Geography ==
Stung Treng province, which covers an area of 11,092 square kilometers borders Laos to the north, Ratanakiri to the east, Preah Vihear to the west and Kratié and Kampong Thom to the south.

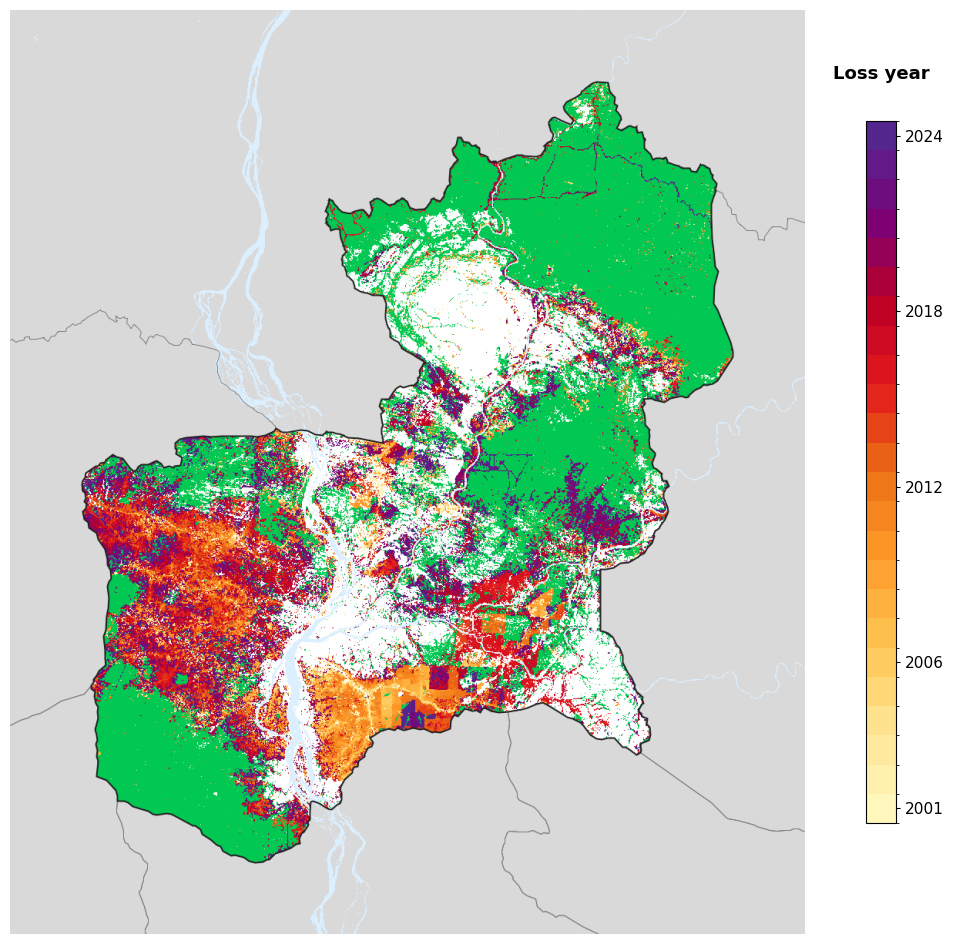
Tree-cover loss year in Stung Treng, 2001-2024, from the Global Forest Change dataset.

Extensive forests, intersecting rivers and streams characterize it. Stung Treng includes also the western chunk of the massive Virachey National Park, accessible from Siem Pang. The province also includes Veun Sai-Siem Pang National Park. The province also features three big rivers—the Sekong River, the Sesan River and the Mekong—with its hundreds of small islands scattered on the river stretch in Stung Treng.

A registered REDD+ project under Japan’s Joint Crediting Mechanism has operated in the Prey Lang Wildlife Sanctuary landscape (including areas linked to Stung Treng), with Conservation International Cambodia described in regional lessons-learned work as a coordinator of the project alongside government and private-sector participants.

Until February 2022, it was one of the few provinces where you could see the rare and endangered Irrawaddy dolphin in the wild near the Laos border, Borei O’Svay Sen Chey District and Anlong Cheuteal in Stung Treng. The population has likely vanished due to illegal fishing in the area.

== Climate ==
Stung Treng has a tropical savanna climate (Köppen Aw). The wet season is oppressive and overcast, the dry season is muggy and partly cloudy, and it is hot year-round. Over the course of the year, the temperature typically varies from 20 °C (68 °F) to 38 °C (100.4 °F) and is rarely below 16 °C (60.8 °F) or above 40 °C (104 °F). Heavy rain falls from May to October, with little rainfall from December to March. The hottest month is April with an average maximum of 35 °C or 95 °F, and the coolest January with an average minimum of 18.9 °C or 66.0 °F.

Climate data for Stung Treng province
Month	Jan	Feb	Mar	Apr	May	Jun	Jul	Aug	Sep	Oct	Nov	Dec	Year
Record high °C (°F)	36.1 (97.0)	37.2 (99.0)	38.3 (100.9)	40.6 (105.1)	38.9 (102.0)	37.2 (99.0)	38.9 (102.0)	38.9 (102.0)	33.9 (93.0)	33.9 (93.0)	34.4 (93.9)	33.9 (93.0)	40.6 (105.1)
Mean daily maximum °C (°F)	31.1 (88.0)	32.8 (91.0)	34.4 (93.9)	35.0 (95.0)	32.8 (91.0)	31.7 (89.1)	30.6 (87.1)	30.6 (87.1)	30.0 (86.0)	30.0 (86.0)	30.0 (86.0)	29.4 (84.9)	31.5 (88.7)
Daily mean °C (°F)	25.0 (77.0)	26.7 (80.1)	28.9 (84.0)	30.0 (86.0)	28.6 (83.5)	27.8 (82.0)	27.0 (80.6)	27.2 (81.0)	26.7 (80.1)	26.4 (79.5)	25.8 (78.4)	24.2 (75.6)	27.0 (80.6)
Mean daily minimum °C (°F)	18.9 (66.0)	20.6 (69.1)	23.3 (73.9)	25.0 (77.0)	24.4 (75.9)	23.9 (75.0)	23.3 (73.9)	23.9 (75.0)	23.3 (73.9)	22.8 (73.0)	21.7 (71.1)	18.9 (66.0)	22.5 (72.5)
Record low °C (°F)	9.4 (48.9)	11.1 (52.0)	17.2 (63.0)	20.0 (68.0)	18.9 (66.0)	19.4 (66.9)	20.0 (68.0)	19.4 (66.9)	18.9 (66.0)	17.2 (63.0)	11.7 (53.1)	10.0 (50.0)	9.4 (48.9)
Average rainfall mm (inches)	2.5 (0.10)	12.7 (0.50)	27.9 (1.10)	83.8 (3.30)	203.2 (8.00)	276.9 (10.90)	337.8 (13.30)	309.9 (12.20)	325.1 (12.80)	188.0 (7.40)	61.0 (2.40)	12.7 (0.50)	1,841 (72.48)
Source: Sistema de Clasificación Bioclimática Mundial

== Economy ==
Stung Treng's economy is solely based on agriculture. Various plantations such as timber, rubber and cash nuts are built all over the province. 85% of the population lives in rural parts of the province and depend on agriculture for their source of income. Animal breeding, fishing and silk weaving are also important industries in the province.

The Japan Oil, Gas and Metals National Corporation found a mineralized belt of copper and zinc in the province in 2019, and plans to step up further exploration with a Japanese partner to extract the minerals. The exploration site is about 260 kilometres north of Phnom Penh.

== Administration ==
The province is divided into 5 districts, 1 municipality, 34 communes, and 128 villages.

ISO code	District	Khmer
19-01	Sesan	ស្រុកសេសាន
19-02	Siem Bouk	ស្រុកសៀមបូក
19-03	Siem Pang	ស្រុកសៀមប៉ាង
19-04	Stung Treng Municipality	ក្រុងស្ទឹងត្រែង
19-05	Thala Barivat	ស្រុកថាឡាបរិវ៉ាត់
19-06	Borei O'Svay Sen Chey	ស្រុកបុរីអូរស្វាយសែនជ័យ

2 districts Siem Bouk and Thala Barivat in west Mekong River
