= Thmon language =

Bahnaric language spoken in Cambodia

Thmon
- Native to: Cambodia
- Language family: Austroasiatic: Bahnaric; Central; South; Thmon

Language codes
- ISO 639-3: None (mis)
- Glottolog: None

Thmon is a Bahnaric language of northeastern Cambodia.

Kraol, Thmon, Khaonh, and Mel all have about 70% lexical similarity with Stieng, a Southern Bahnaric language (Barr & Pawley 2013:32).

The Thmon live in Memom village, Kaoh Nheaek District, Mondulkiri Province. They had moved to Memom village from Benam village, Kotol commune, Sambour District, Kratie Province in 1973 due to war (Barr & Pawley 2013:28).
