= Kaoh Chbar =

- Village
- Location within Cambodia
- Coordinates: 12°54′N 106°1′E
- Country: Cambodia
- Province: Kratie Province
- District: Sambour District

Population (1998)
  - Total: 672

Kaoh Chbar (also transliterated Koh Chbar) is a village in Kaoh Khnhaer Commune, Sambour District, Kratie Province, Cambodia. It lies on the Mekong river.

== History ==
The village of Kaoh Chbar originally consisted of five households living on a small island in the Mekong River. The name Kaoh Chbar, meaning "island with plants" in Khmer, was given because of the crops that residents planted on the island.

From 1945 to 1953, the Khmer uprising against the French disrupted village life as villagers migrated between settlements to escape violence. Five households migrated from Kampong Kuy and Okreang to settle in Kaoh Chbar. In the years following Cambodia's independence, village life was challenging. Villagers lacked food, and clothing was made from old sacks. Cholera and chicken pox were common. By 1962, Kaoh Chbar's population had grown to 38 households. With little space on the island, villagers resettled by the riverbank, where the village remains today.

During the early 1970s, farming and fishing became impossible due to American bombing during Operation Menu, and villagers faced starvation. In 1975, Kaoh Chbar's population increased as Cambodians were forcibly resettled from towns and cities by the Khmer Rouge. Under the Khmer Rouge, labor was forced. Individual ownership was abolished, and all agricultural production belonged to the community. Villagers were moved from one village to another. In 1979, the village consisted of 30 households.

During the early 1980s, Kaoh Chbar's population increased to 80 households. The water level of the river was high, and fish and wildlife were abundant. In the late 1980s, the village's population increased to 90 households. Land ownership reforms were important at this time.

== Economy and transportation ==
The village economy is driven by sales of agricultural products and the use of natural resources. Subsistence fishing is also common. Richer families often possess agricultural land, tools, and draft animals to use in agriculture. They also sometimes transport resources such as timber and bamboo from nearby forests. Poorer families generally rely on selling labor for income because they lack the tools and draft animals necessary to exploit agricultural land. Daily wages as of 2002 averaged approximately 2,500-3,000 riel. These families may also hunt or gather resources such as vines or resin from the forest. Poorer families often face food shortages.

There are five grocery stores in Koh Chbar. Villagers typically purchase food, clothing, and other goods in the village, because they rarely travel to the town market. Some businessmen come to the village to purchase livestock and timber, which is difficult to transport to the market in the nearby town.

The road connecting Koh Chbar with outside towns becomes muddy and impassable in monsoon season, forcing villagers to travel to town by boat. Villagers generally travel in town by foot or by ox-cart; because the village road is poorly maintained, travel by bicycles or motorcycles is impossible.

== Governance ==
Village and commune leaders, Buddhist elders, and a Village Development Committee (VDC) lead and organize Koh Chbar, though the village's geographic size can make it difficult to manage. These authority figures are respected and reliable.

== Health, education, and development ==
There is one school with three classrooms in Koh Chbar; it provides instruction through the third grade. To continue studying, children may become monks and study at the nearest pagoda, which is relatively far from the village. Most villagers are illiterate. The few people in the village who can read and write are generally older men who had studied at the pagoda.

Villagers generally do not have access to medical services; illnesses are typically treated with traditional medicine. Though there are a few drug stores in the village, there is no quality control over drugs and there is no doctor in the village to prescribe drugs.
