= Mel language =

Mel may be,

- one of the Mel languages of West Africa
- a dialect of the Mel-Khaonh language of Cambodia
