= Prey Lang Wildlife Sanctuary =

Forest in Northern Cambodia

Prey Lang Forest
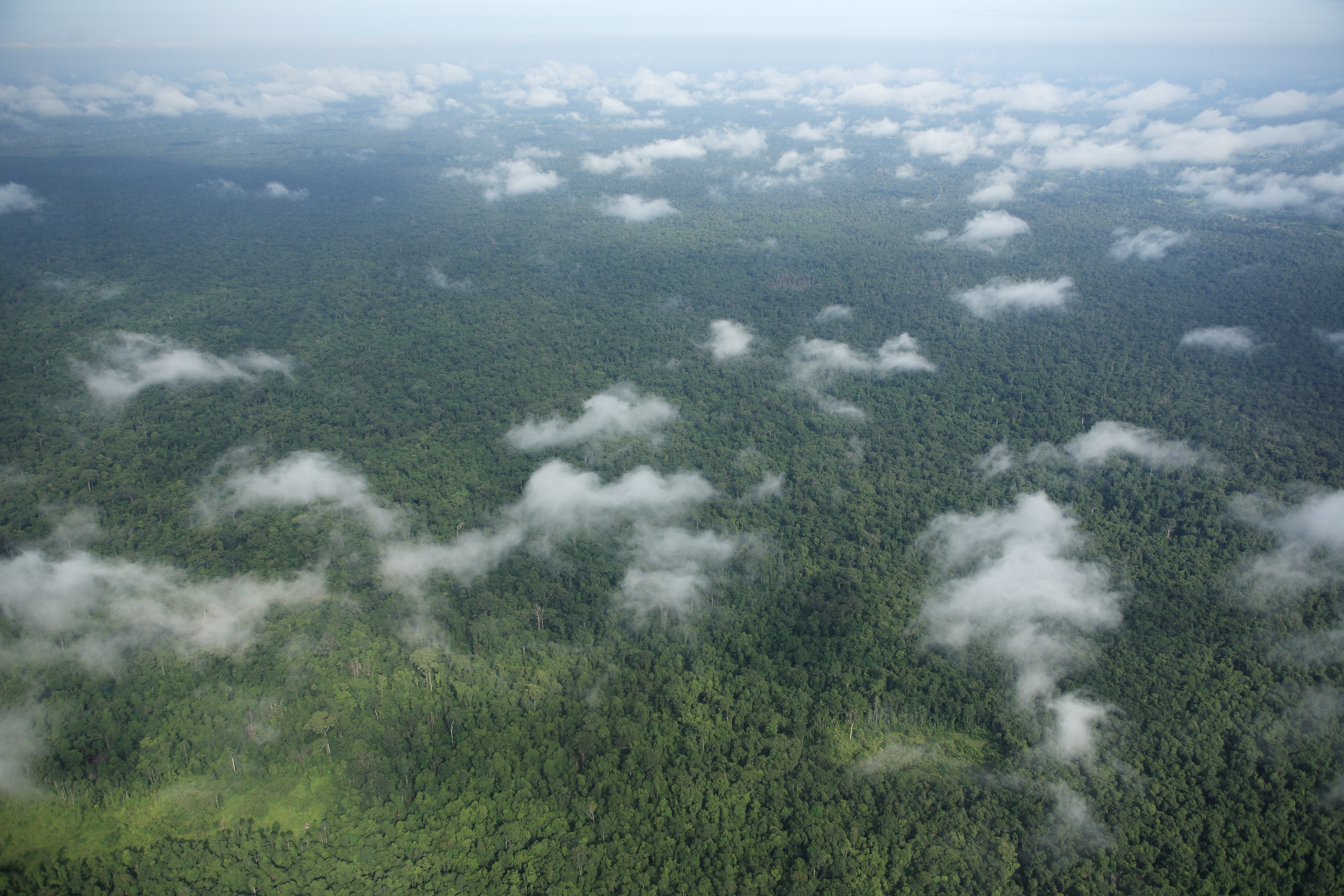
- Prey Lang Forest, Cambodia.
- Interactive map of Prey Lang Forest

Geography
- Location: Kratie Province, Stung Treng Province, Kampong Thom Province, Preah Vihear Province, Cambodia
- Coordinates: 13.174389°N 105.619171°E
- Area: 3,600 km^{2} (1,400 sq mi)

The Prey Lang Forest (/preɪ ˈlɑːŋ/; Khmer: ព្រៃឡង់, Prey Láng pronounced [prɨj lɑŋ]) is a forest in Kampong Thom, Preah Vihear, Kratie and Stung Treng Provinces in Northern Cambodia. The forest covers an estimated 3,600 square kilometres (1,390 square miles). It is one of Southeast Asia's last remaining lowland evergreen woodlands. It is the largest remaining lowland evergreen forest on the Indochinese peninsula and approximately 200,000 members of ethnic minorities live in or around the Prey Lang.

== Protected area ==
Part of the Prey Lang Forest is covered by Prey Lang Wildlife Sanctuary, first created in 2016.

== Indigenous communities ==
Prey Lang plays a central role in the lives of hundreds of thousands of people in Cambodia. Around 200,000 people, mostly members of the indigenous Kuy people, live in districts surrounding Prey Lang, a name which means "Our Forest" in the Kuy language. Prey Lang is an intricate part of their culture and spiritual life and they have depended upon it for generations, collecting resin, building materials, medicine, and food from the forest. Another 700,000 people live within 10 kilometers from Prey Lang, for whom the forest is essential as well.

== Deforestation ==
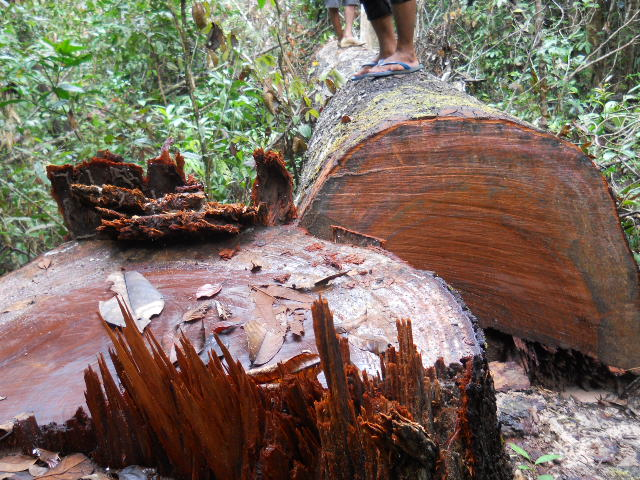
Evidence of Deforestation found by the Prey Lang Community Network.

Prey Lang is under threat from a variety of sources which have put short-sighted economic interests ahead of a nation's long-term well-being. Agribusiness plantations and mining operations are cutting away at the forest, including sensitive core areas. Illegal logging for timber, including luxury wood, is rampant, depriving communities of the resin trees they depend on. It is estimated that up to 250,000 resin trees have been lost to chainsaws. Illegal mining for precious metals and iron ore has also been on the increase, displacing artisanal, environmentally friendly operations. Toxic chemicals are being dumped into Prey Lang waterways, upsetting the area's delicate ecological balance and endangering downstream communities. In addition, new roads are cutting into important and sensitive areas of the forest, and making it easier for unscrupulous actors to illegally clear forest, transport timber, and engage in poaching.

The Northern Prey Lang landscape became operational as a REDD+ project in 2018 under Japan’s Joint Crediting Mechanism, jointly implemented by Conservation International’s Cambodia programme, Cambodia’s Ministry of Environment and Mitsui; Cambodia’s safeguards reporting described 612,525 tonnes of carbon-dioxide-equivalent credits generated through December 2023 under the mechanism.
