= Chetr Borei district =

Chetr Borei ស្រុកចិត្របុរី
- District (srok)
- District location in Kratié province
- Coordinates: 12°28′4.9″N 106°10′27.2″E
- Country: Cambodia
- Province: Kratié
- Communes: 10
- Villages: 58
- Time zone: UTC+07:00 (ICT)
- Geocode: 1006

Chetr Borei (Khmer: ស្រុកចិត្របុរី), lit. 'The Artisan city' is a district of Kratié province, Cambodia.

== Administration ==
The district is subdivided into 10 communes (khum).

=== Communes and villages ===
Khum (commune)	Phum (villages)
Bos Leav	Bos Leav Kraom, Bos Leav Leu, Lvea Tong, Preah Konlong, Preaek Kov, Preaek Ta Am, Preaek Ta Thoeng, Ta Luh
Changkrang	Changkrang, Kasang
Dar	Anhchanh, Chuor Chrey, Dar, Khnang Pos, Khsar, Mreum, Sereipheap, Stueng Svay, Ta Nguon
Kantuot	a Loch, Antong Vien, Chrava, Kantuot, Srae Non
Kou Loab	Banteay, Chrava, Kambaor, Kou Loab, Samret
Kaoh Chraeng	Kandal, Kbal Kaoh, Preaek, Roka Knaor, Voat
Sambok	Boeng Run, Kakot, Kbal Chuor, Smabok, Srae Haen
Thma Andaeuk	Chuor Krouch, Damnak Sasar, L'ak, Sampong, Serei Sokha, Srae Doung
Thma Kreae	Ruessei Char, Thma Krae Kandal, Thma Krae Leu
Thmei	Chranaol, Khnach, Krasang, Mean Chey, B'ier, Svay Chrum, Thmei, Tnaot, Treab, Veal Sambour
