= Kratié (town) =

Kratié ក្រចេះ Kracheh
- City and sangkat
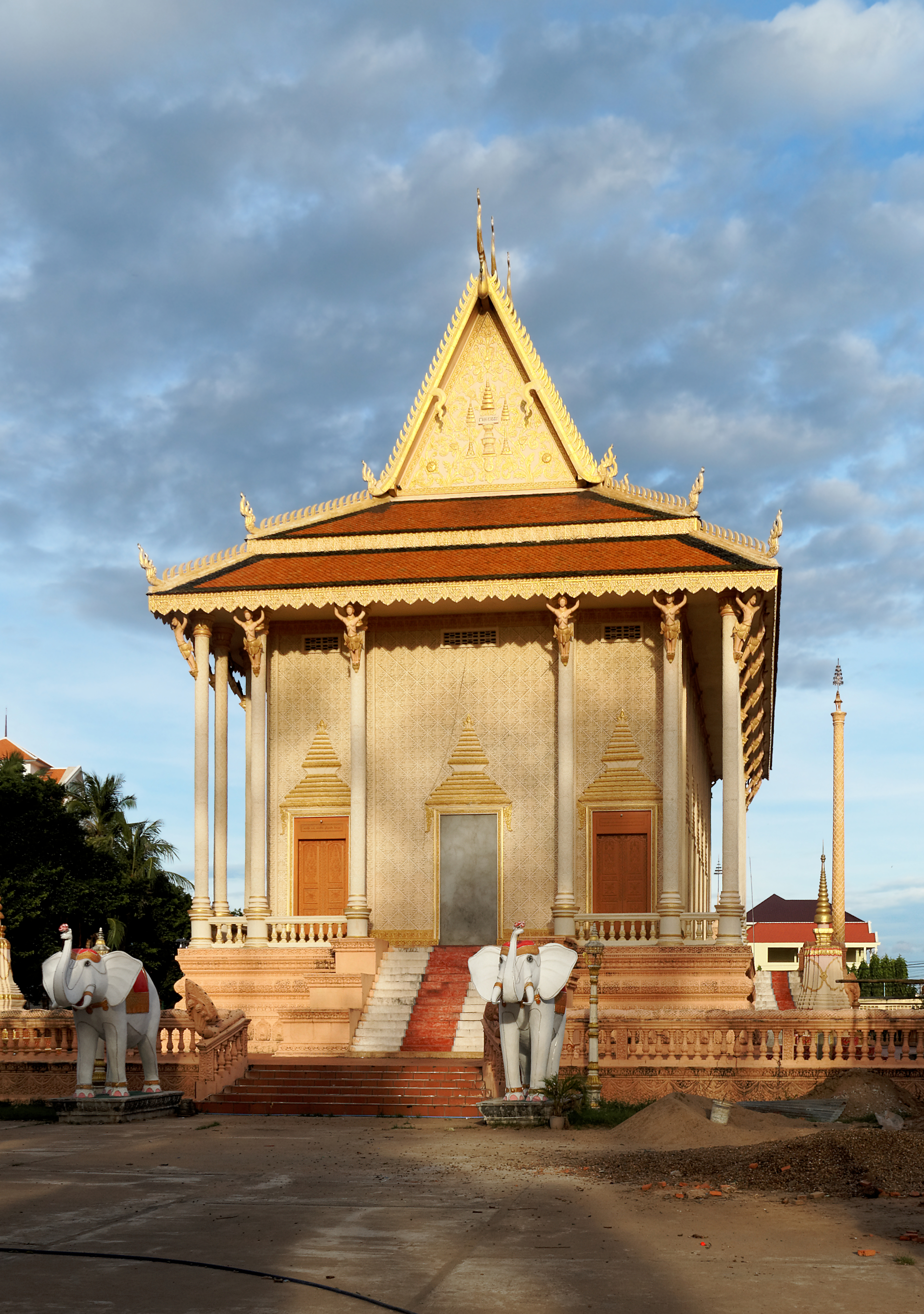

- Location within Cambodia
- Coordinates: 12°28′48″N 106°01′48″E
- Country: Cambodia
- Province: Kratié
- Municipality: Kratié
- Elevation: 17 m (56 ft)

Population (2019)
  - Total: 28,317
- Time zone: UTC+7 (ICT)

Kratié (Khmer: ក្រចេះ, Krâchéh [krɑceh]), also spelled Kracheh, is the capital of Kratié Province in eastern Cambodia. It is also a sangkat within Kratié Municipality.

== Geography ==
Kratié has a population of about 38,215 and lies on the banks of the Mekong River. The city is dominated by a central marketplace surrounded by old, French colonial buildings. Red flowered trees grow in rows along the riverbank. The town includes big islands with white sand beaches within the Mekong.

=== Fauna ===
The stretch of river north of the city is home to a group of rare Irrawaddy dolphins. The dolphins are the town's main tourist attraction. A survey conducted in 2007 by Cambodian Mekong Dolphin Conservation Project, a collaborative project between WWF, World Conservation Society Fisheries Administration, and Cambodian Rural Development Team, estimated that there are between 66 and 86 dolphins left in the upper Cambodian Mekong area.

=== Climate ===
Climate data for Kratié (1982–2024)
Month	Jan	Feb	Mar	Apr	May	Jun	Jul	Aug	Sep	Oct	Nov	Dec	Year
Mean daily maximum °C (°F)	32.5 (90.5)	33.7 (92.7)	35.6 (96.1)	35.0 (95.0)	34.4 (93.9)	33.5 (92.3)	32.7 (90.9)	33.0 (91.4)	31.9 (89.4)	32.8 (91.0)	31.8 (89.2)	31.5 (88.7)	33.2 (91.8)
Mean daily minimum °C (°F)	20.6 (69.1)	20.3 (68.5)	21.7 (71.1)	23.0 (73.4)	23.7 (74.7)	23.9 (75.0)	23.6 (74.5)	23.4 (74.1)	23.7 (74.7)	23.8 (74.8)	22.0 (71.6)	21.2 (70.2)	22.6 (72.6)
Average precipitation mm (inches)	5.8 (0.23)	25.6 (1.01)	65.1 (2.56)	90.8 (3.57)	222.3 (8.75)	253.7 (9.99)	224.5 (8.84)	275.7 (10.85)	294.2 (11.58)	204.8 (8.06)	73.9 (2.91)	10.2 (0.40)	1,746.6 (68.75)
Source: World Meteorological Organization

== Gallery ==
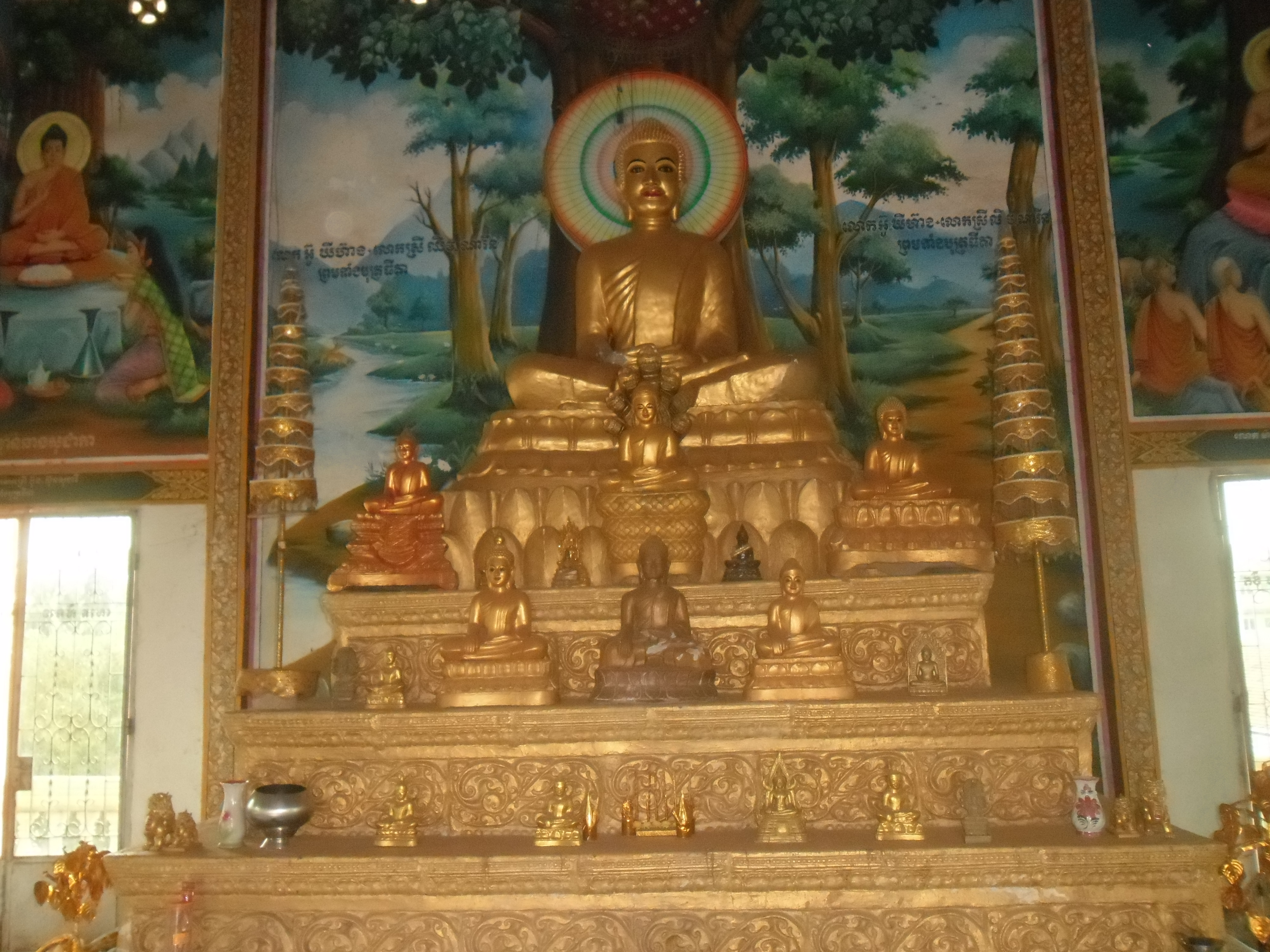

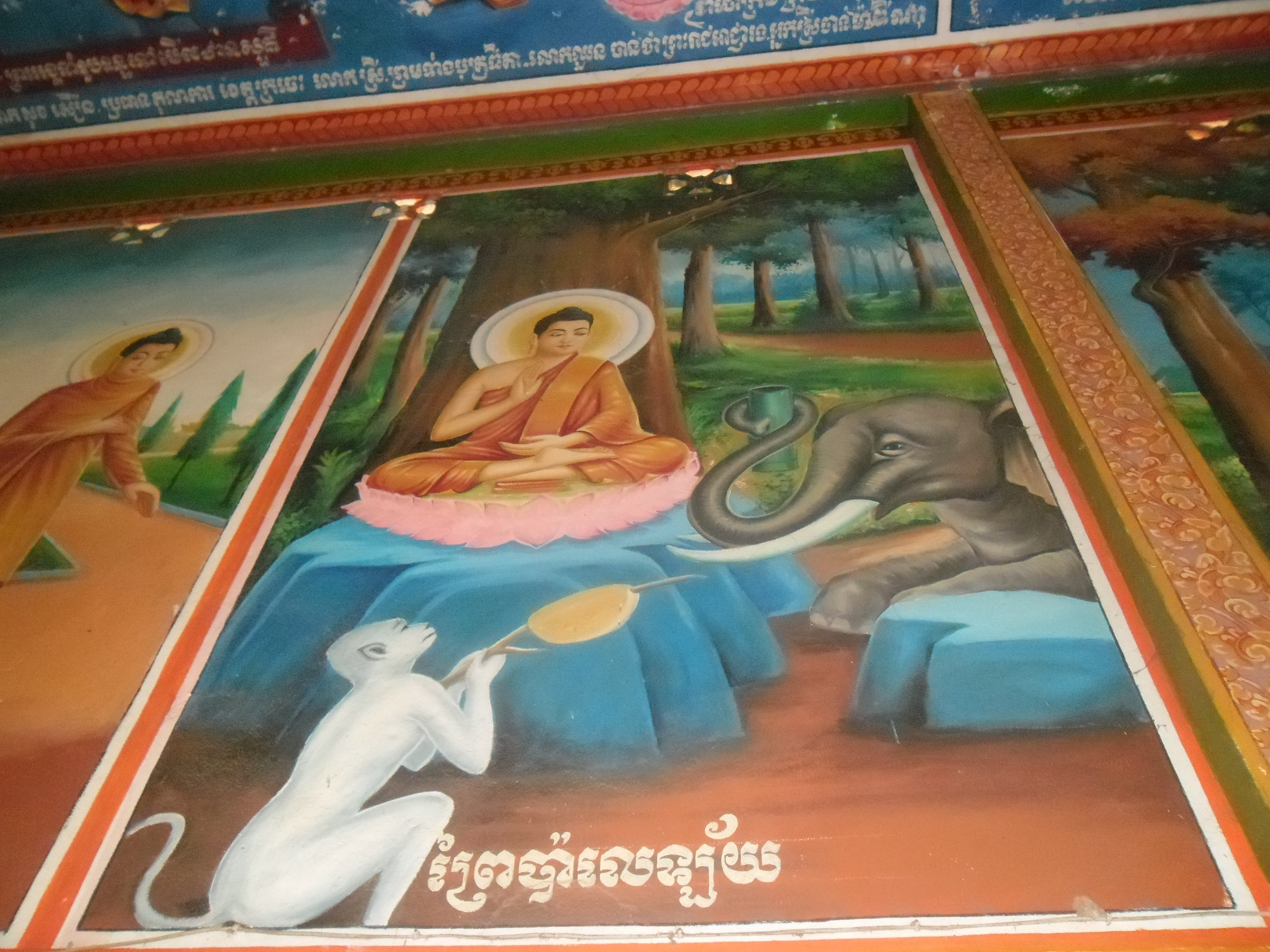

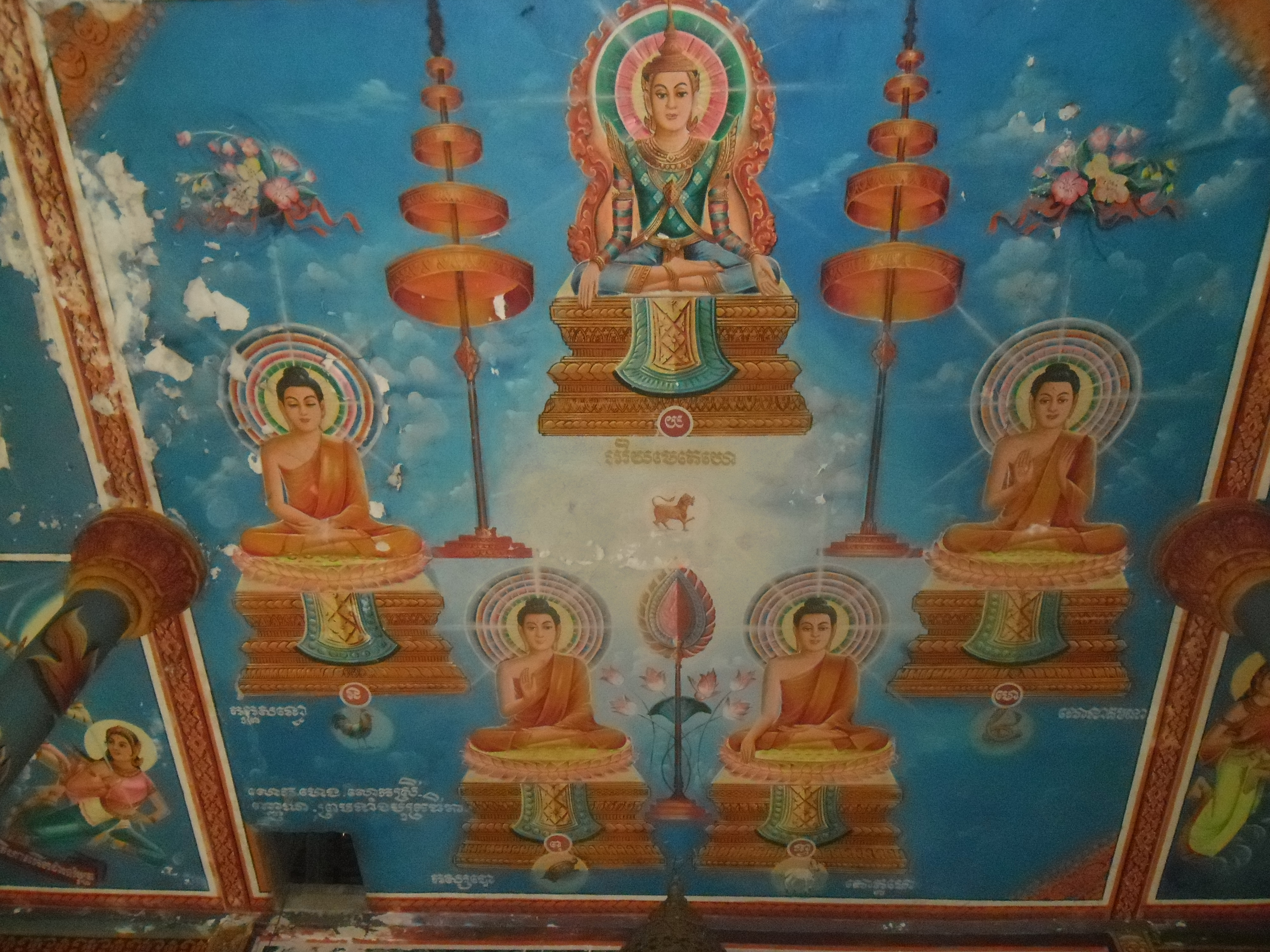

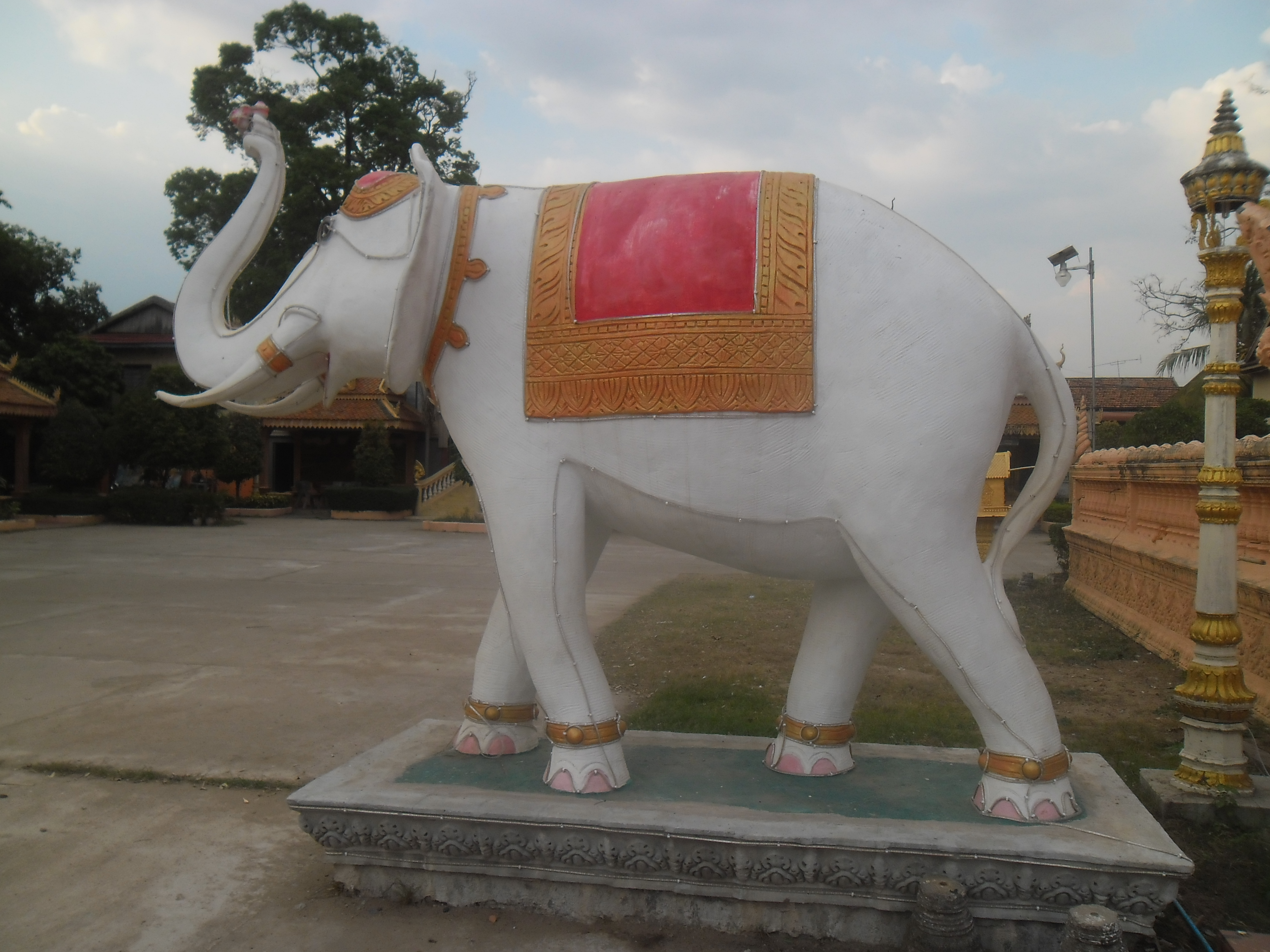

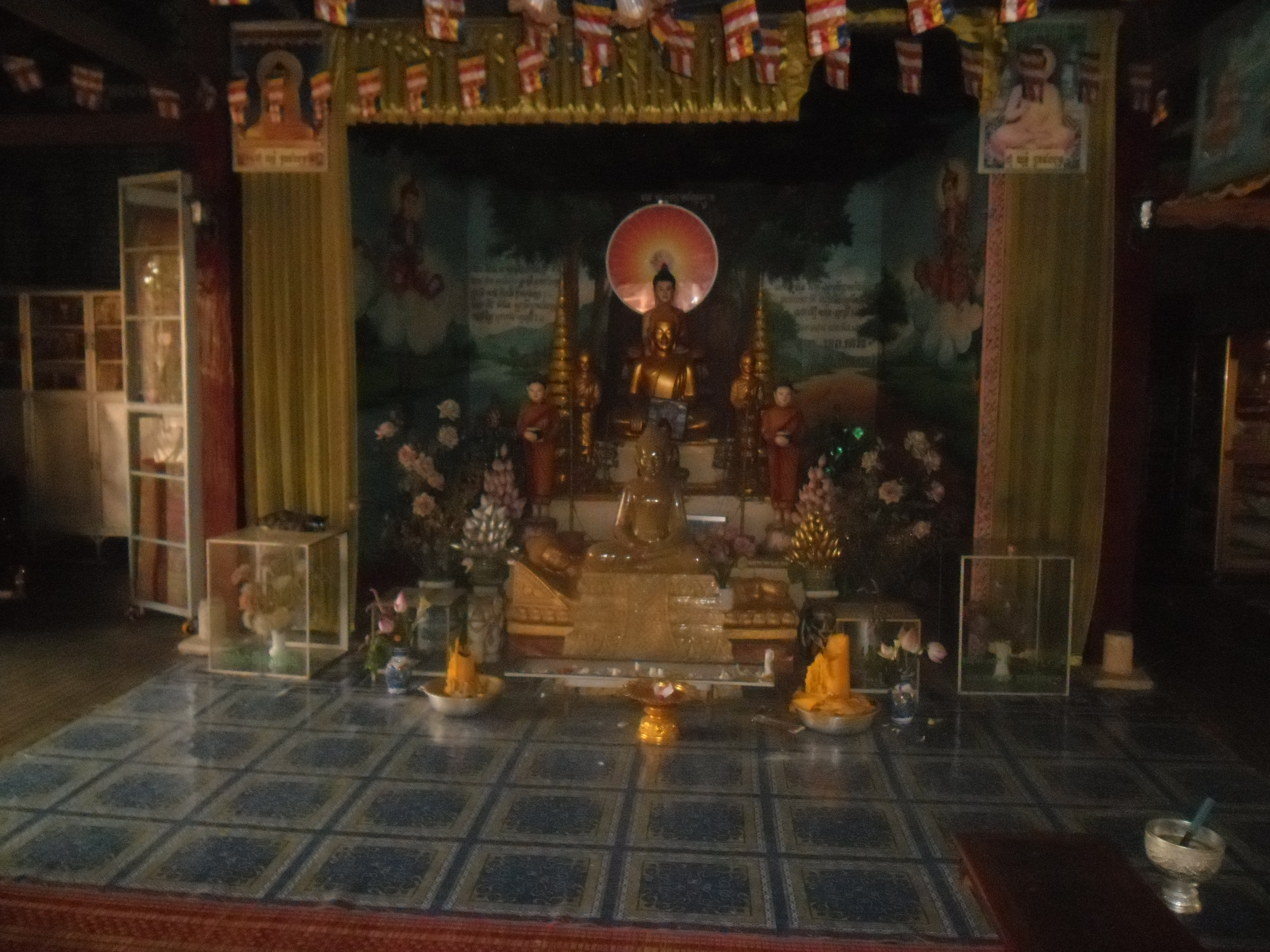

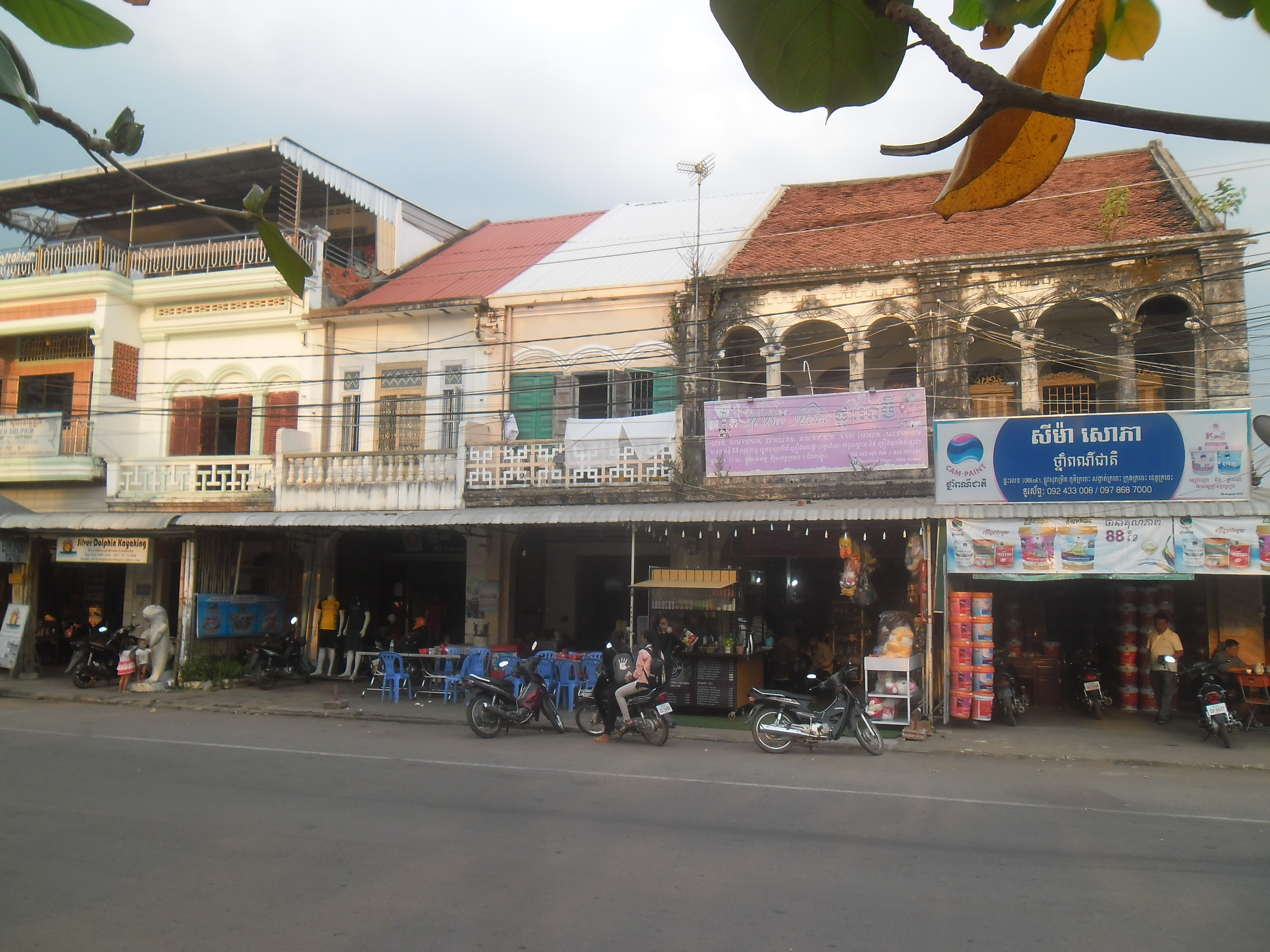

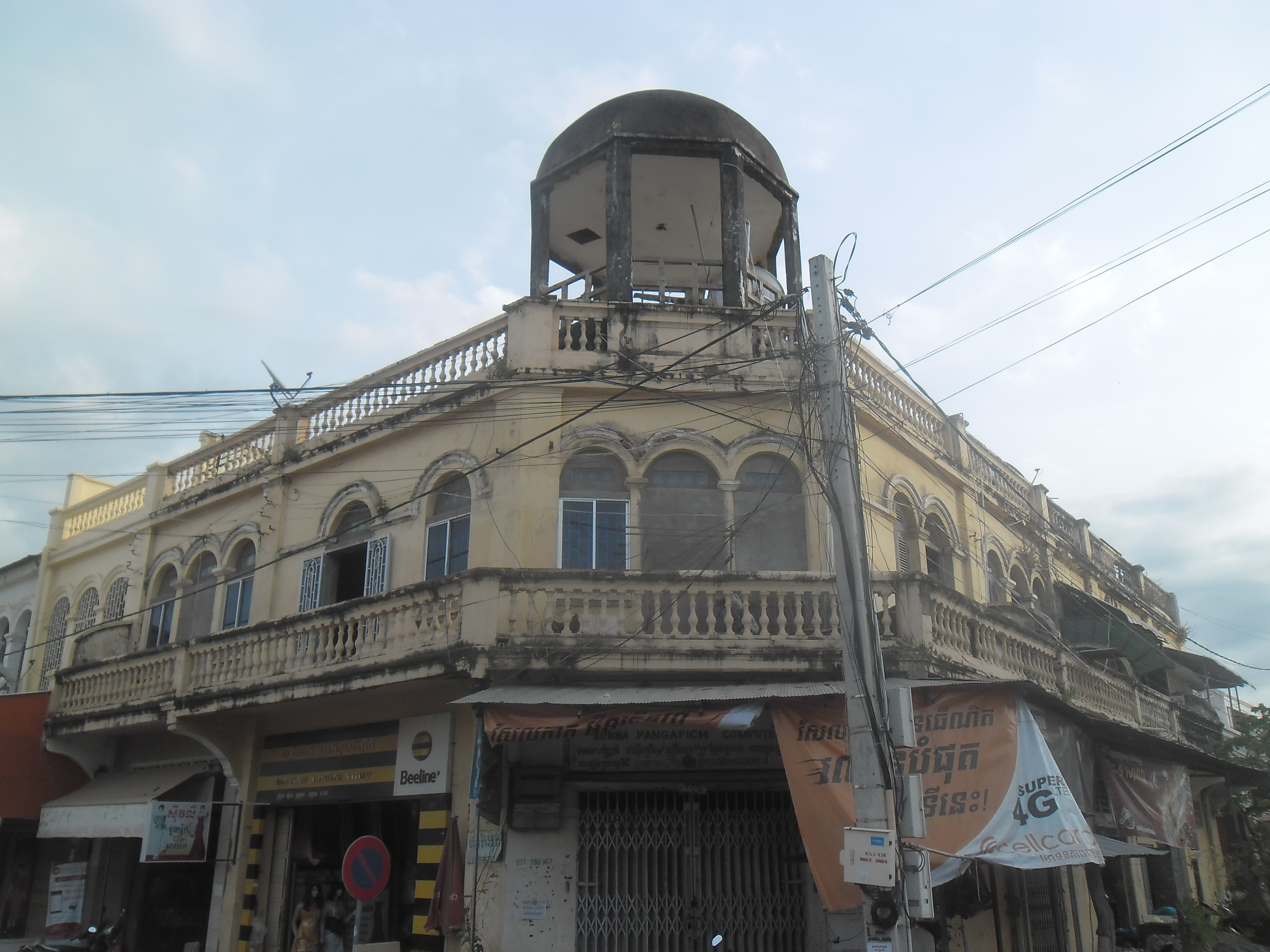

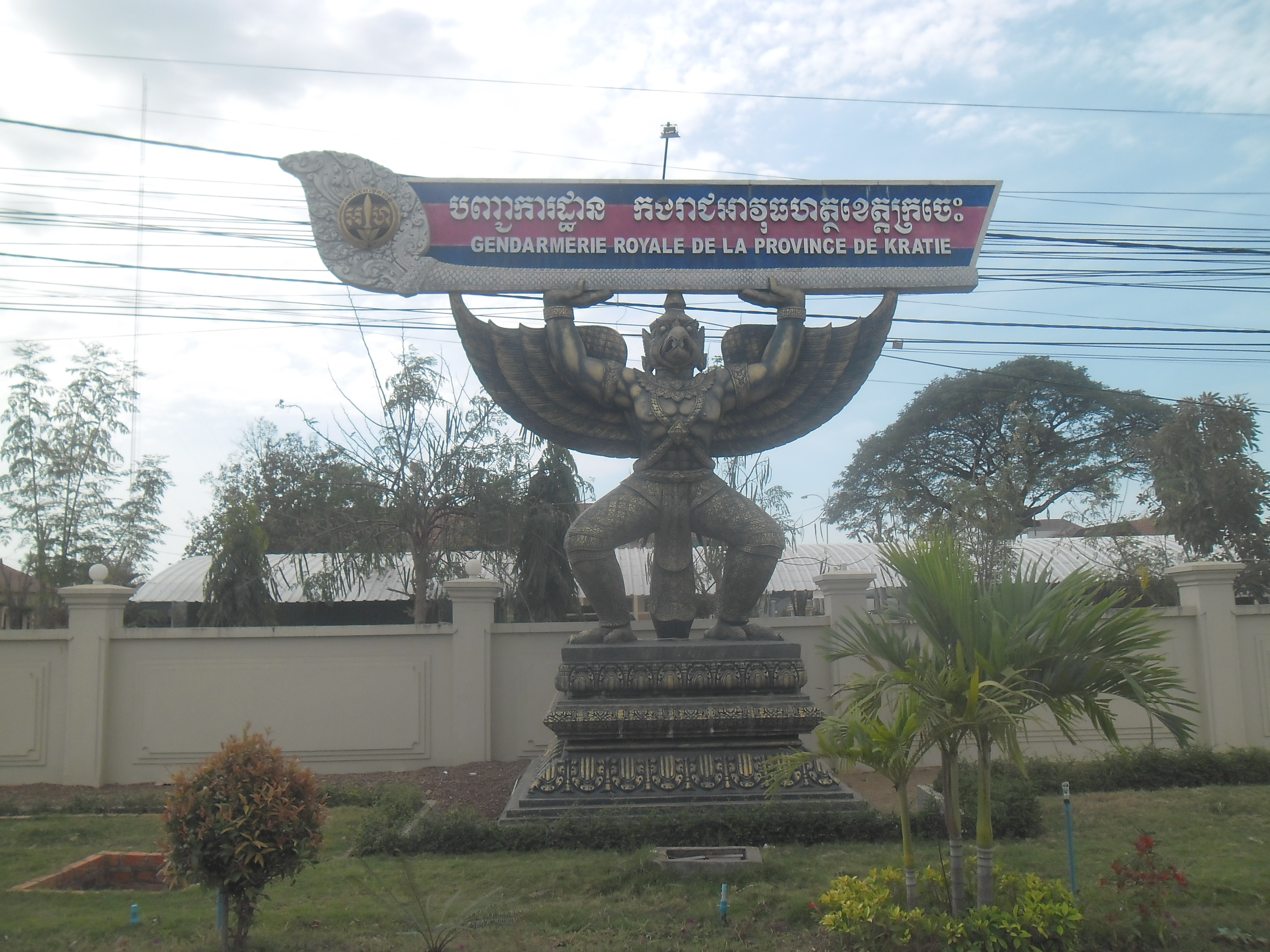

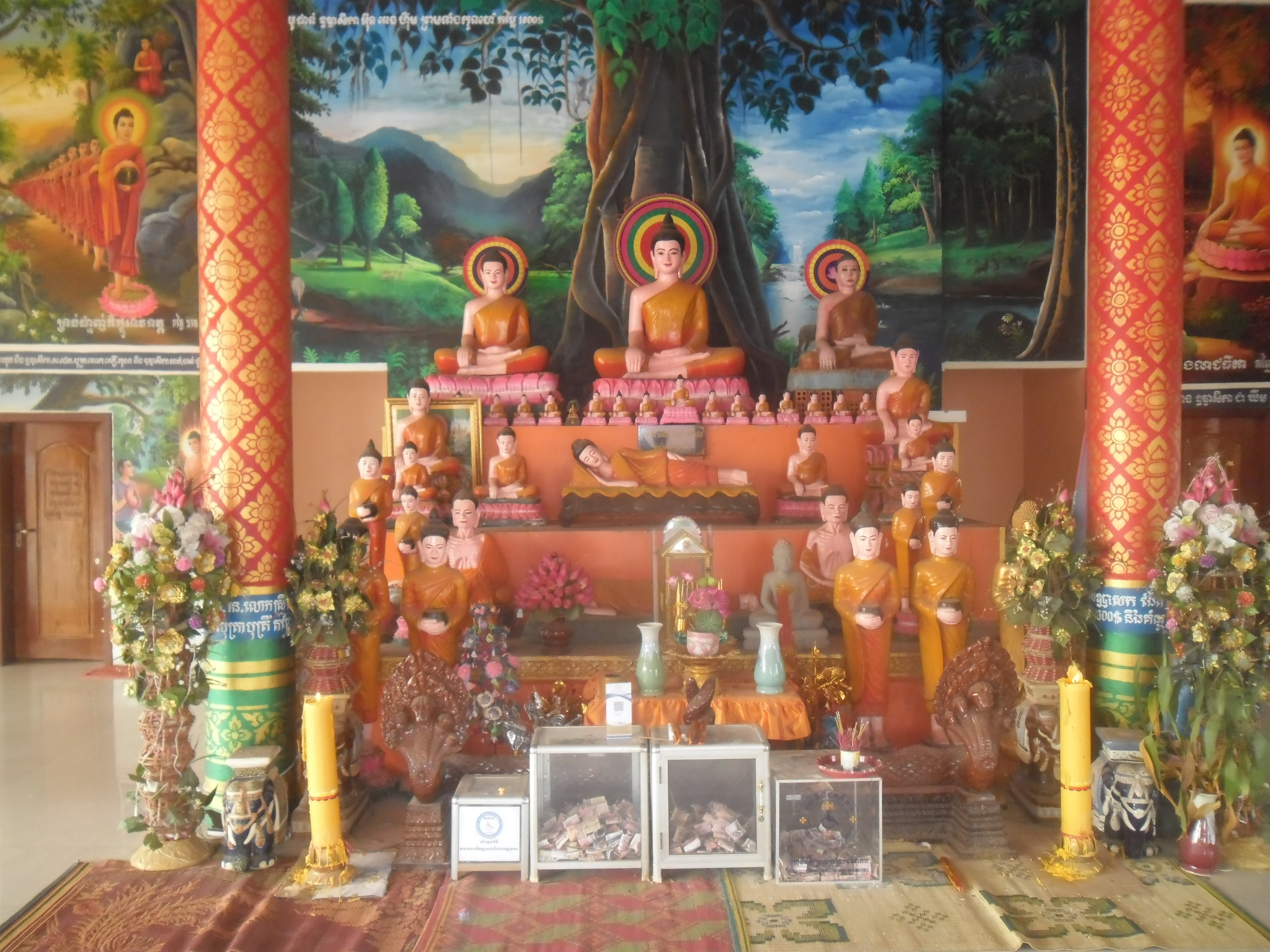

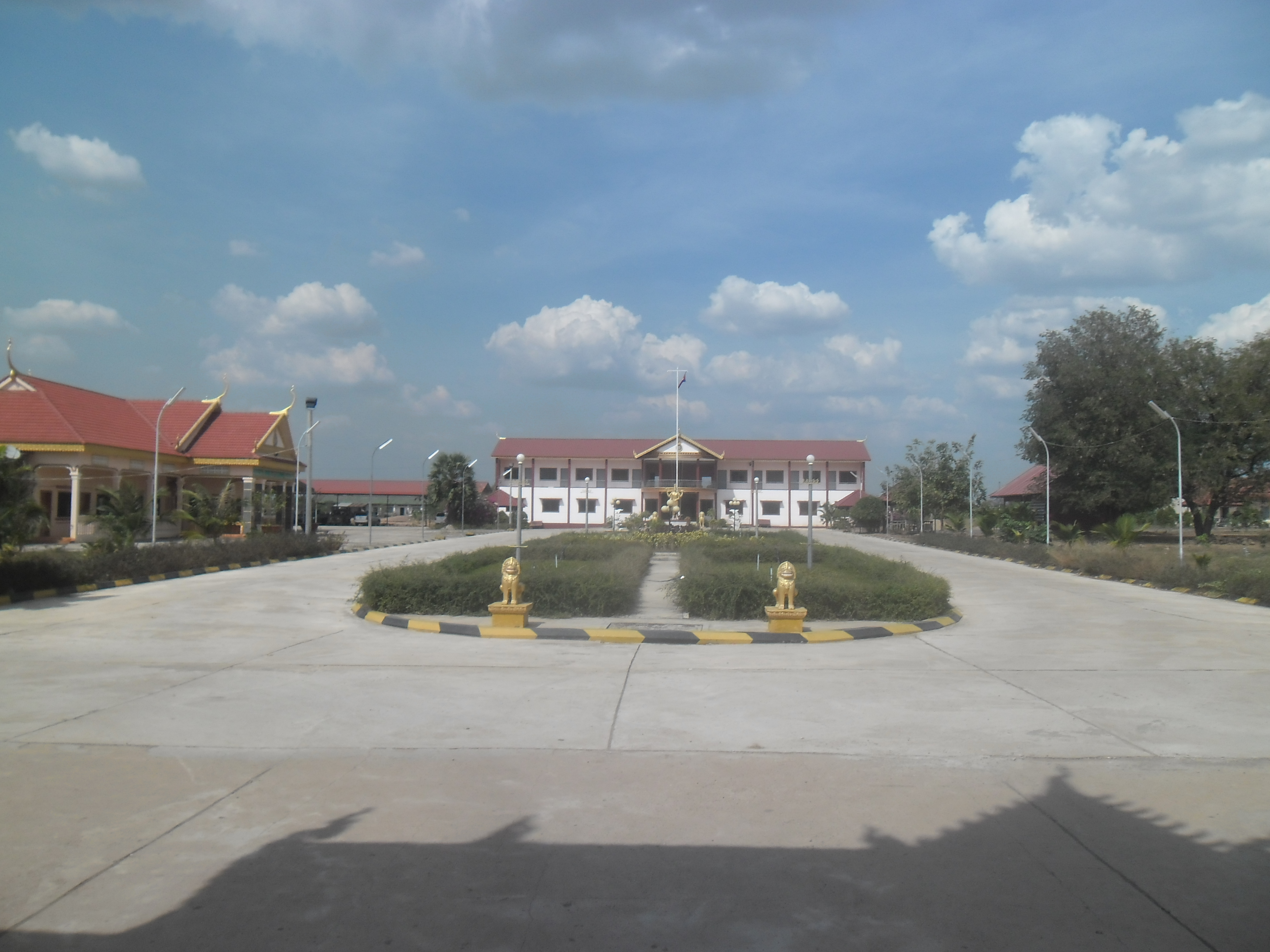

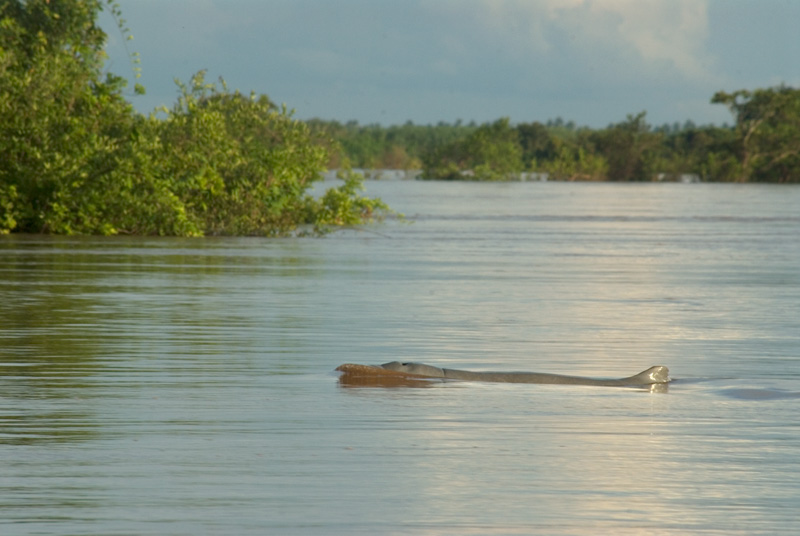
Irrawaddy dolphin in the Mekong
