= Borei O'Svay Sen Chey district =

Borei O'Svay Sen Chey បុរីអូរស្វាយសែនជ័យ
- District
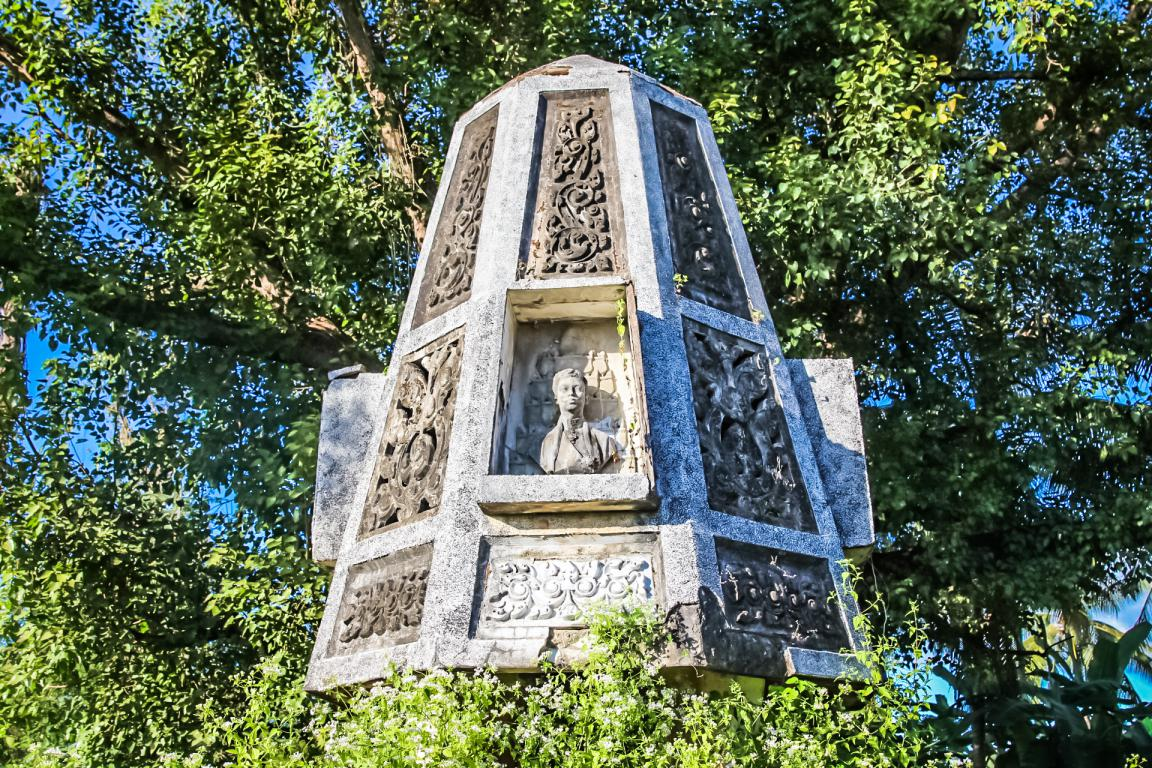
- A stupa that represents Borei O'Svay Sen Chey District

- Location in Cambodia
- Coordinates: 13°50′12.49″N 105°59′57.24″E
- Country: Cambodia
- Province: Stung Treng
- Communes: 3
- Villages: 18
- Elevation: 60 m (200 ft)

Population (2019)
  - Total: 10,707
- Time zone: +7

Borei O'Svay Sen Chey (Khmer: ស្រុកបុរីអូរស្វាយសែនជ័យ) is a newly established district located in Stung Treng province, Cambodia according to Sub Decree No. 06. Borei O'Svay Sen Chey is divided into three communes – O'Svay, Koh Sneng, and Preah Romkel – which were previously part of Thala Borivat district.

== Administration ==
The following table shows the villages of Borei O'Svay Sen Chey by communes.

ISO Code	Communes	Khmer
1906-01	O'Svay	ឃុំអូរស្វាយ
1906-02	Koh Sneng	ឃុំកោះស្នែង
1906-03	Preah Romkel	ឃុំព្រះរំកិល
