= Veun Sai-Siem Pang National Park =

National park in Cambodia

Veun Sai–Siem Pang National Park
- Location within Cambodia
- Location: Ratanakiri province and Stung Treng province, Cambodia
- Coordinates: 14°01′N 106°44′E
- Area: 57,469 ha (574.69 km^{2})
- Established: 9 May 2016
- Governing body: Ministry of Environment

Veun Sai–Siem Pang National Park is a national park in northeastern Cambodia, in Ratanakiri province and Stung Treng province. It was established in 2016 and covers 57,469 ha (574.69 km^{2}).

== Ecology ==
Veun Sai–Siem Pang National Park is dominated by lowland evergreen and semi-evergreen forest.

The park supports multiple primate species, including the endangered Northern buffed-cheeked gibbon (Nomascus annamensis), the red-shanked douc (Pygathrix nemaeus), the Annamese silvered langur (Trachypithecus margarita), the northern pig-tailed macaque (Macaca leonina), the long-tailed macaque (Macaca fascicularis), the Pygmy slow loris (Nycticebus pygmaeus), and the stump-tailed macaque (Macaca arctoides).

Auditory surveys have been used to estimate gibbon population size in the park, including an estimate of about 456 gibbon groups in 2010 and a later estimate of 389 groups (95% CI 284–542) from surveys conducted in early 2019. Illegal selective logging has been documented as widespread within the park, and gibbon group density has been analysed in relation to variables including canopy height, forest type, distance to villages and logging intensity.

== Climate ==
Ratanakiri

Climate chart (precipitation, max. and min. temperature)
J	F	M	A	M	J	J	A	S	O	N	D
10 32 20	11 33 21	42 36 25	86 36 26	160 35 26	265 32 26	325 31 25	313 31 25	256 32 25	138 32 24	52 33 24	18 32 21
- █ Average max. and min. temperatures in °C
- █ Precipitation totals in mm
- Source: Time and Date (Attopeu station, 2012–2021).
Imperial conversion
J	F	M	A	M	J	J	A	S	O	N	D
0.4 90 68	0.4 91 70	1.6 97 77	3.4 97 79	6.3 95 79	10 90 79	13 88 77	12 88 77	10 90 77	5.4 90 75	2 91 75	0.7 90 70
- █ Average max. and min. temperatures in °F
- █ Precipitation totals in inches

Veun Sai-Siem Pang National Park has a hot tropical climate with a pronounced wet season. Average rainfall rises sharply from May and remains high through October, peaking in July and August, while January and February are the driest months. Temperatures are high throughout the year, with average daily highs around 31–36 °C and average lows around 20–26 °C.

== History ==
Veun Sai–Siem Pang was managed as a conservation area by the Ministry of Agriculture, Forestry and Fisheries, with support from Conservation International, and had been expected to be designated as a protected forest. The area was designated as Veun Sai–Siem Pang National Park on 9 May 2016 by Sub-decree No. 77, covering 57,469 hectares (574.69 km^{2}) in Ratanakiri province and Stung Treng province.

In July 2023, the park's boundaries were expanded from 57,469 hectares (574.69 km^{2}) to 280,359 hectares (2,803.59 km^{2}) through Sub-decree No. 183. The change was part of a series of sub-decrees that reclassified biodiversity corridors as protected areas.

== Human impacts ==
Veun Sai–Siem Pang National Park is used by nearby communities, and forest clearing for agriculture has been reported as a driver of deforestation in parts of the park. Interviews in villages surrounding the park have documented hunting pressure on primates, including hunting and trade for traditional medicine and the pet trade. Illegal selective logging is widespread, and a 2019 survey recorded ongoing felling of high-value tree species and chainsaw activity at multiple sites. The park’s 2023 boundary expansion overlapped with existing farms and land concessions, including more than 5,000 hectares (over 50 km^{2}) of an economic land concession used for large-scale logging operations. Illegal deforestation near an economic land concession in the park was the subject of a 2024 investigation that led to the temporary detention of environmental activists. Community wardens have conducted joint patrols with park rangers as part of efforts to deter illegal logging and poaching.

A community-based ecotourism project in the park has been implemented by Conservation International Cambodia in collaboration with the TUI Care Foundation and IUCN, with stated objectives including strengthening ranger patrols and supporting livelihoods linked to ecotourism.
