= Stung Treng Municipality =

Stung Treng municipality ក្រុងស្ទឹងត្រែង Krong Stung Treng
- Municipality
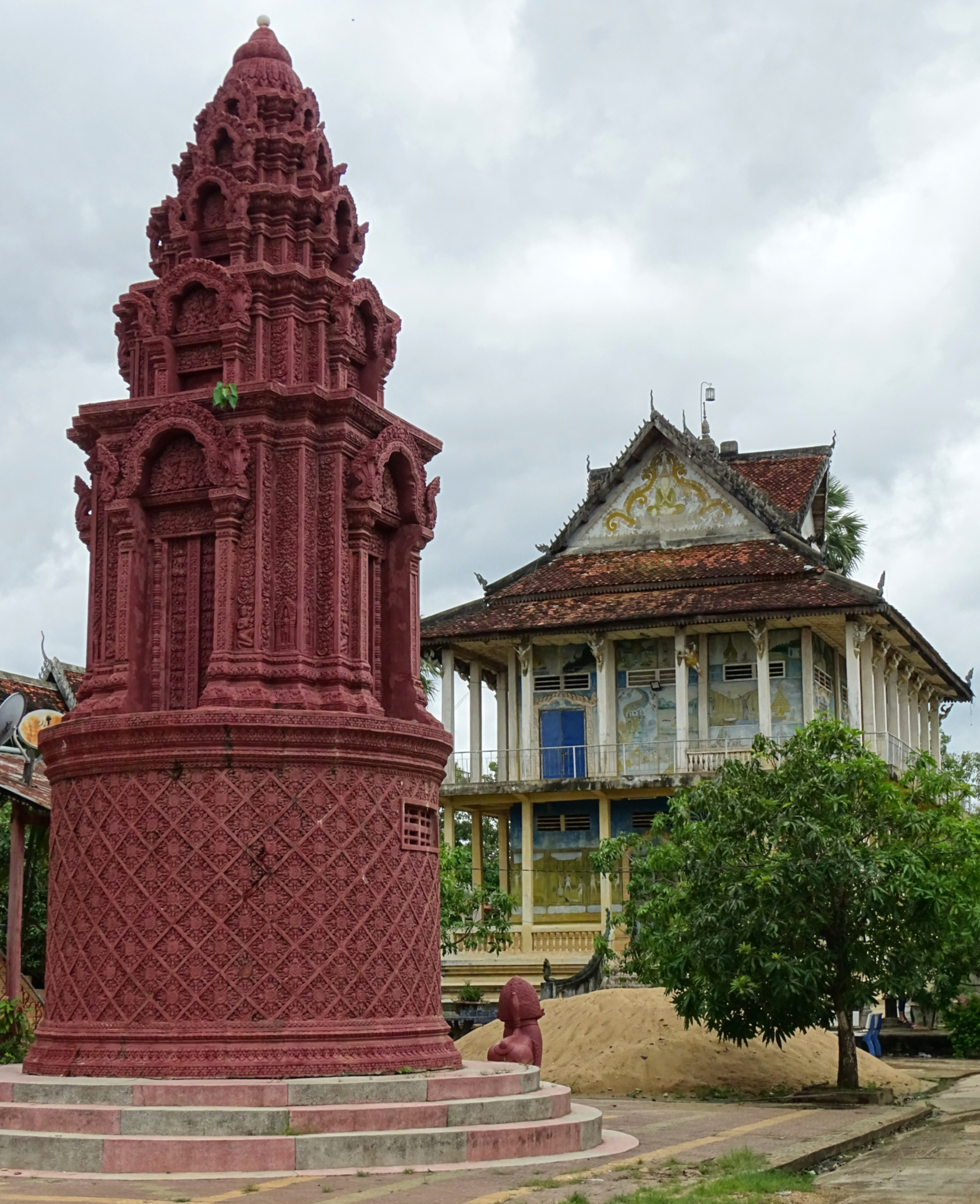

- Location in Cambodia
- Coordinates: 13°30′29″N 105°58′3″E
- Country: Cambodia
- Province: Stung Treng
- Quarters: 4
- Capital: Stung Treng

Government
  - Type: City municipality

Population (2019)
  - Total: 37 103
- Time zone: UTC+7 (ICT)
- District Code: 1904

Stung Treng (Khmer: ក្រុងស្ទឹងត្រែង) is a municipality located in Stung Treng province, in north-east Cambodia. According to the 2019 census of Cambodia, it had a population of 37,103. The provincial capital Stung Treng town is located within the municipality.

== Administration ==
The following table shows the villages of Stung Treng municipality by commune.

| ISO code | Communes | Khmer |
|---|---|---|
| 1904-01 | Stung Treng | ឃុំស្ទឹងត្រែង |
| 1904-02 | Srah Ruessei | ឃុំស្រះឫស្សី |
| 1904-03 | Preah Bat | ឃុំព្រះបាទ |
| 1904-04 | Samakki | ឃុំសាមគ្គី |
