= Kratié province =

Province of Cambodia

Kratié Province ខេត្តក្រចេះ
- Province

Khmer transcription(s)
  - Khmer: ខេត្តក្រចេះ
  - UNGEGN: Khaet Krâcheh
  - ALA-LC: Khett Kraceḥ
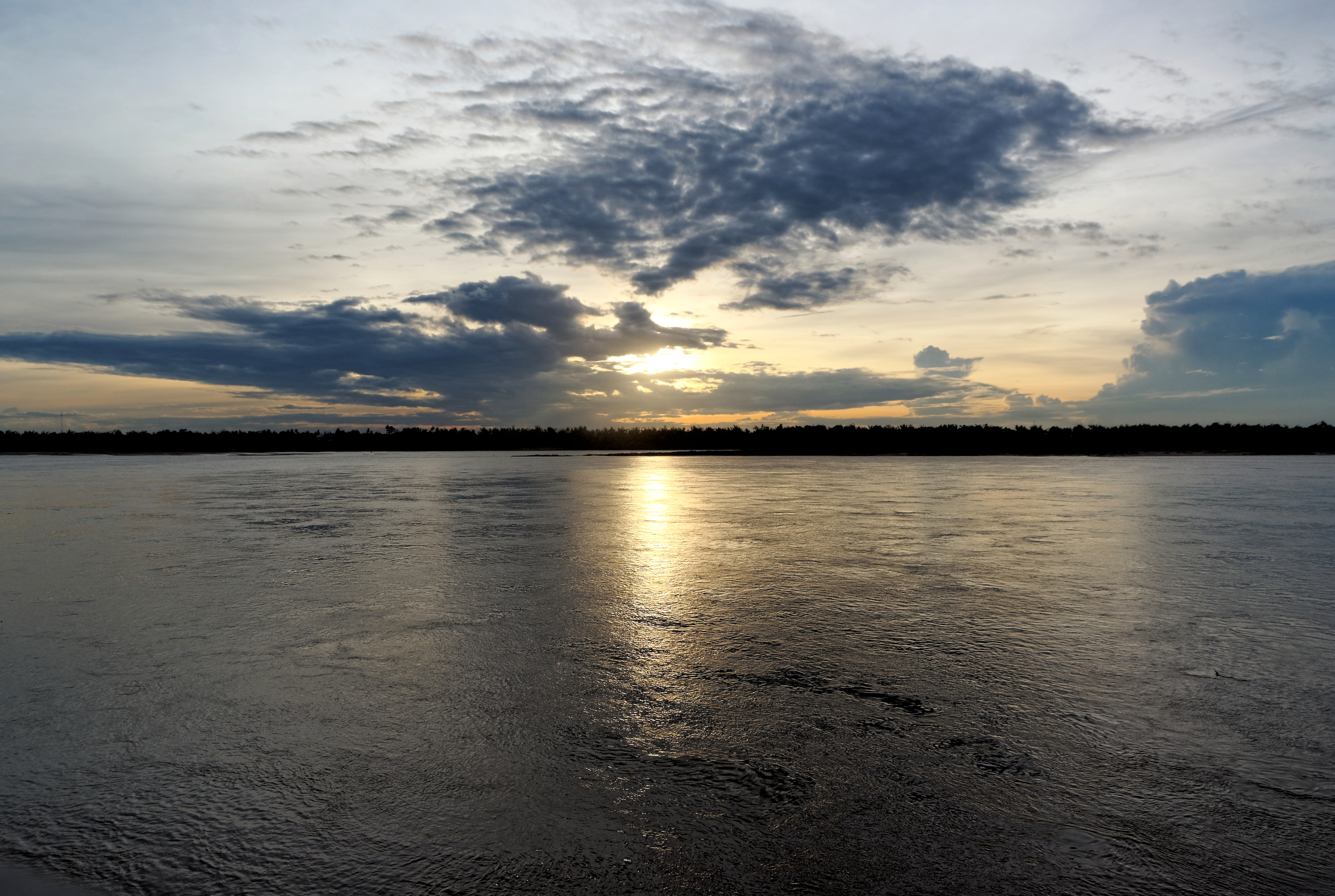
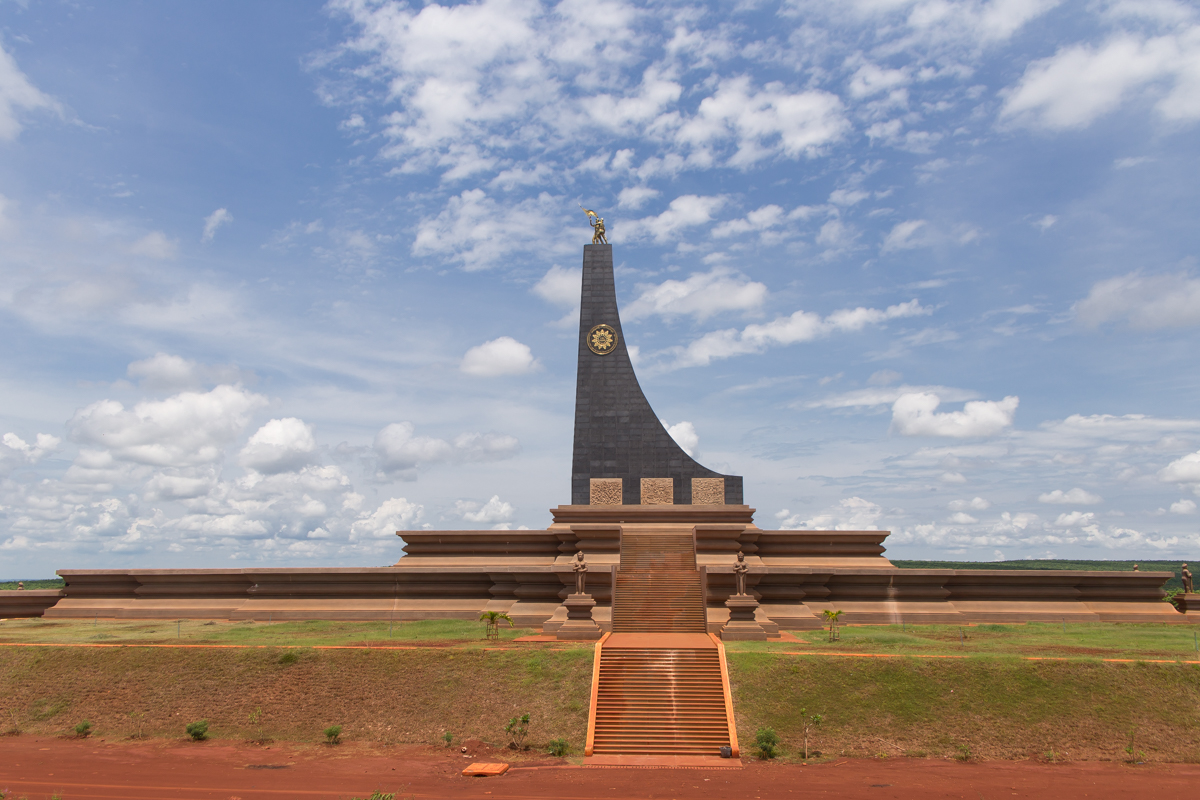
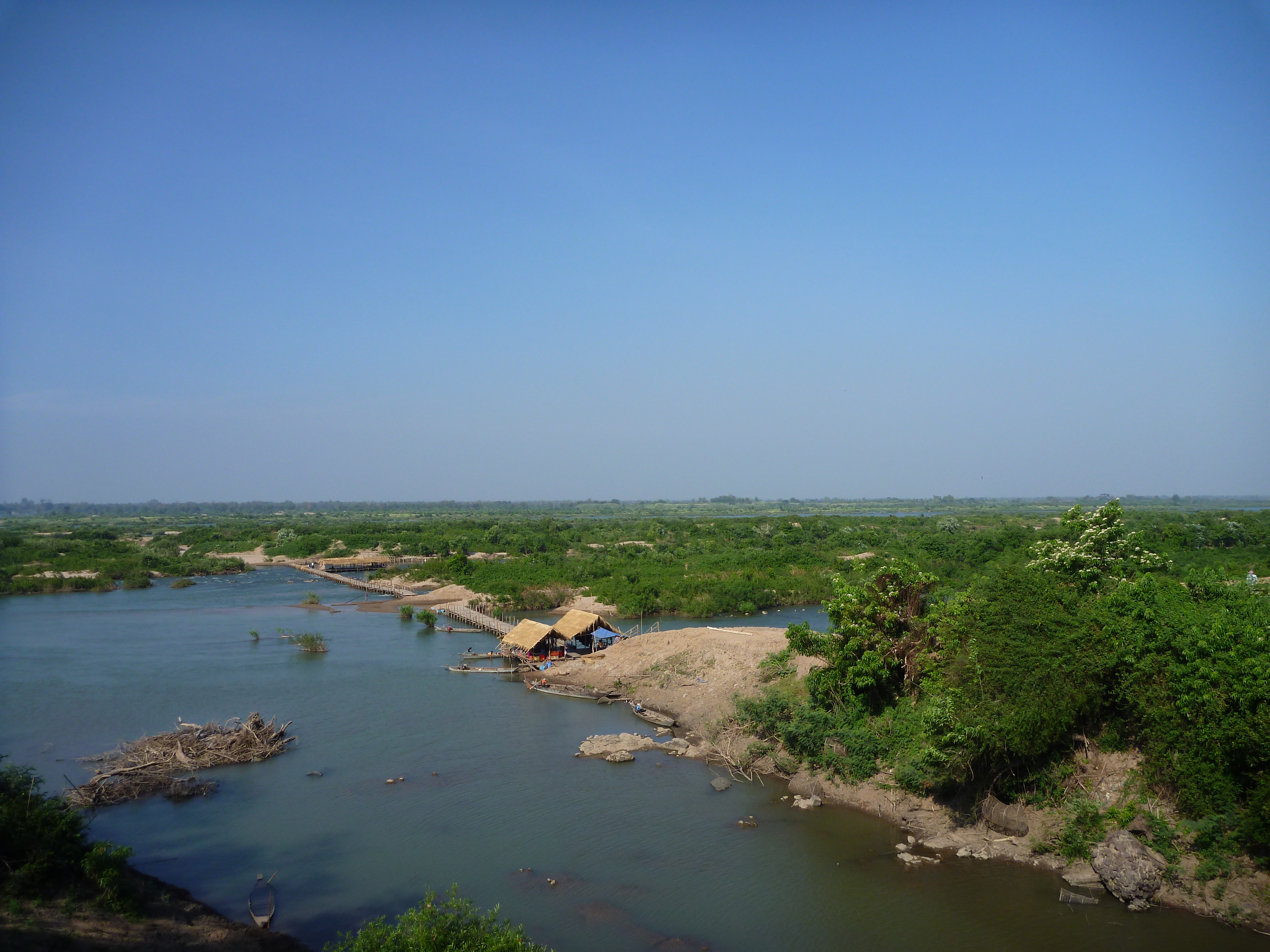

- Seal

- Map of Cambodia highlighting Kratié
- Coordinates: 12°29′N 106°1′E
- Country: Cambodia
- Provincial status: 1907
- Capital: Kratié
- Subdivisions: 1 municipality; 6 districts

Government
  - Governor: Sar Chamrong (CPP)
  - National Assembly: 3 / 125

Area
  - Total: 11,094 km^{2} (4,283 sq mi)
  - Rank: 7th

Population (2024)
  - Total: ▲441,078
  - Rank: 16th
  - Density: 34/km^{2} (88/sq mi)
  - Rank: 19th
- Time zone: UTC+07:00 (ICT)
- Dialing code: +855
- ISO 3166 code: KH-10
- Website: www.kratie.gov.kh

Kratié Province (Khmer: ខេត្តក្រចេះ, Khaet Krâcheh, [krɑː.ceh]; lit. 'kratié tree') is a province of Cambodia located in the northeast. It borders Stung Treng to the north, Mondulkiri to the east, Kampong Thom and Kampong Cham to the west, and Tboung Khmum, and the country of Vietnam to the south.

The province’s capital is the town of Kratié located within the Kratié Municipality.

== History ==
The area now known as Kratié was part of the early first millennium Kingdom of Funan until Funan itself was superseded and absorbed in the 6th century by Chenla. Sampheak Borak, the former Royal Capital during the Chenla Era, is located in Sambo District. In addition, Kratié has Vihear Sasar Muayroy Pagoda built in the 16th century. This pagoda is related to a Khmer legend Krapeur Nen Thun (Venerable Monk Thun, the Crocodile). Kratié has several temples built in the 8th century such as Khvas Pi, Pram, and Koh Kring that has perfect deities, ancient halls, Khmer ancient houses, and French-style buildings. The area near Kratié along the Mekong River was one of the most densely populated regions of the pre-Angkorian era of Cambodia.

Lon Nol was the province's governor in 1945. During the Vietnam and Cambodian Civil Wars and the subsequent Vietnamese presence against Khmer Rouge in Cambodia, intense fighting took place in Kratié. Operation Menu, the 1969-1970 United States bombing campaign targeting Vietnamese supply routes and bases in Cambodia and Laos, resulted in heavy bombardment of Kratié. Recovering unexploded ordnance and de-mining has been a major initiative since at least the mid-2000s.

On December 30, 1978, Vietnamese forces captured Kratié to fight against Khmer Rouge.

== Geography ==
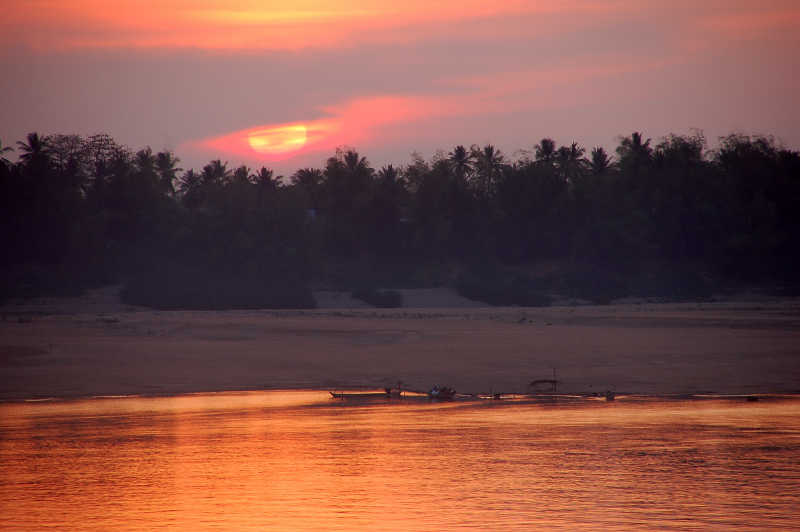
Sunset along the river

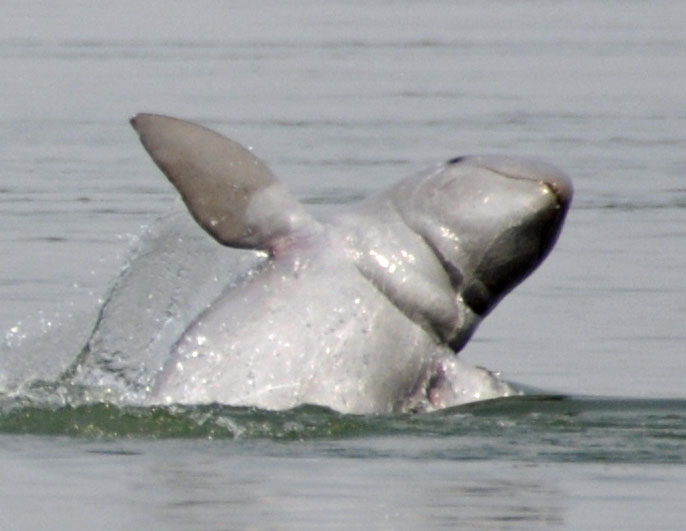
Closeup Irrawaddy dolphin jumping in Mekong River

The Mekong River flows from the north to the south of the province; approximately 140 km of the river is located in Kratié. The river is home to Irrawaddy dolphins, fish, and birds. The flow of the Mekong River at Kratié town varies greatly. There are hundreds of seasonally flooded islands in the river. As of 2007, the Cambodian government planned to build a dam on the Mekong River near Kratié town. The province also contains many forests, the Phnom Pram Poan mountain range, Phnom Prech, and rubber plantations. Eastern Kratié is an important bird area.

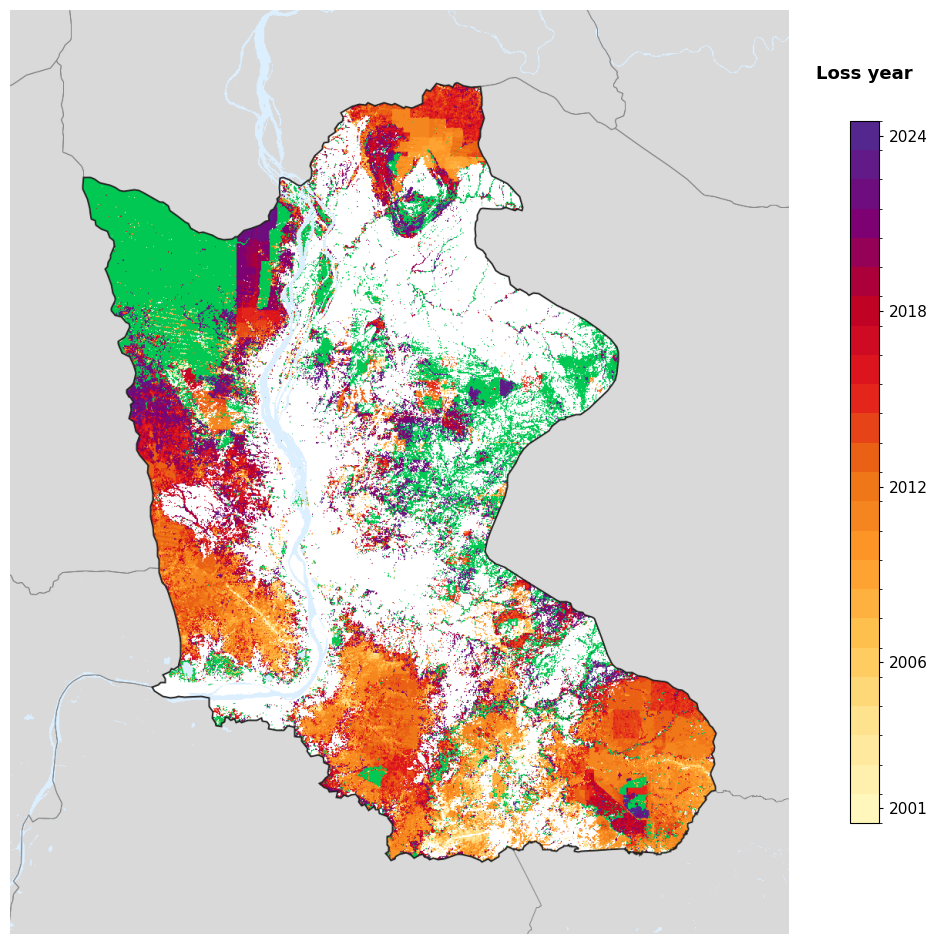
Tree-cover loss year in Kratié, 2001-2024, from the Global Forest Change dataset.

The province is mostly covered in dense forest. Craters from Operation Menu bombings during the Vietnam War, some of which are filled with water, are still visible in the countryside. Some land in Kratié is used for agriculture, though a smaller percentage than elsewhere in Cambodia.

The province has a monsoonal climate, with a cool season from November to March, a hot season from March to May, and a rainy season from May to October. Flooding is frequent in Kratié; the Mekong may overflow by as much as 4 m during the rainy season.

Kratié is known for its attractive riverside scenery and its green villages and paddies, and the river dolphins.

Kratié's fisheries are part of the Upper Mekong River Zone, which is important support for migratory species and subsistence fishing but does not play a major role in commercial fishing.

Forests in Kratié tend to be open and less dense than elsewhere in Cambodia; they are generally made up of deciduous trees that lose their leaves during the dry season. Prey Lang Wildlife Sanctuary spans multiple provinces including Kratie, and has been the site of a registered REDD+ project under Japan’s Joint Crediting Mechanism coordinated by Conservation International’s Cambodia programme.

== Government ==
Sar Cham Rong is the governor of Kratié province and Hoeu Sidem is the deputy governor. In the 2007 commune council elections, the vast majority of seats went to members of the Cambodian People's Party. Women make up 17.4% of commune council members. In 2005, Kratié received 1.69 billion riel from the commune/sangkat fund, of which development funds were 1.20 billion riel and funds for administration were 0.49 billion riel.

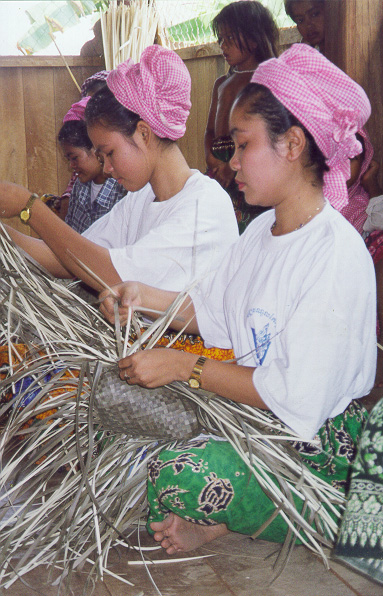
Cham woman weaving baskets

== Economy and transportation ==
Rice cropping plays an important role in the provincial economy

Most Kratié residents are subsistence farmers or fishers. 78% of residents are employed in agriculture. Thirty percent of Kratié households live on less than US$1 per day; the province's poverty rate of 32% is somewhat lower than the national average of 39%. Some gold mining occurs in Kratié. Most soil in Kratié is poor; the province primarily grows perennial industrial crops like rubber. Kratié has the potential to be an ecotourism destination. Kratié's road system is poorly developed. As of 1998, the average household possessed 0.48 hectares of agricultural land, and 37% were landless.

== Social issues ==
Land concessions often cover land customarily owned or used by people in Kratié province. In 2004, community land organizers were threatened by the military after they confiscated chainsaws used for illegal logging. An indigenous people's organization is active in Kratié province.

== Health, education, and development ==
Schistosomiasis is a problem in Kratié province. The incidence of malaria and dengue fever rose sharply in the mid-2000s; this increase has been attributed to changes in climate. Malaria is hyperendemic in Kratié's forests. The provincial infant mortality rate of 97/1,000 and child mortality rate of 80/1,000 are significantly higher than the national average (68/1,000 and 53/1,000, respectively).

Kratié is one of the poorest provinces in Cambodia but, in 2015, was ranked fifth in the nation for the high-school exam pass rate. Schools struggle to attract teachers to the poor and overwhelmingly rural province. Teachers are sent to the province from Phnom Penh, the nation's capital, but they are new teachers who see an opportunity to pass a teacher's exam that is less rigorous in remote areas. These new teachers rarely stay more than a year or two due to the low pay, leaving local officials having to do without and students often having to continue studies by themselves.

== Demographics ==
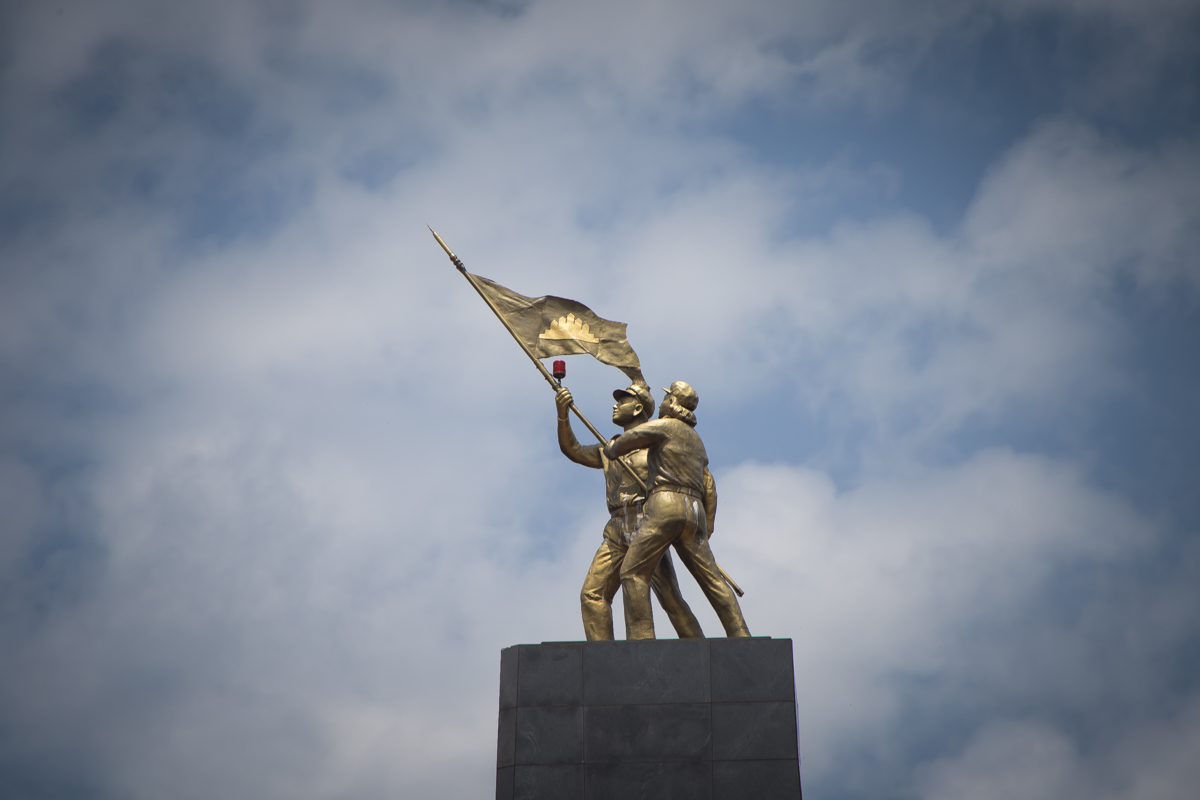
The 2 December Memorial

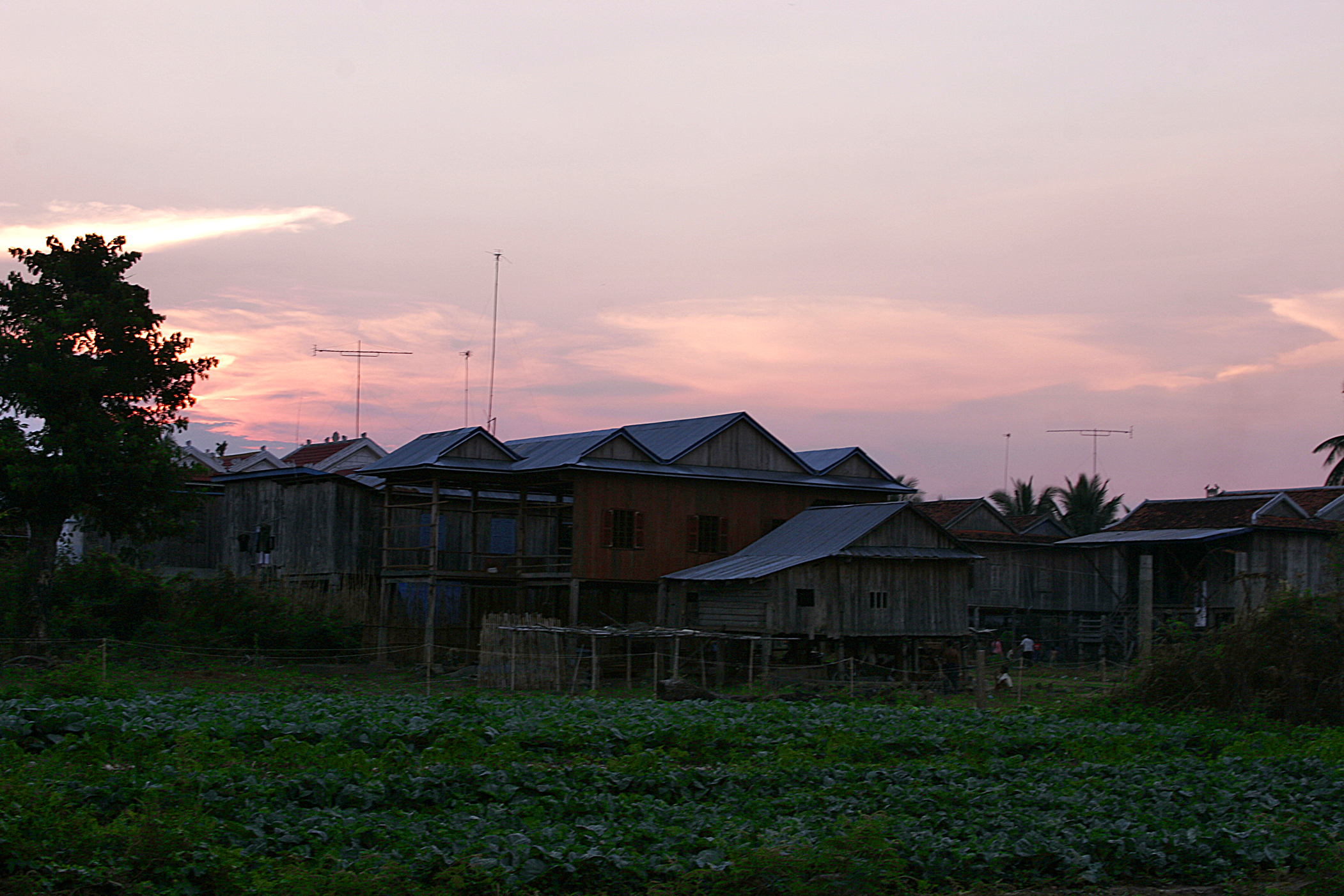
Sunset over houses on the outskirts of the town of Kratié

There is a substantial Vietnamese minority in Kratié province. Kratié is home to seven indigenous groups: Bunong, Kouy, Mil, Khonh, Kraol, Steang, and Thamoun. Approximately 70% of the province's residents live along the Mekong River; the area beyond the river is sparsely populated. Approximately 8% of Kratié's population is indigenous; it is one of four provinces with a substantial indigenous population. 70% of the population is rural.

== Religion ==
Religion in Kratié province (2019 census)
1. Buddhism (93.1%)
2. Islam (6.60%)
3. Christianity (0.20%)
4. Animism and Other religions (0.10%)

The state religion is Theravada Buddhism. More than 93.1% of the people in Kratié province are Buddhists. About 6.6% population of Kratié province follow Islam followed by Chams. Christianity is followed by 0.2% in the province, while Animism or other religions followed by 0.1%.

== Administrative subdivisions ==
Kratié province is subdivided into 6 districts (srok) and 1 municipality (krong), further divided into 47 communes (khum).

ISO code	Name	Khmer	Population
10-01	Chhloung	ឆ្លូង	50,407
10-02	Kratié	ក្រុងក្រចេះ	79,123
10-03	Preaek Prasab	ព្រែកប្រសព្វ	56,757
10-04	Sambour	សំបូរ	41,732
10-05	Snuol	ស្នួល	61,603
10-06	Chetr Borei	ចិត្របុរី	
10-07	O'Kreang Senchey	អូរគ្រៀងសែនជ័យ	

1 district Preaek Prasab in west Mekong River
