= Kratié Municipality =

Kratié Municipality ក្រុងក្រចេះ Krong Kratié
- Municipality
- Interactive map of Kratié Municipality
- Country: Cambodia
- Province: Kratié

Population (1998)
  - Total: 79,123
- Time zone: UTC+07:00 (ICT)
- Geocode: 1002

Kratié Municipality (Khmer: ក្រុងក្រចេះ) is a municipality (krong) located in Kratié province, in Cambodia.

== Administration ==
The district is subdivided into 5 communes (khum).

Name	Khmer	Villages
Kaoh Trong	កោះទ្រង់	Kbal Kaoh, Chong Kaoh
Krakor	ក្រគរ	Krakor, Tuol Monorom
Kratié	ក្រចេះ	Doun Chroam, Kratié, Phsar Veng, Trapeang Pring, Wat
Orussey	អូរឫស្សី	Kantring, Kapou, Orussey I, Orussey II, Srae Sdau
Roka Kandal	រកាកណ្ដាល	Roka Kandal I, Roka Kandal II
