= Global warming taxes =

Taxes intended to mitigate the human effect on global warming

In response to widespread concerns about a general increase in the temperature of the Earth's climate, a number of tax jurisdictions have proposed or imposed global warming taxes intended to generate revenues to mitigate the effects of the human activities contributing to global warming or to discourage such activities.

== History ==
The idea of using taxes to fix problems, rather than merely raise government revenue, has a long history. The British economist Arthur Pigou advocated such corrective taxes to deal with pollution in the early 20th century. In his honor, economics textbooks now call them “Pigovian taxes.”

Using a Pigovian tax to address global warming is also an old idea. It was proposed as far back as 1992 by Martin S. Feldstein, once chief economist to Ronald Reagan, on the editorial page of The Wall Street Journal.

== Jurisdictions Imposing Global Warming Taxes ==
=== California ===
- San Francisco Bay Area Air Quality Management District has proposed a carbon dioxide emission fee that would charge businesses 4.2 cents for every metric ton of carbon dioxide released. The estimated $1.2 million in fees raised annually on businesses in the nine-county San Francisco Bay Area region would start July 1, 2008, and are not intended to deter greenhouse gas production in most cases, but would pay for the cost of monitoring greenhouse gases.
- California Assembly Bill 2358 will take the existing $34 vehicle registration fee and add up to an extra $25 based on the unladen weight of the vehicle. A second tax of up to $25 would be added based on the level of carbon dioxide emissions. Together, the new fees would more than double the total possible registration fee to $84.
- California Assembly Bill 2558 would give the Los Angeles County Metropolitan Transportation Authority, which operates bus and light rail service, the authority to impose either a three-percent sales tax on gas (11 cents per gallon at current prices) or a $90 hike in vehicle registration taxes. Funds raised from motorists would then be placed in a Climate Change Mitigation and Adaptation Fund that would be used on "public transit projects and programs."
