= Conservation International Cambodia =

Country programme of Conservation International in Cambodia

- Abbreviation: CI Cambodia
- Formation: 2001
- Type: Country programme
- Headquarters: Phnom Penh, Cambodia
- Location: Koh Kong Province (Thma Bang District), Cambodia
- Region served: Cambodia
- Parent organization: Conservation International
- Website: cambodia.conservation.org

Conservation International Cambodia (CI Cambodia) is the Cambodia country programme of Conservation International. Conservation International began work in Cambodia in 2001, and CI Cambodia undertakes biodiversity conservation activities including forest and protected-area conservation, freshwater conservation linked to Tonlé Sap, and conservation finance initiatives such as REDD+ projects.

CI Cambodia's work includes programmes in the Cardamom Mountains landscape, a REDD+ project in the Prey Lang Wildlife Sanctuary landscape, and conservation activities in Veun Sai-Siem Pang National Park.

== Overview ==
CI Cambodia supports conservation activities in Cambodia through programmes linked to protected areas and landscapes, including the Cardamom Mountains and Veun Sai-Siem Pang National Park, and freshwater-linked work around Tonlé Sap. Conservation finance initiatives associated with its work have included conservation agreements in the Central Cardamom Protected Forest and participation in a REDD+ project in the Prey Lang Wildlife Sanctuary landscape.

== History ==
Conservation International began work in Cambodia in 2001, implementing the Central Cardamom Protected Forest project with the Forestry Administration from July 2001 to September 2004.

Following the 2001–2004 project period, the CI continued post-project activities in the Central Cardamom Protected Forest, including expanding technical analysis and community involvement through conservation agreements, and a new agreement with the Forestry Administration signed in October 2006. By the early 2010s, its Central Cardamom Mountains programme combined forest and biodiversity protection, land-use planning, and rural livelihood activities, operating primarily in the Cardamom Mountains portions of Pursat Province and Koh Kong Province.

In 2018, the Northern Prey Lang landscape became operational as a REDD+ project jointly implemented by Conservation International, the Ministry of Environment, and Mitsui.

== Programmes and operations ==
Selected programme locations in Cambodia (1 Phnom Penh, 2 Thma Bang (Koh Kong Province), 3 Central Cardamom Mountains National Park, 4 Tonlé Sap, 5 Prey Lang Wildlife Sanctuary, and 6 Veun Sai-Siem Pang National Park)

The programme is based in Phnom Penh and maintains a field office in Thma Bang, Koh Kong Province.

=== Cardamom Mountains ===
CI Cambodia's work in the Cardamom Mountains has included protected-area and community-linked conservation activities in the Central Cardamom landscape, including work associated with the Central Cardamom Protected Forest project (2001–2004) and subsequent programmes focused on forest and biodiversity protection, land-use planning, and rural livelihood activities in the Cardamom Mountains portions of Pursat Province and Koh Kong Province. A case study from the Central Cardamom Protected Forest described the use of payment for ecosystem services approaches to forest and biodiversity protection.

=== Tonlé Sap ===
Freshwater work linked to Tonlé Sap has included activities associated with habitat protection and community-based management in the lake's floodplain, alongside flooded-forest restoration described in reporting about the programme's activities. A Cambodia Climate Change Alliance practice note described Conservation International introducing an integrated climate-change resilience and floodplain management project with communities living on the lake, including work with a community fisheries area and the Kampong Preak fish sanctuary. In 2024, Conservation International Cambodia reported restoration of about 600 hectares (6 km^{2}) of flooded forest and the planting of more than 270,000 seedlings since 2010, with a stated target of restoring more than 2,660 hectares (26.6 km^{2}) by 2030. A Tonlé Sap conservation project supported work in areas including the Kampong Prak sanctuary zone, covering more than 50,000 hectares (500 km^{2}) of freshwater habitat including seasonally flooded forests and dry-season ponds, with activities including ranger patrol support and establishment of fish sanctuaries and conservation zones. A study of the Kampong Preak fish sanctuary reported links between the sanctuary and livelihoods in nearby floating villages.

=== Prey Lang ===
CI Cambodia's work in the Prey Lang Wildlife Sanctuary landscape has included forest conservation and conservation finance initiatives associated with the Northern Prey Lang landscape REDD+ project, implemented with the Ministry of Environment and Mitsui & Co. and operational since 2018. A USAID case study on REDD+ in Cambodia described support to Conservation International for community consultations and patrol capacity-building in Prey Lang as part of developing the project. Conservation International Cambodia is a coordinator of the project, alongside government and private-sector participants. A project completion report for a JICA natural-resources management programme noted that the sanctuary is covered by a JCM-REDD+ project and that other field activities in the area were adjusted to avoid overlap that could affect carbon credits.

=== Veun Sai-Siem Pang ===
CI Cambodia has worked in Veun Sai-Siem Pang National Park on a community-based ecotourism project implemented in collaboration with the TUI Care Foundation and the IUCN through the IUCN Save Our Species programme. Through the project, CI Cambodia supports protected-area management (including ranger patrol capacity) and activities intended to support community livelihoods linked to ecotourism, such as training for local tourism and tour-guiding. Veun Sai-Siem Pang has also been the subject of ecological research, including studies of the endangered northern yellow-cheeked crested gibbon (Nomascus annamensis) in selectively logged forests within the park.

Programme landscapes of Conservation International Cambodia
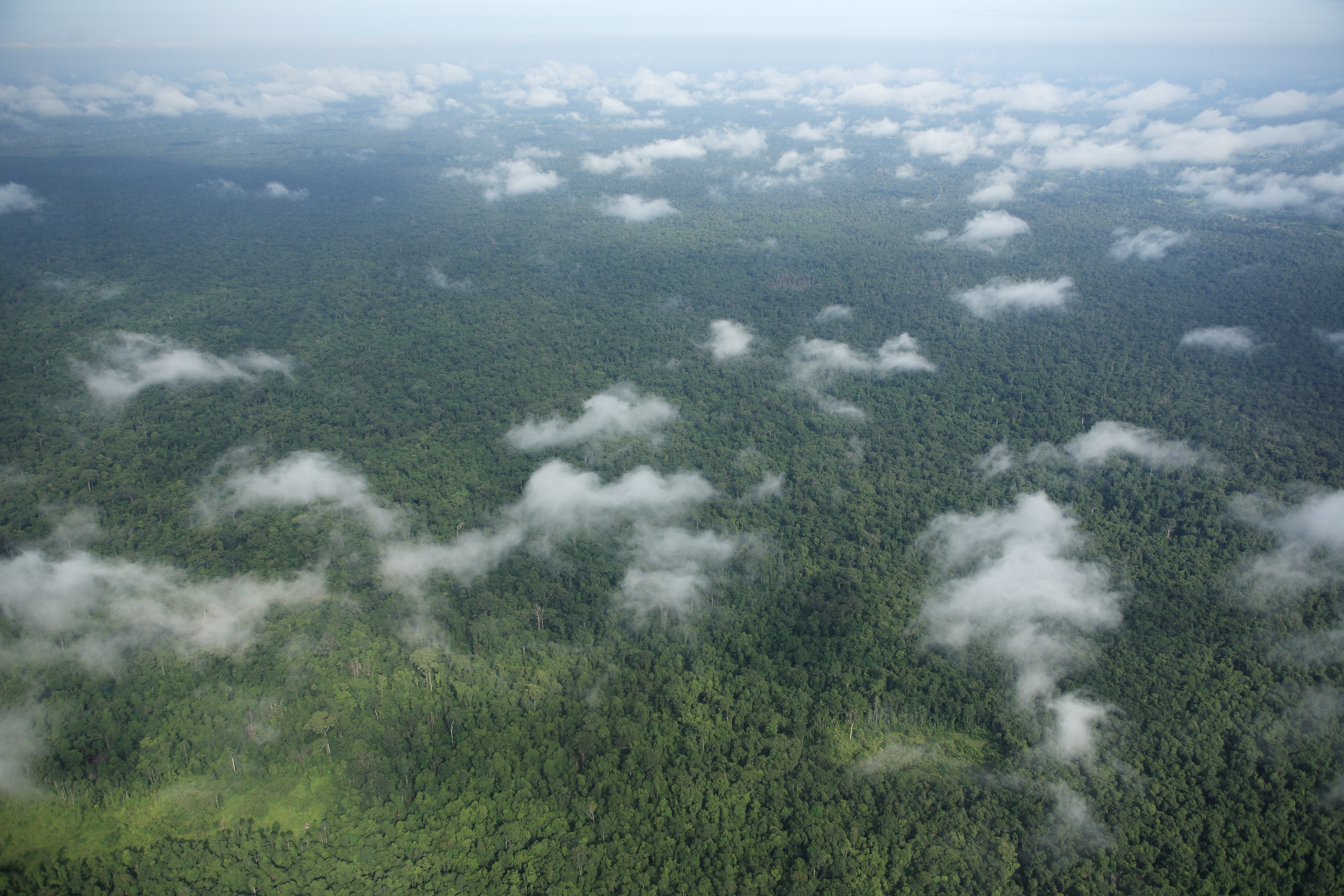
Prey Lang Wildlife Sanctuary

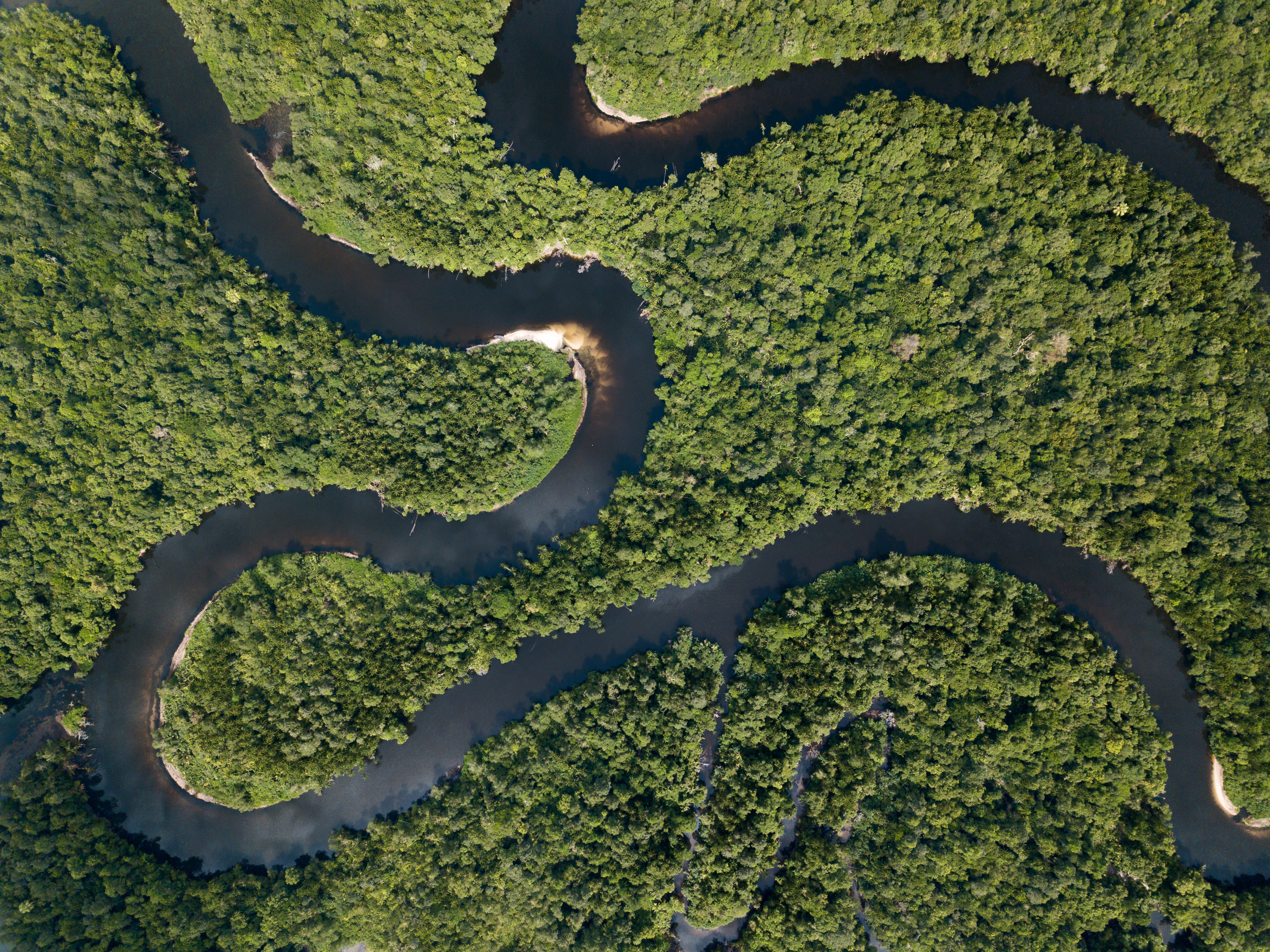
Cardamom Mountains

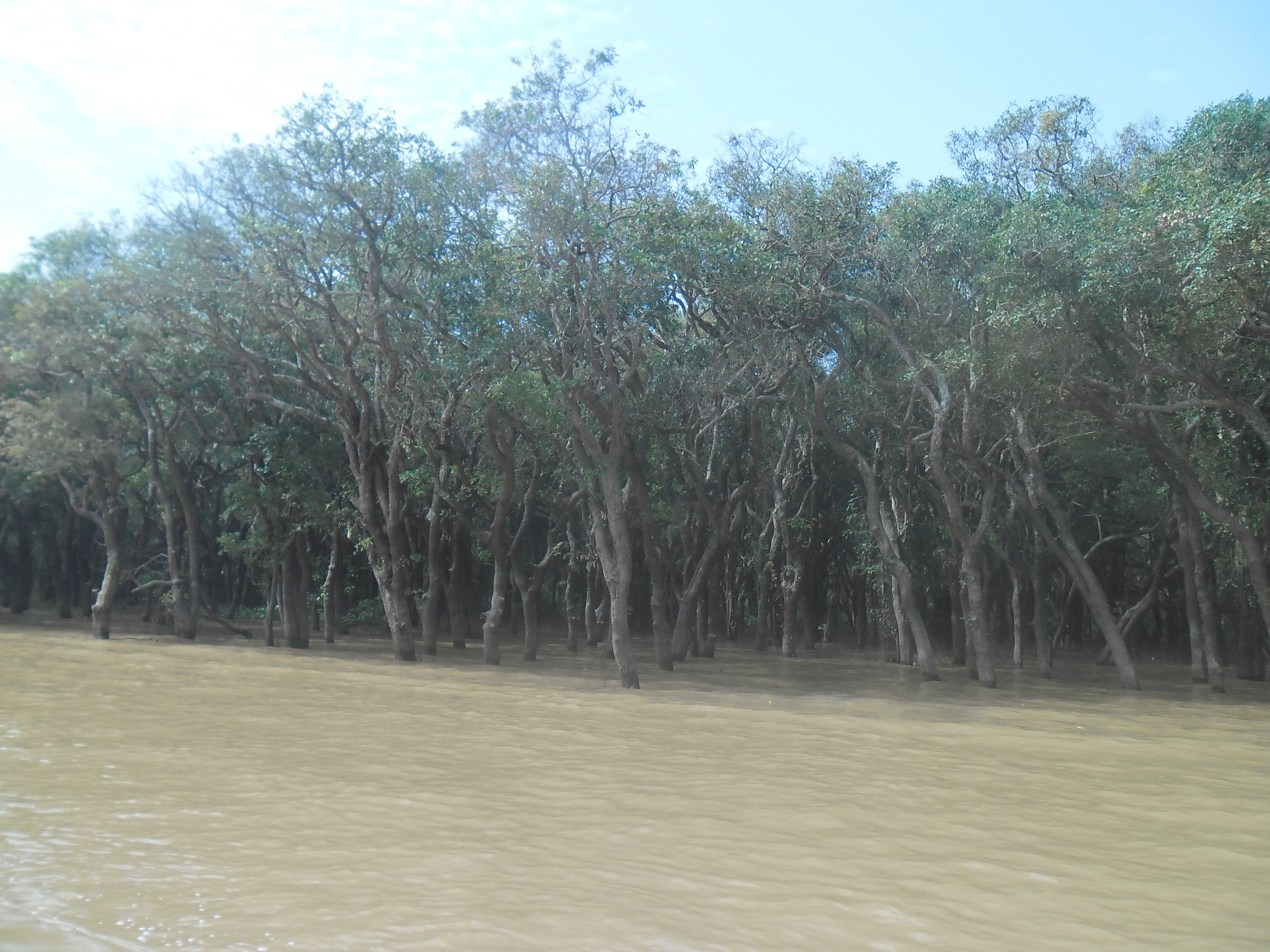
Tonlé Sap

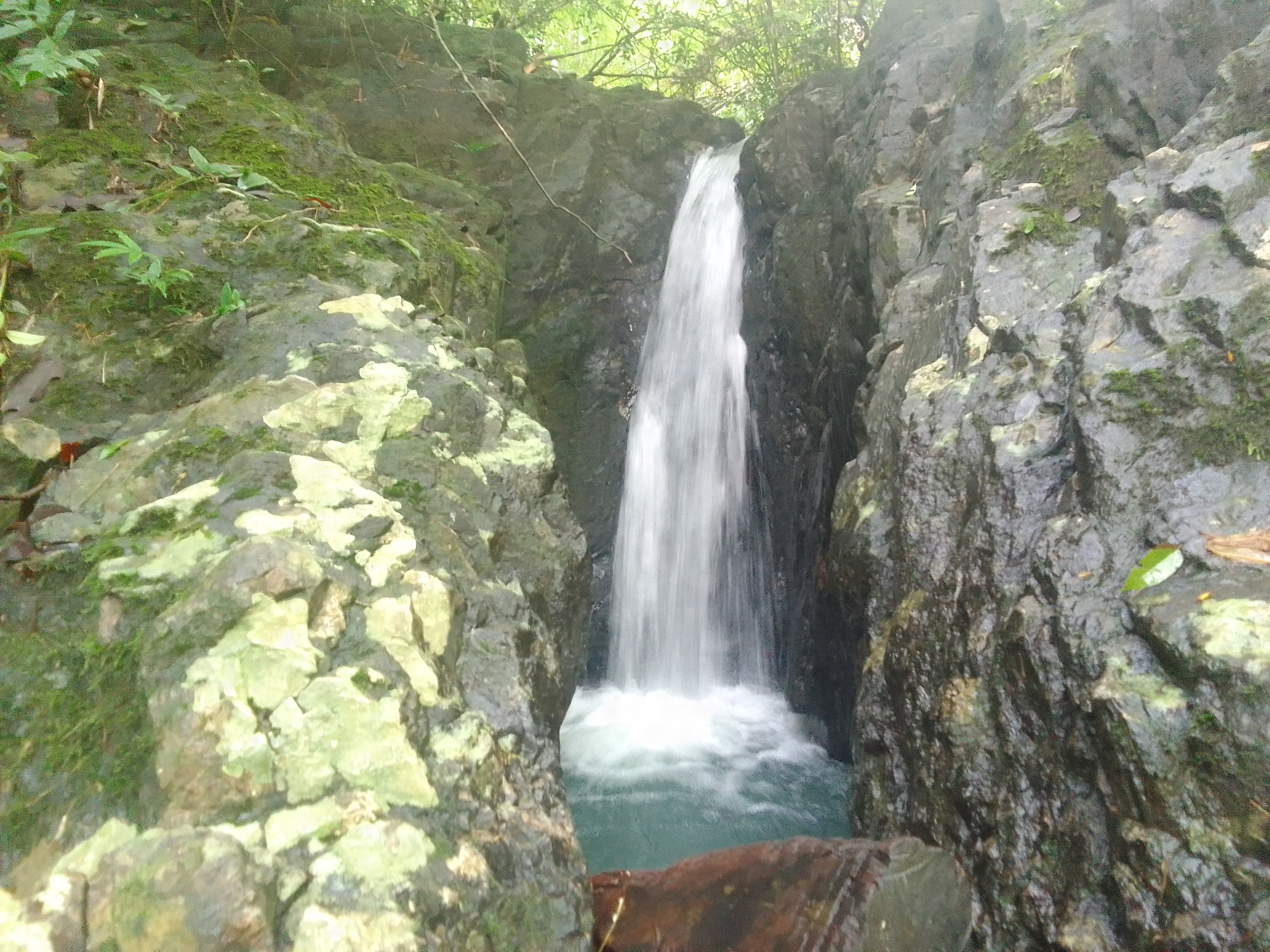
Veun Sai-Siem Pang

== Partnerships ==
CI Cambodia's programmes have involved partnerships with Cambodian government agencies and private-sector and non-governmental organisations. In the Cardamom Mountains, it implemented the Central Cardamom Protected Forest project with Cambodia's Forestry Administration from 2001 to 2004, and a JICA natural environment survey referred to the Cardamoms Conservation Programme as a partnership between Conservation International and the Forestry Administration managing the Central Cardamom Protected Forest. In the Prey Lang landscape, CI Cambodia has worked with the Ministry of Environment and Mitsui & Co. on the Northern Prey Lang landscape REDD+ project.

Around Tonlé Sap, a Tonle Sap conservation project implemented by Conservation International listed implementing partners including the Ministry of Agriculture, Forestry & Fisheries, the Cambodian Fisheries Administration, and local communities. In Veun Sai-Siem Pang National Park, CI Cambodia has collaborated with the TUI Care Foundation and IUCN through the IUCN Save Our Species programme on a community-based ecotourism project.

== Funding and conservation finance ==
The Central Cardamom Protected Forest project was funded by the United Nations Foundation and Conservation International. CI Cambodia's programmes in the Central Cardamom Protected Forest used conservation agreements framed as payment-for-environmental-services approaches for forest and biodiversity conservation. A trust fund for management financing of Central Cardamom Mountains National Park was initiated in 2016.

CI Cambodia has also participated in a REDD+ project in the Prey Lang landscape that is registered under Japan's Joint Crediting Mechanism (JCM). Project participants include the Ministry of Environment and Mitsui & Co., with a project operation start date of 12 March 2018 and a JCM registration date of 9 June 2023. The project is jointly implemented by Conservation International, the Ministry of Environment and Mitsui & Co. Under the mechanism, 612 525 credits were issued for the project in December 2023.

== Impact and evaluation ==
A final evaluation commissioned by the United Nations Development Programme (UNDP) assessed the Cardamom Mountains Protected Forest and Wildlife Sanctuaries Project and concluded that it had substantially achieved its planned outcomes and made a significant contribution to sanctuary management, while reporting only marginal progress in reducing broader conservation threats such as settlement expansion and illegal natural-resource extraction. The evaluation identified institutional and law-enforcement challenges and recommended strengthening coordination and developing a coordinated law-enforcement strategy for the Cardamom Mountains protected areas.

A UNDP mid-term review of the Sustainable Forest Management Project Cambodia rated overall progress as moderately satisfactory and reported that outcomes were likely to be achieved with additional time, while identifying governance complexity and institutional arrangements as key risks to success. The review described the project design as consistent with sustainable forest management practice but identified weaknesses in the results framework and recommended revising indicators and strengthening coordination arrangements among institutions involved in forest and protected-area management.
