= Joint Crediting Mechanism =

Bilateral financing by Japanese government

Joint Crediting Mechanism (JCM) is a bilateral initiative launched by the Government of Japan in 2013 to facilitate greenhouse gas emission reductions in collaboration with partner countries. It aims to promote the dissemination of advanced low-carbon technologies in developing countries, quantify the resulting emission reductions, and allow Japan to use part of the reductions to meet its emission targets for 2020 and 2030.

Unlike the Clean Development Mechanism under the Kyoto Protocol, JCM allows developing countries to act as joint implementers rather than just hosts. As of June 2016, Japan had established partnerships with 16 countries, including Indonesia, Vietnam, and Ethiopia. Each JCM partnership is governed by a Joint Committee (JC) composed of representatives from both countries, responsible for approving methodologies and issuing credits based on emission reductions below a defined business-as-usual (BAU) level. These credits are not tradable internationally but may be counted towards Japan’s national targets under the Paris Agreement.

== Financial Structure ==
JCM operates through various financial schemes supported by the Ministry of the Environment (MOE) and the Ministry of Economy, Trade and Industry (METI), Japan.

JCM Model Projects: Launched by MOE in 2013, this scheme subsidizes up to 50% of initial costs using revenue from Japan’s Global Warming Tax.

JCM REDD+ Model Projects: Focus on forest conservation, illegal logging prevention, and community-based climate mitigation activities.

Collaborative Financing Program: Targets broader implementation of advanced low-carbon technologies in partnership with agencies like JICA.

Japan Fund for the Joint Crediting Mechanism (JFJCM): Managed by the Asian Development Bank, this trust fund supports JCM-integrated ADB projects across eligible countries.

JCM Demonstration Projects: Implemented by NEDO, focusing on verifying emission reductions through MRV (Measurement, Reporting, and Verification).

== Implementation ==
Between 2010 and 2016, over 540 feasibility studies and projects were initiated under JCM, mainly in Asia. About 80% were feasibility studies focused on project identification, with energy efficiency, renewable energy, and energy technology being the dominant sectors. Indonesia, Vietnam, and Thailand were the top participating countries.

The JCM has been especially active in East Asia, where financial alignment with ADB operations facilitates project funding. While most projects target GHG mitigation, there is increasing emphasis on adaptation initiatives like REDD+ and waste management, particularly in small island and vulnerable states in the Pacific. A Cambodian forestry project under the mechanism includes the Northern Prey Lang landscape REDD+ project (operational from 2018), jointly implemented by Conservation International’s Cambodia programme, Cambodia’s Ministry of Environment and Mitsui.
