= Sambour district =

Sambour សំបូរ
- District (srok)
- Interactive map of Sambour
- Country: Cambodia
- Province: Kratié
- Communes: 10
- Villages: 52

Population (1998)
  - Total: 41,732
- Time zone: +7
- Geocode: 1004

Sambour is a district located in Kratié province, in Cambodia.

Sambour
Khum (commune)	Phum (villages)
Boeng Char	Damrae, Kampong Roteh, Kaoh Dambang
Kampong Cham	a Chen, Ampil Tuek, Kampong Krabei, Kaoh Phdau, Samphin, Tonsaong Thleak, Yeav
Kbal Damrei	Changhab, Ou Pou, Ou Ta Noeng, Srae Sbov, Srae Traeng
Kaoh Khnhaer	Bay Samnom, Cheung Peat, Kampong Pnov, Kaoh Chbar, Svay Chek
Ou Krieng	Koh Khnhaer, Khsach Leav, Srae Sangkae, Ou Krieng, Ou Preah, Pon Ta Chea
Roluos Mean Chey	Pakleae, Srae Roluos, Srae Chhuk, Srae Toung
Sambour	Char Thnaol, Doun Meas, Kaeng Prasat, Kaoh Real, Kaoh Sam, Sambour, Samraong, Srae Khoean
Sandan	Thmei, Thum, Sandan, Sangkom
Srae Chis	Ampok, Koun Va, Phnum Pir, Rovieng, Srae Chis, Srae Tnaot
Voadthonak	Anlong Preah Kou, Preaek Krieng, Vodthonak, Ta Nguon
