= List of protected areas of Cambodia =

This is a list of protected areas of Cambodia.

A total of 8 forms of protected areas are recognized under the Cambodian Protected Area Law of 2008. These are:

1. National Park
2. Wildlife sanctuary
3. Protected landscape
4. Multiple use area
5. Ramsar site
6. Biosphere reserve
7. Natural heritage site
8. Marine park

== National Parks ==
- Botum Sakor National Park
- Central Cardamom Mountains National Park
- Kep National Park
- Kirirom National Park
- Koh Rong National Park
- O'Yadav National Park
- Phnom Kulen National Park
- Preah Monivong National Park
- Ream National Park
- Southern Cardamom National Park
- Veun Sai-Siem Pang National Park
- Virachey National Park

== Wildlife sanctuaries ==
- Beng Per Wildlife Sanctuary
- Chhaeb Wildlife Sanctuary
- Keo Seima Wildlife Sanctuary
- Kulen Promtep Wildlife Sanctuary
- Lomphat Wildlife Sanctuary
- Peam Krasop Wildlife Sanctuary
- Phnom Aural Wildlife Sanctuary
- Phnom Nam Lyr Wildlife Sanctuary
- Phnom Prich Wildlife Sanctuary
- Phnom Sankos Wildlife Sanctuary
- Phnom Thnout-Phnom Pok Wildlife Sanctuary
- Preah Roka Wildlife Sanctuary
- Prek Prasab Wildlife Sanctuary
- Prey Lang Wildlife Sanctuary
- Roneam Daun Sam Wildlife Sanctuary
- Sambor Wildlife Sanctuary
- Sanka Rokhavan Wildlife Sanctuary
- Siem Pang Wildlife Sanctuary
- Sre Pok Wildlife Sanctuary
- Stung Sen Wildlife Sanctuary
- Tatai Wildlife Sanctuary

== Protected Landscapes ==
- An Long Pring Protected Landscape
- Ang Trapeng Thmor Protected Landscape
- Angkor Protected Landscape
- Banteay Chhmar Protected Landscape
- Boeng Lomkod Protected Landscape
- Boeng Prektub Protected Landscape
- Boeung Prek Lpov Protected Landscape
- Kulen Elephant Forest
- North Tonle Sap Protected Landscape
- Phnom Krang Dey Meas Protected Landscape
- Prasat Bakan (Kampong Svay) Protected Landscape
- Preah Vihear Protected Landscape
- Roneam Daun Sam Protected Landscape
- Sambor Prey Kok Temple Protected Landscape
- Yak Oum-Yakara Protected Landscape

== Multiple Use Areas ==
- Boeng Chhmar Multiple Use Area
- Boeng Yeak Laom Multiple Use Area
- Dong Peng Multiple Use Area
- Kbal Chay Multiple Use Area
- Phnom Neang Kong Rey Multiple Use Area
- Prek Toal Multiple Use Area
- Punchearkrek Multiple Use Area
- Samlaut Multiple Use Area
- Sorsor Sdam Sat Tor Multiple Use Area
- Stung Sen Multiple Use Area
- Tonle Sap Multiple Use Area

== Natural Heritage Sites ==
- Phnom Tbeng Natural Heritage Park
- Phnom Yat Natural Heritage Park
- Phnom Pram Pi Natural Heritage Park
- Phnom Kiriyung Natural Heritage Park
- Phnom Taik Traing Natural Heritage Park
- Phnom Bak Natural Heritage Park
- Phnom Chhnang Natural Heritage Park
- Phnom Preah Net Preah Natural Heritage Park
- Phnom Preah-Phnom Veng Natural Heritage Park
- Phnom Yeay Sam Natural Heritage Park
- Phnom Svay Natural Heritage Park

== Other protected areas ==
- Boeng Tonle Chhmar
- Koh Kae Protected Resort
- Stung Treng Ramsar
- Techo Sen Russey Treb Cambodian Royal Academy Park
- Tonlé Sap Biosphere Reserve

== Degazetted protected areas ==
- Snoul Wildlife Sanctuary

== See also ==
- List of World Heritage Sites in Cambodia
