= Chhaeb-Preah Roka Wildlife Sanctuary =

Wildlife sanctuary in northern Cambodia

- Khmer: ដែនជម្រកសត្វព្រៃឆែប-ព្រះរកា
- Location within Cambodia
- Location: Preah Vihear and Stung Treng provinces, Cambodia
- Coordinates: 14.08°N 105.15°E
- Area: 3,475.68 km^{2} (1,341.97 sq mi)
- Established: 17 July 2023
- Governing body: Ministry of Environment

Chhaeb-Preah Roka Wildlife Sanctuary (Khmer: ដែនជម្រកសត្វព្រៃឆែប-ព្រះរកា), also romanised as Chhaep-Preah Roka or Chhep-Preah Roka, is a 3,475.68 km^{2} (1,341.97 sq mi) protected area in northern Cambodia. It extends across Preah Vihear and Stung Treng provinces and forms part of the protected-area network of Cambodia's Northern Plains. The present sanctuary was established in July 2023 by merging the former Chhaeb and Preah Roka wildlife sanctuaries and incorporating additional land into the protected area.

The sanctuary contains extensive deciduous dipterocarp forest, together with semi-evergreen and evergreen forest, seasonally inundated grasslands and numerous seasonal forest pools. These habitats support threatened birds and mammals including the giant ibis, white-shouldered ibis, sarus crane, Asian elephant, banteng, gaur and Eld's deer.

== History ==
=== Preah Vihear Protected Forest and Chhaeb Wildlife Sanctuary ===
Part of the present sanctuary was first protected on 30 July 2002, when Sub-Decree No. 76 established a protected forest in Preah Vihear Province for the conservation of plant and wildlife genetic resources. The area became known as the Preah Vihear Protected Forest.

Following the transfer of a number of protected forests from the Ministry of Agriculture, Forestry and Fisheries to the Ministry of Environment, Sub-Decree No. 79 reclassified the area as Chhaeb Wildlife Sanctuary on 9 May 2016. The sanctuary covered 190,027 hectares in Preah Vihear and Stung Treng provinces.

=== Preah Roka Wildlife Sanctuary ===
Preah Roka Wildlife Sanctuary, also known as Prey Preah Roka Wildlife Sanctuary, was established by Sub-Decree No. 75 on 9 May 2016. It covered 90,361 hectares in Preah Vihear Province. The sanctuary formed a wildlife corridor between Chhaeb Wildlife Sanctuary and Kulen Promtep Wildlife Sanctuary. Surveys reported a mosaic of habitats supporting at least 28 threatened species, including giant ibis, white-shouldered ibis, Eld's deer and banteng.

=== Merger ===
On 17 July 2023, the Cambodian government issued Sub-Decree No. 174 establishing the combined Chhaeb-Preah Roka Wildlife Sanctuary. Its new boundary covered 347,568 hectares in Preah Vihear and Stung Treng provinces, making it substantially larger than the two preceding sanctuaries combined. The enlargement formed part of a wider series of 2023 sub-decrees that incorporated land previously classified as biodiversity conservation corridors into Cambodia's protected-area system.

== Ecology and biodiversity ==
The sanctuary lies within one of the largest remaining expanses of deciduous dipterocarp forest in mainland Southeast Asia. The former Chhaeb portion was estimated to comprise approximately 67 per cent deciduous dipterocarp forest, with smaller areas of semi-evergreen forest, open grassland and seasonal pools known locally as trapeangs. The wider landscape also contains evergreen forest along watercourses and on more fertile soils, as well as seasonally inundated grasslands and wetlands.

A camera-trap survey conducted in the former Chhaeb Wildlife Sanctuary during the 2012–2013 and 2013–2014 dry seasons recorded 30 species of large mammal over 7,483 camera-trap nights. Recorded species included Eld's deer, banteng, jungle cat and the endangered large-spotted civet, which was the fourth-most frequently photographed species in the survey. A subsequent 2017 survey confirmed the continued presence of Eld's deer, although detections were relatively infrequent. Deer used seasonal pools more intensively where water levels were higher and surrounding trees were larger, while human and domestic or feral pig activity were negatively associated with their use of a site.

A genetic study of Asian elephants published in 2025 estimated that the population occupying the former Chhaeb and Preah Roka sanctuaries numbered approximately 20 individuals, with a 95 per cent confidence interval of 13–22. Six individual elephants were detected in both former sanctuaries, demonstrating movement between the two areas.

The sanctuary is particularly important for large waterbirds. Giant ibis and white-shouldered ibis depend on deciduous dipterocarp forest, wetlands and seasonal pools for feeding and breeding. A study using giant ibis nest records from Chhaeb, Preah Roka and Kulen Promtep found a decline in seasonal surface-water availability between 2000–2004 and 2016–2020, with an estimated 25 per cent reduction in suitable dry-season giant ibis habitat across the study area.

== Communities and management ==
The sanctuary is administered by the Ministry of Environment. The Wildlife Conservation Society has provided technical and financial support for conservation work in the Northern Plains, including biodiversity monitoring, law enforcement, land-use planning, community protected areas, ecotourism and wildlife-friendly agriculture.

The forest is culturally and economically important to the Indigenous Kuy people. Communities use the forest for resin tapping and the collection of mushrooms, fruit, medicinal plants and other non-timber forest products. Mature dipterocarp resin trees may be inherited between generations and have both livelihood and spiritual significance.

Between 2020 and 2022, a participatory resource-mapping and zonation process was undertaken across the former Chhaeb and Preah Roka sanctuaries. It involved 84 meetings in 48 villages and 3,064 participants. Community land, agricultural areas, cultural and sacred sites, non-timber forest-product areas and wildlife habitat were mapped to inform proposed core, conservation, sustainable-use and community zones.

Conservation initiatives in the wider Northern Plains include community ecotourism, wildlife-friendly rice production and direct payments for protecting the nests of threatened birds. The Bird Nest Protection Program employs local people to report and guard nests until chicks fledge. An evaluation found that the programme improved nest success and contributed to increases in at least three bird populations.

== Threats ==
The sanctuary is threatened by illegal logging, hunting, agricultural expansion, land clearance and commercial pressures including mineral exploitation. Illegal logging has been particularly well documented in the former Preah Roka sanctuary, where the loss of resin trees has affected Kuy livelihoods.

In 2021, the Cambodian Youth Network reported 213 instances of suspected illegal logging recorded during two surveys of Preah Roka. The Ministry of Environment disputed the findings, stating that some of the recorded timber was old or came from resin trees legally approved for use. Investigations published following the 2023 merger continued to report extensive logging within the sanctuary, as well as restrictions and legal pressure affecting community forest patrols.

== See also ==
- Deforestation in Cambodia
- List of protected areas of Cambodia
