= List of Intangible Cultural Heritage elements in Cambodia =

The United Nations Educational, Scientific and Cultural Organisation (UNESCO) intangible cultural heritage elements are the non-physical traditions and practices performed by a people. As part of a country's cultural heritage, they include celebrations, festivals, performances, oral traditions, music, and the making of handicrafts. The "intangible cultural heritage" is defined by the Convention for the Safeguarding of Intangible Cultural Heritage, drafted in 2003 and took effect in 2006. Inscription of new heritage elements on the UNESCO Intangible Cultural Heritage Lists is determined by the Intergovernmental Committee for the Safeguarding of Intangible Cultural Heritage, an organisation established by the convention.

To date, there are 7 intangible cultural heritages of Cambodia have been inscribed on the list. Five elements are on the Representative List of Intangible Cultural Heritage of Humanity, and two elements are on the List of Intangible Cultural Heritage in Need of Urgent Safeguarding.

== Intangible Cultural Heritage of Humanity ==
+ Transnational element

=== Representative List ===
Name	Image	Year proclaimed	Year inscribed	No.	Description
Royal ballet of Cambodia		2003	2008	00060	Royal Ballet of Cambodia, aka Khmer Classical Dance, is a form of performing arts that has been associated with the Khmer royal court for more than a thousand years. Khmer classical dance renowned for its graceful hand gestures and stunning costumes. Performances would traditionally accompany royal ceremonies and observances such as coronations, marriages, funerals or Khmer holidays. There have four main types of roles in the Khmer classical dance: Neay Rong (the male), Neang (the female), Yeak (the giant), and the Sva (the monkey). The dance is accompanied by the traditional Pinpeat orchestra.
Sbek Thom, Khmer shadow theatre	Cambodian Sbek Thom at Orient Museum, Lisbon, Portugal	2005	2008	00108	Sbek Thom is a Khmer shadow theatre that featuring 2 meters high. The theatre is believed to date back since before the Angkorian period. The performances could only take place on specific occasions three or four times a year, such as the Khmer New Year, the King’s birthday or the veneration of famous people. The Sbek Thom performances is accompanied by the Pinpeat orchestra, and usually perform the epic of Reamker, Khmer version of Indian Ramayana.
Tugging rituals and games	Churning of the Ocean of Milk at Angkor Wat		2015	01080	Known in Khmer language as L'beng Teanh Prot, which is linked to Khmer tradition and culture and historically valuable evidence that can be seen through the carvings on the walls of many temples which tell of the Hindu myth “Churning of the Sea of Milk”. It is commonly played during Khmer New Year or Chlong Chet, a rice-related ceremony.
Kun Lbokator, traditional martial arts in Cambodia	Kun L'bokator martial arts in 1920s		2022	01868	Kun Lbokator is an ancient Khmer martial arts dating back to at least the Angkorian period, which aims to inculcate and develop mental and physical strength and discipline in its practitioners, by mastering self-defense techniques, while promoting the philosophy of non-violence.
Cultural practices and expressions linked to Krama, a traditional woven textile in Cambodia	Woman wearing krama as a headdress		2024	02115	Krama is a woven textile associated with traditional practices and cultural expressions of the daily life in Cambodia. A rectangular cloth made of either cotton or silk, krama features a variety of grid-pattern motifs. The white, yellow, red and blue dyes used are extracted from natural vegetation and insects, and the cloth is woven manually using a traditional handloom.

=== Intangible Cultural Heritage in Need of Urgent Safeguarding List ===
Name	Image	Year inscribed	No.	Description
Chapei dang veng	Cambodian musician playing Chapei Dang Veng in between 1860s-1870s	2016	01165	Chapei Dang Veng is a type of traditional musical instrument in Cambodian society. The long-necked lute guitar is accompanied by singing which usually about traditional poems, folk tales and Buddhist stories. The Chapei is also used in Phleng Arak, Phleng Kar Boran and Mohaori orchestras.
Lkhon Khol Wat Svay Andet	Lakhon Khol Art painting	2018	01374	Lakhon Khol is a traditional mask theatre in Cambodia. Having originated in Bhani, a type of drama, mentioned in at least 10th century inscriptions of Cambodia, Lkhon Khol today is performed by males, wearing masks and accompanied by traditional Pinpeat orchestra. It performs only episodes from Reamker, a Cambodian version of the Indian Ramayana.

== On-going Nomination ==
Element	Image	Description	Type of File	Nominate For Year
Traditional Khmer wedding	A groom clings the Sbai of a groom, which is the symbolic of Preah Thong Taong Sbai Neang Neak	Traditional Cambodian weddings, also known as Khmer wedding ceremonies, are a culturally rich affair. The wedding consists of multiple ceremonies, grand gestures and age-old Buddhist traditions, and traditionally last in three days.	Representative List	2026

== List of Possibility Items for Registration in the Near Future ==
- Traditional Khmer Wedding
- Moha sangkran Chnam Thmey, the traditional Khmer New Year in Cambodia
- Bon Om Touk, Cambodian Water and Moon Festival
- Khleng Ek, traditional Cambodian kite
- Sotr Khmer, a traditional weaving silk in Cambodia
- Khmer Silverware
- Khmer traditional clothing
- Lakhon Bassac, a traditional folk music and opera in Cambodia
- Num banhchok, a tradition rice noodles in Cambodia
- Phleng Arak, an ancient music in Cambodia
- Yike, a traditional folk music and theater in Cambodia
- Pleng Ka, Khmer traditional wedding music orchestra

== Gallery ==
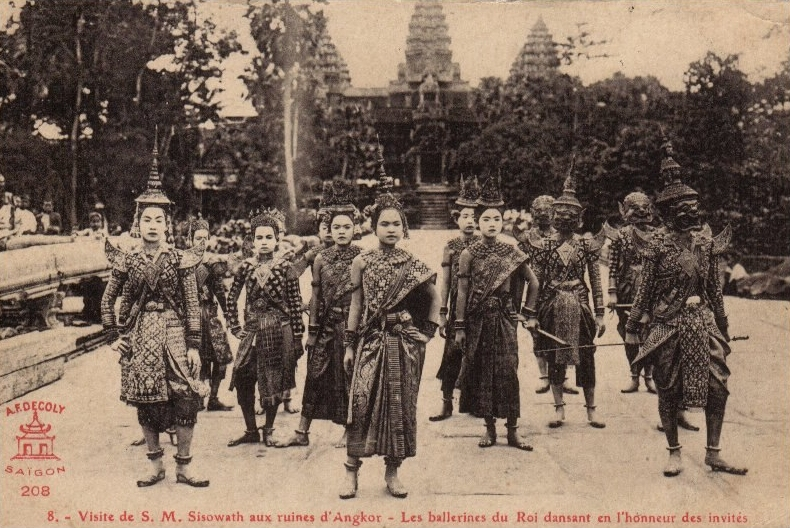
Royal Ballet dancers at Angkor Wat in 1900s

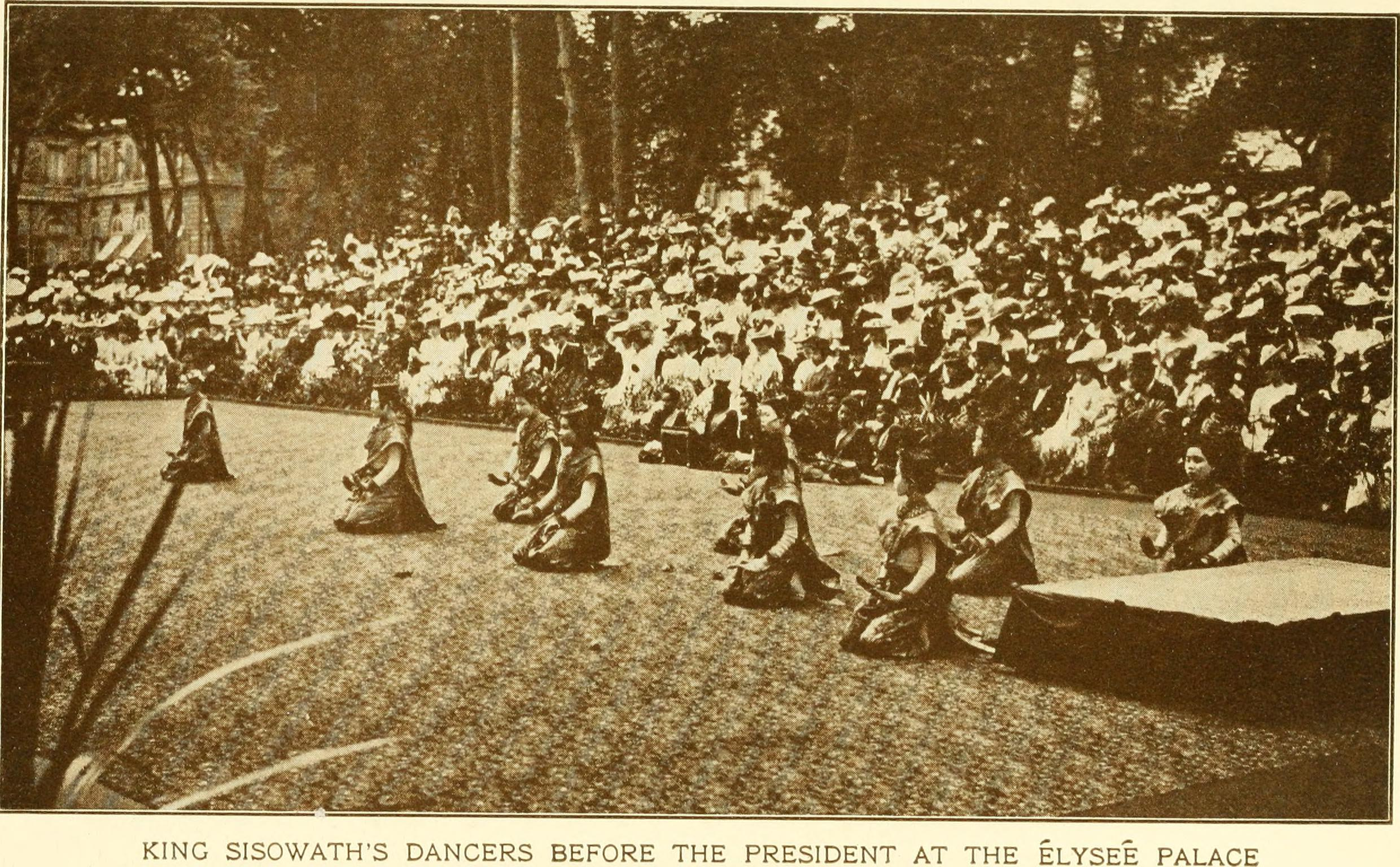
King Sisowath's dancers performed at the Élysée-Palace, Paris, France

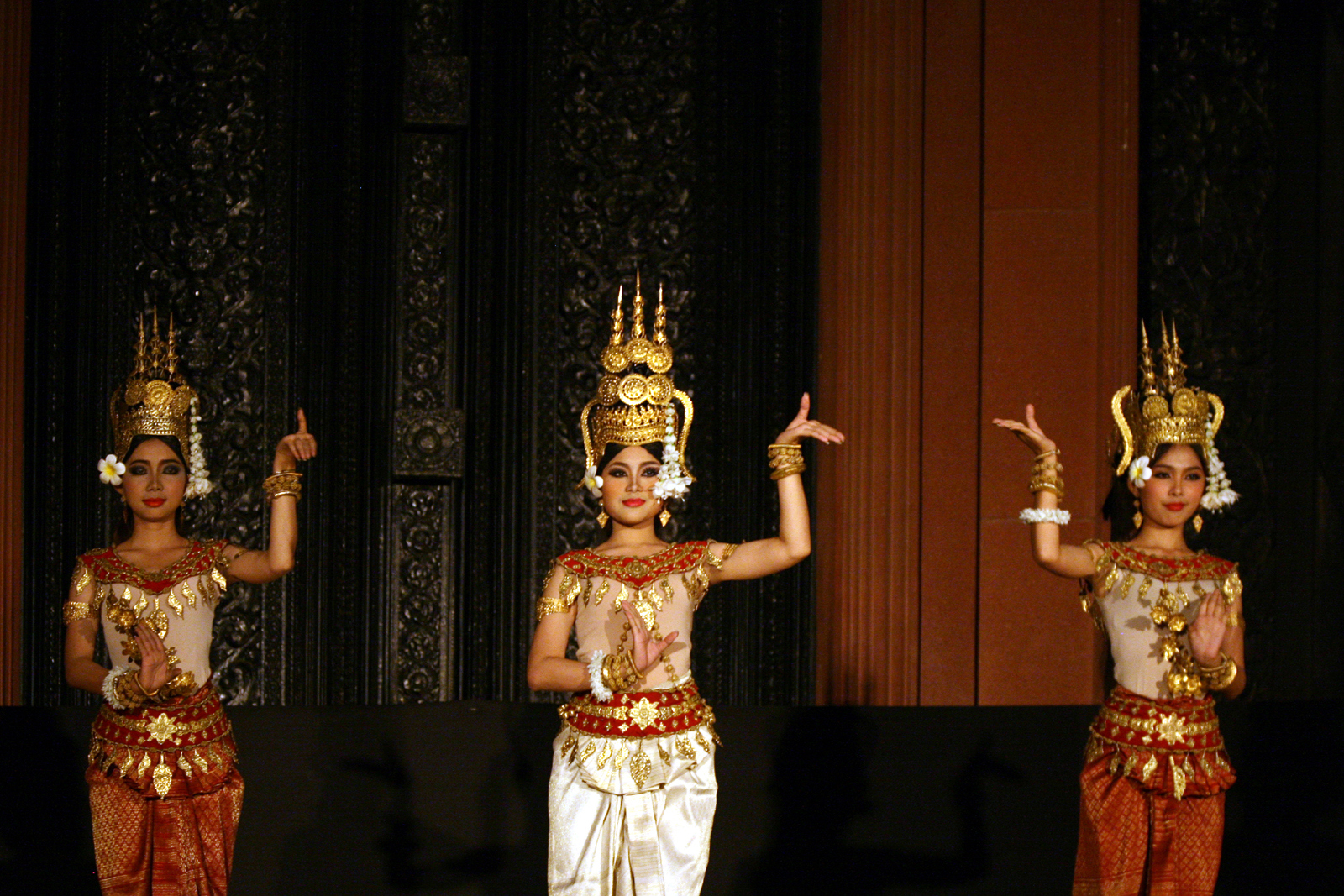
Apsara Dancer

== See also ==
- List of World Heritage Sites in Cambodia
- Royal Ballet of Cambodia
- Khmer shadow theatre
- Lakhon Khol
- Chapei dang veng
- Bokator
