= Sambor Wildlife Sanctuary =

Protected area in eastern Cambodia

- ដែនជម្រកសត្វពសំបូរ
- Location within Cambodia
- Location: Sambor district, Kratié Province, Cambodia
- Nearest city: Kratié
- Coordinates: 13°13′23″N 106°01′03″E
- Area: 500.93 km^{2} (193.41 sq mi)
- Established: 25 October 2018
- Governing body: Ministry of Environment (Cambodia)

Sambor Wildlife Sanctuary (Khmer: ដែនជម្រកសត្វពសំបូរ) is a protected area located in eastern Cambodia created in 2018, covering 50,093 hectares. Neth Pheaktra, Ministry of Environment spokesman said that the sanctuary was established to protect the ecosystems, maintain environmental equilibrium by protecting and conserving natural resources, and mitigate climate change and natural disaster risks. “Another aim is to encourage the participation of local communities and stakeholders to protect, conserve, preserve and use natural resources sustainably” he said. World Wide Fund for Nature stated this area, along with Prek Prasab Wildlife Sanctuary created in the same sub-decree, "support the most intact forests and riverine habitats in the area with the lowest human densities. A total of at least 11 large mammal species, 56 species of amphibians and reptiles, 683 species of plants, at least 15 bird species and 223 native fish species were recorded during surveys in 2006-2007."

== External ==
- Map of protected areas in Cambodia
