= Mareth (disambiguation) =

Mareth is a town in Tunisia.

Mareth may also refer to:

- Mareth, a ship also called Empire Seafoam
- Mok Mareth (born 1944), a Cambodian politician
