= Say Sam Al =

Cambodian politician

His Excellency Say Sam Al
- សាយ សំអាល់

Deputy Prime Minister of Cambodia
- Incumbent
- Assumed office 22 August 2023
- Prime Minister: Hun Manet

Minister of Land Management, Urban Planning and Construction
- Incumbent
- Assumed office 22 August 2023
- Prime Minister: Hun Manet
- Preceded by: Chea Sophara

Minister of Environment
- In office 24 September 2013 – 22 August 2023
- Prime Minister: Hun Sen
- Preceded by: Mok Mareth
- Succeeded by: Eang Sophalleth

Personal details
- Born: 15 May 1980 (age 46)
- Party: Cambodian People's Party
- Parent: Say Chhum (father)
- Education: Monash University
- Website: Ministry of Environment

Say Sam Al (Khmer: សាយ សំអាល់; born 15 May 1980) is a Cambodian politician serving as the Minister of Land Management since 2023 and previously the Minister of Environment from 2013 to 2023. He is the son of Say Chhum, former President of the Senate and Vice President of the Cambodian People's Party.
