= Phnom Tbeng Natural Heritage Park =

Protected area in Cambodia

- Location within Cambodia
- Location: Preah Vihear, Cambodia
- Coordinates: 13°41′52″N 104°53′46″E
- Area: 252.69 km^{2} (97.56 sq mi)
- Established: 2016
- Governing body: Ministry of Environment

Phnom Tbeng Natural Heritage Park is a protected area in Cambodia's Northern Plains Landscape, established in 2016 under Sub-decree No.189. The park was one of five sites considered for world heritage status, along with the Mekong Prek Kampi dolphin sanctuary management protected area, Phnom Nam Lear Rock in Phnom Nam Lyr Wildlife Sanctuary, the Prek Prasab Wildlife Sanctuary, and Southern Cardamom National Park. The protected area contains some of the last remaining evergreen and semi-evergreen forest habitats in northern Cambodia and is of high importance for wildlife conservation and is a key area of the upper watershed of the Steung Saen River, a tributary of the Tonlé Sap.

During 2017, a team of researchers set 24 camera traps, in order to better get to know and understand small and medium species of mammals that live in the park. They concluded that excessive deforestation and poaching significantly endanger the survival of many mammals here.

Wildlife research at PTNHP was made possible thanks to financial support from the Rainforest Trust, the Arcus Foundation, and the U.S. Fish and Wildlife Service (USFVS).

The Ministry of Environment is set to submit Phnom Tbeng Natural Heritage Park for inclusion on the UNESCO’s World Heritage List in category of Natural Site along with the Anlong Kampi Irrawaddy dolphin conservation area, in the near future.
