= Eang Sophalleth =

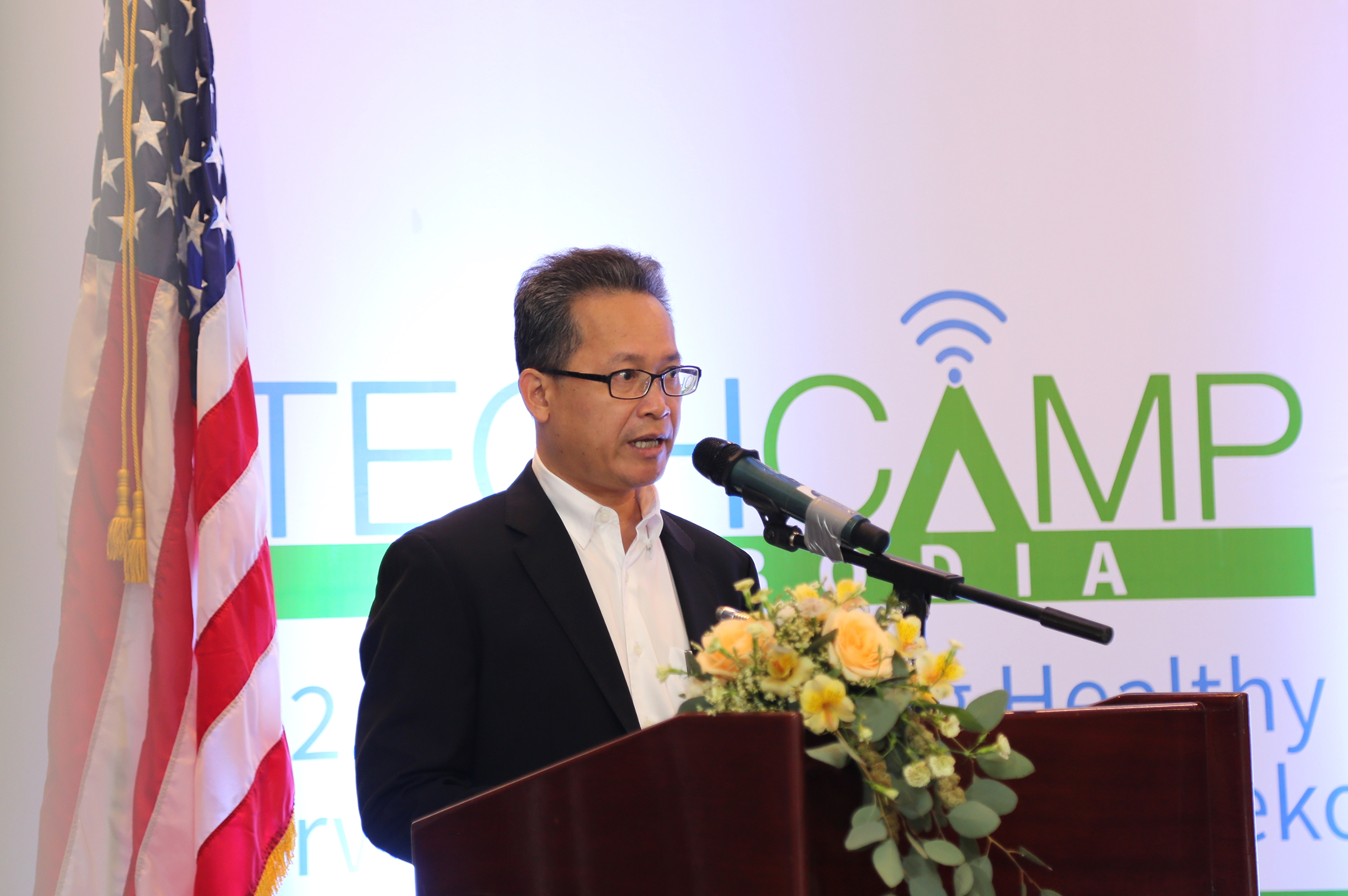

Minister of Environment
- Incumbent
- Assumed office 22 August 2023
- Prime Minister: Hun Manet
- Preceded by: Say Sam Al

Personal details
- Party: Cambodian People's Party
- Education: University of Calgary (PhD)

Eang Sophalleth is a Cambodian civil servant who became the Minister of Environment since 2023.

== Education and early career ==
Sophalleth received his PhD at the University of Calgary, Canada. In Calgary, Canada he worked for the Paragon Corporation – Sigma Measurement Inc. from 1989 to 1994. In 1994, he worked under Bettis Canada Inc. until he returned to Cambodia in 1995 and worked for the Cambodian Construction Company Ltd. until 1997.

== Government service ==
In 2011, he became Undersecretary of State in the Ministry of Public Work and Transport. He served until 2013 due to him being appointed as Undersecretary of State in the Ministry of Agriculture, Forestry and Fisheries, a position he served until 2016. In 2016, he became Undersecretary of State in the Ministry of Environment. In 2023, he was promoted as the Minister of Environment.
