= O'Yadav National Park =

National park in Cambodia

- Location within Cambodia
- Location: Ratanakiri province, Cambodia
- Coordinates: 13.44944°N 107.46750°E
- Area: 105,019 ha (1,050.19 km^{2})
- Established: 9 May 2016
- Governing body: Ministry of Environment

O'Yadav National Park is a national park in northeastern Cambodia, in Ratanakiri province. It was established in 2016, and its boundaries were revised in 2023; the park covers 105,019 ha (1,050.19 km^{2}).

== Geography and features ==
The park includes forested areas in Ratanakiri province. A temple site known as Yak Nang is located in O'Yadav National Park and was discovered in 2006.

== History ==
O'Yadav National Park was established on 9 May 2016 by Sub-decree No. 82, covering 101,348 ha (1,013.48 km^{2}) in Ratanakiri province.

In 2017, Cambodia established a national system of biodiversity conservation corridors under Sub-decree No. 07.

On 17 July 2023, Sub-decree No. 177 revised the boundaries of O'Yadav National Park, expanding it from 101,348 ha (1,013.48 km^{2}) to 105,019 ha (1,050.19 km^{2}) by incorporating an additional 3,671 ha (36.71 km^{2}) from the northeastern biodiversity conservation corridor system.
