= Phnom Thnout-Phnom Pok Wildlife Sanctuary =

Protected area in Cambodia

- ដែនជម្រកសត្វព្រៃភ្នំត្នោត-ភ្នំពក, Phnom Tnout-Phnom Pok Wildlife Sanctuary
- Location within Cambodia
- Location: Cambodia
- Nearest city: Siem Reap
- Coordinates: 13.4913°N 104.6386°E
- Area: 420.97 km^{2} (162.54 sq mi)
- Established: 31 August 2017
- Governing body: Ministry of Environment

Phnom Thnout-Phnom Pok Wildlife Sanctuary (Khmer: ដែនជម្រកសត្វព្រៃភ្នំត្នោត-ភ្នំពក) is a 42,097 ha protected area in northern Cambodia, located in Siem Reap province. The area was formally protected as a wildlife sanctuary in August 2017. The area is supported by Our Future Organization, with the conservation program developing out of the BeTreed ecotourism social enterprise first established in 2013.

More than 70 species have been recorded at the site, and the area is of particular importance for a number of endangered species including banteng, green peafowl, and pileated gibbon. The protected area is under threat from hunting (especially snaring), logging and illegal land clearance for agriculture and speculation.

== External ==
- Map of protected areas in Cambodia
