= Sihanoukville Autonomous Port =

Government agency of Cambodia

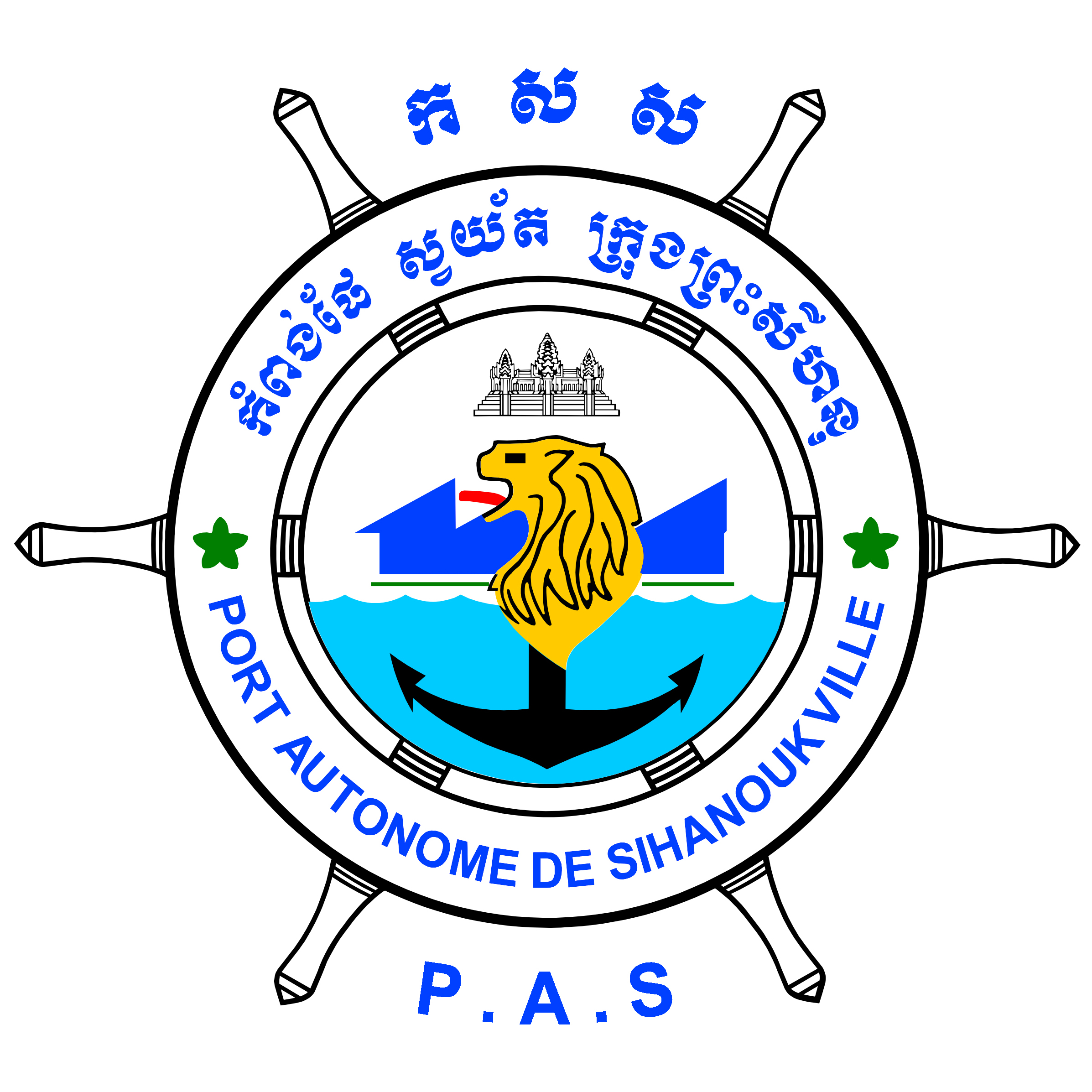
- Interactive map of Sihanoukville Autonomous Port
- Location within Cambodia
- Native name: កំពង់ផែស្វយ័តក្រុងព្រះសីហនុ Port autonome du Sihanoukville

Location
- Country: Cambodia
- Location: Bay of Kampong Som, Sihanoukville
- Coordinates: 10°38.73′N 103°29.82′E

Details
- Opened: 1960
- Operated by: Port autonome de Sihanoukville
- Owned by: Royal Government of Cambodia
- Land area: 125 ha
- No. of berths: 9
- Employees: 1000
- Chairman and CEO: Lou Kim Chhun
- UNCTAD code: KHKOS

Statistics
- Website www.pas.gov.kh

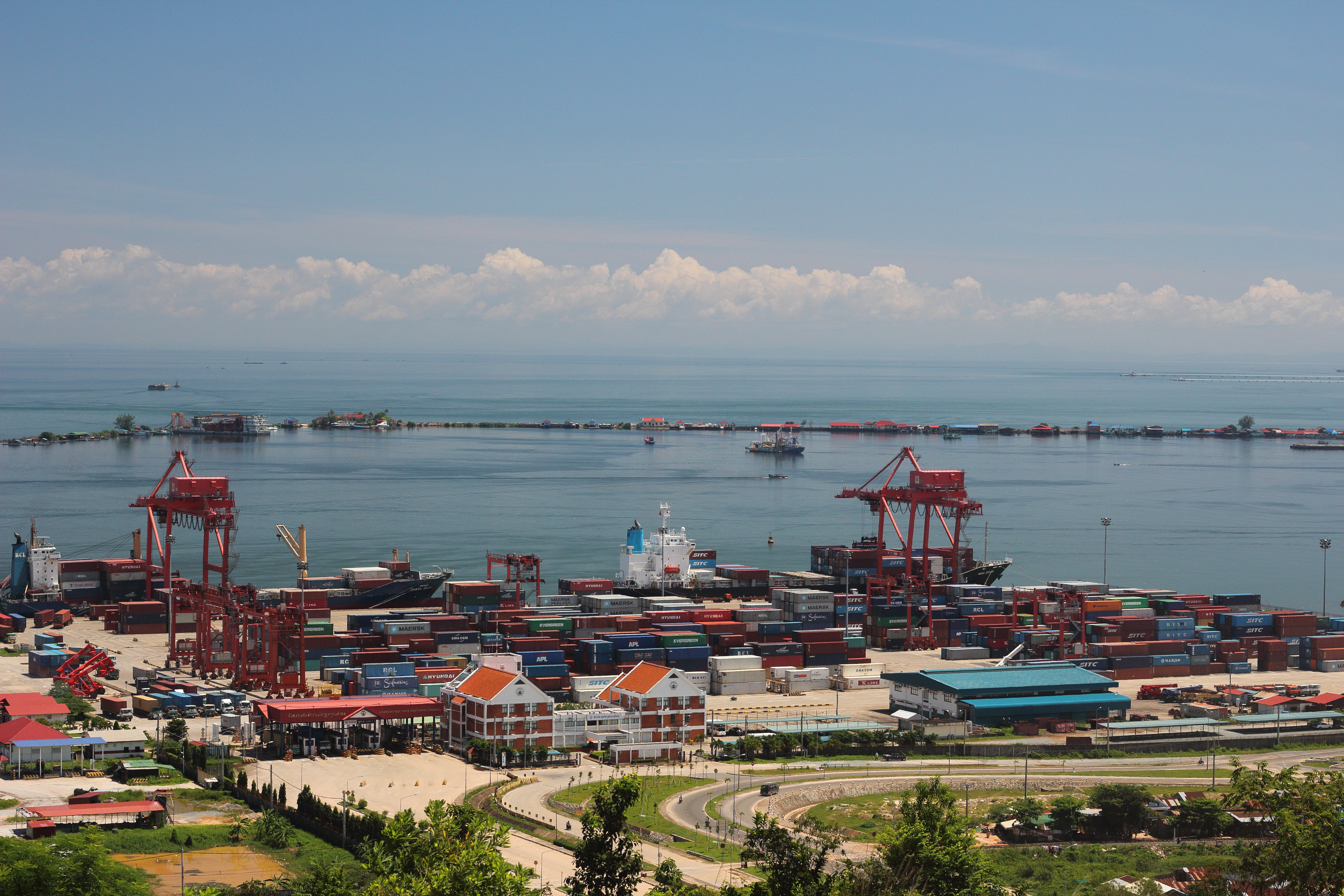
Sihanoukville Autonomous Port

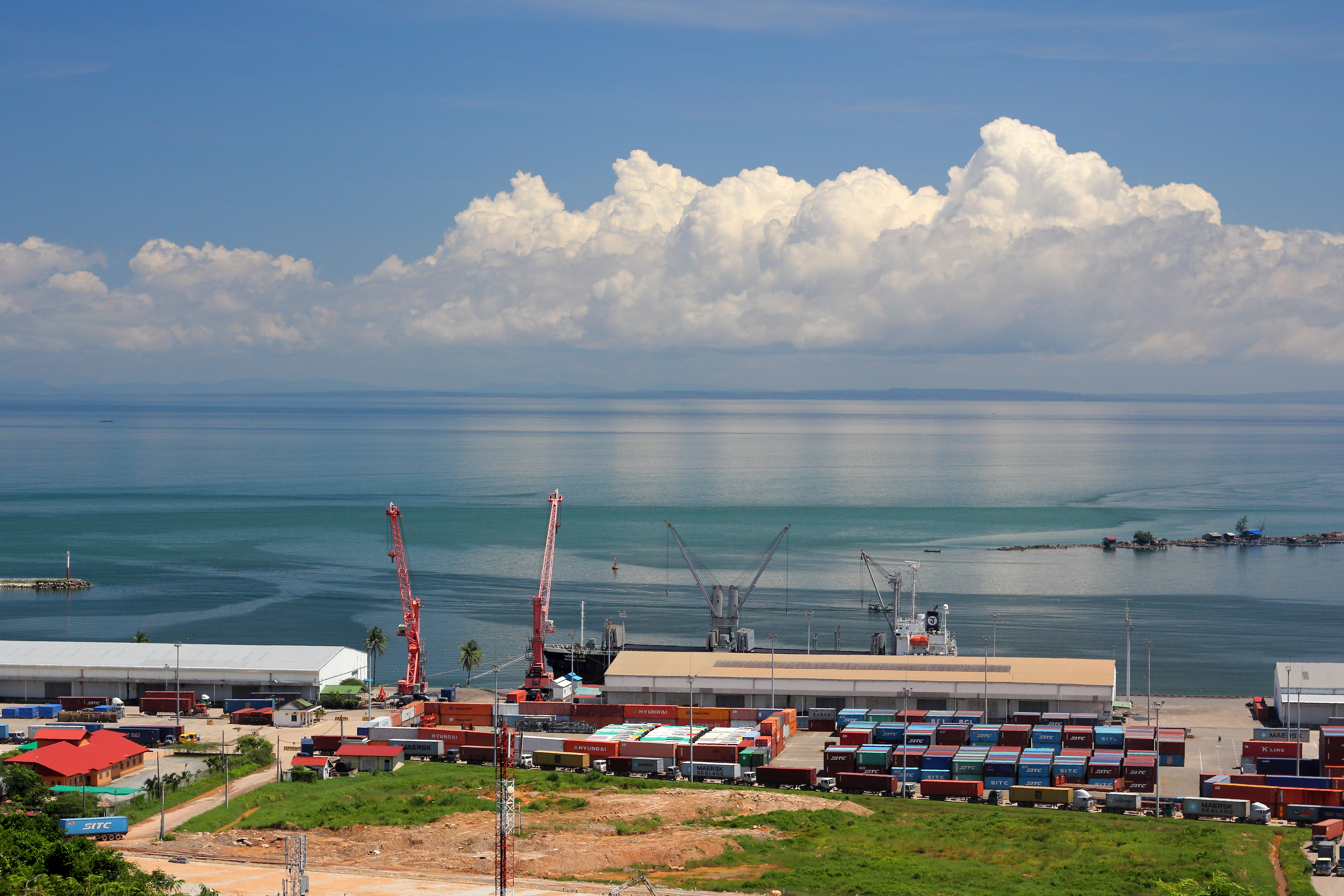

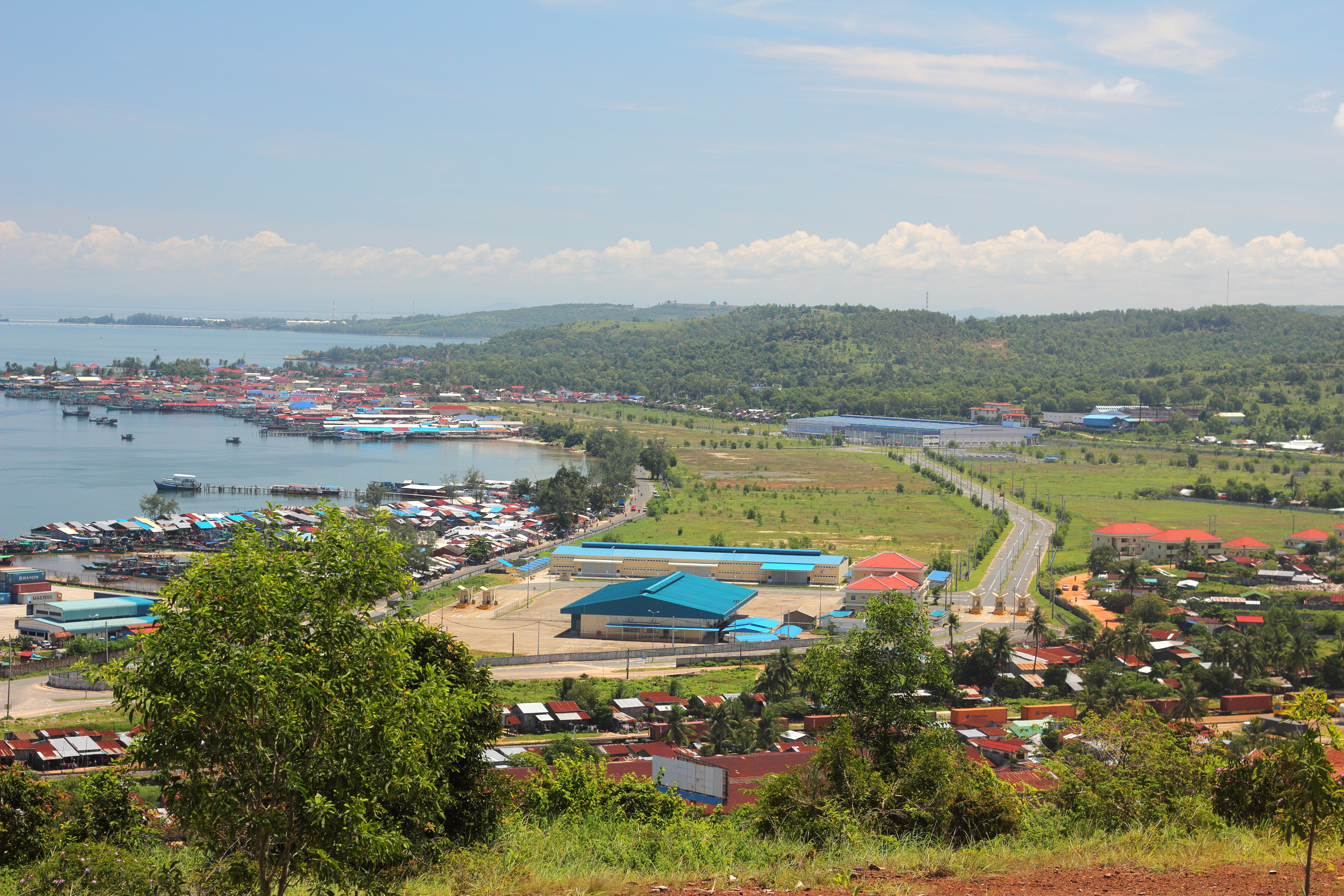
Sihanoukville Port Special Economic Zone (SPSEZ)

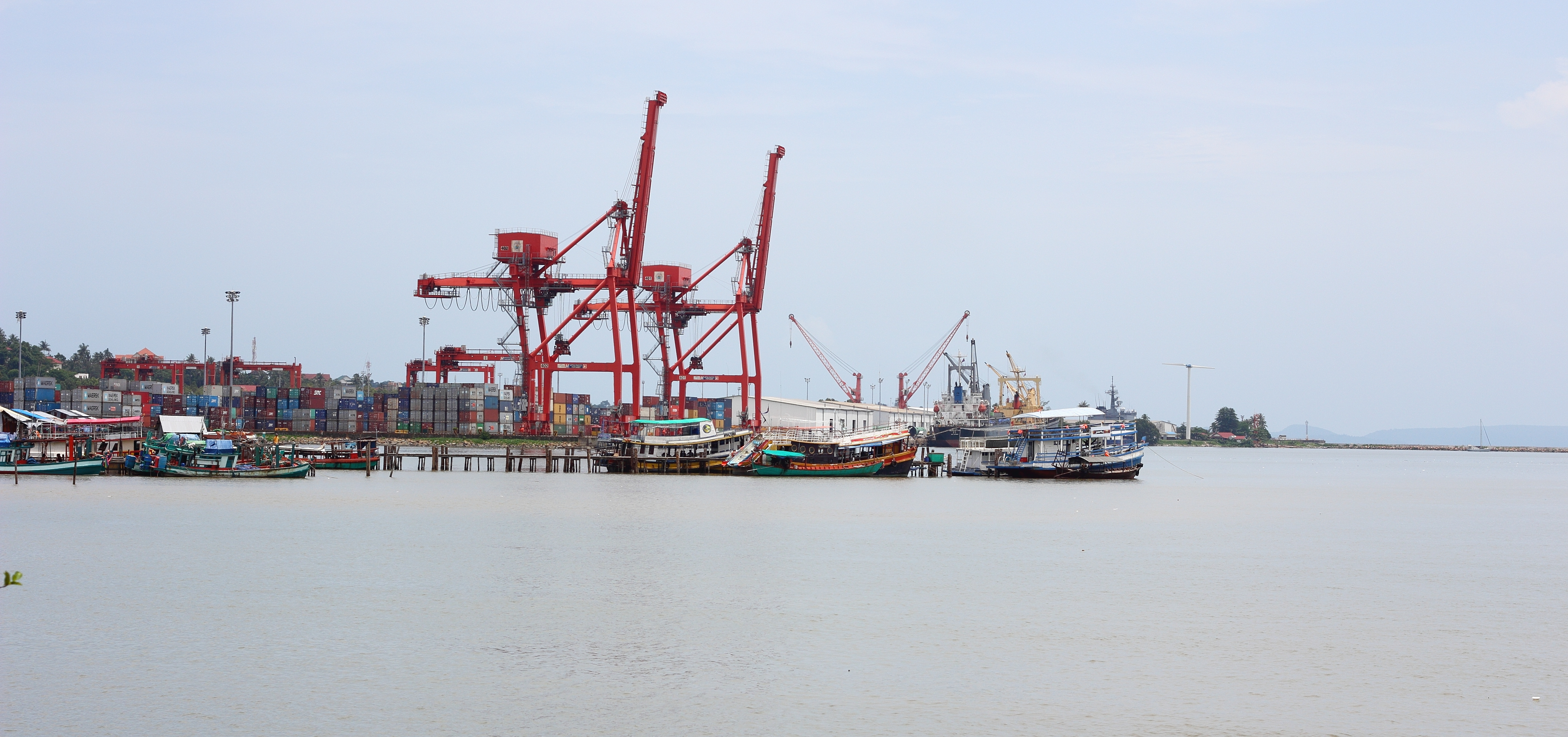

Sihanoukville Autonomous Port (Khmer: កំពង់ផែស្វយ័តក្រុងព្រះសីហនុ; French: Port autonome du Sihanoukville, PAS) is a government agency and state corporation of Cambodia and Sihanoukville that operates and governs the country's sole deep water port. In Sihanoukville, on the Bay of Kampong Som of the Gulf of Thailand in south-western Cambodia. The port was inaugurated in 1960 as construction of the Old Jetty's four berths had begun in 1955.

Since the port has continuously been extended. Several berths, a container terminal, a tanker terminal and an industrial effluent treatment plant were added. There are nine berths available for medium ships with a maximum draft of 8.5 m (28 ft). The total berth length is 1,330 m (4,364 ft) and the tidal variation is 1.4 m (5 ft). The decking for the original pier laid in 1958 consisted of 137 pre-stressed concrete beams, each 35 m (115 ft) long and weighing around 90 tons. The beams were assembled on site and proved to be very difficult to maneuver. A small railway was constructed to transport the beams from the assembly site.

In order to cope with the increasing rates of cargo throughput, the government of Cambodia had constructed another 350 m (1,148 ft)-long new quay with −10.5 m (−34 ft) maximum draft in 1966. At present, this new quay can accommodate three vessels with −7 m (−23 ft) draft.

The construction of the Container Terminal, 400 m (1,312 ft) long by −10.5 m (−34 ft) depth and a 6.5 ha (16 acres) container yard was completed in March 2007.

PAS' board of directors is appointed by a variety of government ministries. The port employs currently more than 1000 persons. In 2003, PAS acquired the remaining 70% of the Cambodia CWT Dry Port near Phnom Penh. In addition to the 30% share already held, this made the state-owned Sihanoukville Autonomous Port the sole proprietor of the dry port. The port became a listed company in June 2017 in the Cambodia Securities Exchange.

== History ==
Before and during the period of the French Protectorate, no deep water port existed to handle international marine trade. The small port at the Tonle Sap River near Phnom Penh had insufficient capabilities, as it handled ships of up to 3000 tons during the dry season and 4000 tons during the wet season. Kampot was Cambodia's only marine port, on the Tuk Chhou River around 5 km (3 mi) inland, which could not be accessed by deep-water vessels. The French colonial administration preferred to use Saigon for international trade and the Mekong River for further distribution. Thus Cambodia's access to high sea's trade was via the Mekong which required passage through Vietnamese territory. Independence from France for both Vietnam and Cambodia in 1953 highlighted the need for a Cambodian deep-water port.

A number of sites were initially considered suitable for the new facility, including Kampot, the small outpost at Ream, and Sre Ambel. However, the deep waters off a rocky promontory near Koh Pos at the mouth of the Kampong Som Bay were finally chosen as the site for Cambodia's first ocean port.

Construction began in 1955 with US$12 million in funding from the French government and was completed in late-1959. The port was inaugurated in April 1960 by Louis Jacquinot, the French Minister of State.

The first marina, near the breakwater island of Koh Preab, Sihanoukville, went into service in October 2013.

== Traffic ==
In 2018, the port earned US$8.7 million in profits, up 43% from 2017. It handled 537,107 TEUs, up 17%, totalling 5.2 million tonnes.

	Sihanoukville Autonomous Port Traffic Rates								
Item	2012	2013	2014	2015	2016	2017	2018	2019	2020
Gross Throughput (Tons)	2,659,785	3,012,217	3,423,919	3,763,296	4,040,155	-	5,328,348	6,547,756	6,601,804
Not Included Fuel	1,874,750	2,088,274	2,436,933	2,638,043	2,881,378	-	-	-	-
General Cargo	302,463	272,463	310,261	258,274	379,292	-	356,776	520,683	349,820
Cargo Containerized	1,572,287	1,815,811	2,126,672	2,379,969	2,502,086	-	3,388,923	4,148,729	4,363,820
Container Throughput (TEUs)	255,378	286,450	333,904	391,819	400,187	-	541,228	639,211	641,842
Vessel Calling (Units)	941	988	1,103	1,292	1,322	-	1,451	1,662	1,582

== See also ==
- Government of Cambodia
- Transport in Cambodia
- Port authority
- Port operator
- Sihanoukville
- Sihanoukville railway station
