= Dong Peng =

Protected area in Cambodia

Dong Peng Multiple Use Management Area
- IUCN category IV (habitat/species management area)
- Location within Cambodia
- Location: Koh Kong Province, Cambodia
- Nearest city: Sihanoukville
- Coordinates: 11°9.131′N 103°40.734′E
- Area: 27,700 ha (107 sq mi)
- Established: 1993

Dong Peng is a protected multiple use management area in the Koh Kong Province of Cambodia. It is located on the north end of the Bay of Kompong Som.
