= Sanka Rokhavan Wildlife Sanctuary =

Protected area in Cambodia

Sorng Rokha Vorn Wildlife Sanctuary
- ដែនជមកសត្វពសង្ឃរុក្ខាវ័ន, Monks Community Forest (MCF)
- Location within Cambodia
- Location: Samraong municipality, Oddar Meanchey province
- Nearest city: Samraong
- Coordinates: 14°11′36″N 103°38′53″E
- Area: 302.54 km^{2} (116.81 sq mi)
- Established: 5 April 2018
- Governing body: Ministry of Environment (Cambodia)

Sorng Rokha Vorn Wildlife Sanctuary (Khmer: ដែនជមកសត្វពសង្ឃរុក្ខាវ័ន) is a protected area located in northwest Cambodia created in 2018, covering 30,254 hectares. It is under threat from significant illegal logging and deforestation. Community members attempting to protect the forest in this area and the nearby Prey Lang Wildlife Sanctuary have "see[n] an increase in the number and severity of the threats to the community patrol members. This includes threats to property, family members, threats of arrests by authorities and [threats of] killings".

== External ==
- Map of protected areas in Cambodia
