= Bay of Kampong Som =

Bay in Cambodia

- ឆ្នេរកំពង់សោម (Khmer)
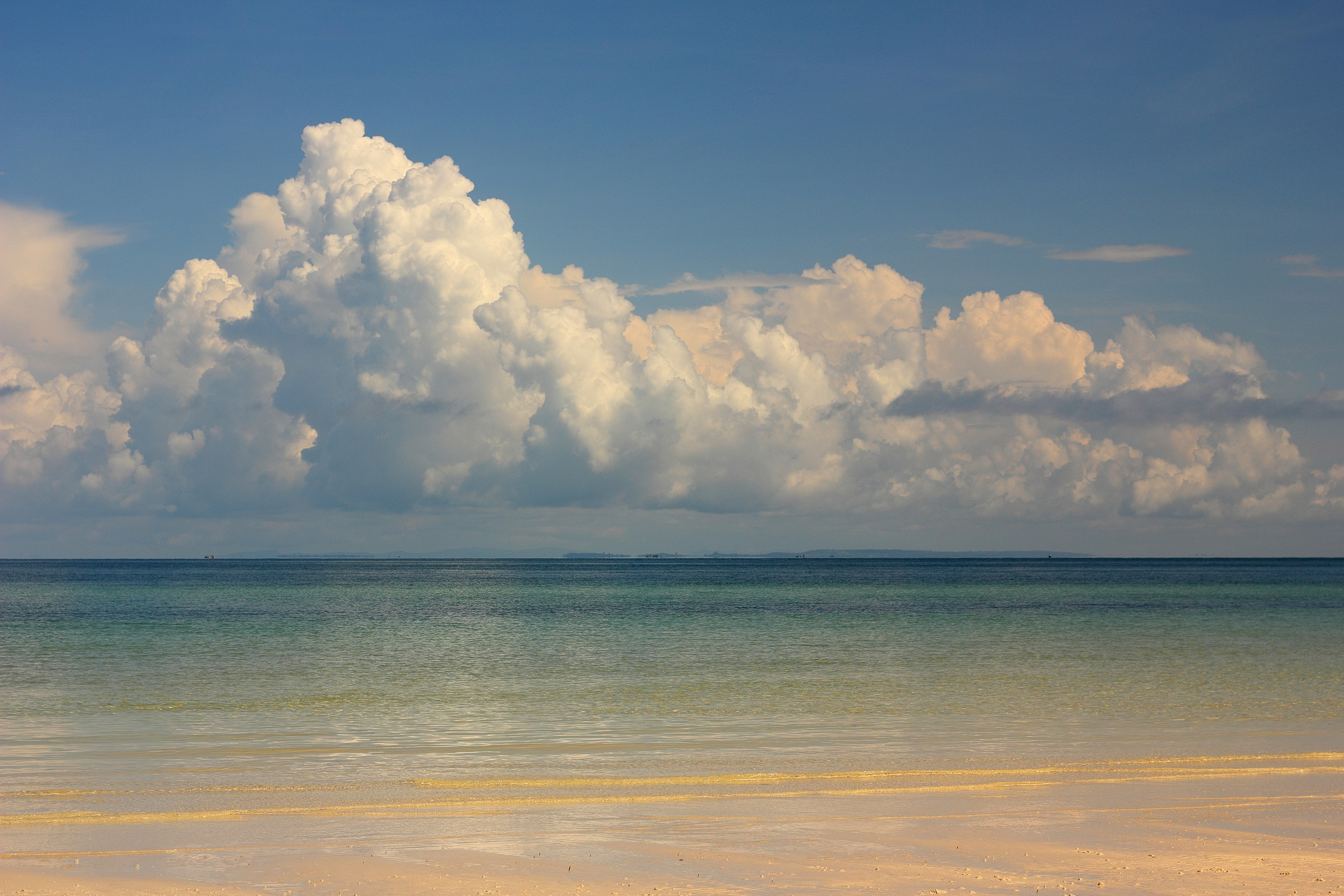

- Location: Cambodia
- Coordinates: 10.80°N 103.51°E

The Bay of Kampong Som is a southern bay of Cambodia. Kampong Som has a deep water inshore and a chain of islands across the mouth which protect the bay from storms. Deforestation of Indochina mangroves has become issues. Kompong Som is also the location of Dong Peng and Sihanoukville with its Sihanoukville Autonomous Port, the main and only deep-water maritime port of Cambodia.
