= Stung Sen Wildlife Sanctuary =

Protected area in Cambodia

- Location within Cambodia
- Location: Kampong Thom Province, Cambodia
- Nearest city: Kampong Thom City
- Coordinates: 12°38′06″N 104°31′15″E
- Area: 6,335 ha (24.46 sq mi)
- Established: 2001

Ramsar Wetland
- Official name: Stung Sen
- Designated: 2 November 2018
- Reference no.: 2365

Stung Sen is a protected multiple use management area and wildlife sanctuary in the Kampong Thom Province of Cambodia. It is located near the south-eastern tip of the Tonlé Sap, one of three wildlife sanctuaries around the lake, including Boeng Tonlé Chhmar and Prek Toal.

== Vegetation ==
The dominant vegetation of the Stung Sen is open deciduous dipterocarp forest, permanent and seasonal wetlands and grasslands. The forests in the region are flooded in the rainy season. In the dry season, water recedes, leaving water only in a few permanent watercourses like the Stung Sen river and its larger tributaries and in small pools. These water bodies support semi-evergreen forest and thick bamboo forests.

== Birds ==
Stung Sen provides habitats for a number of threatened species. The sarus crane (Grus antigone) and lesser adjutant (Leptoptilos javanicus) breed here. Other globally threatened and near-threatened species like the giant ibis (Thaumatibis gigantea), white-shouldered ibis (Pseudibis davisoni), greater adjutant (Leptoptilos dubius), black-necked stork (Ephippiorhynchus asiaticus) and grey-headed fish eagle (Ichthyophaga ichthyaetus) have been recorded here. The sanctuary has been designated as a protected Ramsar site since 2018.
