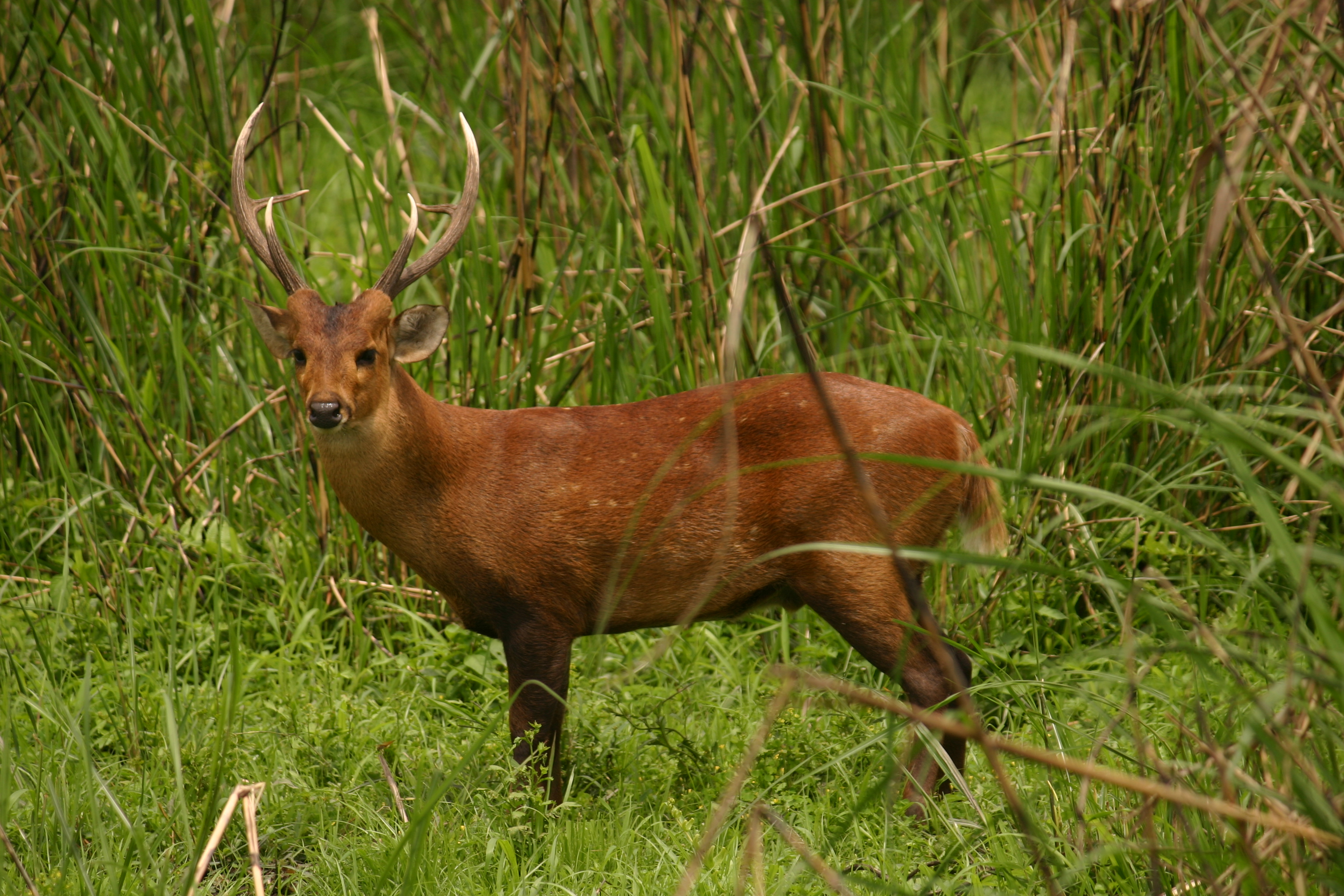

Conservation status
- Endangered (IUCN 3.1)
- CITES Appendix III (Note: Except subspecies Axis porcinus annamiticus, which is listed on CITES Appendix I.)

Scientific classification
- Kingdom: Animalia
- Phylum: Chordata
- Class: Mammalia
- Infraclass: Placentalia
- Order: Artiodactyla
- Family: Cervidae
- Genus: Axis
- Species: A. porcinus

Binomial name
- Axis porcinus (Zimmermann, 1780)
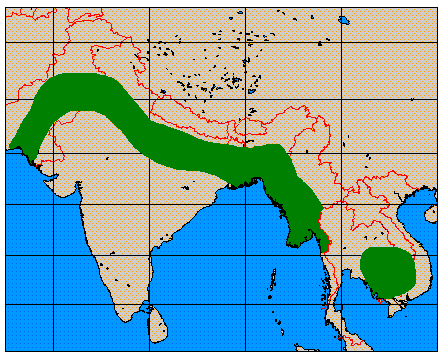
- Range in green

Synonyms
- Hyelaphus porcinus (Zimmermann, 1780)

= Indian hog deer =

Species of deer

The Indian hog deer (Axis porcinus), or Indochinese hog deer, is a small cervid native to the region of the Indian subcontinent and Indo-Gangetic Plain. Introduced populations are established in Australia, as well as the United States and Sri Lanka.

Its name derives from the hog-like manner in which it runs through forests (with its head hung low), to ease ducking under obstacles instead of leaping over them, like most other deer.

== Taxonomy ==
Cervus porcinus was the scientific name used by Eberhard August Wilhelm von Zimmermann in 1777 and 1780, based on an earlier description of Indian hog deer brought to England from India. It was placed in the genus Axis by William Jardine in 1835 and by Brian Houghton Hodgson in 1847. In 2004, it was proposed to be placed in the genus Hyelaphus. The proposal has not been accepted, with most authors keeping it under Axis. A subspecies, A. p. annamiticus, was once considered its own species, but is now generally considered the same species as A. porcinus.

== Description ==
A mature hog deer stag stands about 70 centimetres (28 in) at the shoulder, and weighs approximately 50 kilograms (110 lb); hinds are much smaller, standing about 61 centimetres (24 in) and weighing around 30 kilograms (66 lb). They are very solidly built, with a long body and relatively short legs; the line of the back slopes upward from the shoulders to a high rump. The ears are rounded; older animals tend to become light coloured in the face and neck. The Indian hog deer's coat is quite thick, and generally a uniform dark-brown in winter, except for the underparts of the body and legs, which are lighter in colour. During late spring, the change to a summer coat of rich reddish-brown commences, although this may vary between individuals. Many hog deer show a dark dorsal stripe extending from the head down the back of the neck, and along the spine. In summer, there is usually a uniform row of light-coloured spots along either side of the dorsal stripe from the shoulders to the rump. The tail is fairly short and brown, but tipped with white. The underside of the tail is white, and the deer can fan the white hairs out in a distinctive alarm display.

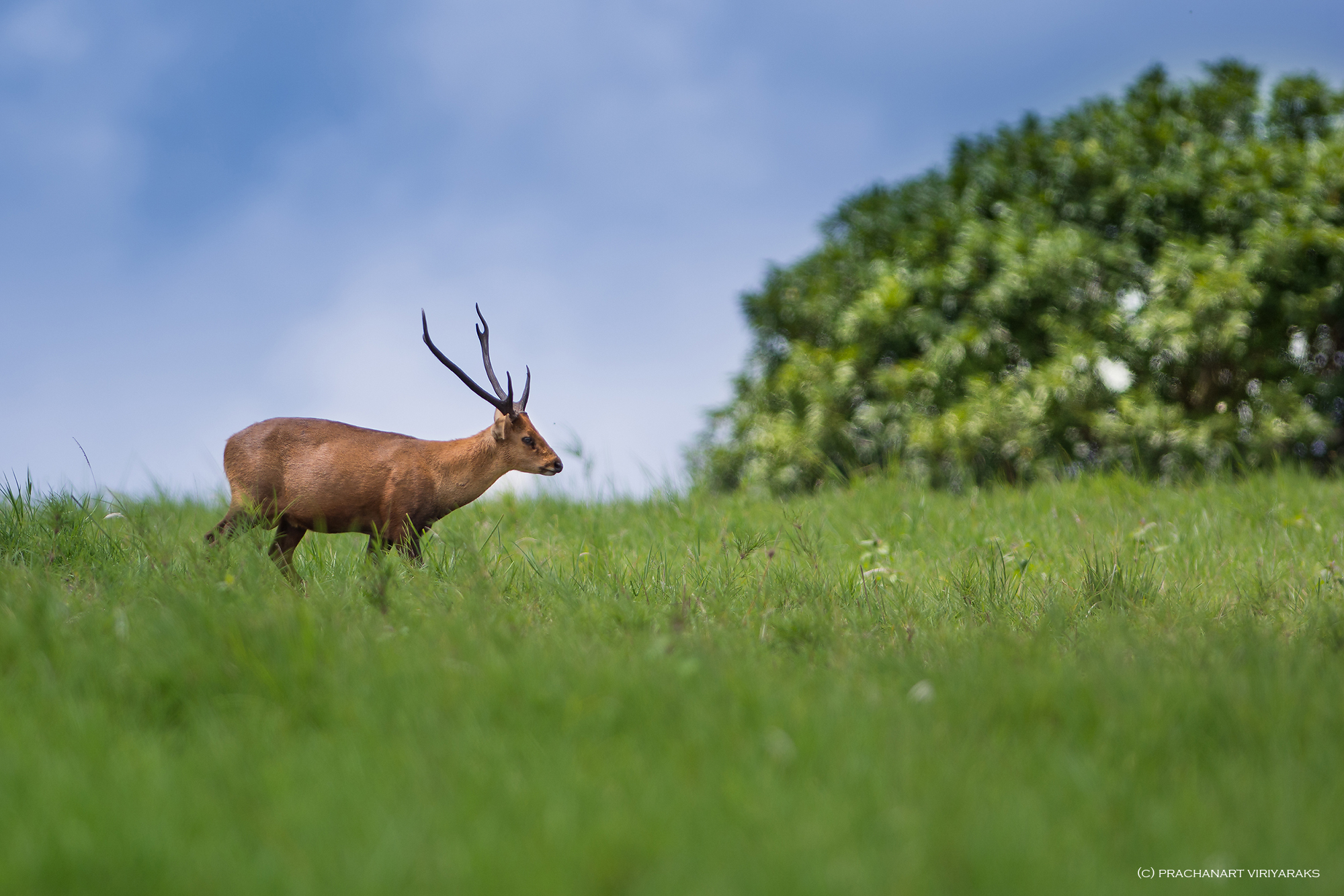
Indian hog deer in Phu Khieo Wildlife Sanctuary, Thailand

The antlers of a mature hog deer stag are typically three tined, having a brow tine and a solid main beam terminating in inner and outer top tines. However, antlers with more points are not uncommon.

== Distribution and habitat ==
The Indian hog deer occurs in the Indus River valley in Pakistan, in northern India, Nepal, southern Bhutan, Bangladesh, Myanmar China's Yunnan Province. It has been reintroduced to Thailand but is locally extinct in Laos and Vietnam. A small, isolated population lives in Cambodia's Prek Prasab Wildlife Sanctuary.

== Behaviour and ecology ==
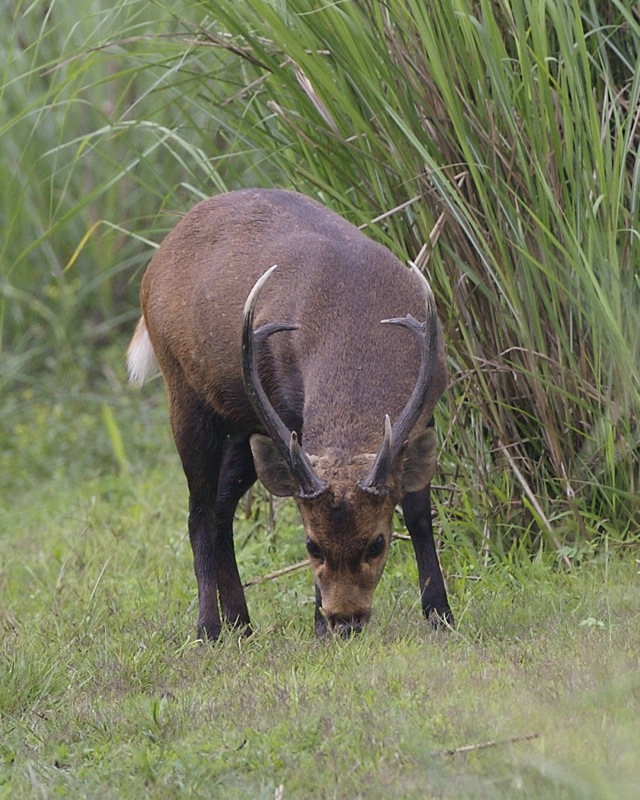
Male hog deer (buck) grazing in Kaziranga National Park, Assam

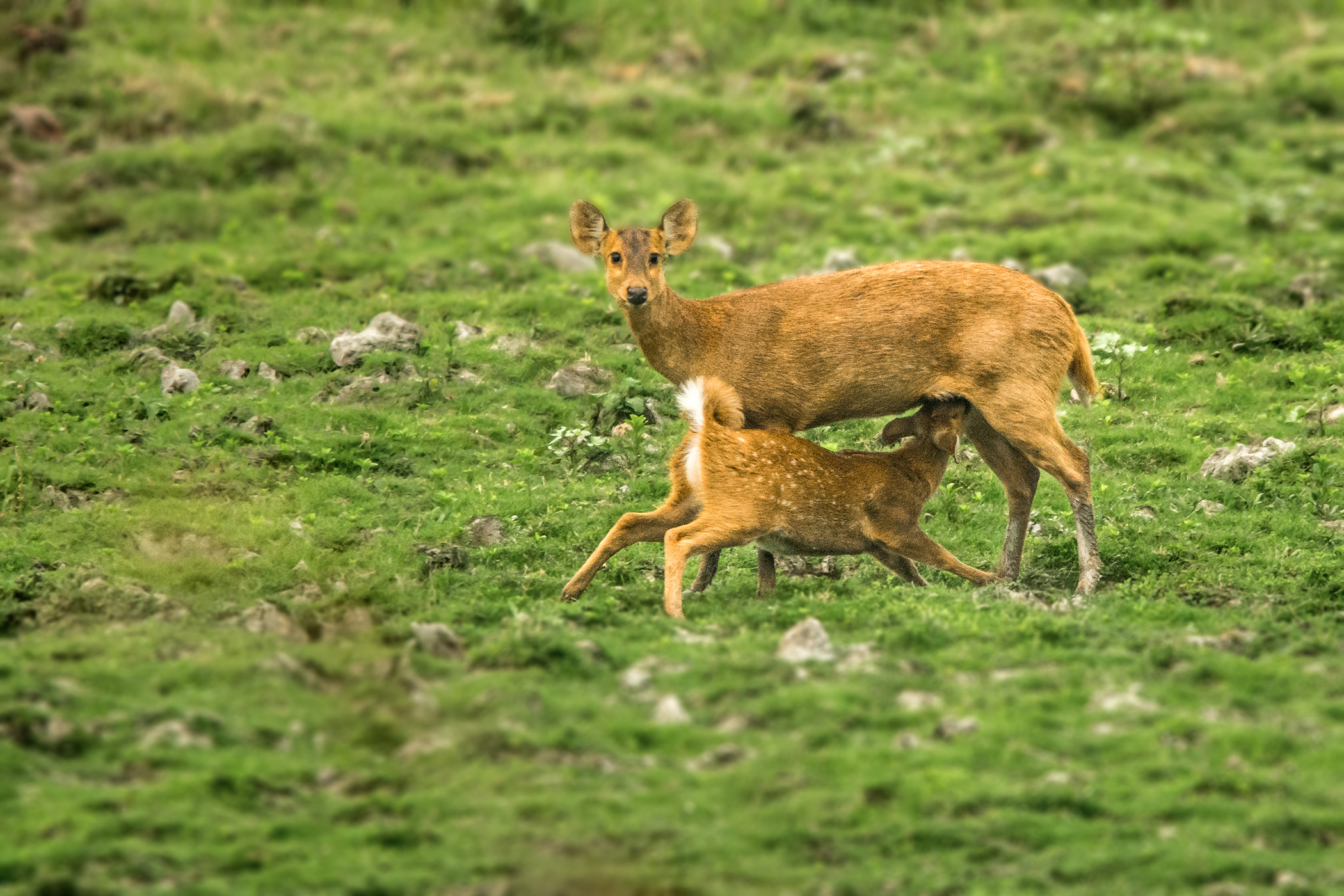
Female (doe) suckling fawn in Kaziranga, India

The tiger, leopard and clouded leopard are known predators of the Indian hog deer. Other known predators include the Burmese python and dhole.

== See also ==
- Chital
- Sambar deer
