= Snuol district =

Snuol district ស្នួល
- City District (srok)
- Location in Cambodia
- Coordinates: 12°11′37″N 106°28′25″E
- Country: Cambodia
- Province: Kratié
- Communes: 6
- Villages: 40

Population (2008)
  - Total: 61,603
- Time zone: UTC+7 (ICT)
- Geocode: 1005

Snuol (ស្នួល) is a district in Kratié province, Cambodia. According to the 1998 census of Cambodia, it had a population of 35,156. The population recorded by the 2008 census was 61,603. The city was the site of a major Vietnam War battle during the Cambodian Civil War. Snoul Wildlife Sanctuary was a protected area in the district, but it was degazetted in 2018 after extensive deforestation.

== Administration ==
As of 2020, the district contains the following communes and villages.

Khum (commune)	Phum (villages)
Khsuem	Mill, Choeung, Doung, Khsuem Knong, Khsuem Krau, Samrang, Srae Ro Neam, Srae Thmey
Pir Thnu	Choeung Khle, Cheung Khlu, Thma Hal Dei Kraham, Pravanh, Thma Hal Veal, Trapeang Srae, Chrab
Snuol	Kat Dai, Kbal Snuol, Krong, Preak Kdei, Snuol Kaeut, Thpong, Snuol Lech
Srae Char	Roha, Kbal Trach, Mak Kandal, Mean Chey, Treak, S'at
Svay Chreah	Thnal, Voat, Sambuor, Ta Saom, Srae Char, Ta Pum, Doun Mea, Rumpuk
Kronhoung Saen Chey	Kronhoung Saen Chey, Vealbei Chakrey Heng, Chros Chrov Pousal, Kronhoung Sen Chey Khang Choeung
