= Beng Per Wildlife Sanctuary =

Protected area in Cambodia

- Khmer: ដែនជម្រកសត្វព្រៃបឹងពែរ
- IUCN category IV (habitat/species management area)
- Location within Cambodia
- Location: Mostly Kampong Thom Province and Preah Vihear Province, Cambodia
- Coordinates: 13.2335°N 104.8510°E
- Area: 2,494.08 km^{2} (962.97 sq mi)
- Established: 1993
- Governing body: Ministry of Environment

Beng Per Wildlife Sanctuary is a 2,494.08 km^{2} (962.97 sq mi) large protected area in northern Cambodia that was established in 1993.

It is located south of the Northern Plains Dry Forest Priority Corridor. It hosts wild cattle and deer, large water birds and elephants, as well as important archaeological sites. The area is under threat from deforestation, with over 2,000 km^{2} (770 sq mi) of forest disappearing each year due to illegal logging, and the survival of many animal species is endangered. This deforestation is mostly driven by rubber plantations.
