= Snoul Wildlife Sanctuary =

Protected area in Cambodia

- ដែនជម្រកសត្វព្រៃស្នួល
- IUCN category IV (habitat/species management area)
- Location within Cambodia
- Location: Snuol District, Kratié Province, Cambodia
- Nearest city: Snuol
- Coordinates: 12°06′11″N 106°41′33″E
- Area: 619.43 km^{2} (239.16 sq mi)
- Established: 1993

Snoul Wildlife Sanctuary (Khmer: ដែនជម្រកសត្វព្រៃស្នួល) was a protected area located in eastern Cambodia on the border with Vietnam, created in 1993. It is classified as part of an Important Bird Area. The sanctuary, which had been suffering from illegal logging and deforestation for years, was dissolved in February 2018 by a royal decree. Chhay Duong Savuth, director of the Kratie province Environment Department, stated as the main reason the habitat destruction and illegal land settlement. However, a large proportion of the protected area was issued by the Royal Government of Cambodia as economic land concessions to private companies for agriculture use.

== External ==
- Snoul Wildlife Sanctuary, Cambodia
- Map of Protected areas system in Cambodia
