= Kulen Promtep Wildlife Sanctuary =

Protected area in northern Cambodia

- Khmer: ដែនជម្រកសត្វព្រៃគូលែនព្រហ្មទេព
- IUCN category IV (habitat/species management area)
- Location within Cambodia
- Location: Siem Reap Province and Preah Vihear Province, Cambodia
- Coordinates: 14°01′03″N 104°31′28″E
- Area: 4,068.25 km^{2} (1,570.76 sq mi)
- Established: 1993
- Governing body: Ministry of Environment

Kulen Promtep Wildlife Sanctuary is one of the largest protected areas in Cambodia and was set aside to protect the critically endangered, possibly extinct Kouprey. It was created by royal decree in 1993.

Kulen Promtep Wildlife Sanctuary is one of the last places on the planet where the giant ibis, a critically endangered species, can be found. It is also the national bird of Cambodia. The sanctuary is supported with the help of private donations as well as through an ethical eco-volunteer program.

== Geography ==
Kulen Promtep Wildlife Sanctuary is located in the northern plains of Cambodia near the border with Thailand. It contains lowland forest and the largest swamp in the country. It is part of the Central Indochina dry forests.
