= Mok Mareth =

Cambodian politician

His Excellency Mok Mareth MP
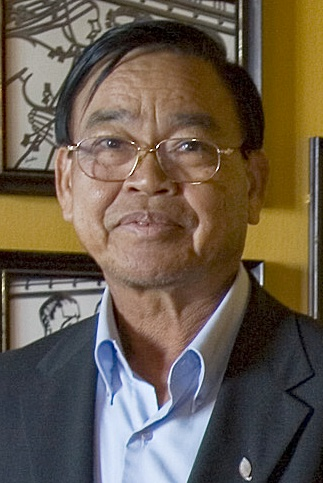
- Mareth in 2010

1st Minister of Environment
- In office 24 September 1993 – 23 September 2013
- Prime Minister: Norodom Ranariddh; Ung Huot; Hun Sen
- Preceded by: Position established
- Succeeded by: Say Sam Al

Chairman of the National Assembly Commission on Planning and Investment
- In office 23 September 2013 – 26 August 2014
- Succeeded by: Pol Hom

Member of Parliament for Takéo
- Incumbent
- Assumed office 27 September 2003
- Majority: 8,701 (1.68%)

Personal details
- Born: 20 January 1948 (age 78) Samraong, Takéo, Cambodia
- Party: Cambodian People's Party
- Education: Royal University of Agronomy Science (BS); Université Toulouse III Paul Sabatier (PhD)

Mok Mareth (Khmer: ម៉ុក ម៉ារ៉េត; born 20 January 1944) is a Cambodian politician and former Minister of the Environment. He was born in Rumchang, Samraŏng District, Takéo Province, Cambodia.

== Political career ==
Mareth was named a Senior Minister in the Cambodian Government in 2004 and is a member of the ruling Cambodian People's Party. He served as head of the Ministry of Environment from 1993 to 2013. Mok was also elected a Member of Parliament for Takeo province in 2003. He formerly served as Vice Minister of Agriculture (1989–1993) and Vice Governor of Phnom Penh (1980–1989). Prior to these positions he served as vice president of the Phnom Penh party committee (1981–1989).

== Studies ==
A natural scientist by training, Mareth earned a bachelor's degree in agronomy and fisheries engineering from the University of Agronomy, Phnom Penh, Cambodia in 1970 and his PhD in animal and aquatic biology from Paul Sabatier University, in Toulouse, France in 1974. After completing his doctoral work, he was a biological researcher at ORSTROM in France (1974–1976).
