= Roneam Daun Sam Wildlife Sanctuary =

Protected area in Cambodia

- ដែនជម្រកសត្វព្រៃរនាមដូនសំ
- Location within Cambodia
- Location: Battambang Province, Cambodia
- Nearest city: Battambang
- Coordinates: 13°16′48″N 102°29′02″E
- Area: 399.61 km^{2} (154.29 sq mi), originally 1,787.50 km^{2} (690.16 sq mi)
- Established: 1 November 1993

Roneam Daun Sam Wildlife Sanctuary (Khmer: ដែនជម្រកសត្វព្រៃរនាមដូនសំ) was a protected area located in western Cambodia, created in 1993 by Royal Decree, originally covering 178,750 hectares, reduced to 39,961 hectares following several PADDD events. The sanctuary was dissolved in February 2018 by a royal decree. Sao Sopheap, then-spokesman for the Ministry of Environment said “Families of soldiers under the Khmer Rouge went to occupy areas of the Roneam Daun Sam Wildlife Sanctuary, and later during integration in 1998, the government decided to give people the land that they were occupying, and continuously provided land titles to them. So, those areas have lost function or are no longer used as wildlife sanctuaries.”

== External ==
- Map of Protected areas system in Cambodia
