= Courtship, marriage, and divorce in Cambodia =

Khmer Traditional wedding
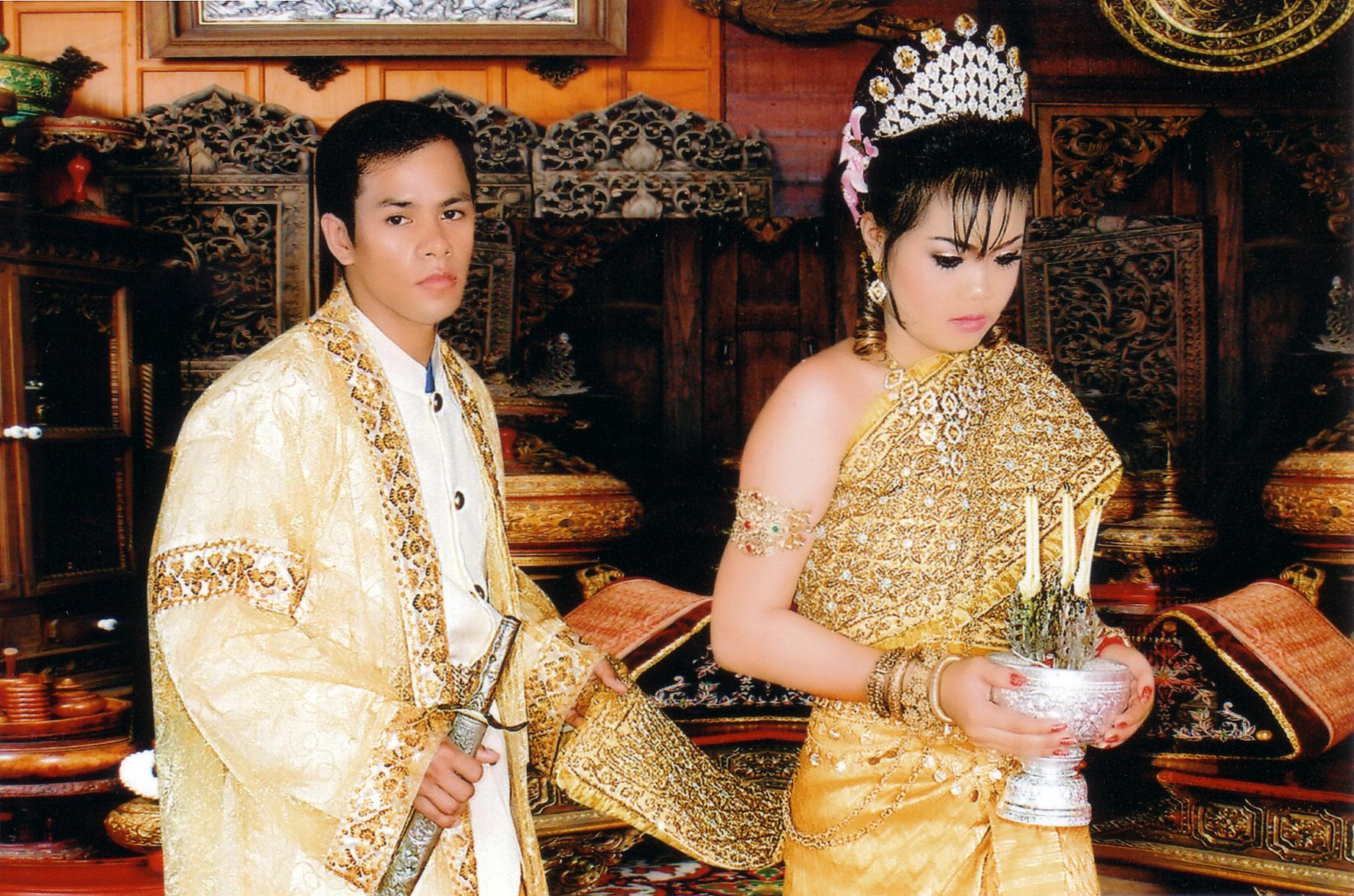
- Preahthaong Taong Sbai NeangNeak

Courtship, marriage, and divorce in Cambodia are important aspects of family life. Customs vary as between rural and urban areas, with many city dwellers being influenced by western ideas. The choice of a spouse is usually undertaken by the families of young men and women, sometimes with the help of a matchmaker. A man usually marries between the ages of nineteen and twenty-five and a woman between sixteen and twenty-two.

After a spouse has been selected, a go-between discusses the proposal with the parents, who need to be satisfied that the right choice is being made for their offspring. Presents are exchanged, and in rural areas, a young man may have to vow to serve his new father-in-law for a while.

The wedding usually lasts for a day and a half. It starts at the bride's home followed by a religious ceremony and exchange of ritual gifts. The garments worn are covered with jewelry as a mark of respect to the parents of bride and groom, and all the couple's relatives and friends are present. The parents offer blessings and the couple prays to the monks for a happy life. In theory a man could have only one wife.

Divorce is possible but is looked on askance by the community. A magistrate may legalize the divorce. Both parents have obligations for the continuing support of any children and can remarry if they wish.

== Early years ==
Though adolescent Cambodian children usually play with members of the same sex, boys and girls take part in group games during festivals, offering them the opportunity to begin looking for future partners. Virginity is seen as highly valued in brides, and premarital sex is seen negatively. A woman who becomes pregnant out of wedlock is seen as bringing shame to her family.

The choice of a spouse is a complex decision which may involve the parents and friends of the potential couple, as well as a matchmaker. A young man can decide on a likely spouse on his own and then ask his parents to arrange the marriage negotiations, or the young person's parents may make the choice of spouse, giving the child little to say in the selection. In theory, a woman may veto the spouse her parents have chosen. In rural areas a young man may take a vow serve his prospective father-in-law for a period of time.

== Courtship ==
Courtship patterns differ between rural and urban Khmer. Attitudes in the larger cities have been influenced by Western ideas of romantic love that do not apply in the countryside. A man usually marries between age 19 and 25, and a woman typically marries between age 16 and 22. Marriage between close blood relatives is common. After a spouse has been selected, a go-between meets with the parents and broaches the subject of marriage.

Each family will then investigate the other to make sure its child is marrying into a good family. When both sides agree to the marriage and presents have been exchanged and accepted, the families consult an achar to set the wedding date. In rural areas, there is a form of bride-service; that is, the young man may take a vow to serve his prospective father-in-law for a period of time.

== Wedding ==
The traditional wedding can involve a long celebration. Formerly it lasted three days, but by the 1980s it more commonly lasted a day and a half. The ceremony begins in the morning at the home of the bride and is directed by the achar. Buddhist priests offer a short sermon and recite prayers of blessing. Parts of the ceremony involve ritual hair cutting and tying cotton threads soaked in holy water around the couple's wrists.

The Khmer Rouge divided families and separated the men from the women. The father, mother, and children frequently were separated for many months. A man and woman often did not have time to consummate a marriage, and sexual relations were limited by long separations. Extramarital relations and even flirtations between young people were heavily punished.

The legend of Preah Thaong and Neang Neak explains many Khmer wedding customs, in which the groom carries the bride's scarf, symbolizing that he is from afar and is marrying into her family, in contrast to Indian wedding customs where the bride holds the groom's scarf. The bride and groom wear garments decorated with jewelry and are surrounded by family and guests. The couple's garments are a sign of respect to their parents and parents-in-law, both of whom offer their blessings to the couple.

== Polygamy ==
While polygamy is technically illegal in Cambodia, and has been since 1989, it is still practiced, either with marriage certificates or informally. The first wife may veto the taking of a second wife. Concubinage also exists, although it is more frequent in the cities. While second wives have certain legal rights, concubines do not have the rights of a wife. Couples who choose to be in a polygamous arrangement may be met with criticism and social stigma.

== Divorce ==
Grounds for divorce in Cambodia are described under Article 39 of the Law on Marriage and Family, “A husband or a wife is eligible to file for a divorce only if the reasons are sufficiently provided enough to clarify that each partner is unable to further sustain the family bond.”

Common reasons are to be listed as follows:

1. Abandoning household responsibility, failure to provide food, irresponsible parenthood.

2. Insults and physical violence toward spouse.

3. Immoral behaviors

4. Erectile dysfunction

5. Spouse separation exceeding one year

The majority of divorce cases in Cambodia (70%) are filed by women. Divorced people are viewed with some disapproval, and they are not invited to take part in the blessing of a newlywed couple. Each spouse retains whatever property he or she brought into the marriage. Property acquired jointly is divided equally. Divorced people may remarry, but the woman must wait 120 days before remarrying, a law meant to protect the paternity rights of her previous husband in the case that she is pregnant.

Custody of minor children is usually given to the mother. Both parents continue to have an obligation to contribute financially toward the rearing and education of the child, however it is common for husbands not to pay alimony or child support payments.
