= Prek Prasab Wildlife Sanctuary =

Protected area in Cambodia

- ដែនជម្រកសត្វព្រៃព្រែកប្រសព្
- Location within Cambodia
- Location: Cambodia
- Nearest city: Kratié
- Coordinates: 12.7221°N 105.9390°E
- Area: 127.70 km^{2} (49.31 sq mi)
- Established: 5 October 2018
- Governing body: Ministry of Environment

Prek Prasab Wildlife Sanctuary (Khmer: ដែនជម្រកសត្វព្រៃព្រែកប្រសព្វ) is a 12,770 ha protected area in eastern Cambodia, located in Kratié province. The area was formally protected in October 2018.

The area is of particular importance for the endangered hog deer, (Axis porcinus), with an estimated population 84 individuals. Hog deer were thought extinct in Cambodia until the 2006 rediscovery of a population in this area. The protected area is under threat from illegal forest clearance, snaring, and poaching with dogs.
