= Ministry of Environment (Cambodia) =

Government ministry of Cambodia

Coordinates: 11.5558°N 104.9316°E

- ក្រសួងបរិស្ថាន; Krâsuŏng Bârĭsthan
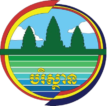

Agency overview
- Formed: 24 September 1993
- Jurisdiction: Royal Government of Cambodia
- Headquarters: Morodok Techo Building (Lot 503), Tonle Bassac, Chamkarmorn, Phnom Penh 120101, Cambodia
- Minister responsible: Eang Sophalleth, Minister of Environment
- Website: moe.gov.kh

The Ministry of Environment (Khmer: ក្រសួងបរិស្ថាន, UNGEGN: Krâsuŏng Bârĭsthan) is a government ministry of Cambodia charged with environmental protection.

The current minister is Say Sam Al, succeeding Mok Mareth in 2013.

== Ministers ==
No.	Portrait	Name	In office			Party
No.	Portrait	Name	From	To	Duration	Party
1		Mok Mareth ម៉ុក ម៉ារ៉េត (b. 1949)	24 September 1993	23 September 2013	19 years, 364 days	CPP
2		Say Sam Al សាយ សំអាល់ (b. 1980)	24 September 2013	22 August 2023	9 years, 332 days	CPP
3		Eang Sophalleth អៀង សុផល្លែត	22 August 2023	Present	2 years, 351 days	CPP

General Department	Department
General Department of Environmental Protectionresponsible for the Ministry of Environment in managing and coordinating environmental protection	Department of Administration, Planning and Finance
General Department of Environmental Protectionresponsible for the Ministry of Environment in managing and coordinating environmental protection	Air Quality and Sound Management Department
General Department of Environmental Protectionresponsible for the Ministry of Environment in managing and coordinating environmental protection	Water Quality Management Department
General Department of Environmental Protectionresponsible for the Ministry of Environment in managing and coordinating environmental protection	Solid Waste Management Department
General Department of Environmental Protectionresponsible for the Ministry of Environment in managing and coordinating environmental protection	Hazardous Substances Management Department
General Department of Environmental Protectionresponsible for the Ministry of Environment in managing and coordinating environmental protection	Environmental Impact Assessment Department
General Department of Environmental Protectionresponsible for the Ministry of Environment in managing and coordinating environmental protection	Department of Inspection and Law Enforcement
General Department of Environmental Protectionresponsible for the Ministry of Environment in managing and coordinating environmental protection	Laboratory
General Department of Environmental Knowledge and Informationresponsible for the Ministry of Environment in managing environmental data and directing environmental education and environmental outreach, as well as organizing important ceremonies regarding the environment.	Department of Administration, Planning and Finance
General Department of Environmental Knowledge and Informationresponsible for the Ministry of Environment in managing environmental data and directing environmental education and environmental outreach, as well as organizing important ceremonies regarding the environment.	Department of Environmental Education
General Department of Environmental Knowledge and Informationresponsible for the Ministry of Environment in managing environmental data and directing environmental education and environmental outreach, as well as organizing important ceremonies regarding the environment.	Department of Geographic Information Service
General Department of Environmental Knowledge and Informationresponsible for the Ministry of Environment in managing environmental data and directing environmental education and environmental outreach, as well as organizing important ceremonies regarding the environment.	Department of Environmental Information and Dissemination
General Department of Environmental Knowledge and Informationresponsible for the Ministry of Environment in managing environmental data and directing environmental education and environmental outreach, as well as organizing important ceremonies regarding the environment.	Rewards and Incentives Department
General Department of Administration and Financeresponsible for the Ministry of Environment to lead, manage and coordinate general administration, personnel, finance, state property and planning.	Department of Administration
General Department of Administration and Financeresponsible for the Ministry of Environment to lead, manage and coordinate general administration, personnel, finance, state property and planning.	Department of Human Resources
General Department of Administration and Financeresponsible for the Ministry of Environment to lead, manage and coordinate general administration, personnel, finance, state property and planning.	Department of Planning and Budget
General Department of Administration and Financeresponsible for the Ministry of Environment to lead, manage and coordinate general administration, personnel, finance, state property and planning.	State Property Management Department
General Department of Administration and Financeresponsible for the Ministry of Environment to lead, manage and coordinate general administration, personnel, finance, state property and planning.	Department of Finance and Accounting
General Department of Nature Protection and Conservation Administrationresponsible for the Ministry of Environment in managing and coordinating the work of biodiversity conservation and the appropriate and sustainable use of natural resources in protected areas.	Department of Administration, Planning and Finance
General Department of Nature Protection and Conservation Administrationresponsible for the Ministry of Environment in managing and coordinating the work of biodiversity conservation and the appropriate and sustainable use of natural resources in protected areas.	Department of Conservation of the East Mekong River Protected Area
General Department of Nature Protection and Conservation Administrationresponsible for the Ministry of Environment in managing and coordinating the work of biodiversity conservation and the appropriate and sustainable use of natural resources in protected areas.	Department of Conservation of the Tonle Sap South Inland Protected Area
General Department of Nature Protection and Conservation Administrationresponsible for the Ministry of Environment in managing and coordinating the work of biodiversity conservation and the appropriate and sustainable use of natural resources in protected areas.	Department of Conservation of the Northern Tonle Sap Protected Area
General Department of Nature Protection and Conservation Administrationresponsible for the Ministry of Environment in managing and coordinating the work of biodiversity conservation and the appropriate and sustainable use of natural resources in protected areas.	Freshwater Wetland Conservation Department
General Department of Nature Protection and Conservation Administrationresponsible for the Ministry of Environment in managing and coordinating the work of biodiversity conservation and the appropriate and sustainable use of natural resources in protected areas.	Department of Marine and Coastal Conservation
General Department of Nature Protection and Conservation Administrationresponsible for the Ministry of Environment in managing and coordinating the work of biodiversity conservation and the appropriate and sustainable use of natural resources in protected areas.	Department of Inspection and Law Enforcement
General Department of Local Communityresponsible for the Ministry of Environment to lead, manage and coordinate the development of local and community protected areas to contribute to the management, protection and Conservation of natural resources, biodiversity and ecosystems in protected areas.	Department of Administration, Planning and Finance
General Department of Local Communityresponsible for the Ministry of Environment to lead, manage and coordinate the development of local and community protected areas to contribute to the management, protection and Conservation of natural resources, biodiversity and ecosystems in protected areas.	Department of Community Livelihood
General Department of Local Communityresponsible for the Ministry of Environment to lead, manage and coordinate the development of local and community protected areas to contribute to the management, protection and Conservation of natural resources, biodiversity and ecosystems in protected areas.	Department of Heritage Areas
General Department of Local Communityresponsible for the Ministry of Environment to lead, manage and coordinate the development of local and community protected areas to contribute to the management, protection and Conservation of natural resources, biodiversity and ecosystems in protected areas.	Department of Ecotourism

== Programs ==
The ministry has jointly implemented the Northern Prey Lang landscape REDD+ project under Japan’s Joint Crediting Mechanism with Conservation International’s Cambodia programme (and Mitsui), which Cambodia’s safeguards reporting described as operational from 2018.

== See also ==
- Government of Cambodia
- Environment of Cambodia
