= List of rivers of Cambodia =

This is a list of rivers in Cambodia.

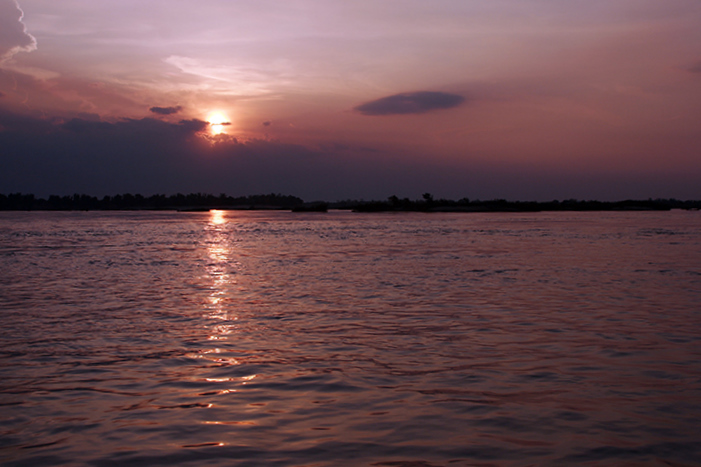
Mekong River in Kratié Province

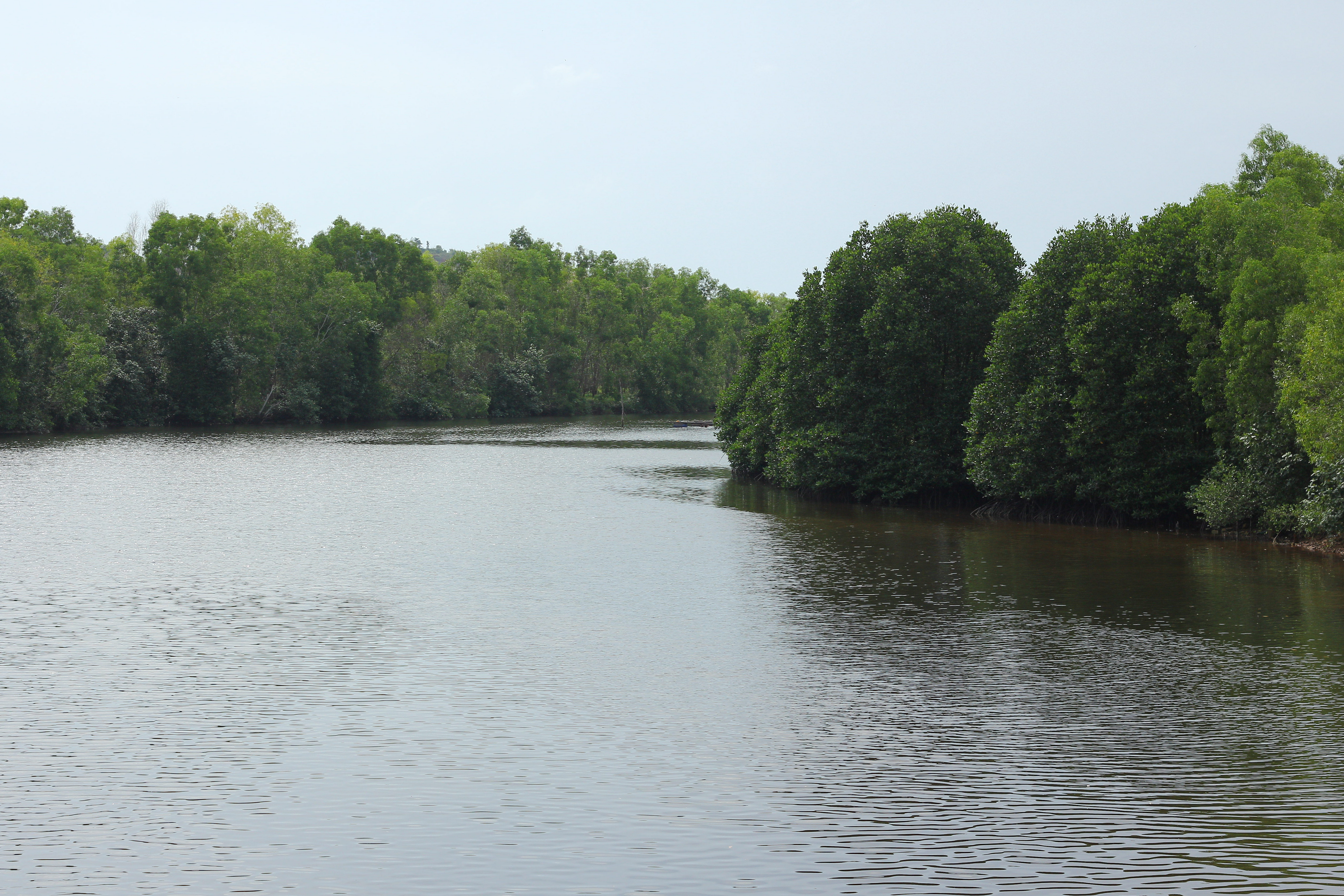
Hav River in Preah Sihanouk Province

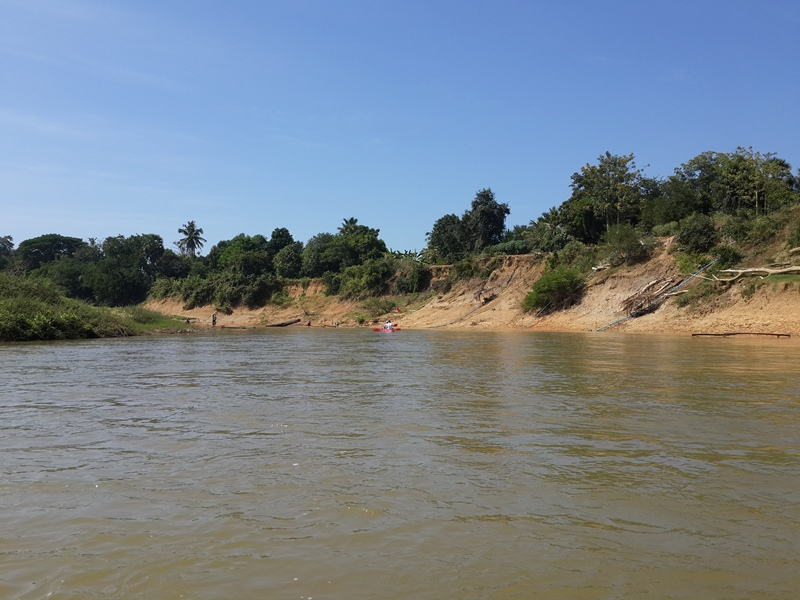
Sangkae River in Battambang Province

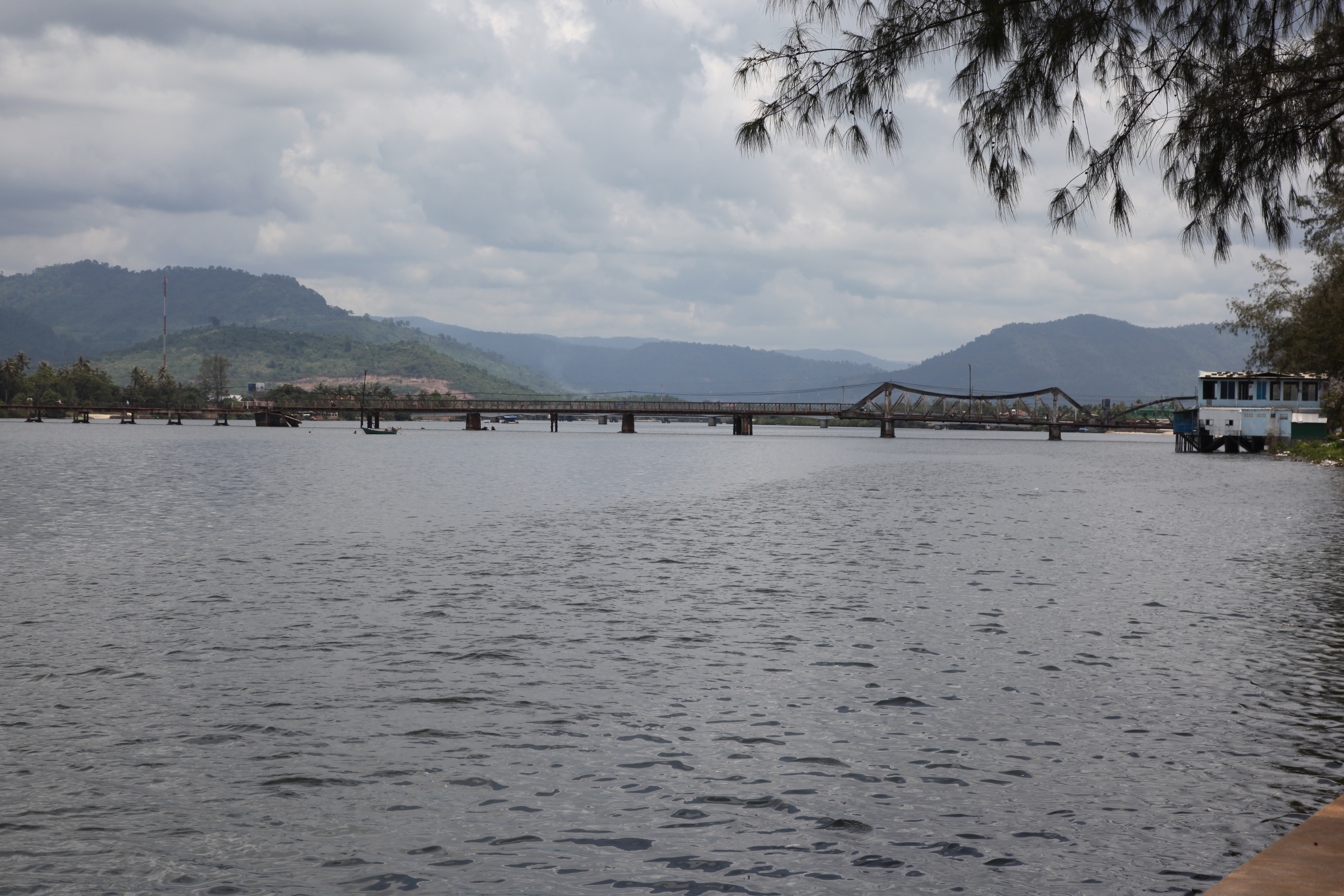
Teuk Chhou River in Kampot Province

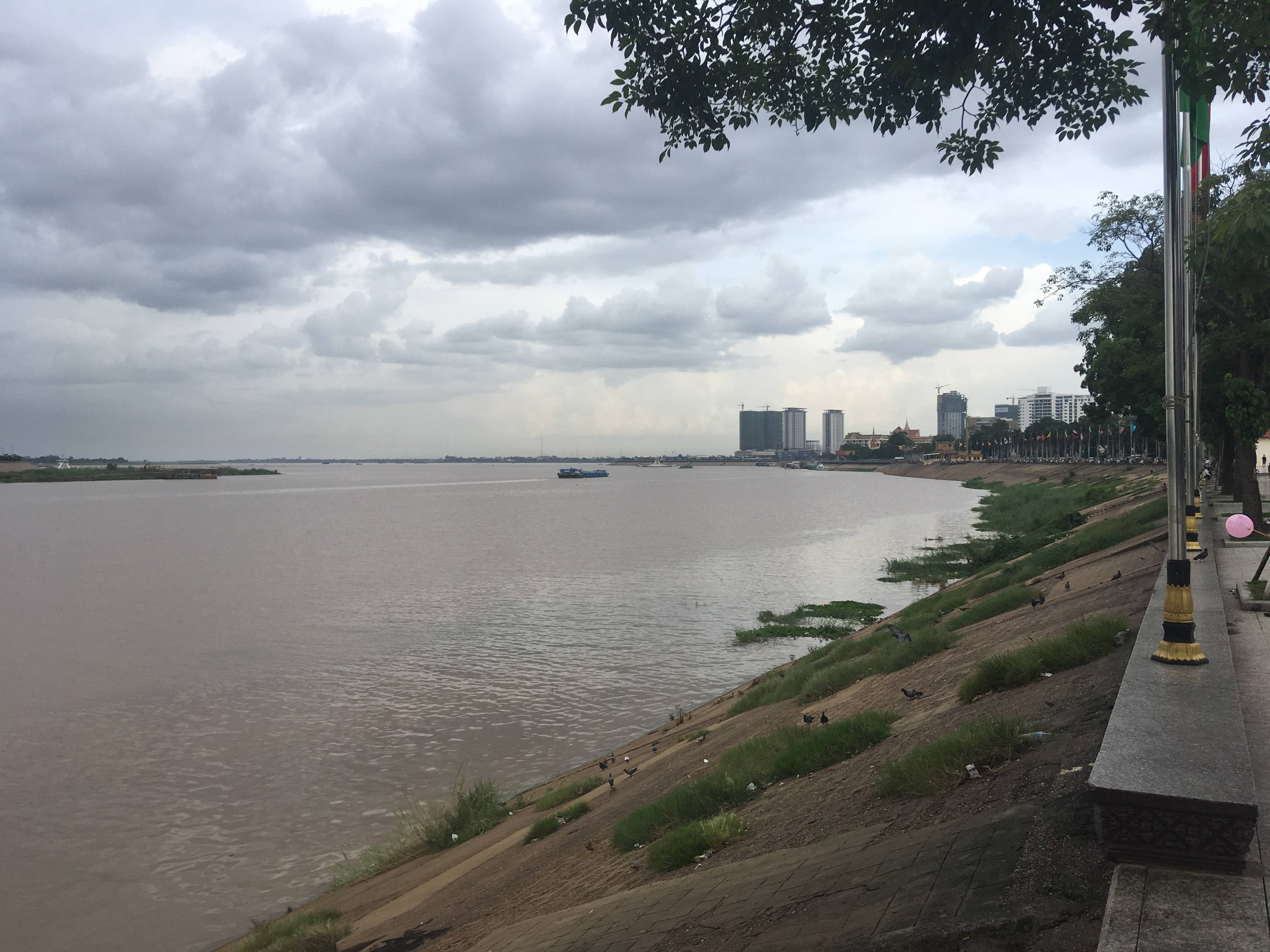
Tonle Sap near Phnom Penh

== By drainage basin ==
This list is arranged by drainage basin, with respective tributaries indented under each larger stream's name.

=== South China Sea ===
- Saigon River
- Mekong
  - Bassac River (Tonle Bassac; distributary)
  - Tonlé Sap
    - Krang Ponley River (Stung Krang Ponley)
    - Boribo River (Stung Boribo)
    - Chinit River (Stung Chinit)
      - Kambot River (Chinit River)
      - Slap River (Stung Slap)
      - Tang Krasang River (Stung Tag Krasang)
    - Sen River (Stung Sen)
      - Sraka Moan River (Stung Sraka Moan)
      - Kambot River (Sen River)
    - Stoung River (Stung Stoung)
      - Neang Sa Sngach River (Stung Neang Sa Sngach)
    - Chickreng River (Stung Chickreng)
    - Pursat River (also Pothisat River; Stung Pursat, also Stung Pothisat)
      - Peam River (Stung Peam)
    - Moung Russey River (Stung Moung Russey)
    - Roluos River (Stung Roluos)
    - Siem Reap River (Stung Siem Reap)
    - Kambot River (Tonlé Sap)
    - Sangkae River (also Sang Ke River; Stung Sangker, also Stung Sang Ke)
      - Chas River (Stung Chas)
      - Sreng River (Stung Sreng)
      - Battambang River (Stung Battambang)
      - Mongkol Borei River (Stung Mongkol Borei)
        - Pheas River (Stung Pheas)
        - Kampong Krasaing River (Stung Kampong Krasaing)
        - Sisophon River (Stung Sisophon)
        - Svay Chek River (Stung Svay Chek)
  - Tonlé San
    - Kong River (Stung Kong)
    - Srepok River (Stung Srepok)

=== Gulf of Thailand ===
- Kampong Trak River (Stung Kampong Trak)
- Kah Bpow River (Stung Kah Bpow)
- Tatai River (Stung Tatai)
