= Cambodia–Thailand border =

International border

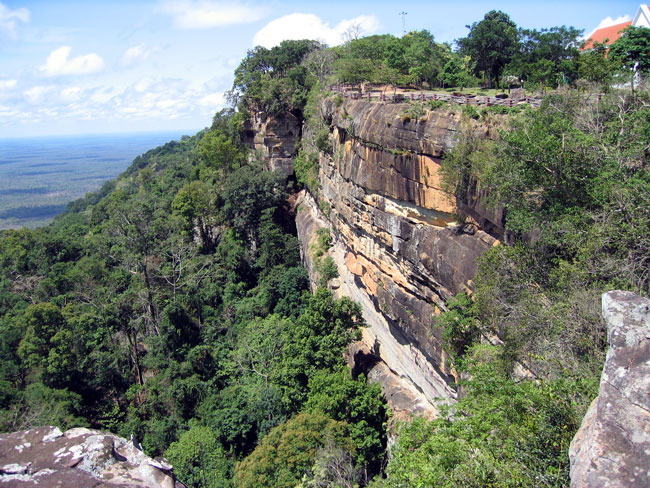
- The natural border between Cambodia (left) and Thailand (right) in Ban Nong Khanna Samakkhi area, Village No.8, Ta Miang Subdistrict, Phanom Dong Rak District, Surin Province, Thailand

Characteristics
- Length: 817 kilometres

History
- Current shape: 1907

The Cambodia–Thailand border is the international border between Cambodia and Thailand. The border is 817 km (508 mi) in length and runs from the tripoint with Laos in the north-east to the Gulf of Thailand in the south.

== Description ==
The border starts in the north-east at the tripoint with Laos at Preah Chambot peak in the Dângrêk Mountains and follows the crest of the mountains westwards. Upon leaving the mountains the border turns south-westwards in a broad arc, occasionally utilizing rivers such as the Svay Chek, the Sisophon, the Phrom Hot and Mongkol Borei. It then proceeds south, partly along the Cardamom Mountains, terminating at the Gulf of Thailand coast. This latter section runs very close to the Gulf, producing a long, thin strip of Thai territory.

== History ==
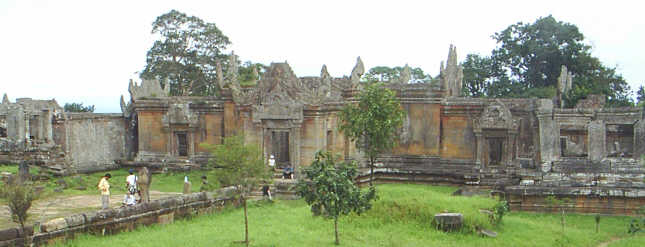
Preah Vihear, the disputed temple

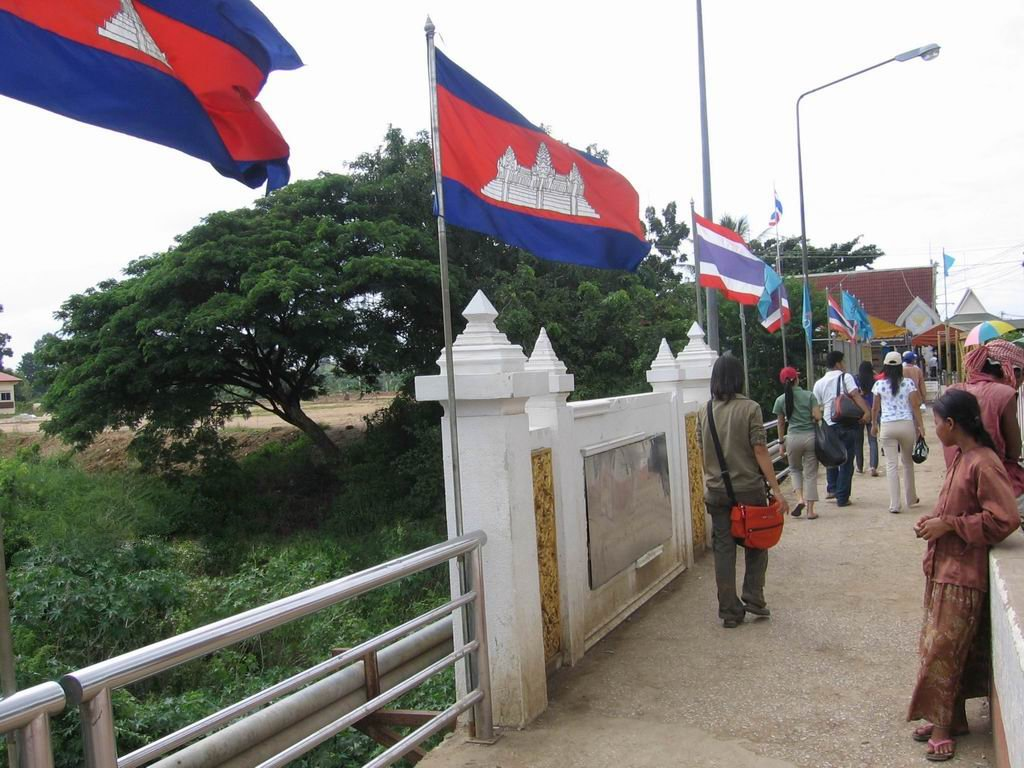
The border crossing at Poipet

=== Colonial period ===
The boundary area has historically switched back and forth between various Khmer and Thai empires. From the 1860s France began establishing a presence in the region, initially in modern Cambodia and Vietnam, and later Laos, with the colony of French Indochina being created in 1887. In 1867 a Franco-Thai treaty confirmed Thai ownership of the Battambang and Angkor (Nakhou Siemrap) regions. In 1896, Britain (based in Burma) and France agreed to leave Siam (the then name for Thailand) as a buffer state between their respective colonies. However France continued to expand at the expense of Siam, annexing northern Cambodia in 1904 and then Battambang, Sisophon and Siem Reap in 1907, whilst ceding Trat to Siam. The modern Cambodian-Thai border was as such delimited through several treaties between France and Siam between 1867 and 1907. Following the Japanese invasion of French Indochina in 1940 areas ceded to France in 1904 and 1907 were returned to Thailand, however this was reversed following Japan's defeat and the pre-war border restored in 1946.

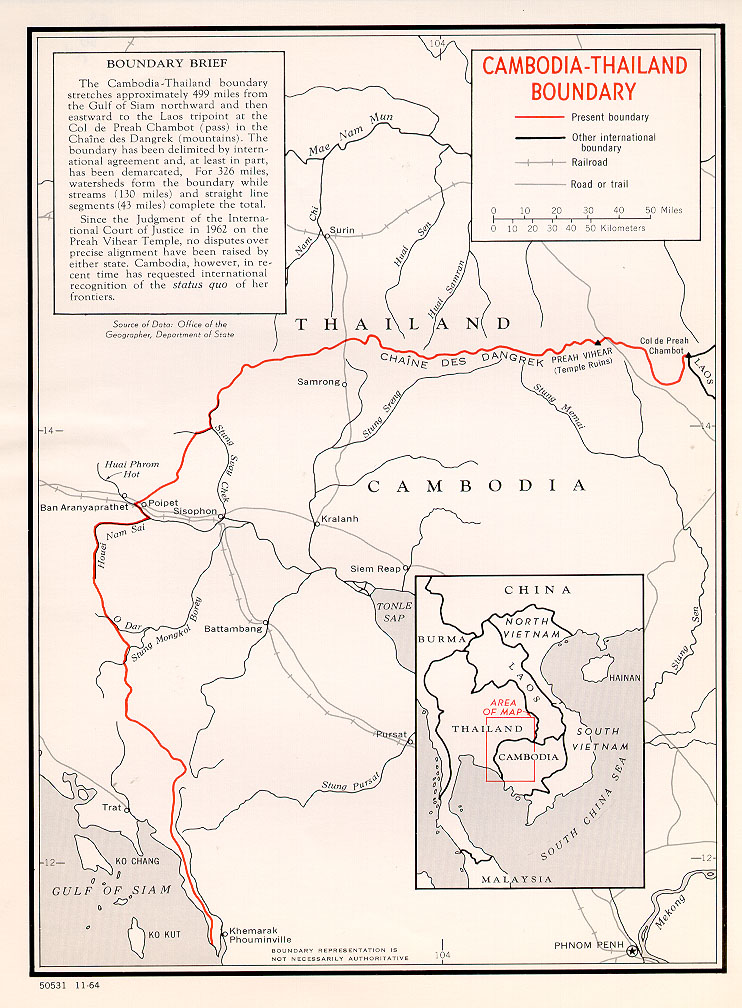
Map of the Cambodia-Thailand border

=== Since Cambodian independence ===
Cambodia gained independence in 1953, and since then the two states have had a fractious relationship. A Cambodian–Thai border dispute arose in the late 1950s over the ownership of Preah Vihear, a temple in the Dângrêk Mountains, adjacent to the border. In 1962 the case was referred to the International Court of Justice, which ruled in favour of Cambodia, however Thailand expressed reservations as to the outcome. The mid-1960s also saw a dispute over ownership of Ko Kut island. These disputes faded as Cambodia became engulfed in a series of conflicts in the following decades and the disastrous rule of the Khmer Rouge, with thousands of refugees crossing the border. By 1981, over 250,000 Cambodian and Vietnamese refugees lived in twenty camps along the border, supported by international aid agencies and the United Nations Border Relief Operation.

Sporadic fighting broke out along the border following Vietnam's invasion of Cambodia in 1979 which forced the Khmer Rouge to flee to camps on the border with Thailand, using them as a base throughout the 1980s until Vietnam withdrew from the country in 1989. On 18 February 1994, the Khmer Rouge led by Saloth Sâr (Pol Pot) rebuilt their headquarters at Dângrêk Mountains located in Anlong Veng near the Thai border, which became the final hideout inside the dense jungle. In an effort to stop Khmer Rouge infiltration from Thailand, Cambodia built a large fortified fence along the border in the second half of the 1980s.

Since the advent of peace in Cambodia in the early 1990s relations with Thailand have once again soured over the Preah Vihear issue, as well as, to a lesser extent, Ko Kut island. A border commission was set up in 1995 in an attempt to settle the issues peacefully, however by 2013 it had made little progress and a full border demarcation satisfactory to both sides remained outstanding.

Armed fighting broke out at various times from 2008 to 2011. As of September 2022, government officials said border demarcation had been completed in 13 areas, and that the remaining 11 were under negotiation.

On 28 May 2025, one Royal Cambodian Army soldier was killed after a Thai patrol encountered Cambodian soldiers digging trenches. Both Cambodia and Thailand accused the other of trespassing on their respective territories and firing first. Phumtham Wechayachai, Thailand's Defense Minister, claimed that opening fire was not intended on both sides. Cambodia stated that it will litigate the dispute with the International Court of Justice.

In July 2025, the conflict was reignited with both sides' military attacking each other. Thailand also sealed all land border crossings with Cambodia. Multiple civilians were reported to be killed. On 24 July 2025, Cambodian Prime Minister Hun Manet submitted a request to the United Nations Security Council to call for an urgent meeting to stop Thai aggression. The UNSC held the meeting on 25 July 2025. With mediation effort from 2025 ASEAN Chair country Malaysia, as well as call for a ceasefire from U.S. President Donald Trump to both countries, Hun Manet and Thailand Acting Prime Minister Phumtham Wechayachai met in Kuala Lumpur for peace talks on 28 July 2025. Both countries agreed on an immediate and unconditional ceasefire taking effect on 12:00 on 29 July 2025. On 8 December 2025, after both countries reported violations of the ceasefire, fighting across the border resumed until another ceasefire agreement was signed on 27 December.

== Border crossings ==
As of 2019, there were seven permanent border crossings, one temporary border crossing, nine checkpoints for border trade and one checkpoint for tourism which is currently closed.

=== Permanent border crossings ===
No	Cambodia		Thailand			Notes
No	Road	Border post	Road	Border post	Opening hours	Notes
1	66	Choam, Anlong Veng District, Oddar Meanchey	2201	Chong Sa-ngam, Phu Sing District, Sisaket	0700–2000	
2	68	O Smach, Samraong Municipality, Oddar Meanchey	214	Chong Chom, Kap Choeng District, Surin	0600–2200	
3	5	Poipet, Poipet Municipality, Banteay Meanchey	33	Ban Klong Luk, Aranyaprathet District, Sa Kaeo	0600–2200	Road and railway checkpoint. Rail: Rail link between Ban Klong Luk Border railway station and Poipet railway station reopened in April 2019, but services are currently suspended due to COVID-19.
4	57B	Phnom Dei, Sampov Loun District, Battambang	4058	Ban Khao Din, Khlong Hat District, Sa Kaeo	0600–2200	
5	57B-1	Phnom Proek Border Crossing Station, Pech Chenda, Phnum Proek district, Battambang	3405	Thung Khanan, Soi Dao district, Chanthaburi		
6	4033	Kamrieng International Border Checkpoint, Kamrieng District, Battambang	4033	Ban Laem Border Checkpoint, Pong Nam Ron District, Chanthaburi	0600–2200	
7	57	Phsar Prum, Sala Krau District, Pailin	Khlong Yai- Mueang Prum Road	Ban Pakkad, Pong Nam Ron District, Chanthaburi	0600–2200	
8	48	Cham Yeam, Mondol Seima District, Koh Kong	3	Khlong Yai Immigration Checkpoint, Ban Hat Lek, Khlong Yai District, Trat	0600–2200	

=== Temporary border crossing ===
One temporary border crossing exists for the construction of the Thai-Cambodia Friendship Bridge only, which will become a permanent border crossing in the future.

No	Cambodia	Thailand		Notes
No	Border post	Border post	Opening hours	Notes
1	Stueng Bat, Poipet Municipality, Banteay Meanchey	Ban Nong Ian, Aranyaprathet District, Sa Kaeo	–	Under Construction. Border crossing across the new Thai-Cambodia Friendship Bridge.

=== Checkpoints for border trade ===
There are 9 checkpoints officially recognized by the Ministry of Interior which are open for cross-border local trade only, located in Ubon Ratchathani, Buriram, Sa Kaeo, Chanthaburi and Trat provinces. Entering the opposite country beyond these checkpoints and their associated markets is illegal.

=== Checkpoint for tourism ===
There is one checkpoint for tourism, which is currently closed since June 2008 due to the Preah Vihear dispute and eventual cession of Preah Vihear to Cambodia.

No	Cambodia	Thailand		Notes
No	Border post	Border post	Opening hours	Notes
1	Preah Vihear temple, Choam Khsant District, Preah Vihear	Pha Mo I Daeng, Kantharalak District, Sisaket	–	Checkpoint closed.

== See also ==
- Cambodia–Thailand relations
- 2008–2013 Cambodian–Thai border crisis
- 2025 Cambodia–Thailand border conflict
- Cambodian humanitarian crisis
- Vietnamese border raids in Thailand
- Indochina refugee crisis
- Nong Chan Refugee Camp
- Nong Samet Refugee Camp
- Sa Kaeo Refugee Camp
- Site Two Refugee Camp
- Khao-I-Dang
