= Phnum Proek =

Phnum Proek may refer to:

- Phnum Proek District
- Phnum Proek (commune)
