= Stung Battambang 1 Dam =

Dam in Battambang, Cambodia

Stung Battambang 1 Hydropower Dam
- Official name: Stung Battambang 1 Hydropower Dam
- Location: East of Pailin District, Battambang Province, Cambodia
- Opening date: 2014
- Owner: Unknown Korean company

Dam and spillways
- Type of dam: Earth core rockfill dam
- Impounds: Battambang River
- Height: 38 m (125 ft)

Reservoir
- Creates: Stung Battambang 1 Hydropower Dam Reservoir
- Catchment area: 45 km^{2} (17 sq mi)

Power Station
- Installed capacity: 24 MW (32,000 hp)
- Annual generation: 120 GWh (430 TJ)

The Stung Battambang 1 (or Battambang 1) is a dam planned for construction on the Battambang River in Cambodia. The river is a major tributary of the Tonlé Sap. Of the two dams planned for this river, the larger is the Stung Battambang 1. A letter of commitment has been issued by the Cambodian authorities for a pre-feasibility study of the dam by an unknown Korean company

Surrounding the dam site is the Bannan Irrigation project, covering some 20,000 hectares (49,000 acres), and the dam is understood to play a role in the irrigation of this area, as well as generating hydropower. There is little data available about reservoir size or number of people who will be displaced. The dam is one of three possible dams in the Battambang River basin; the other two would block two tributaries to the Battambang River: the Mongkol Borey River and the Sangker River.

== See also ==
- Mekong
- Mekong River Commission
- Battambang River
