= Prek Toal =

Protected area in Cambodia

- Location within Cambodia
- Location: Battambang Province
- Nearest city: Siem Reap
- Coordinates: 13°13.907′N 103°39.497′E
- Area: 42,000 ha (100,000 acres)
- Governing body: Cambodian Ministry of Environment

Ramsar Wetland
- Official name: Prek Toal Ramsar Site
- Designated: 2 October 2015
- Reference no.: 2245

Prek Toal is a bird sanctuary and Ramsar site located within the Tonlé Sap Biosphere Reserve, at the north-west corner of the Tonlé Sap. It is a popular area for ecotourism and birdwatching given the area's rich biodiversity and rare waterbirds, particularly abundant during the dry season.
