= Krang Ponley River =

River in Cambodia

Krang Ponley River (Stoeng Krang Ponley, Stung Krang Ponley; Khmer: ស្ទឹងក្រាំងពន្លៃ) is a river of Cambodia. A tributary of the Tonlé Sap, it flows for 89.37 kilometres (55.53 mi).

== See also ==
- List of rivers of Cambodia
