= Sangkae River =

Sangkae River ស្ទឹងសង្កែ
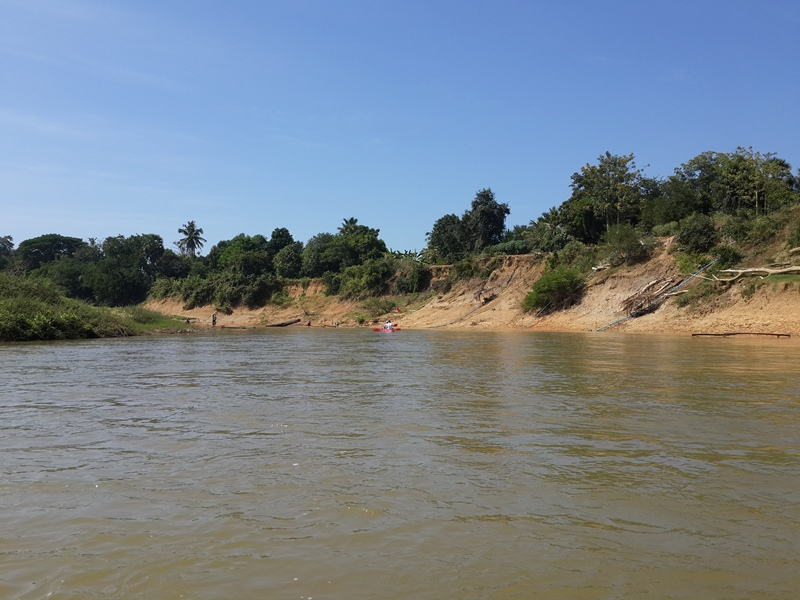

Location
- Country: Cambodia
- Province: Battambang

Physical characteristics
- Length: 250 km (160 mi)

The Sangkae River (Khmer: ស្ទឹងសង្កែ, Stung Sangkae; also spelled Stung Sangké or Stung Sangkhae) is one of the main rivers in Battambang Province in north western Cambodia. The Sangkae River is approximately 250 kilometres (160 mi) long. It flows through 6 districts and 27 communes in Battambang province before draining into the Tonlé Sap lake.

The average depth of the river, based on raw data provided by the Battambang's Department of Water Resource (2013) is during the dry season 2.35 metres (7.7 ft) and during the wet season 6.79 metres (22.3 ft).

== Geography ==
The Sangkae river flows through several villages and towns in the province, the most important one being Battambang city.

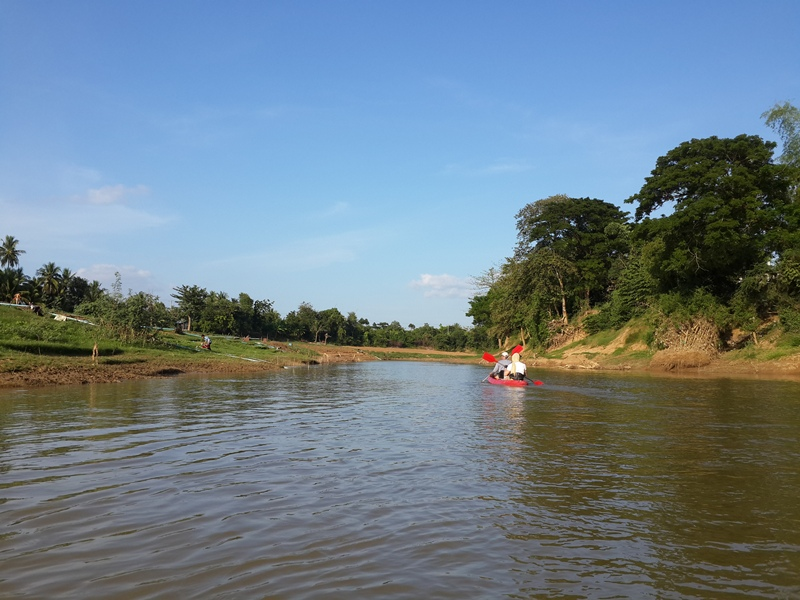
Sangkae river

The river splits in two branches at the level of Khwaeng pagoda, 5 km (3.1 mi) south of Battambang city centre. The smaller fork river flows through Sangkae village, 6 km (3.73 mi) east of Battambang city centre, giving its name to Sangkae District. The main branch of the river reaches the Tonlé Sap floodplain around 5 km (3.1 mi) downstream of Preak Trob village, and merges with Serei Sophorn river, in Prey Chas. The two river branches merge again in Thvang village.

The river finally reaches the Tonlé Sap lake through the western Tonlé Sap Biosphere Reserve, near Prek Toal.

== Economy ==
=== Fishery ===
The river provides access to the Tonlé Sap lake, as well as fishery resources for local people. The fishing techniques used by locals include the use of fish traps placed on the river banks, as well as fishing nets.

=== Industry ===
The Seksak Hydropower plant is located on the river near Traeng, approximately 45 km (28 mi) south-west of Battambang city. The dam forms an artificial lake that hosts a tourism resort. However, in 2015, the lake level rise due to the dam was considered a menace to the touristic activities by local people.

== Ecology ==
=== Fishery ban ===
Industrial fishing is usually banned during the peak of the wet season (June to October), as it is the spawning season.

=== Pollution ===
Several industrial sites are located along the Sangkae river. Some of the plants can pose a threat to the river ecosystems.

In 2021, the province authorities investigated the potential chemical pollution of the river, after dead fish were found downstream.

In 2023, a company was fined $500,000 for disposing liquid waste in the river. Another company had a chemical waste leakage the same year, the Provincial Administration declared on August 4th.

== Transport ==
A ferry line connects Battambang city to Siem Reap, via the Sangkae river and the Tonle Sap Lake. The trip takes between 5 and 6 hours.
