= Chakrei =

Former commune in Battambang Province, Cambodia

Coordinates: 13°20′N 102°21′E

Chakrei ឃុំចក្រី
- Commune
- Interactive map of Chakrei
- Country: Cambodia
- Province: Battambang Province
- District: Phnum Proek District
- Villages: 11
- Time zone: UTC+07

Chakrei (Khmer: ឃុំចក្រី) was a khum (commune) of Phnum Proek District in Battambang Province in north-western Cambodia.

It was the seat of Phnum Proek District.

Chakrei Commune had been renamed to Bour Commune according to the sub-decree no. 153 អនក្រ.បក dated July 7, 2011 by splitting the following 4 villages into Barang Thleak Commune of the same district.

- Hong Tuek
- Chakrei
- Tuol
- Chamkar Trab

== Villages ==
- Tuol
- Chamkar Trab
- Hong Tuek
- Chakrei
- Damnakksan
- Ouda
- Phnomprampi
- Bou
- Anlongkrouch
- AnlongsIþ
- Spantomnab
