= Reuben Kee =

Singaporean dragon boat paddler

- Born: Reuben Kee En Rui; 9 July 1984; Singapore
- Died: 23 November 2007 (aged 23); Cambodia
- Occupations: Athlete, part-time model, musician
- Parent(s): Freddie Kee Thiam Hock (father), Patsy Kee (mother)
- Relatives: Shimona Kee En Ci (sister)
- Modeling information
- Height: 184 cm (6 ft 0 in)
- Hair color: Brown
- Eye color: Brown
- Website: Pathos: Home to Reuben Kee's music

Reuben Kee En Rui (simplified Chinese: 纪恩锐; traditional Chinese: 紀恩鋭; pinyin: Ji En Rui; 9 July 1984 – 23 November 2007) was a Singaporean dragon-boat paddler, composer and part-time model. He was also known for contributions within the M.U.G.E.N community. As a musician, he released remixes of video game music and was a member of OverClocked ReMix. He was fluent in Chinese and English.

== Early life ==
Kee was born to Freddie Kee Thiam Hock 紀添福, and mother, Patsy Kee. He was the youngest of two children, with an elder sister, Shimona Kee En Ci. His name is commonly seen shortened to just "Reu".

== Career ==
=== Music ===
Drawn to music which he heard in video games, Kee developed his own arrangements and variations based on them.

Furthering his skills as a self-taught pianist throughout the years, he was given the opportunity to be President of the Piano Ensemble at Nanyang Polytechnic, venturing into composing a variety of music including orchestra, electronic, rock, jazz, hip hop, techno and many other genres. He presented some of his musical work through his site on occasion, the majority of which lied in remixes of video game music.

Kee also joined Yamaha's Magic Fingers 2003 contest and made through the quarter and semi-finals to make it into the finals and top 8.

During that same year, Kee was also involved in composing and arranging the soundtrack of a project mod for the Operation Flashpoint engine for the Singapore Armed Forces and public awareness. The project was developed by Kee's university, Nanyang Polytechnic, and later submitted to the 2007 Independent Games Festival's Mod Competition.

In 2005 Kee collaborated with Jillian Aversa on a piano rendition of a song composed by Yasunori Mitsuda.

His father stated of him regarding his music that "he was a very responsible boy. I don't spoil my children, his keyboard was the most expensive thing I had ever bought him. He made good use of it, teaching himself how to play and giving other people lessons as well,"

In an e-mail sent to The Straits Times by the artistic director of theatrical group Act 3 International, Ruby Lim-Yang, Reu was cited as a gifted composer. Kee had assisted Yang on a children's musical in the past.

On 19 January 2007, Kee completed the soundtrack for the film "To Speak", a movie based on the true story of Ratana, a 12-year-old Cambodian girl living in an impoverished rural village. The original soundtrack was Reuben's first venture into the film industry.

=== Modelling ===
As a part-time model, Kee became a 1st runner-up and the winner of Mr. Physique in Mr. Singapore World 2006 pageant. The year after, Kee was Singapore's contestant at the Mister World 2007 Male Pageant which was held on 31 March 2007 in the tropical island of Sanya.

=== Athletic and educational activities ===
Reu involved himself in several athletic activities including sprint kayaking and dragon boat racing. Kee was also a member of Singapore National Dragon Boat team, and competed in several events.

On weekends, he taught disabled children how to swim.

Reu served a role as the head prefect of San Yu Adventist School, and was also the co-captain of Polytechnic's dragon boat team, overlooking 50 juniors. Said juniors went on to state they saw him as a role model. According to Ivan Ho, Polytechnic's sports facilities officer, he was a dynamic leader that "always gave 110 percent", and went on to point out he was both well-liked and the designer of the team's T-shirt logo.

=== Online contributions ===
As part of the M.U.G.E.N community, Reu was the creator of the "Evil Duo" – Evil Ryu and Evil Ken, characters that lured many people into exploring the capabilities and uses of M.U.G.E.N as far as edited and original content goes, and at the same time inspired many others to make several renditions (as well as copies) of the 'Evil' concept.

Most notably, Reu also conceived the original concept of the M.U.G.E.N character Dragon Claw, which was modelled in 3D and then rendered in 2D, with a flair for highly cinematic combos. His advanced graphics, as well as the fact that it is entirely original (as all the work was made from scratch by Reuben), place it in a small category of M.U.G.E.N works, as the majority are from edited commercial games. Dragon Claw, being completely copyrighted by Reuben Kee, is also one of the first merchandised characters, having shirts and even a coffee mug manufactured for the purpose of selling them.

Reu was also active in the video game music arrangement community, contributing on OC ReMix and VGMix as well as distributing music through his personal website. Many of his pieces featured his talents on the piano.

== Death ==
Kee died on 23 November 2007 as the result of a boating accident that claimed the lives of several contestants, including four of his teammates in the 2007 Cambodia Tonlé Sap competition.
