= Bour (commune) =

Coordinates: 13°20′N 102°21′E

Bour ឃុំបួរ
- Commune
- Interactive map of Bour
- Country: Cambodia
- Province: Battambang Province
- District: Phnum Proek District
- Villages: 9
- Time zone: UTC+07

Bour (Khmer: ឃុំបួរ) is a khum (commune) of Phnum Proek District in Battambang Province in north-western Cambodia.

Bour was renamed from Chakrei Commune according to the sub-decree no. 153 អនក្រ.បក dated July 7, 2011 by splitting the following 4 villages into Barang Thleak Commune.

- Hong Tuek
- Chakrei
- Tuol
- Chamkar Trab

== Villages ==
	Code	Village	Khmer
1	02110305	Damnak Beng	ដំណាក់បេង
2	02110306	Dom Nakksan	ដំណាក់ក្សាន្ត
3	02110307	Oda	អូរដា
4	02110308	Phnom 7	ភ្នំប្រាំពីរ,ភូមិមាត់ដាច
5	02110309	Bour	បួរ
6	02110310	Anlung Kroch	អន្លង់ក្រូច
7	02110311	Anlung Sdei	អន្លង់ស្តី
8	02110312	Spean Tomneab	ស្ពានទំនាប
9	02110313	Bos SaOm	បុស្សស្អំ
