= Pheas River =

River in Cambodia

Pheas River (Stung Pheas, spelled also Stoĕng Pheas) is a river in Cambodia. It is a major tributary of the Tonlé Sap.
