= Boribo River =

River in Cambodia

Boribo River (Stoeng Boribo; Khmer: ស្ទឹងបរិបូរ) is a river in Cambodia. It rises in the Aural mountains in Pursat and crosses Baribour District in Kampong Chhnang Province before entering the Tonlé Sap lake. It is a major tributary of the Tonlé Sap (commonly translated as "Great Lake").
