= Nanyang Polytechnic =

Singapore post-secondary school founded 1992

Coordinates: 1°22′48″N 103°50′56″E

- 南洋理工學院 (Chinese); Politeknik Nanyang (Malay) நன்யாங் பல்தொழில்நுட்பவியல் பள்ளி (Tamil)
- Motto: The Innovative Polytechnic
- Type: Public; Government
- Established: 1 April 1992; 34 years ago
- Principal: Russell Chan
- Total staff: 1349
- Students: 12,787(2025)
- Location: 180 Ang Mo Kio Avenue 8, Singapore 569830
- Campus: 30 hectares (74 acres)
- Website: nyp.edu.sg
- Nanyang Polytechnic

Agency overview
- Jurisdiction: Government of Singapore
- Parent agency: Ministry of Education

Nanyang Polytechnic (NYP), is a post-secondary education institution and statutory board under the purview of the Ministry of Education in Ang Mo Kio, Singapore.

== History ==
NYP was established in 1992.

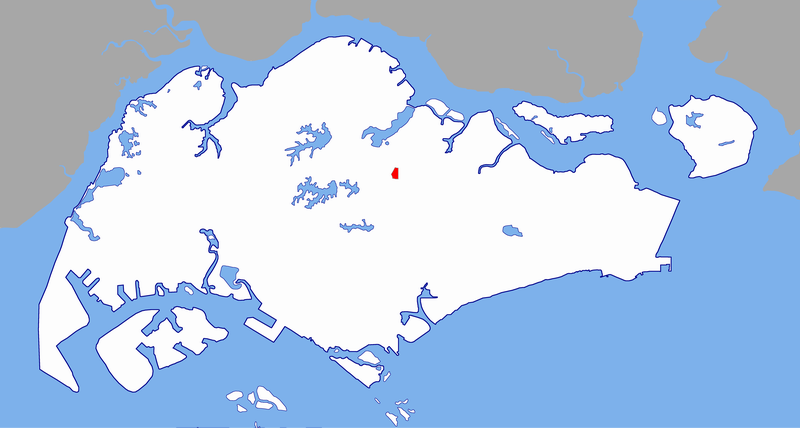
Location of NYP

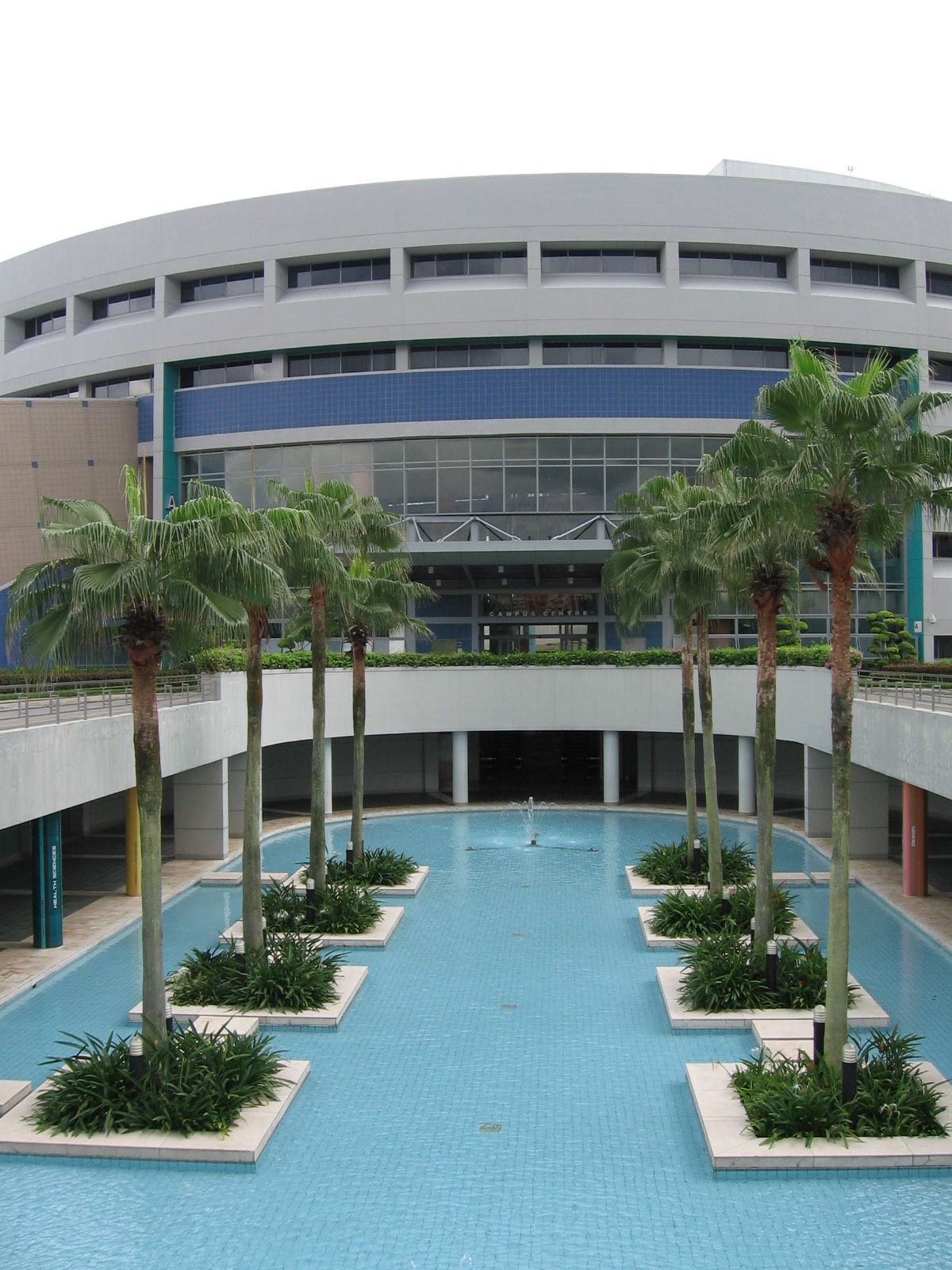
Campus Centre

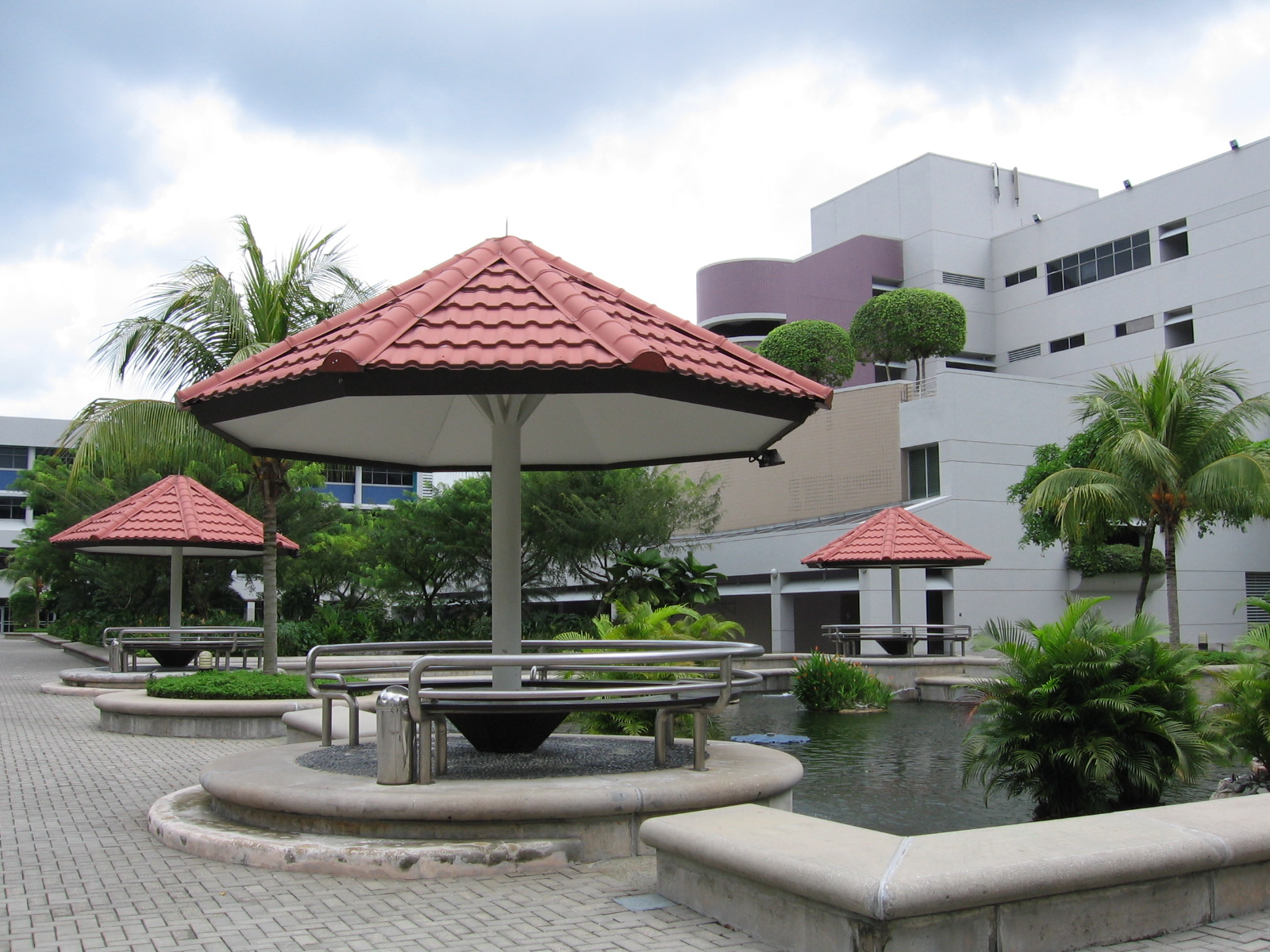

== Recognition ==
Nanyang Polytechnic has won several awards and recognitions. These include:

- Public Service Achievement Award (2010)
- SHRI Leading HR Practices in E-Human Resource Management Award (2009)
- Hewitt Best Employer Award (2009)
- BCA Green Mark Platinum rating (2022)

== Notable alumni ==
=== Entertainment ===
- Romeo Tan, Mediacorp actor
- Carrie Wong, Mediacorp actress
- Chantalle Ng, Mediacorp actress
- Hossan Leong, Singaporean actor
- Vanessa Peh, Miss Singapore World 2018
- Anupama Aura Gurung, Miss Nepal Earth 2011

=== Sports ===
- Hariss Harun, footballer and captain of the Singapore national team
- Lionel Lewis, former Singapore national team footballer
- Helena Wong, Singaporean weightlifter
- Reuben Kee, Singaporean dragon boat paddler
