= Sreng River =

River in Cambodia

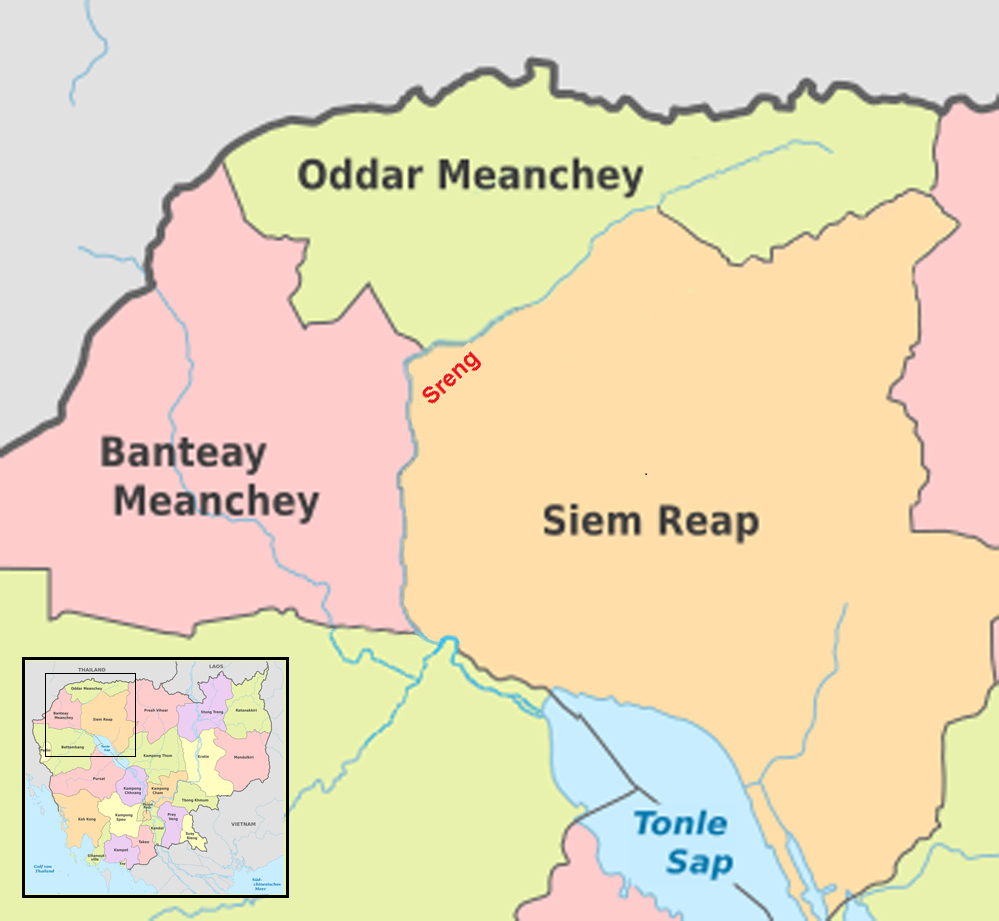
Location of Sreng River in Cambodia

The Stung Sreng River (also spelled Stoeng Sreng; Khmer: ស្ទឹងស្រែង) is situated in north-western Cambodia. Its source lies in the southern slopes of the Dangrek Mountains and after traversing through three provinces - Oddar Meanchey province, Siem Reap province and Banteay Meanchey it drains into the Sangkae River. The stream is subject to the Stung Sreng Water Resource Development Project. Once completed, the river is going to supply 25,000 hectares of farmland with water during the rainy season and 3,750 hectares during the dry season in several local districts of the above-mentioned provinces and flooding along the river will be prevented.
