= Ou Rumduol =

Ou Rumduol ឃុំអូររំដួល
- Commune
- Location within Cambodia
- Coordinates: 13°15′39″N 102°33′24″E
- Country: Cambodia
- Province: Battambang Province
- District: Phnum Proek District
- Villages: 8
- Time zone: UTC+07
- Geocode: 021105

Ou Rumduol is a khum (commune) of Phnum Proek District in Battambang Province in north-western Cambodia.

== Villages ==
Villages in this area include:

| Village code | Name | Khmer |
|---|---|---|
| 02110501 | Samraong | សំរោង |
| 02110502 | Ou Rumduol | អូររំដួល |
| 02110503 | Ou Prayut | អូរប្រយុទ្ធ |
| 02110504 | Kandal | កណ្តាល |
| 02110505 | Thnal Bot | ថ្នល់បត់ |
| 02110506 | Ou Lhong | អូរល្ហុង |
| 02110507 | Krus Kraham | គ្រួសក្រហម |
| 02110508 | Dei Laor | ដីល្អ |
