= Phnum Proek (commune) =

Coordinates: 13°16′N 102°21′E

Phnum Proek ឃុំភ្នំព្រឹក
- Commune
- Interactive map of Phnum Proek
- Country: Cambodia
- Province: Battambang Province
- District: Phnum Proek District
- Villages: 5
- Time zone: UTC+07

Phnum Proek is a khum (commune) of Phnum Proek District in Battambang Province in north-western Cambodia.

It is the seat of Phnum Proek District.

== Villages ==
កូដភូមិ	ភូមិ	ជាអក្សរឡាតាំង
02110101	ទួលខ្ពស់	Tuol Khpos
02110102	បេងស្អាត	Beng Sat
02110103	ភ្នំព្រឹក	Phnum Proek
02110104	ស្រឡៅ	Sralau
02110105	គគីរ	Kokir
