= 2007 Tonlé Sap dragon boat accident =

Dragon boat accident in Tonlé Sap, Cambodia

- Victims of the accident. (L–R) Chee Wei Cheng, Jeremy Goh, Reuben Kee, Stephen Loh, and Poh Boon San
- Date: 23 November 2007
- Location: Tonlé Sap, Cambodia
- Cause: collision with a pontoon
- Deaths: 5
- Injuries: 17

On 23 November 2007, a 22-member Singapore national dragon boat team capsized after colliding with a pontoon in Tonlé Sap, Cambodia, leading to the deaths of five Singaporean dragon boat paddlers after they were sucked under the pontoon by strong water currents.

They were participating in Bon Om Touk, an annual Cambodian festival. The five Singaporeans were found on 25 November floating downstream towards Phnom Penh. They were later identified by relatives and brought to Calmette Hospital.

== Background ==
The Singapore national dragon boat team had arrived in Cambodia on the morning of 23 November, the first time that Singapore had participated in the Bon Om Touk, where the Tonlé Sap River reverses in its water flow towards the lake. Before beginning, the Singapore team noticed that the currents were stronger that day and that the water was dirty. The Singapore team also decided to not wear lifejackets as it would have allowed them to "paddle faster".

== Incident ==
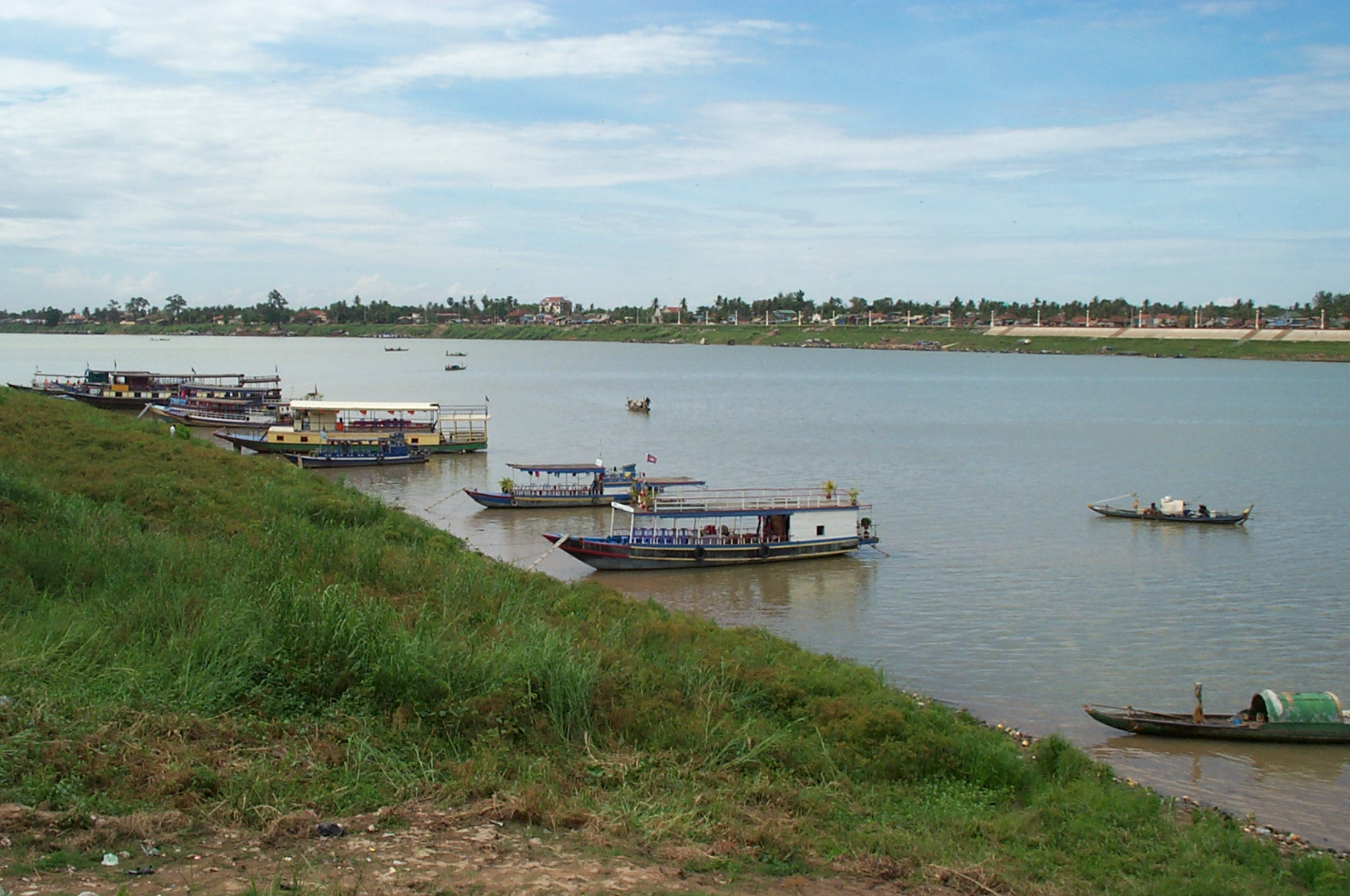
Tonlé Sap River where the incident occurred, pictured in 2003

On 23 November, after the race, the Singapore team was being brought back to shore by a safety vessel. However, after seeing other teams paddle back to shore, opted to paddle back themselves to practice and get a better feel of the water conditions.

Upon reaching the pontoon, they slowly navigated the 50m gap between the two pontoons and began angling the boat halfway to turn into the docking point, however, a sudden shift in direction caused the dragon boat to capsize sideways and all 22 dragon boat paddlers and the boat were sucked underneath the pontoon by strong currents. Out of the 22, only 17 paddlers could be recovered.

=== Search efforts ===
Soon after, the first responders were eight divers and five boats from a speedboat workshop near Chroy Changvar Bridge. Nhim Vanda, Head of Cambodia's Disaster Management Agency, was called on by then-Prime Minister of Cambodia Hun Sen to aid in the search efforts.

On 24 November, the search party had grown to 400 people—Cambodian police, navy, and fishermen. 3 million riel was offered to find the paddlers and the search was widened to the whole venue of the festival. By midday, they tried attaching fishing nets to the bottom of search boats in an attempt to pick up the paddlers. At about 3 p.m., Singapore sent a 8-man Naval Diving Unit team to aid in the search.

On 25 November, Indonesia, Thailand, and the Philippines offered to help in the search efforts. After replacing the fishing nets with metal hooks, they found the first body at Koh Pich at 8 a.m. and two more bodies soon after, 40 hours after the incident. The final two bodies resurfaced on their own.

=== Victims ===
The victims are as follows.

- Chee Wei Cheng, 20
- Jeremy Goh, 24
- Stephen Loh, 31
- Poh Boon San, 27
- Reuben Kee, 23

== Aftermath ==
The bodies were later brought to Calmette Hospital where they were cleaned and treated by traditions from the Embassy of Singapore in Cambodia. On 28 November, the Singapore Dragon Boat Association made wearing lifejackets mandatory for all dragon boat paddlers. On 29 November, a memorial service was held for the 5 paddlers at Mandai Crematorium and a speech was given by the captain of the dragon boat Yeo Chin Hwei. Then-Minister for Community Development and Sports Vivian Balakrishnan attended the memorial service.

Then-Cambodia Prime Minister Hun Sen expressed condolences to his Singaporean counterpart, then-Singapore Prime Minister Lee Hsien Loong. In December, an inquiry panel was launched to investigate the dragon boat incident. In 2008, the inquiry panel stated that a combination of factors such as the paddler's unfamiliarity of the race venue, the low safety awareness, and the lack of preparation may have led to the accident.

In 2008, two survivors of the accident, Alex Loh Kar Meng and Xie Jiaqi, launched a bursary at Nanyang Technological University called the Poh Boon San and Stephen Loh Soon Ann NTU Dragon Boat Endowed Bursary Fund. In 2023, the Singapore dragon boat team made its return to Cambodia, 16 years after the accident, to participate in the 2023 SEA Games.

== See also ==
- 2010 Penang dragon boat tragedy
- 2011 Præstø Fjord dragon boat accident
