= Stoung River =

River in Cambodia

Stoung River (Stung Stoung, spelled also Stoĕng Stoung; Khmer: ស្ទឹងស្ទោង) is a river in Cambodia. It is a major tributary of the Tonlé Sap.
