= Svay Chek River =

River in Cambodia

Svay Chek River (Stung Svay Chek, spelled also Stoĕng Svay Chek; Khmer: ស្ទឹងស្វាយចេក) is a river in north-west Cambodia. It drains into Tonlé Sap lake. Stoĕng Svay Chek has a basin area of 1,249 km^{2} in Cambodia (total 2,104 km^{2}), average runoff 3,464 m^{3}/s.
