= Battambang River =

River in Cambodia

Battambang River (Khmer: ស្ទឹងបាត់ដំបង, Steung Battambang, also spelled Stoĕng Battambang) is a river in Cambodia. It is a major tributary of the Tonlé Sap.
