= Pech Chenda =

Coordinates: 13°13′N 102°23′E

Phum Snoul ឃុំពេជ្រចិន្តា
- Commune
- Interactive map of Phum Snoul
- Country: Cambodia
- Province: Battambang Province
- District: Phnum Proek District
- Villages: 3
- Time zone: UTC+07

Pech Chenda is a khum (commune) of Phnum Proek district in the Battambang province in north-western Cambodia.

== Villages ==
Code	Village
02110201	ដូង (Ou)
02110202	តូច (Phnum Touch)
02110204	ពេជ្រចិន្តា (Pech Chenda)
