= Barang Thleak =

Coordinates: 13°21′N 102°21′E

Barang Thleak ឃុំបារាំងធ្លាក់
- Commune
- Interactive map of Barang Thleak
- Country: Cambodia
- Province: Battambang Province
- District: Phnum Proek District
- Villages: 6
- Time zone: UTC+07

Barang Thleak (Khmer: ឃុំបារាំងធ្លាក់) is a khum (commune) of Phnum Proek District in Battambang Province in north-western Cambodia.

== Villages ==
កូដភូមិ	ភូមិ	ជាអក្សរឡាតាំង
02110401	ទួលជ្រៃ	Tuol Chrey
02110402	អូរចោត	Ou Choat
02110403	ទួលខ្វាវ	Tuol Khvav
02110404	បាំរាំងធ្លាក់	Barang Thleak
02110405	ចំការស្រូវ	Chamkar Srov
02110406	ដំណាក់អំពិល	Damnak Ampil
