= Sisophon River =

River in Cambodia

Serei Sophorn River (Khmer: ស្ទឹងសិរីសោភ័ណ) is a river that flows through Banteay Meanchey province in Cambodia. It is a major tributary of the Tonlé Sap.
