= Tonle Sap Biosphere Reserve =

Ecological phenomenon in Cambodia

Coordinates: 12.7500°N 103.8300°E

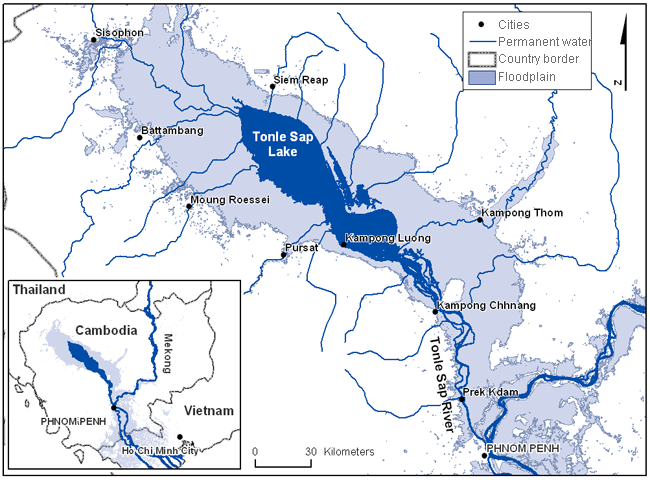
Map of the Tonle Sap lake and surrounding provinces

The Tonle Sap Biosphere Reserve is a unique ecological phenomenon surrounding the Tonle Sap or Great Lake of Cambodia. In 1997, it was successfully nominated as a UNESCO Biosphere Reserve.

== Tonle Sap ==
The lake is linked to the Mekong River by the Tonle Sap River. From November until June the lake flows into the Mekong. However, each year during the rainy season (mid June-late October) the Mekong River is inundated with rain waters. Its lower delta becomes flooded and cannot flow into the sea quickly enough to eliminate all the excess water. This causes the Mekong River to rise enough to reverse the flow of the Tonle Sap River causing it to flow back into the lake. The lake expands from 2500 km^{2} to more than 16,000 km^{2} creating an enormous wetland area. This wetland area supports a tremendous amount of biodiversity including plants, reptiles, mammals, birds and other animals. Many of these are known to be rare or endangered. These wetlands are also an important breeding area for fish from the lake and Mekong River. Both Siamese crocodiles (Crocodylus siamensis) and saltwater crocodiles (Crocodylus porosus) once occurred side-by-side in the lake, and there is thought to be inter-species breeding amongst the crocodiles found in the floating farms on the western part of the Lake in and around Prek Toal.

== Biosphere Reserve ==
In 2001, the Tonle Sap Biosphere Reserve (TSBR) of Cambodia was established by Royal Decree of the government of Cambodia to fulfil 3 key functions. These are:

- a) a conservation function to contribute to the conservation of biological diversity, landscapes, and ecosystem, including genetic resources, plant, fishery and animal species, and to the restoration of the essential character of the environment and habitat of biodiversity;
- b) a development function to foster sustainable development of ecology, environment, economy, society, and culture;
- c) a logistic function to provide support for demonstration projects, environmental education and training, research and monitoring of environment related to the local, national and global issues of conservation and sustainable development.

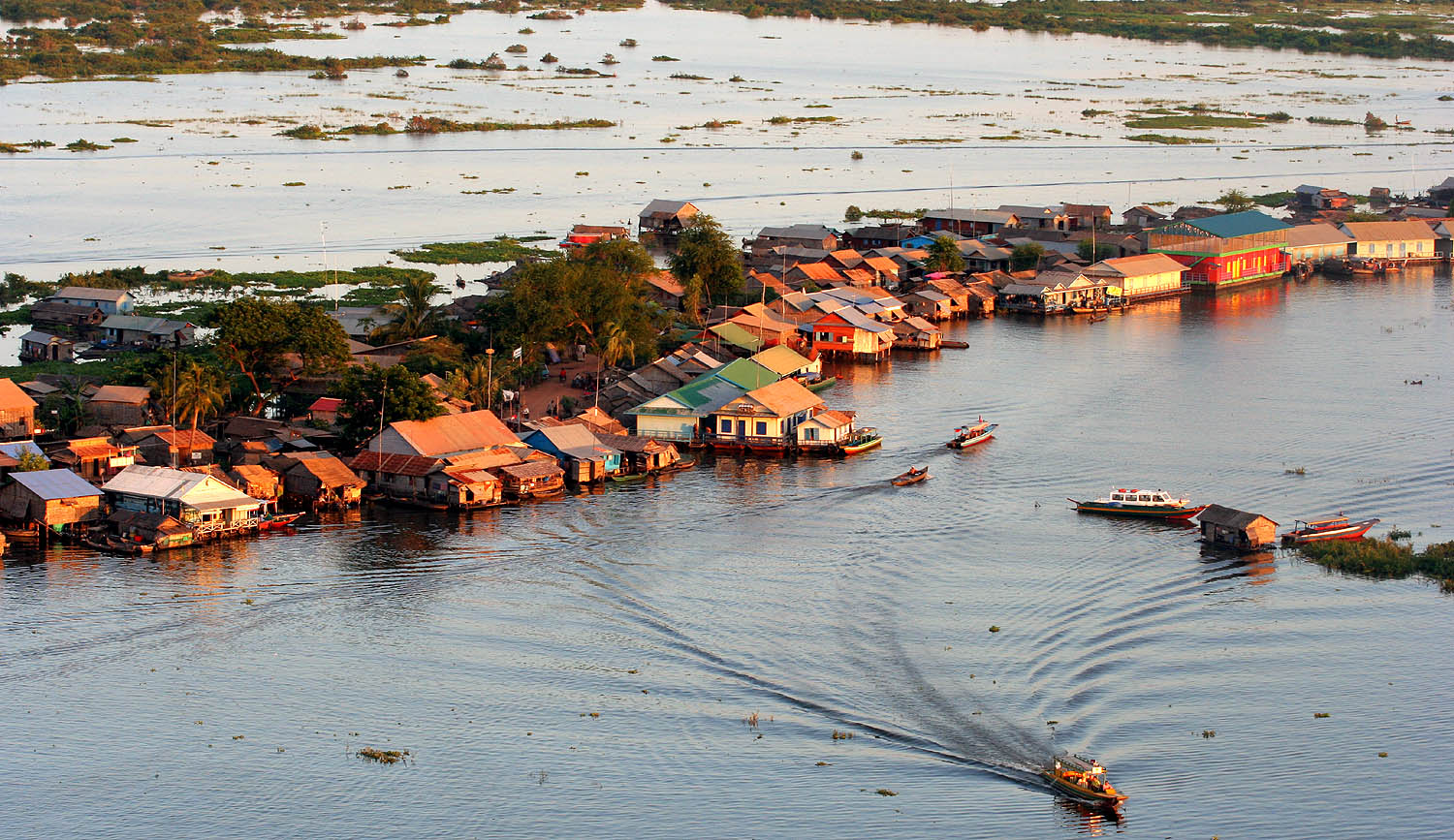
Water dwelling community on the Tonle Sap

The Biosphere has been divided into 3 core areas for protection. These are; Prek Toal in Battambang Province, Boeng Tonle Chhmar in Kampong Thom Province and Stoeng Sen also in Kompong Thom. Boeng Tonle Chhmar has been selected as a Ramsar Convention site, which designates wetlands of international importance. The core areas function similar to national park areas and cover 42,300 ha. including the Great Lake.

Some people still live in these areas and are allowed to fish in them according to fishery law in Cambodia. Illegal fishing and poaching are major problems which threaten the fish population. Cutting of the flooded forest to make room for farming is also a serious issue. Many of the people who live around the lake are extremely poor and depend on it for their livelihoods. It is a challenge for sustainable development and conservation to coexist. It is also of vital importance. During the recent past the number of large fish caught has declined and the poor people who live around the lake are having an even more difficult time providing for themselves and their families. This creates a vicious cycle of increasing poverty, and in turn increasing threats and danger to the lake. This is also why 2 of the functions of the Royal Decree support education and support for the people living around the lake.

== TSBR Secretariat ==
A TSBR Secretariat was established to further the goal of protecting the biosphere and implement and support the functions of the Royal Decree. Since 2003 the Cambodian Government has supported the TSBR Secretariat with funding from the Asian Development Bank (ADB). The major goal of the Secretariat is to develop a coordinated management strategy. Coordinated management is important because different stakeholders have various objectives. For example, farmers build channels to irrigate their fields. However, this leaves less water in fishing areas. Or farmers use pesticides on their crops which can get into the water; then people who live on the lake use this same water for bathing and other household uses and can become sick. This creates conflicts between user groups. The TSBR Secretariat attempts to lower these conflicts and find a solution that provides sustainability for all user groups and protects the biosphere reserve at the same time. The Secretariat is also responsible for developing and maintaining a web based knowledge repository for information about the lake and the biosphere. This website contains over 10,000 textual documents, over 150 tables and over 200 maps all relevant to the biosphere.
