= Phnum Proek district =

Phnum Proek "ភ្នំព្រឹក"
- District (srok)
- Location in Cambodia
- Country: Cambodia
- Province: Battambang
- Communes: 5

Population (1998)
  - Total: 15,355
- Time zone: +7

Phnum Proek (Khmer: ភ្នំព្រឹក) is a district (srok) of Battambang province, in north-western Cambodia.

== Administration ==
The district is subdivided into five communes (khum).

=== Communes and villages ===
Khum (commune)	Phumi (villages)
Phnom Proek	Tuol Khpos, Beng S'at, Phnum Proek, Sralau, Kokir
Pech Chenda	Ou, Phnum Touch, Pech Chenda, Otasokh, Otapun, Snoul, Samaki, Anlong mean
Chakrei	Tuol, Chamkar Trab, Hong Tuek, Chakrei
Barang Thleak	Tuol Chrey, Ou Chhat, Khvav, Barang Thleak, Chamkar Srov, Tuol Ampil
Ou Rumduol	Samraong, Ou Rumduol, Ou Prayut, Kandal, Ou Lhong, Oulahong, Krous Krahom
Bour	Ou Da, Damnak San, Phnom Prampi, Bos S'om, Bour, Anlong Kroch, Anlong Sdey, Damnak Beng, Spean Tomneab, Ou Sbek Breus
