= Tonle Sap =

Lake in Cambodia

- ទន្លេសាប
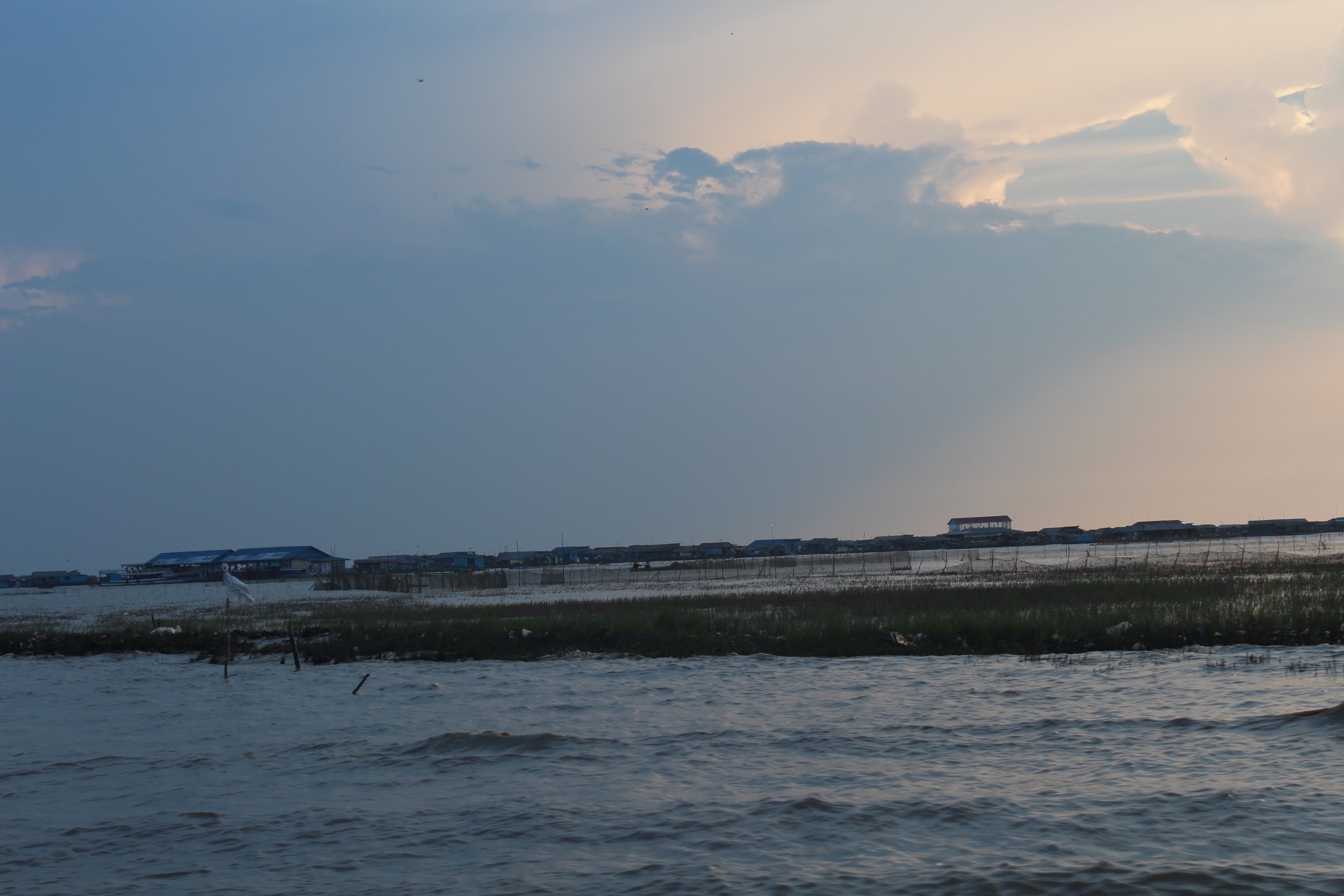

- Location within Cambodia Location within Asia
- Location: Lower Mekong Basin
- Coordinates: 12°53′N 104°04′E
- Type: alluvial
- Primary inflows: Tonle Sap River, Siem Reap River, Pursat River, Sangke River
- Primary outflows: Tonle Sap River
- Basin countries: Cambodia
- Max. length: 250 km (160 mi) (maximum)
- Max. width: 100 km (62 mi)(maximum)
- Surface area: 2,700 km^{2} (1,000 mi^{2}) (minimum); 16,000 km^{2} (6,200 mi^{2}) (maximum)
- Average depth: 1 m (3.3 ft) (minimum)
- Max. depth: 10 m (33 ft)
- Water volume: 80 km^{3} (19 mi^{3}) (maximum)
- Surface elevation: 0.5 m (1 ft 8 in)
- Settlements: Siem Reap, Battambang

Tonle Sap (/ˈtɒnleɪ sæp/; Khmer: ទន្លេសាប, Tǒnle Sap [tɔnleː saːp]; lit. 'Fresh River' or commonly translated as 'Great Lake') is a lake in central Cambodia. Belonging to the Mekong river system, Tonle Sap is the largest freshwater lake in Southeast Asia and one of the most diverse and productive ecosystems in the world. It was designated as a Biosphere Reserve by UNESCO in 1997 due to its high biodiversity. The lake has a large seasonal variation in water depth, with the post-monsoon level sometimes being as much as 10 metres (33 ft) higher than during the monsoons. During the 21st century, the lake and its surrounding ecosystems have come under increasing pressure from deforestation, intensive agriculture and fishery, infrastructure development and climate change.

== Geology ==
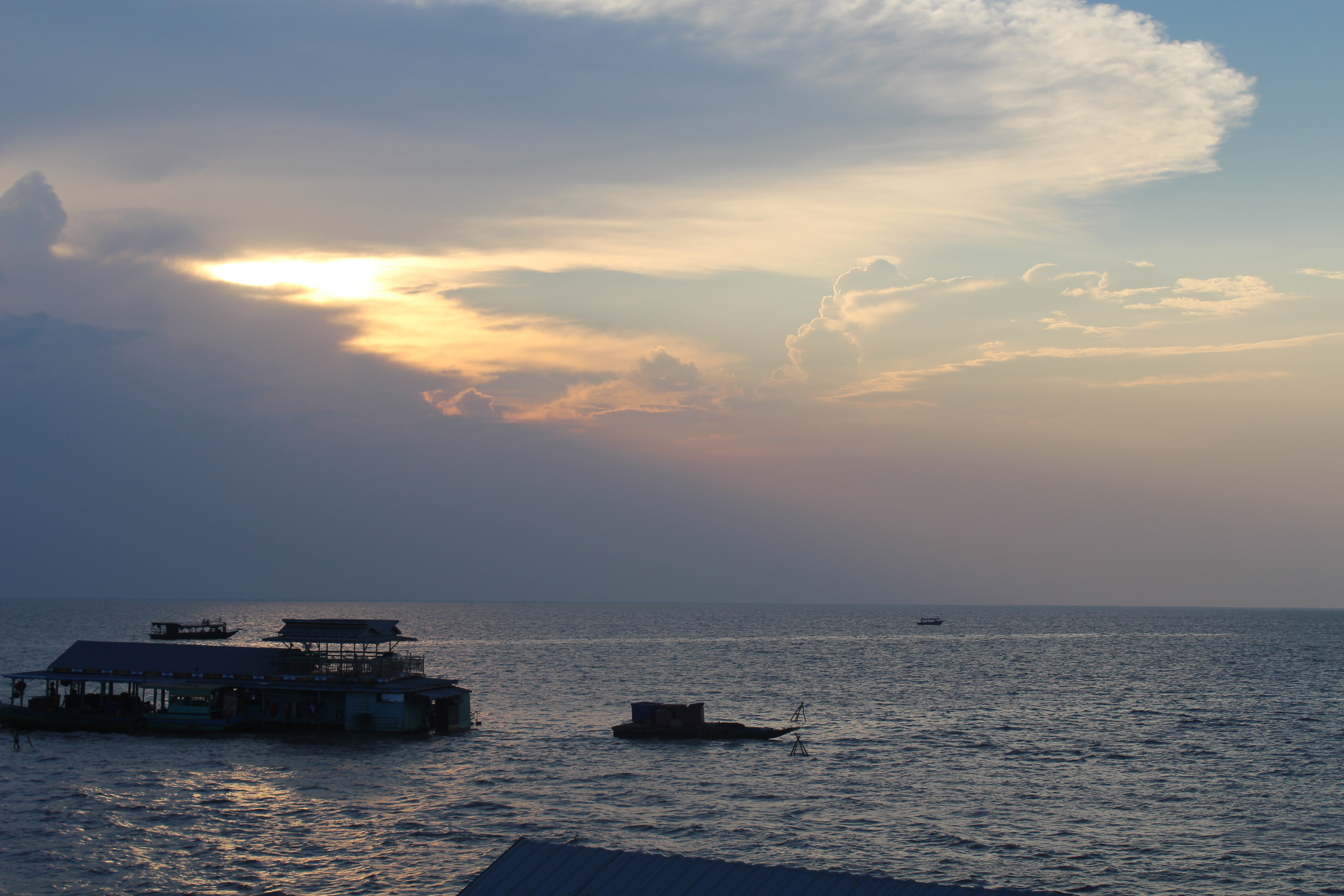
Scenery of the Tonle Sap

Tonle Sap Lake is located in the northwest of the lower Mekong plain, formed by the collision and collapse of the Indian Plate and the Eurasian Plate. The lower Mekong basin rests on an ancient block of continental crust that has remained relatively stable since the Jurassic Period, a period of over 150 million years. Large areas were covered by an inland sea during the upper Mesozoic Era, during which thick red-bed sandstones and evaporites were deposited. The lower Mekong plain used to be a bay, and the sea level rose rapidly at the end of the last glacial period. About 4.5 metres (15 ft) high, cores from this period found near Angkor contain tidal deposits, as well as salt marshes and mangrove swamp deposits, deposited in caves about 7,900–7,300 years ago. The sediments of Tonle Sap also show signs of marine influence. The current river morphology of the Mekong Delta was developed over the past 6,000 years, while the remaining waters in the northwest corner of the lower Mekong plain formed the Tonle Sap.

The Cambodian floodplain is mostly less than 100 meters in elevation, but a few higher outcroppings are scattered throughout the plain and much of northern Cambodia is characterized by rolling and dissected plains between 100 and 200 meters elevation. The plain is the result of erosion and sedimentation. The sediments vary in depth from at least 500 meters near the mouth of the Mekong to only about 30 meters at Phnom Penh, with bedrock outcroppings in isolated hills above the plain in several places.

Hartung & Koeberl (1994) suggest Tonle Sap could be an impact crater left from an impact that had a relatively low angle, and the possible source of the Australasian strewnfield, though this hypothesis has been widely discarded.

== Hydrology ==
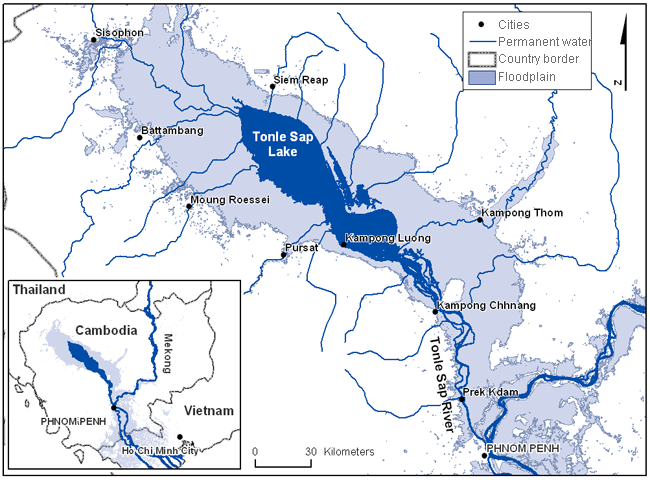
Map of Tonle Sap lake, river, and drainage basin

The Tonle Sap drainage basin is bordered to the southwest by the Cardamom Mountains, with heights of more than 1,700 m (5,600 ft), and to the north are the Piandan Mountains with an average elevation of 500 m (1,600 ft). The basin covers an area of 86,000 km^{2} (33,000 sq mi). The 120 km (75 mi) long Tonle Sap River connects the Tonle Sap Lake with the Mekong River and contributes 9% of the flow of the Mekong.

The size and water volume of the lake varies greatly throughout the year, with a minimum area of about 2,500–3,000 km^{2} (970–1,160 sq mi) and a volume of about 1 km^{3} (0.24 cu mi) in the dry season, and the water body expands in the rainy season, increasing the depth to 9–14 m (30–46 ft). The maximum area is 16,000 km^{2} (6,200 sq mi), and the volume is about 80 km^{3} (19 cu mi).

About 34% of the water in the Tonle Sap comes from the rivers that enter the lake, about 53.5% from the Mekong, and 12.5% from precipitation. May to October is the rainy season in the lower Mekong plain, and November to March is the dry season. The annual rainfall is 1,000–4,000 mm (39–157 in). Almost all the precipitation is in the rainy season. At the end of the dry season, the Tonle Sap Lake has a typical depth of 1 m (3 ft 3 in). As the monsoon rain begins, the water level of the river begins to rise, eventually reversing the flow of the river. The water level of the Tonle Sap increases by about 10 m (33 ft), the flow of the Mekong gradually decreases at the end of the rainy season, and the flow of the Tonle Sap then reverses and begins to replenish the flow of the Mekong. The reversal of the Tonle Sap River's flow also acts as a safety valve to prevent flooding further downstream. During the dry season from December to April, Tonle Sap provides around 50% of the flow to the Mekong Delta in Vietnam.

The hydrodynamic complexity of the Tonle Sap Lake, both in time and space, makes it impossible to measure specific flow, and water level rather than velocity and volume determines the movement of water as it shapes the landscape. 72% of the modern sediments deposited in the Tonle Sap come from the Mekong, while only 28% come from the catchments upstream of the lake. Sediment-bound phosphorus acts as the basis of the food chain through phytoplankton, and internal nutrient cycling plays a crucial role in the productivity of the floodplain and therefore the long-term sustainability of the lake's entire ecosystem.

=== Volume fluctuation and flow reversal ===
Tonle Sap over the course of one year

Inflow starts in May or June with maximum rates of flow of around 10,000 m^{3}/s (350,000 cu ft/s) by late-August and ends in October or November, amplified by precipitation of the annual monsoon. In November the lake reaches its maximum size. The annual monsoon coincides to cease around this time of the year. As the Mekong River is at its minimum flow around this time of the year and its water level falls deeper than the Tonle Sap Lake, the Tonle Sap River and surrounding wetlands, waters of the lake's basin drains via the Tonle Sap River into the Mekong. As a result, the 115 km (71 mi) long Tonle Sap River flows six months a year from southeast (Mekong) to northwest (lake) and six months a year in the opposite direction. The mean annual reverse flow volume in the Tonlé Sap is 30 km^{3} (7.2 cu mi), or about half of the maximum lake volume. A further 10 percent is estimated to enter the system by overland flow from the Mekong. The Mekong branches off into several arms near Phnom Penh and reaches Vietnamese territory south of Koh Thom and Loek Daek Districts of Kandal Province.

"There is extreme hydrodynamic complexity in both time and space and it becomes impossible to measure channel discharge. Water levels, not flow rates and volumes, determine the movement of water across the landscape."

As a natural flood reservoir for the entire Mekong river system, Tonle Sap Lake regulates floods in the lower reaches of Phnom Penh during the rainy season, and is also an important supplement to the dry season flow of the Mekong Delta.

=== Sedimentation ===
Although the large amount of sediment in the Tonle Sap basin is a natural phenomenon, rapid rates of development and resource exploitation has focused the attention of observers who fear the basin is in danger of filling with sediment. These fears were first reported by local people who noticed some areas becoming shallower. With increased sedimentation, already vague transit routes between capital and regional centers would likely be shut down altogether and could restrict the migration of fish into the lake.

Because sediment contains nutrients that fuel food webs, the Tonle Sap benefits from the influx. Sediment-bound phosphorus serves as food for phytoplankton through higher plants, and research has shown that the metabolizing of the chemical contributes to food abundance and quality. Internal nutrient cycling, therefore, plays an essential role in productivity of a floodplain. The nutrients bound to suspended sediments are important for the Tonle Sap system, particularly its long-term sustainability.

== Ecology ==
=== Wetlands, flooded forests, and deciduous forests ===
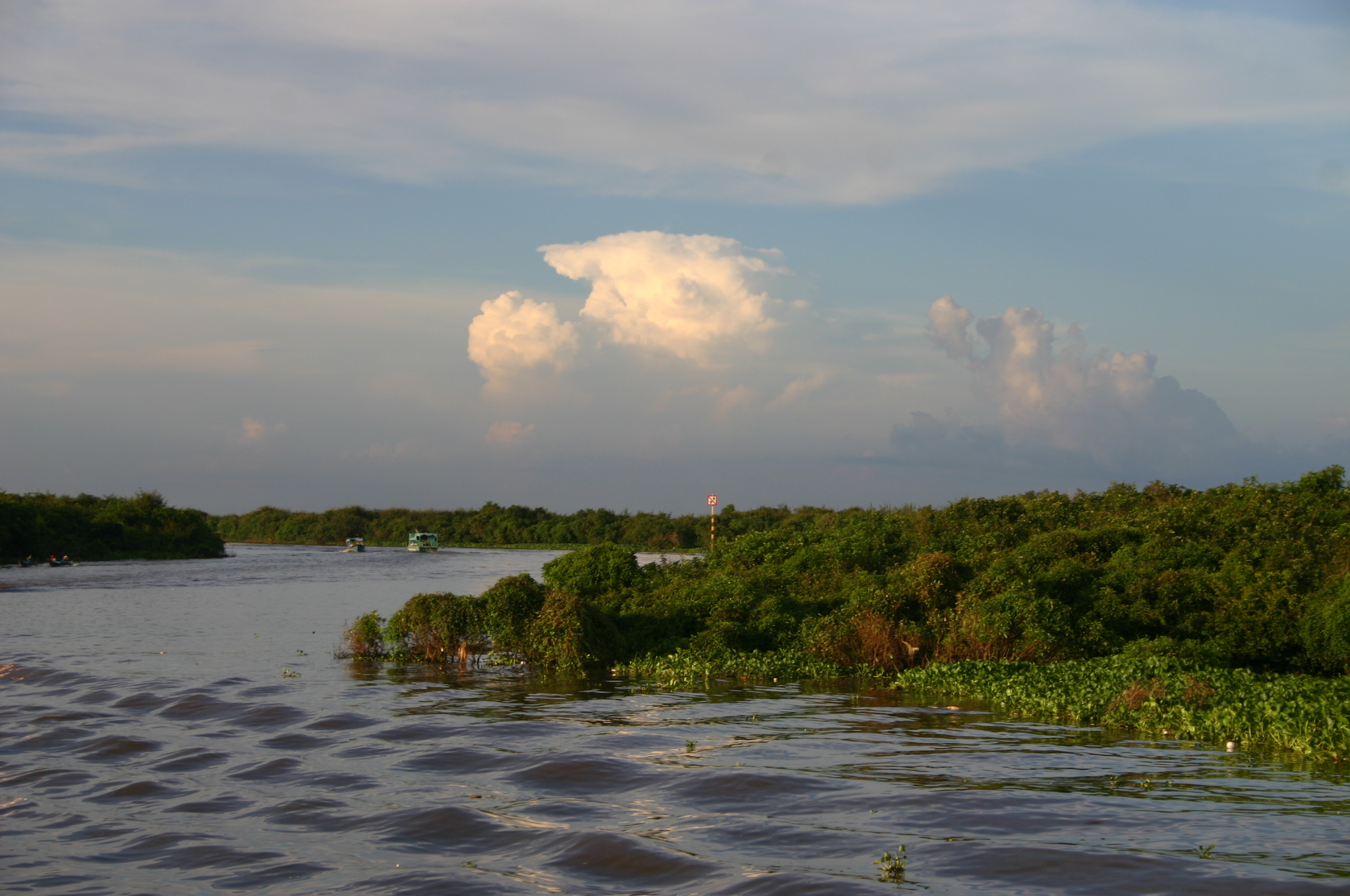
Tonle Sap's flood forests

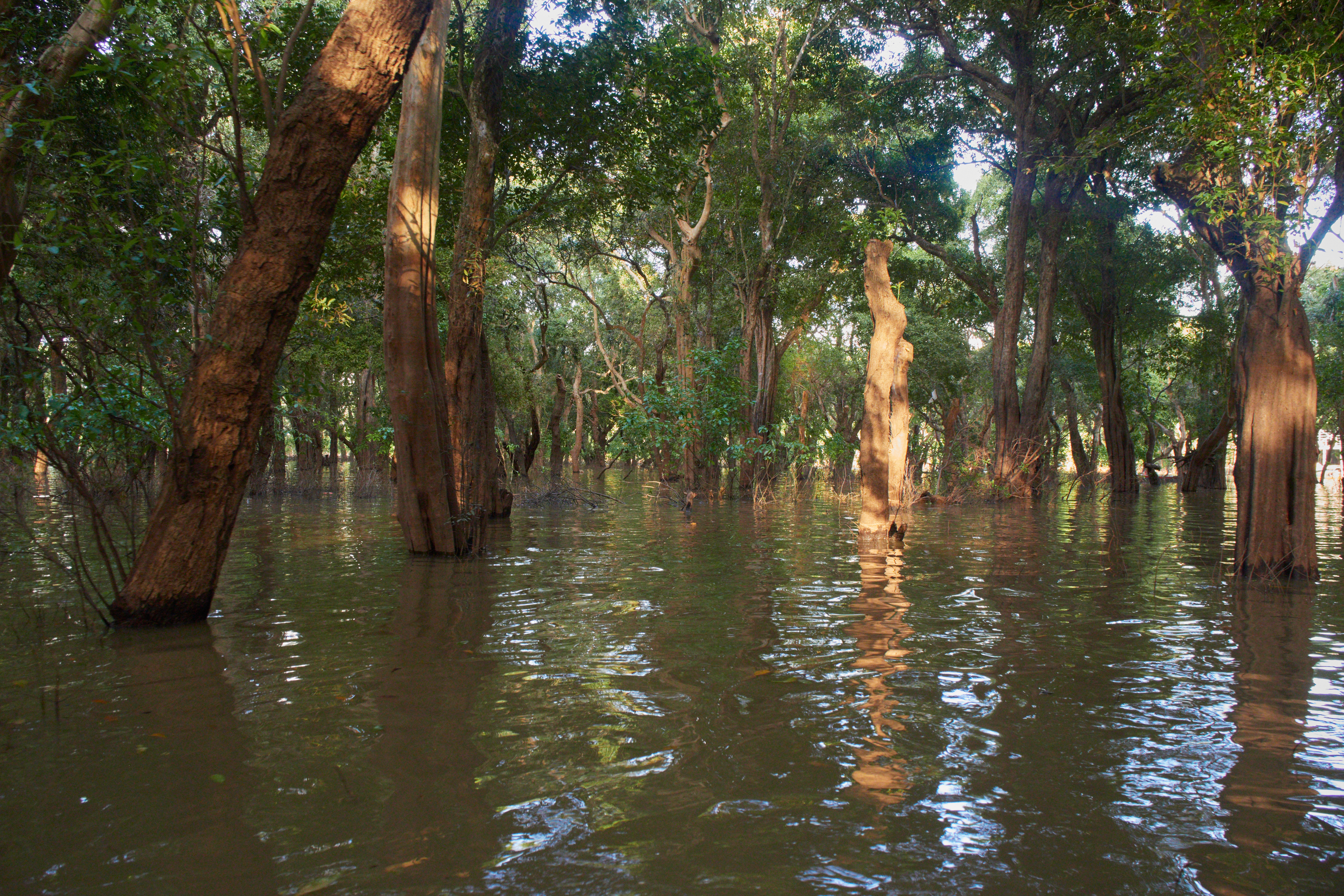
Flooded forest on the shores of Tonle Sap

The land cover of the Tonle Sap basin is 55% forest and 45% agricultural land. The lake is surrounded by freshwater mangroves known as "flood forests", accounting for 3% of the basin area, and the floodplain is surrounded by low hills and covered with evergreen or deciduous seasonal tropical forest dominated by species of Dipterocarpaceae, Leguminosae, Lythraceae, Fagaceae and in some places Pinaceae, Podocarpaceae, or bamboo. Farther from the lake, the forest gradually turns into a thicket, and finally into a meadow. In areas with higher quality soils or higher altitudes, deciduous mixed forests and semi-evergreen forests occur. This variety of vegetation types underlies the species diversity of the Tonle Sap ecosystem, with interlocking forests, grasslands and marshlands providing refuge for local wildlife.

=== Species diversity ===
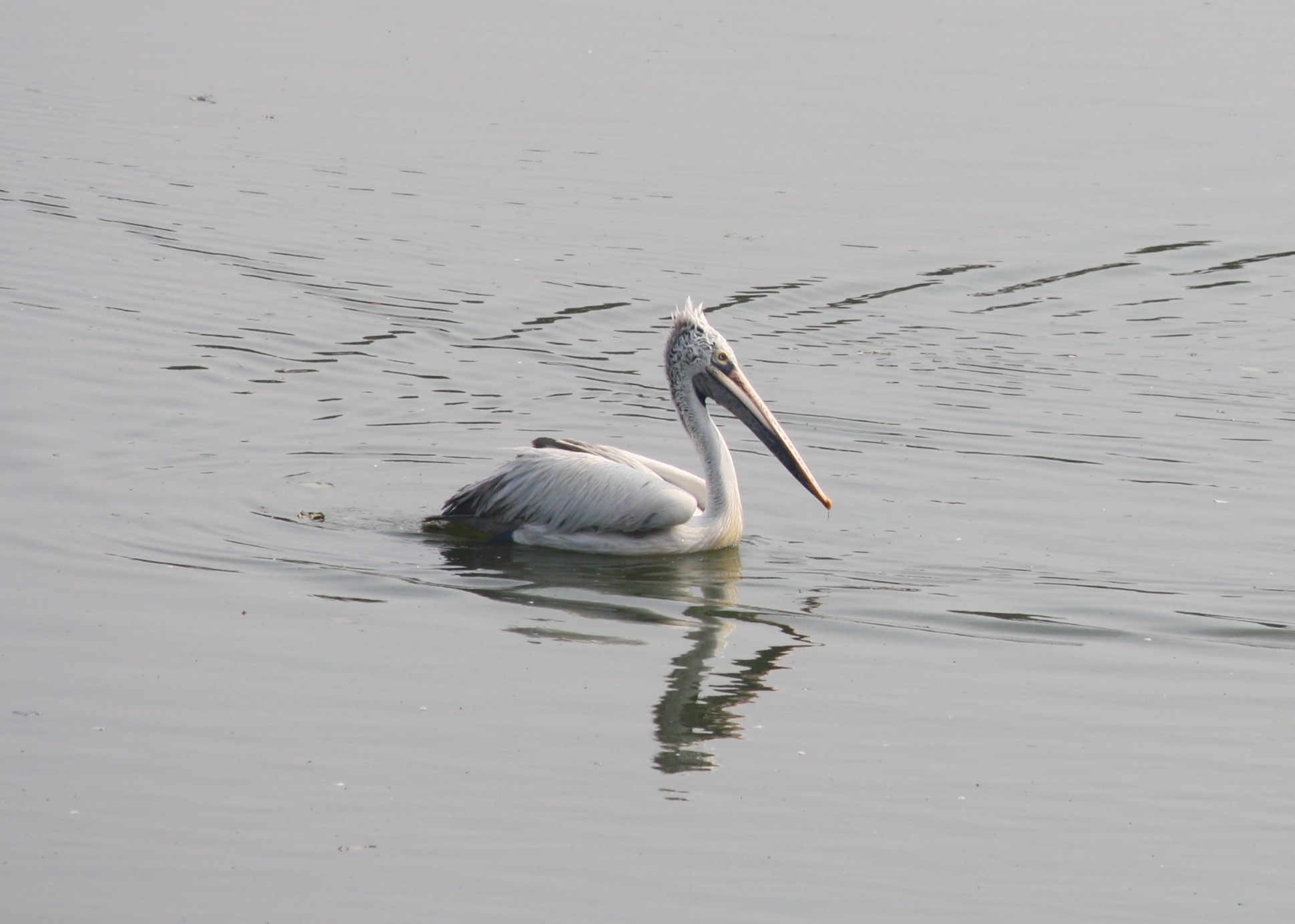
Spot-billed pelican

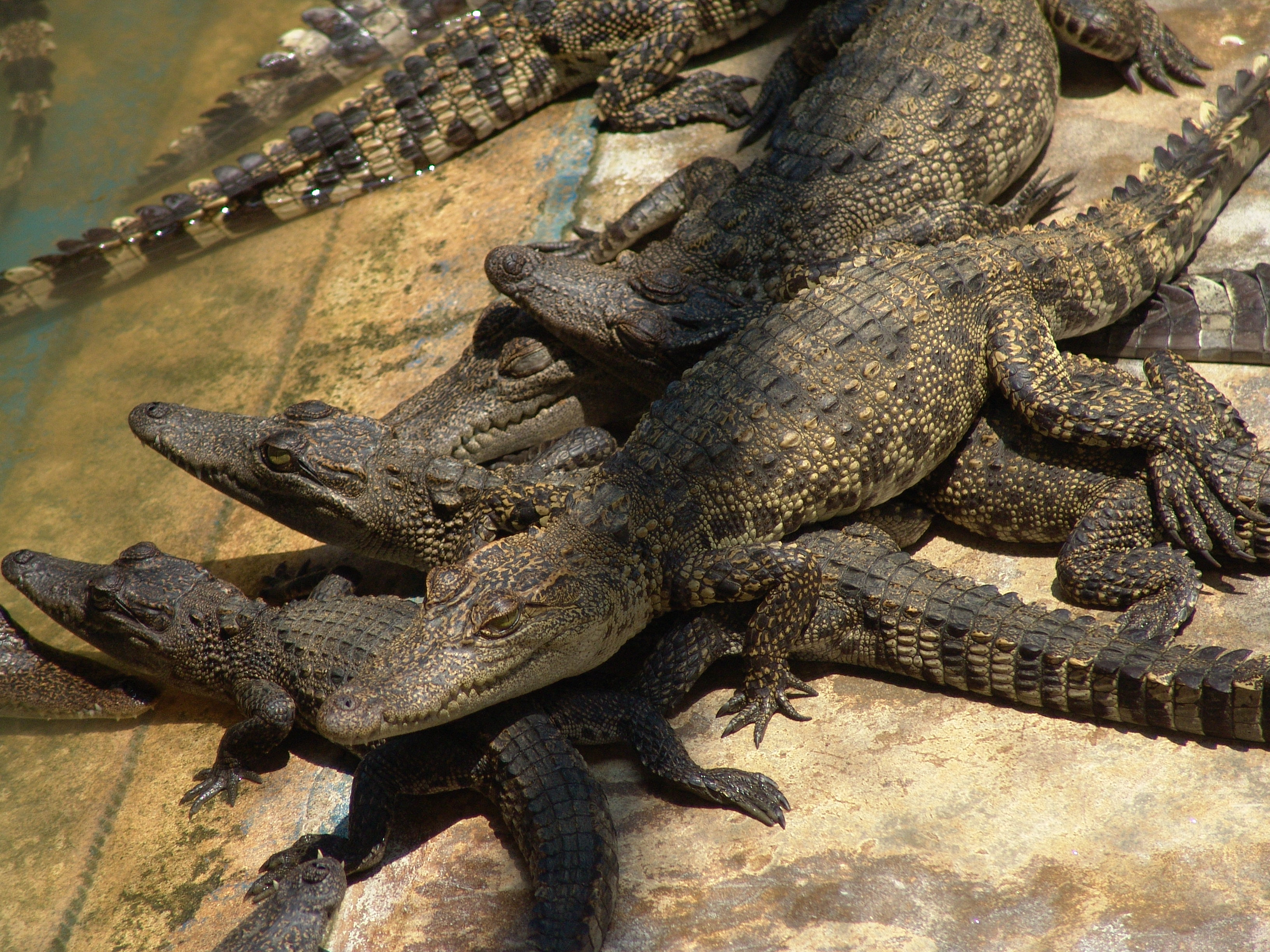
Crocodile farm near Tonle Sap

The lake is home to at least 149 species of fish, 11 of which are globally endangered, and the lake area is also home to 6 near-threatened species. These include spot-billed pelican, greater adjutant, Bengal florican, Oriental darter, grey-headed fish eagle, and the Manchurian reed warbler. Specifically, the large colonies of unique birds constitute the Preak Toal Bird sanctuary. In addition, the Tonle Sap also supports significant reptile populations including nearly extinct Siamese crocodiles and a large number of freshwater snakes. Although the area around the lake has been modified for settlement and farming, about 200 species of plants have been catalogued. Although much of the Lake District has been turned into farmland, 200 species of higher plants are still recorded, including Far Eastern reed.

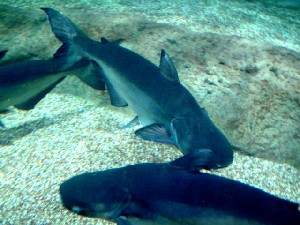
Mekong giant catfish

The Mekong giant catfish, which lives in Tonle Sap, is one of the largest freshwater fish in the world. The fish can grow to 8 to 10 feet (2.4 to 3.0 m) long and can weigh anywhere between 250 and 500 pounds (110 and 230 kg). The largest of these catfish ever caught weighed 306 kilograms (674 lb). Its population has been declining since the mid-1970s. It is currently illegal for fishermen to catch and retain Mekong giant catfish, and only a few are used for scientific research.

=== Tonlé Sap Biosphere Reserve ===
In 1997, UNESCO named Tonle Sap an ecological hotspot. In 2001, by royal decree, the lake and its surrounding provinces became the Tonle Sap Biosphere Reserve. Nine provinces are part of the reserve: Banteay Meanchey, Battambang, Kampong Chhnang, Kampong Thom, Preah Vihear, Pursat, Siem Reap, Oddar Meanchey, and Pailin. Additionally, three zones were established: a core zone, a buffer zone, and a transition zone. The core area of a Biosphere Reserve is defined as an area devoted to biological resources, landscapes, and ecosystems, allowing practices that for conserving biodiversity, monitoring minimally disturbed ecosystems and undertaking non-destructive research and related activities. As of today, the three zones are Prek Toal, Boeng Chhmar, and Stung Sen.

Despite this government protection, illegal fishing, poaching, and cutting of the forest for farmland are all still major problems. Because people living around the lake are extremely poor and depend on the lake for their survival, it is likely that this unsustainable living will continue. During recent years, the amount of fish caught has been steadily declining, which means peasants must also work harder to provide for their families. The government is working on supporting and educating these people to break this cycle of poverty and non-sustainability. Finding a balance between survival and conservation seems to be the major question for the future.

Scientists have also been concerned that high dams built in southern China and Laos will affect the strength and flow of countercurrents into the Tonle Sap, reducing the number of fish in the lake. Tonle Sap habitat for nesting, breeding, spawning, and foraging in the floodplain, which will adversely affect fish productivity and overall biodiversity in the Tonle Sap.

Forest loss hotspots are located in low floodplain areas where protected areas are located. Significant farmland expansion is mainly in the intersection between the lower and upper floodplains. Population growth, fuelwood gathering and logging are the main causes of forest loss. Intensification of agricultural activities and upstream hydropower development reduces buffers to natural habitats and increases the risk of forest loss. By the 2030s, hydropower development may lead to large-scale changes in habitat, with the area of coastal forests likely to decrease by 82%, while the area of rain-fed habitats may increase by 10–13%. In July 2020, under the influence of the El Niño phenomenon and the impoundment of dams in the tributaries of the Mekong River, the water level of lake hit a record low for the same period in the past 60 years.

Flooded-forest restoration work associated with Tonle Sap has included activities by Conservation International Cambodia, including efforts reported in 2024 as restoring about 600 hectares of flooded forest and planting more than 270,000 seedlings since 2010 (with a longer-term restoration target set for 2030).

== Fishery ==
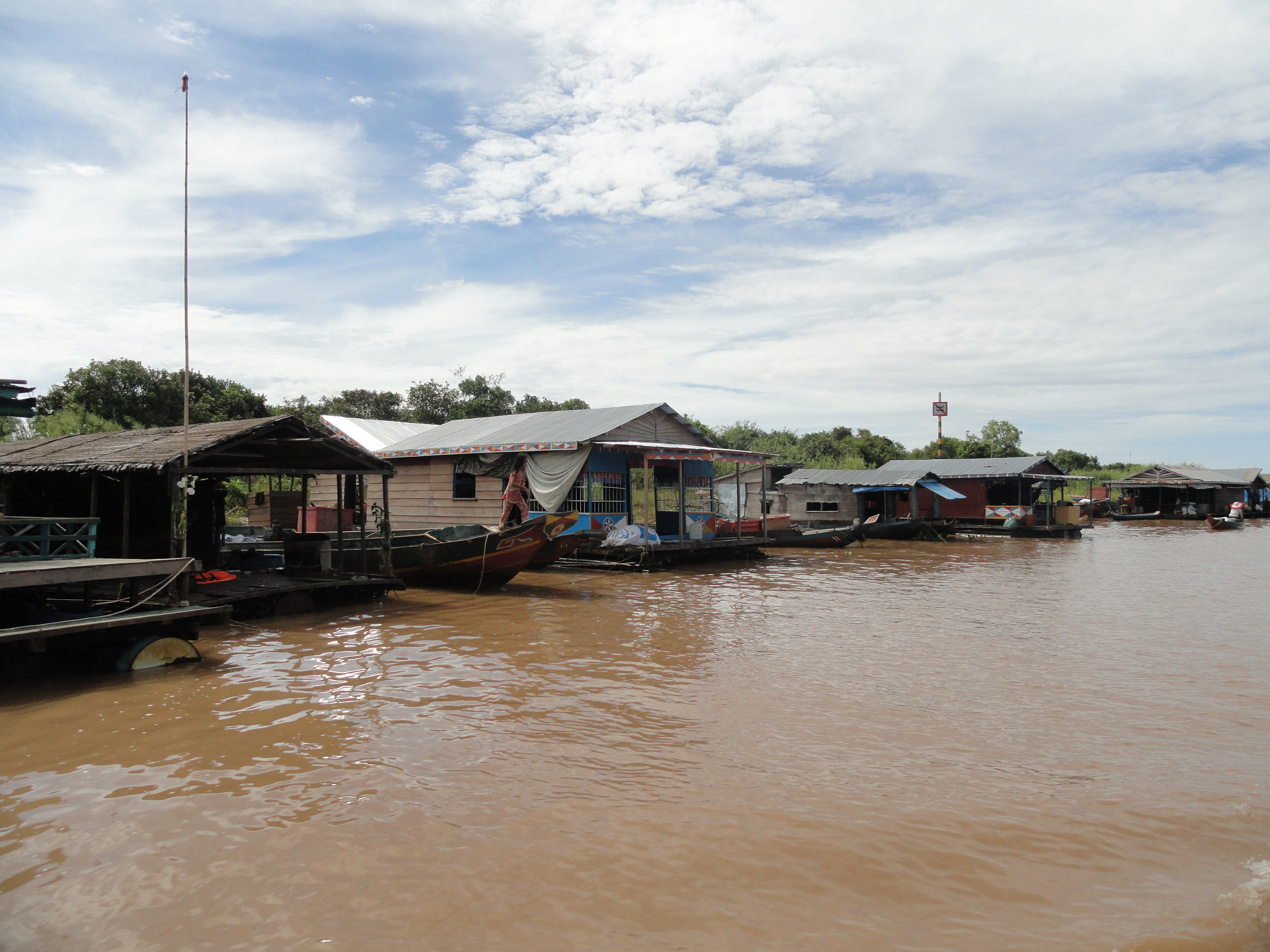
Dwellings on Tonle Sap

The Tonle Sap Lake District has always been a vital fishing and agricultural production area for Cambodia, and it has largely maintained Angkor, the largest pre-industrial settlement complex in history. While many fish left lakes and ponds to spawn in flooded forests at the onset of floods, the inflow of Mekong floods brought large numbers of fry, which found shelter and food in flooded forests and floodplains.

The approximately 1.2 million people who live in the Tonle Sap area, which accounts for about 60% of Cambodia's annual freshwater catch of over 400,000 tons, account for 60% of the country's population's protein intake. Most fish are eaten fresh, and savory and fermented fish paste Prahoc is usually marinated from the least popular fish or leftover fish that cannot be sold fresh. For more than a century, the most productive lake areas have been privatized through a government-lease system of fishing grounds, providing more than $2 million in tax revenue annually.

Per the first precept of Buddhism fishermen tend to limit their catch to what they can feed their families. They do not kill the fish with their own hands but wait for the fish to die naturally after they leave the water. At the end of the rice season, people restore canoes that have been in use for hundreds of years or build new canoes when they can't be repaired in temples along the river, in preparation for the boating competition of the water festival. After two days of racing all the canoes come together to celebrate the Naga, the water serpent, who supposedly spit out the lake into the sea at the end of the rainy season, while bringing fish into the Mekong through the Tonle Sap River.

The area is home to many Cambodians of Vietnamese origin who live in floating villages on boats by the lake. Most of the fishermen of Tonle Sap Lake are of Vietnamese origin. They have lived in Cambodia for a long time and are the main suppliers of the country's fishery market. They had to flee to Vietnam during the Khmer Rouge era from 1975 to 1979. After the downfall of the regime, they returned and continued to fish in the Tonle Sap.

== Cultivated lands and rice ==
The beginning of the dry season is also the beginning of rice season, which is the only source of wealth for peasants. A good harvest will provide enough rice for them to survive for the entire year, but if the floods are too big or too small, rice can become scarce. Because of this uncontrollable instability, many celebrations are held in honor of gods and spirits that can influence nature and bring about a good harvest.

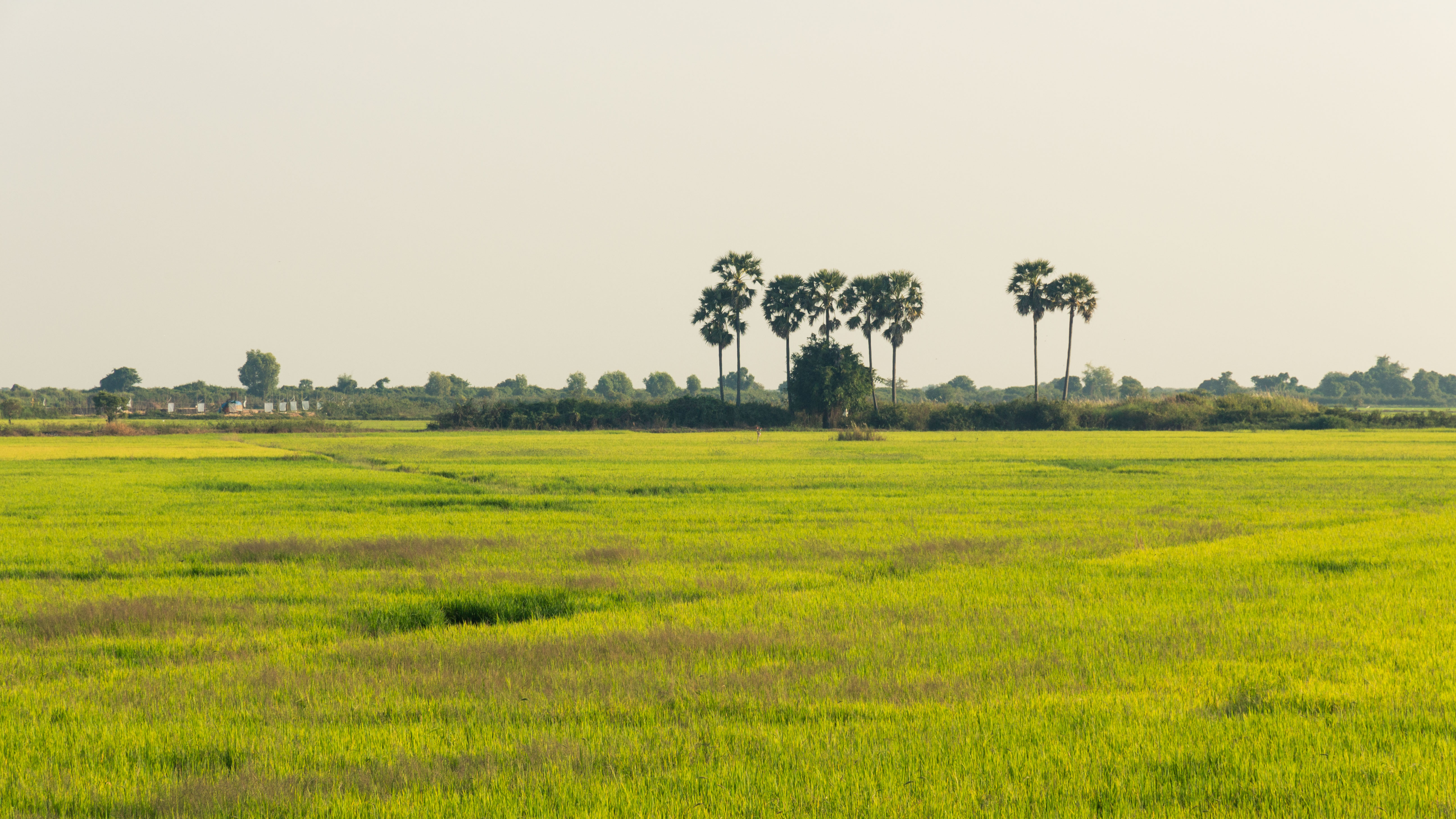
Tonle Sap rice fields

Historical research has shown that the old Angkorian civilization took advantage of the weather conditions by digging huge reservoirs during the wet season and releasing the water during the dry season using an irrigation system and the land's natural slope. This doubled and sometimes even tripled the number of rice crops per year, strengthening the developing nation. However, today, this irrigation network is no longer present, and peasants only get one rice crop a year. What has not changed is the planting of rice in fields as well as the survival value of rice. It is still the main source of income for peasants and the only currency used to bargain. They use the crops to pay for what they need, such as property rent for land to plant, and the rest is kept for the family to eat.

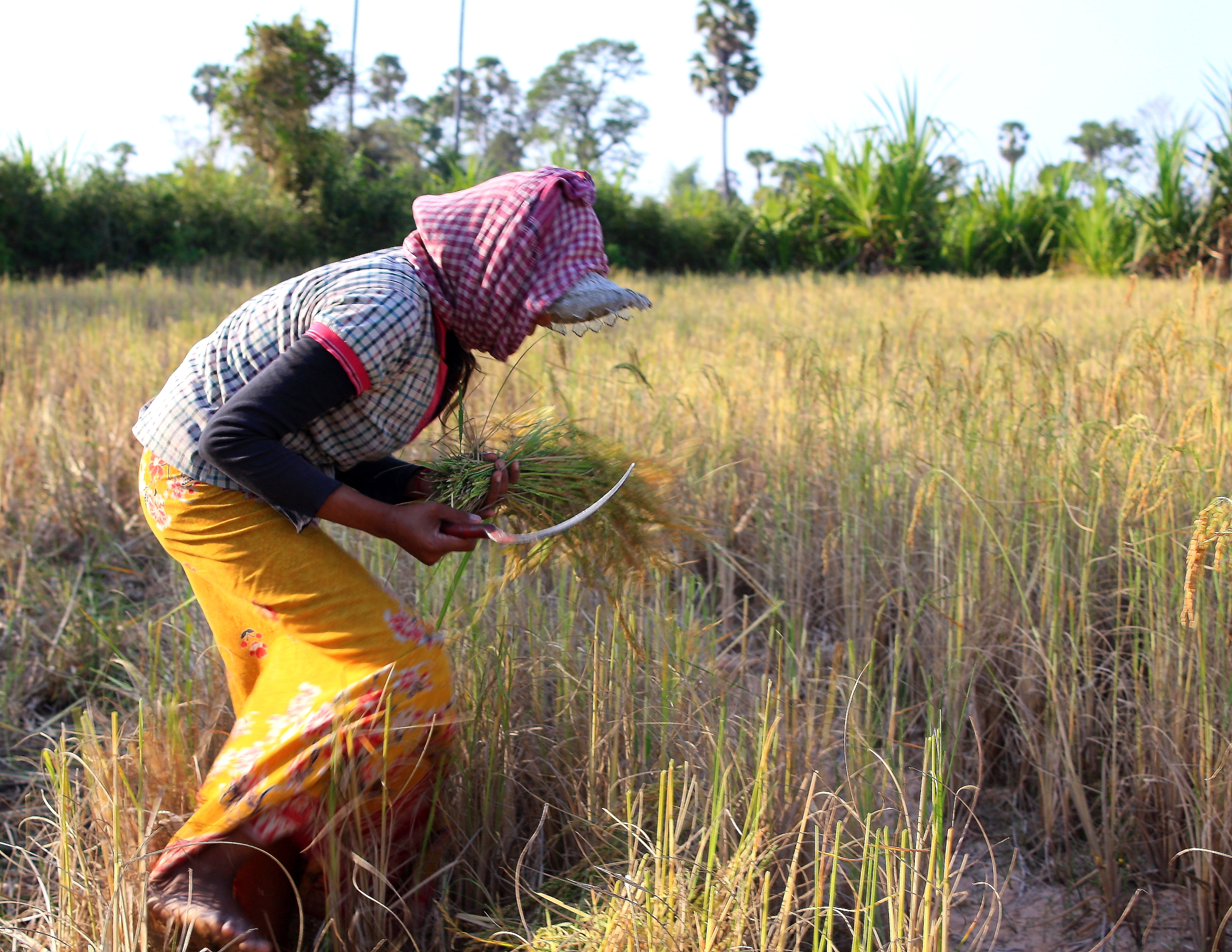
A villager harvesting rice

At the end of the rice season, villagers celebrate by marching in a procession to the temple. This is a chance for everyone to relax after the long labor of the harvest season. As well, it provides an opportunity to have fun and bond with the community. All the villagers wear their nicest clothes, musicians sing and dance, and men take the opportunity to court young women. Upon arrival, believers circle the temple three times and then proceed to present gifts such as clothing, dishes, furniture, and food. These donations, named kathen by Buddha, provide help for bhikkus, who in turn give blessings. This act of donation is essential in accumulating good karma for reincarnation, so eventually to reach Nirvana, or ultimate salvation, as well as for future harvests.

== Cultural significance ==
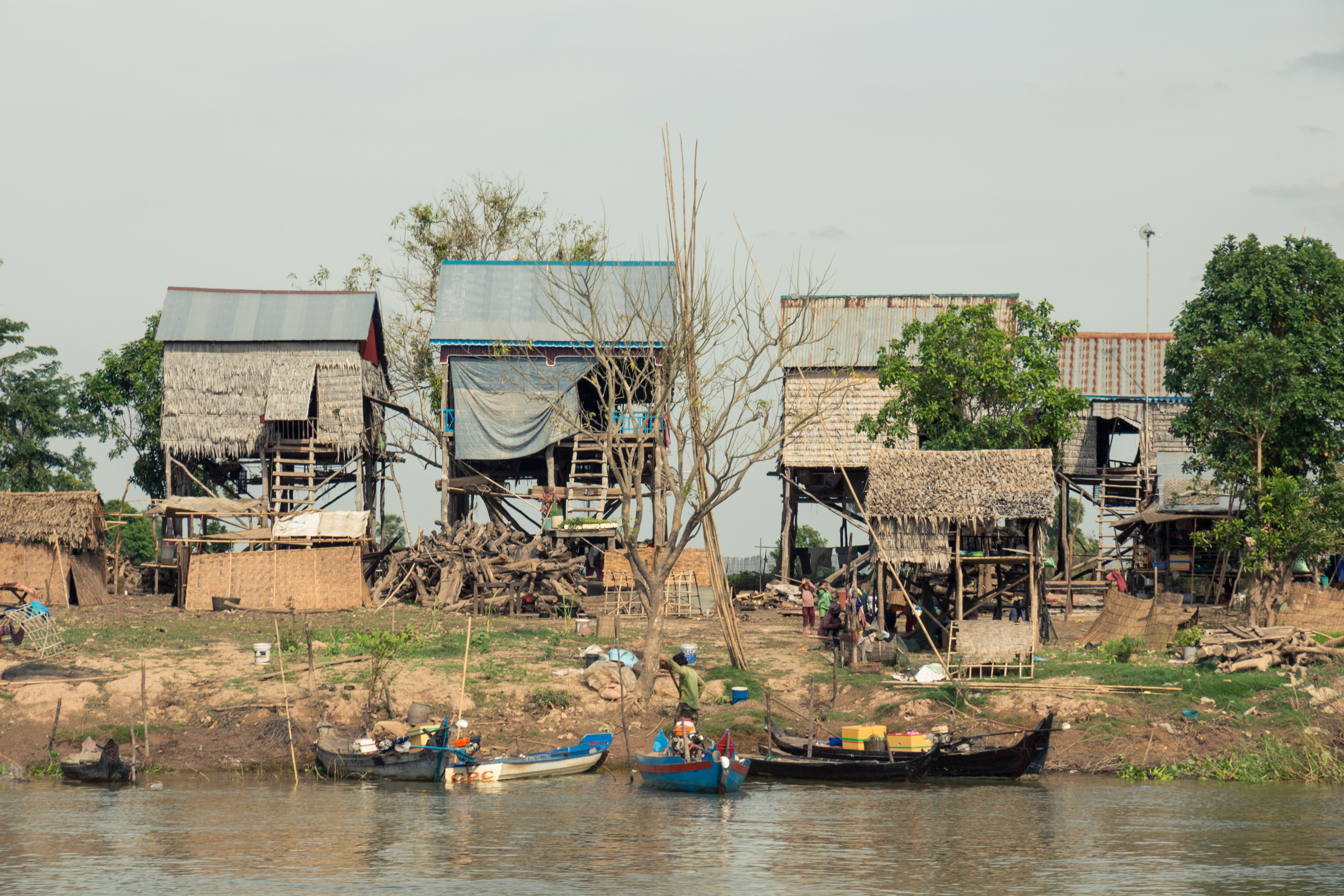
Tonle Sap stilt houses

"During more than five months of the year, the great lake of Cambodia, Touli-Sap, covers an immense space of ground: after that period there is a diminution in depth owing to the great evaporation, but its width remains nearly unaltered. Although its waters increase in volume during the rainy season, these are not swelled by the streams from the mountains on its western boundary, but by the strength of the current from the Mekon [sic] which pours into it its overflow."—Henri Mouhot (1864)

Approximately 1.2 million people living in the greater Tonle Sap make their living by fishing the local waters. Cambodia produces about 400,000 tonnes of freshwater fish per year, the majority of which comes from Tonle Sap. These fisheries account for 16 percent of national GDP, making the fish industry not only essential to the diet of local populations but to the Cambodian economy as a whole. The area is home to many ethnic Vietnamese and numerous Cham communities, living in floating villages around the lake.

=== Celebration of the seven-headed snake ===
This celebration also goes by the name Water and Moon Festival and was established to mark the reversal of the Tonle Sap and open the fishing season. The festival lasts three days and begins on the last day of the full moon. Due to the variation of the monsoon seasons, the reversal of the river does not always coincide exactly with the festival. In the simplest form, the celebration is a series of canoe races, including some 375 teams, and victory brings good fortune for the coming fishing season for the entire village. In addition, these water celebrations are a tribute to a tooth lost in the depths by a nāga whose daughter married a Buddhist Indian prince to establish the kingdom of Cambodia. After two days of racing, all of the canoes come together to encourage the nāga to spit out the swelling waters of the Tonle Sap towards the sea. This moment lets the legendary snake master of water know to return to the depths of the Tonle Sap and leave the power to the sun gods. This also marks the end of the rainy season.

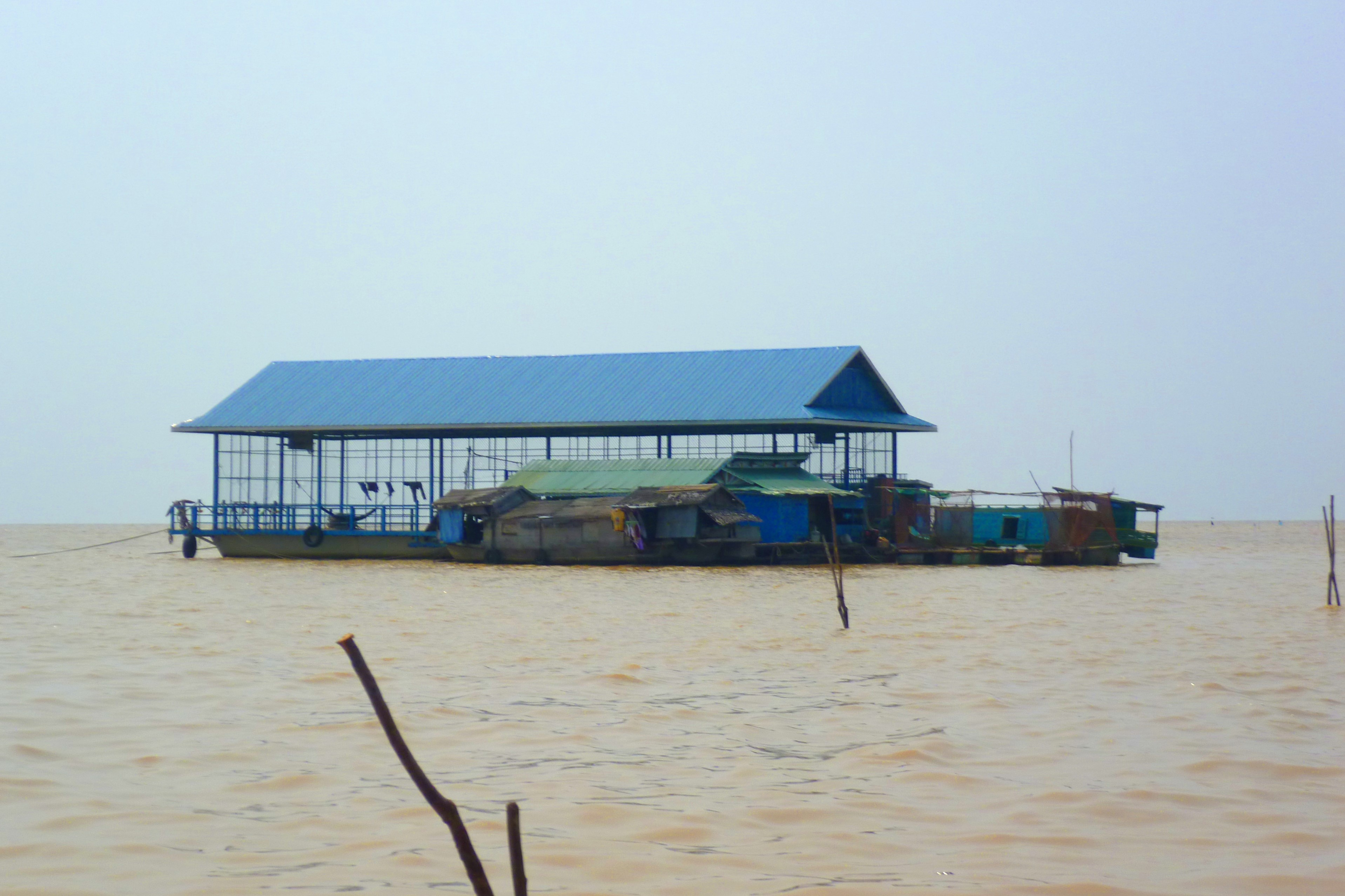
Floating basketball court

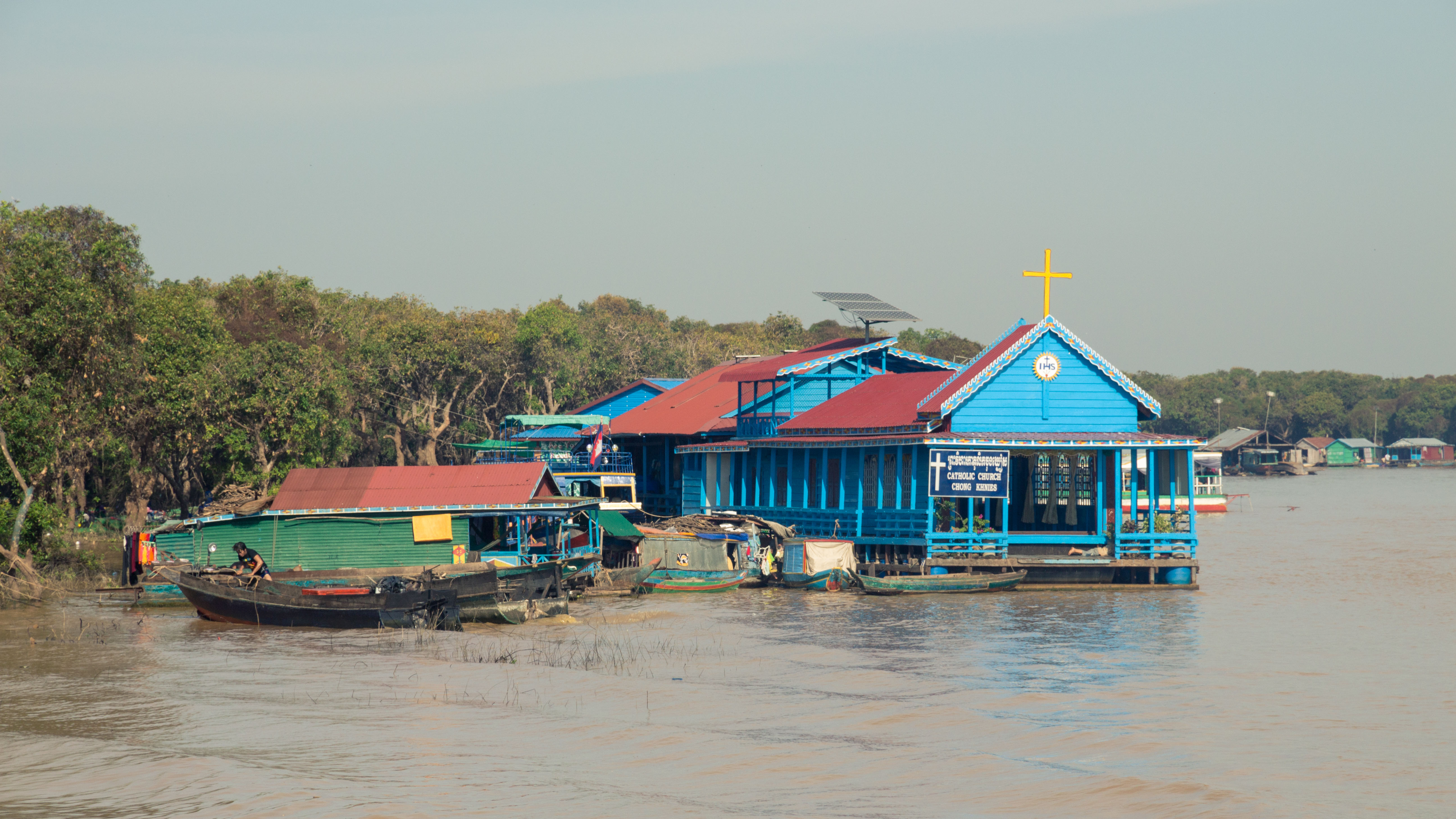
Floating church

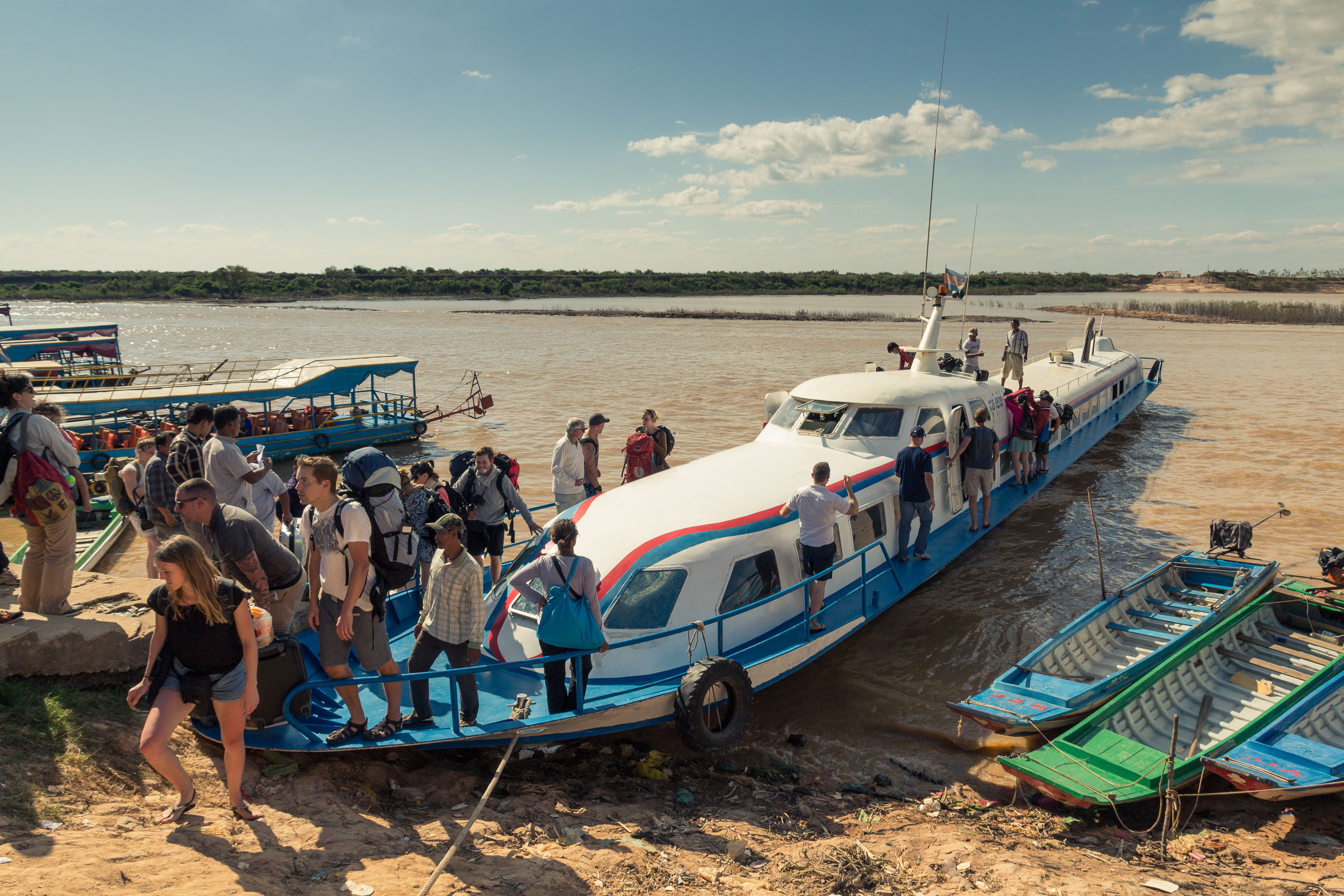
Boat from Phnom Penh to Siem Reap

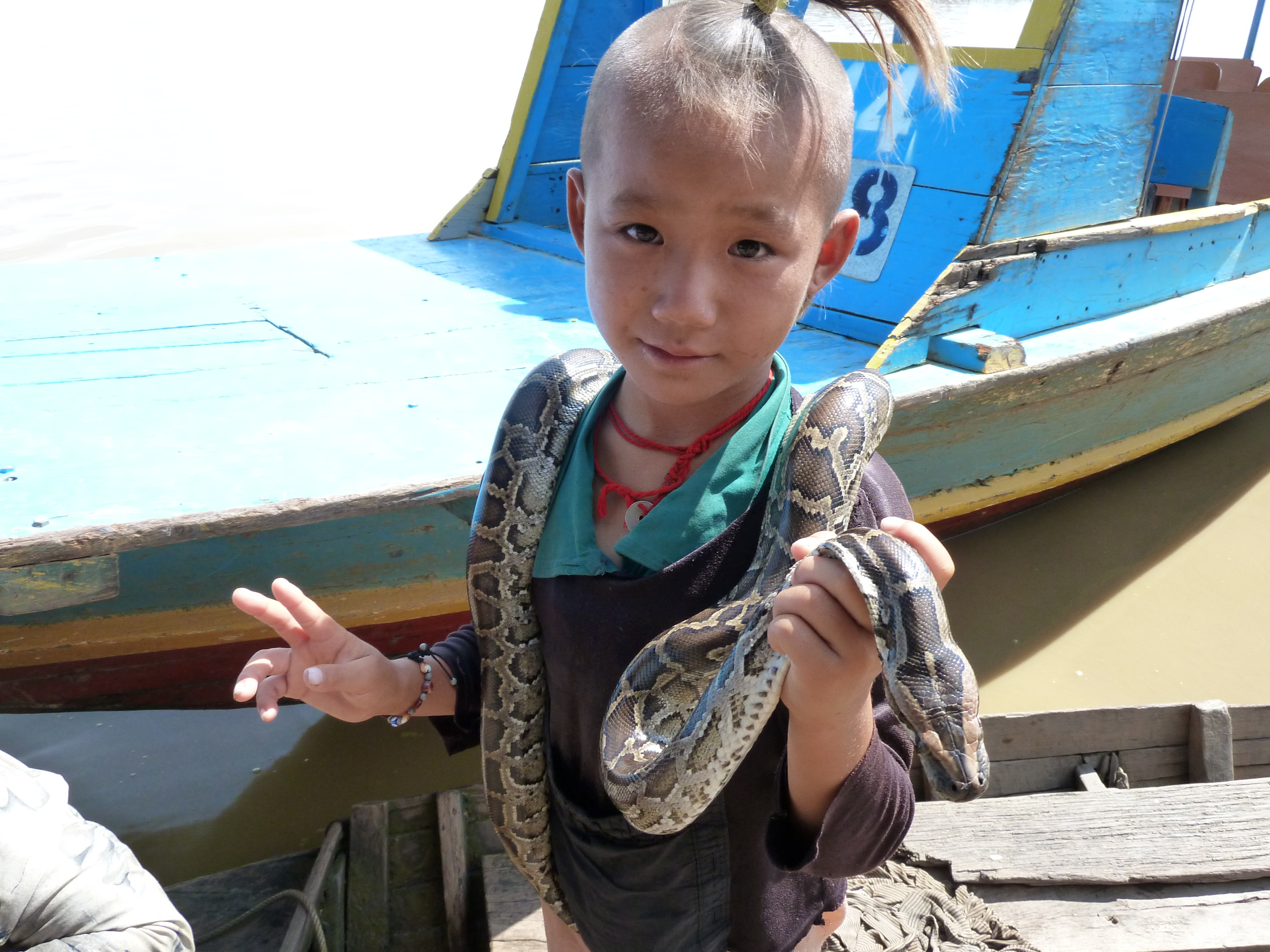
Boy on a boat holding a tame python about his neck.

== See also ==
- Battle of Tonlé Sap
- Climate change in Cambodia
- Mekong River Commission
- Hydropower in the Mekong River Basin
- List of rivers of Cambodia
- 2007 Tonlé Sap dragon boat accident
- Kampong Luong, one of the floating villages on the lake
