= Kamrieng =

Kamrieng may refer to:

- Kamrieng District, a district in Cambodia
- Kamrieng (commune), a commune in the Kamrieng District of Cambodia
