= Bavel =

Bavel may refer to:

- Babel (disambiguation), in the Hebrew bible, the name of Babylon
- Bavel, Netherlands, a village south-east of Breda
- Bavel District, a district of Battambang Province, Cambodia
- Bavel (commune), a commune of Bavel District, Cambodia
- Bas van Bavel (born 1964), Dutch historian
- Bavel (restaurant), a Middle Eastern restaurant in Los Angeles
