= Kdol Tahen =

Commune in Bavel District, Battambang Province, Cambodia

Kdol Tahen ឃុំក្តុលតាហែន
- Commune
- Location within Cambodia
- Coordinates: 13.217°N 102.85°E
- Country: Cambodia
- Province: Battambang Province
- District: Bavel District
- Villages: 27
- Time zone: UTC+07

Kdol Tahen (Khmer: ឃុំក្ដុលតាហែន) is a khum (commune) of Bavel District in Battambang Province in north-western Cambodia.

== Former administration ==
27 villages as follows:

- Suon Sla
- Kdol Kraom
- San
- Peam
- Kandal
- Buor
- Thmei
- Tuol Krasang
- Kdol Leu
- Ta Haen
- Dom Nak Domkoa
- Trapeang Kbal Sva
- Boeng Anlok
- Brab Hoeb
- Sras Toeuk
- Anlong Rey
- Ta Toat
- Ou Doan Poa
- Khleang
- Chrang Bak
- Anlong Riang
- Boeung Sanke
- Tomnob Takoun
- Toul Snal
- Prey Thom
- Kampong Makak
- Bou Sangreach
