= Ta Saen =

Ta Saen ឃុំតាសែន
- Commune
- Location within Cambodia
- Coordinates: 13°10′26″N 102°27′49″E
- Country: Cambodia
- Province: Battambang Province
- District: Kamrieng District
- Villages: 6
- Time zone: UTC+07
- Geocode: 021205

Ta Saen is a khum (commune) of Kamrieng District in Battambang Province in north-western Cambodia.

== Villages ==
- Dei Kraham
- Ou Chamlang
- Ou Anlok
- Ou Toek Thla
- Samaki
- Ou Tracheakchet
