= Peam Aek =

Coordinates: 13°09′N 103°13′E

Peam Aek ឃុំពាមឯក
- Commune
- Interactive map of Peam Aek
- Country: Cambodia
- Province: Battambang Province
- District: Aek Phnum District
- Villages: 8
- Time zone: UTC+07

Peam Aek is a khum (commune) of Aek Phnum District in Battambang Province in north-western Cambodia. Close to this place is the temple site of Wat Ek Phnom.

== Villages ==
- Doun Teav
- Suos Ei
- Peam Aek
- Kong Tum
- Ka Rohal
- Preaek Chdaor
- Ta Kom
- Kouk Doung
