= Preaek Luong =

Coordinates: 13°10′N 103°14′E

Preaek Luong ឃុំព្រែកហ្លួង
- Commune
- Interactive map of Preaek Luong
- Country: Cambodia
- Province: Battambang Province
- District: Aek Phnum District
- Villages: 7
- Time zone: UTC+07

Preaek Luong is a khum (commune) of Aek Phnum District in Battambang Province in north-western Cambodia.

== Villages ==
- Preaek Luong
- Sdei Leu
- Sdei Kraom
- Rohal Suong
- Bak Amraek
- Doun Ent
- Bak Roteh
