= Khnach Romeas =

Commune in Bavel District, Battambang Province, Cambodia

Khnach Romeas ខ្នាចរមាស
- Commune
- Location within Cambodia
- Coordinates: 13.267°N 102.967°E
- Country: Cambodia
- Province: Battambang Province
- District: Bavel District
- Villages: 8
- Time zone: UTC+07

Khnach Romeas (Khmer: ឃុំខ្នាចរមាស) is a khum (commune) of Bavel District in Battambang Province in north-western Cambodia.

== Villages ==
- Prey Sangha ព្រៃសង្ហារ
- Kaoh Ream កោះរាម
- Rung Ampil
- Ballang Leu
- Svay Sa
- Khnach Romeas
- Ballang Mean Chey
- Chroy Sna
