= Prey Tralach =

Coordinates: 12°35′N 103°27′E

Prey Tralach ឃុំព្រៃត្រឡាច
- Commune
- Interactive map of Prey Tralach
- Country: Cambodia
- Province: Battambang Province
- District: Rukhak Kiri District
- Villages: 7
- Time zone: UTC+07

Prey Tralach is a khum (commune) of Rukhak Kiri District in Battambang Province in north-western Cambodia.

Before January 9, 2009, it was in Moung Ruessei District, Battambang Province.

== Villages ==
- Sdok Pravoek
- Prey Tralach
- Kos Thom
- Srah Kuy
- Muk Ra
- Svay Yar
- Toul Svay
- Prah Andong
- Toul Koki
- Prey Khloat
- Pen
- Chung Por
- Roong
- Ta Preat
