= Prek Chik =

Prek Chik ឃុំព្រែកជីក
- Commune
- Location within Cambodia
- Coordinates: 12°37′25″N 103°22′44″E
- Country: Cambodia
- Province: Battambang Province
- District: Rukhak Kiri District
- Villages: 9
- Time zone: UTC+07
- Geocode: 021401

Prek Chik is a khum (commune) of Rukhak Kiri District in Battambang Province in north-western Cambodia.

Before January 9, 2009, it was in Moung Ruessei District, Battambang Province.

== Villages ==
- Siem
- Khnach Ampor
- Chhkae Kham Praeus
- Preaek Ta Ven
- Preaek Chik
- Ou Rumcheck
- Thnam
- Boeng Ampil
- Boeng Thmouy
