= Pring =

Pring may refer to:

- Boeng Pring, a khum (commune) of Thma Koul District, Battambang Province, Cambodia
- Daniel Pring (1788–1846), officer in the British Royal Navy
- John Pring (1927–2014), New Zealand rugby union referee
- Martin Pring (1580–1626), English explorer
- Ratcliffe Pring (1825–1885), first Attorney-General in colonial Queensland, Australia
- Gavin Pring, George Harrison impersonator and member of Beatles tribute The Fab Four

== See also ==
- Princess Pring, a Korean media franchise
