= Andaeuk Haeb =

Coordinates: 12°52′N 102°58′E

Andaeuk Haeb ឃុំអណ្តើកហែប
- Commune
- Interactive map of Andaeuk Haeb
- Country: Cambodia
- Province: Battambang
- District: Rotanak Mondol
- Villages: 7
- Time zone: UTC+7 (ICT)

Andaeuk Haeb (Khmer: អណ្តើកហែប [ɑnˈɗaək haep]) is a commune (khum) of Rotanak Mondol District in Battambang Province in north-western Cambodia.

== Villages ==
- Andaeuk Haeb
- Svay Chuor
- Thma Prus
- Serei Voan
- Prey Ampor
- Kandal Steung
- Thvak
