= Tuol Ta Aek =

Coordinates: 13°05′N 103°11′E

Tuol Ta Aek សង្កាត់ទួលតាឯក
- Quarter
- Interactive map of Tuol Ta Aek
- Country: Cambodia
- Province: Battambang Province
- District: Battambang District
- Villages: 5
- Time zone: UTC+07

Tuol Ta Aek (សង្កាត់ទួលតាឯក) is a khum (commune) of Battambang District in Battambang Province in north-western Cambodia.

== Villages ==
Tuol Ta Aek contains five villages.

Name	Khmer	Village code
Ou Ta Kam Muoy	អូរតាកាំ ១	2030101
Ou Ta Kam Pir	អូរតាកាំ ២	2030102
Ou Ta Kam Bei	អូរតាកាំ ៣	2030103
Tuol Ta Aek	ទួលតាឯក	2030104
Dangkao Teab	ដង្កោទាប	2030105
