= Ta Meun =

Coordinates: 13°17′N 103°06′E

Ta Meun ឃុំតាម៉ឺន
- Commune
- Interactive map of Ta Meun
- Country: Cambodia
- Province: Battambang Province
- District: Thma Koul District
- Villages: 10
- Time zone: UTC+07

Ta Meun (Khmer: ឃុំតាម៉ឺន) is a khum (commune) of Thma Koul District in Battambang Province in north-western Cambodia.

== Villages ==
Ta Meun contains ten villages.

Name	Khmer	Village code
Thma Koul Cheung	ថ្មគោលជើង	2020201
Kouk Trab	គោកត្រប់	2020202
Tumneab	ទំនាប	2020203
Ta Sei	តាសី	2020204
Chrouy Mtes	ជ្រោយម្ទេស	2020205
Krasang	ក្រសាំង	2020206
Samraong	សំរោង	2020207
Thmei	ថ្មី	2020208
Ang Cheung	អង់ជើង	2020209
Tumpung Cheung	ទំពូងជើង	2020210
