= Trang (commune) =

Trang ឃុំត្រាង
- Commune
- Location within Cambodia
- Coordinates: 13°08′00″N 102°28′35″E
- Country: Cambodia
- Province: Battambang Province
- District: Kamrieng District
- Villages: 9
- Time zone: UTC+07
- Geocode: 021204

Trang is a khum (commune) of Kamrieng District in Battambang Province in north-western Cambodia.

== Villages ==
Village code	Name	Khmer
02120401	Trang	ត្រាង
02120402	Kandal	កណ្តាល
02120403	Svay Prey	ស្វាយព្រៃ
02120404	Thmei	ថ្មី
02120405	Lvea Te	ល្វាទេ
02120406	Ta Saen	តាសែន
02120407	Ou Kokir	អូរគគីរ
02120408	Ou Chambak	អូរចំបក់
02120409	Phnum Muoy Roy	ភ្នំមួយរយ
