= Rung Chrey =

Rung Chrey ឃុំរូងជ្រៃ
- Commune
- Interactive map of Rung Chrey
- Coordinates: 13°15′56.9″N 102°59′4.6″E
- Country: Cambodia
- Province: Battambang Province
- District: Thma Koul District
- Villages: 8
- Time zone: UTC+07

Rung Chrey (ឃុំរូងជ្រៃ) is a khum (commune) of Thma Koul District in Battambang Province in north-western Cambodia.

== Villages ==
Rung Chrey contains seven villages.

Name	Khmer	Village code
Ballang Kraom	បល្ល័ង្កក្រោម	2021001
Prakeab	ប្រគាប	2021002
Kouk Khpos	គោកខ្ពស់	2021003
Paoy Rumchey	ប៉ោយរំជៃ	2021004
Preah Ponlea	ព្រះពន្លា	2021005
Rung Chrey	រូងជ្រៃ	2021006
Tuol	ទួល	2021007
