= Anlong Run =

Coordinates: 13°10′N 103°02′E

Anlong Run ឃុំអន្លង់រុន
- Commune
- Interactive map of Anlong Run
- Country: Cambodia
- Province: Battambang Province
- District: Thma Koul District
- Villages: 5
- Time zone: UTC+07

Anlong Run (Khmer: ឃុំអន្លង់រុន) is a khum (commune) of Thma Koul District in Battambang Province in northwestern Cambodia.

== Villages ==
Anlong Run contains five villages.

Name	Khmer	Village code
Char	ចារ	2020501
Sla Slak	ស្លាស្លាក់	2020502
Chab Kab	ចបកាប់	2020503
Souphi	សូភី	2020504
Kruos	គ្រួស	2020505
