= Prey Khpos =

- Commune
- Location within Cambodia
- Coordinates: 13.3°N 102.867°E
- Country: Cambodia
- Province: Battambang Province
- District: Bavel District
- Villages: 9
- Time zone: UTC+07

Prey Khpos is a khum (commune) of Bavel District in Battambang Province in north-western Cambodia.

== Villages ==
- Ta Hi
- Pou
- Ta Mat
- Meakkloea
- Prey Khpos
- Sranal
- Dangkao Pen
- Kbal Thnal
- Boeng Chra Nieng
