= Ou Mal =

Coordinates: 13°05′N 103°09′E

Ou Mal ឃុំអូរម៉ាល់
- Commune
- Interactive map of Ou Mal
- Country: Cambodia
- Province: Battambang Province
- District: Battambang District
- Villages: 9
- Time zone: UTC+07

Ou Mal is a khum (commune) of Battambang District in Battambang Province in north-western Cambodia.

== Villages ==
- Ou Mal
- Dak Sasar
- Sala Balat
- Prey Dach
- Kouk Ponley
- Voat Roka
- Koun Sek
- Andoung Pring
- Boeng Reang
- Prey Roka
