= Samraong Knong =

Coordinates: 13°08′N 103°13′E

Samraong Knong ឃុំសំរោងក្នុង
- Commune
- Interactive map of Samraong Knong
- Country: Cambodia
- Province: Battambang Province
- District: Aek Phnum District
- Villages: 5
- Time zone: UTC+07

Samraong Knong is a khum (commune) of Aek Phnum District in Battambang Province in north-western Cambodia.

== Villages ==
- Samraong Knong
- Kampong Sambuor
- Samraong Snao
- Samraong Ou Trea
- Samraong Ta Kok
