= Ta Krei =

Ta Krei ឃុំតាក្រី
- Commune
- Location within Cambodia
- Coordinates: 13°09′23″N 102°41′18″E
- Country: Cambodia
- Province: Battambang Province
- District: Kamrieng District
- Villages: 10
- Time zone: UTC+07
- Geocode: 021206

Ta Krei is a khum (commune) of Kamrieng District in Battambang Province in north-western Cambodia.

== Villages ==
- Damnak Sala
- Kampong Chamlang Leu
- Kampong Chamlang Kraom
- Kamprang
- Srah Tuek Thmei
- Samseb
- Srah Kampaok
- Ta Krei
- Tuol Til
- Phlov Pram Muoy
