= Rotanak =

Coordinates: 13°21′N 105°12′E

Rotanak ឃុំរតនៈ
- Commune
- Interactive map of Rotanak
- Country: Cambodia
- Province: Battambang Province
- District: Battambang District
- Villages: 8
- Time zone: UTC+07

Rotanak (ឃុំរតនៈ) is a khum (commune) of Battambang District in Battambang Province in north-western Cambodia.

== Villages ==
Rotanak contains eight villages.

Name	Khmer	Village code
Rumchek Muoy	រំចេក ១	2030301
Rumchek Pir	រំចេក ២	2030302
Rumchek Bei	រំចេក ៣	2030303
Rumchek Buon	រំចេក ៤	2030304
Rumchek Pram	រំចេក ៥	2030305
Souphi Muoy	សូភី ១	2030306
Souphi Pir	សូភី ២	2030307
Rotanak	រតនៈ	2030308
