= Preaek Norint =

Preaek Norint ឃុំព្រែកនរិន្ទ
- Commune
- Location within Cambodia
- Coordinates: 13°13′36″N 103°16′24″E
- Country: Cambodia
- Province: Battambang Province
- District: Aek Phnum District
- Villages: 10
- Time zone: UTC+07
- Geocode: 020501

Preaek Norint is a khum (commune) of Aek Phnum District in Battambang Province in north-western Cambodia.

== Villages ==
- Preaek Ta Chraeng
- Preaek Krouch
- Svay Chrum
- Preaek Norint
- Sdei
- Rohal Suong
- Duong Mea
- Reach Doun Kaev
- Ansang Sak
- Preaek Trab
