= Traeng =

Coordinates: 12°54′N 102°59′E

Traeng ឃុំត្រែង
- Commune
- Interactive map of Traeng
- Country: Cambodia
- Province: Battambang
- District: Rotanak Mondol
- Villages: 7
- Time zone: UTC+7 (ICT)

Traeng (Khmer: ត្រែង [traeŋ]) is a commune (khum) in Rotanak Mondol District, Battambang Province in north-western Cambodia.

== Villages ==
- Kilou
- Phcheav
- Chea Montrei
- Chi Sang
- Kilou Samprambei
- Svay Sa
- Ta Krok
