= Bavel (commune) =

Commune in Bavel District, Battambang Province, Cambodia

Coordinates: 13°15′N 102°53′E

Bavel ឃុំបវេល
- Commune
- Interactive map of Bavel
- Country: Cambodia
- Province: Battambang Province
- District: Bavel District
- Villages: 18
- Time zone: UTC+07

Bavel (Khmer: ឃុំបវេល) is a khum (commune) of Bavel District in Battambang Province in north-western Cambodia.

== Villages ==
- Bavel Muoy
- Bavel Pir
- Tumnob Tuek
- Dach Proat
- Sangkae Vear
- Peam
- Kampong Pnov
- Stueng Dach
- Spean Dach
- Sang Reang
- Svay Chrum
- Doun Avav
- Prey Totueng Muoy
- Prey Totueng Pir
- Kouk
- Sla Khlanh
- Kampong Chhnang Muoy
- Kampong Chhnang Pir
- Samaki
