= Chrouy Sdau =

Commune in Thma Koul District, Battambang Province, Cambodia

Coordinates: 13°20′N 103°05′E

Chrouy Sdau ឃុំជ្រោយស្តៅ
- Commune
- Interactive map of Chrouy Sdau
- Country: Cambodia
- Province: Battambang Province
- District: Thma Koul District
- Villages: 3
- Time zone: UTC+07

Chrouy Sdau (Khmer: ឃុំជ្រោយស្តៅ) is a khum (commune) of Thma Koul District in Battambang Province in north-western Cambodia.

== Villages ==
Chrouy Sday contains three villages.

Name	Khmer	Village code
Chrouy Sdau	ជ្រោយស្តៅ	2020601
Nikom Krau	និគមក្រៅ	2020602
Nikom Knong	និគមក្នុង	2020603
