= Preaek Khpob =

Preaek Khpob ឃុំព្រែកខ្ពប
- Commune
- Location within Cambodia
- Coordinates: 13°08′40″N 103°14′38″E
- Country: Cambodia
- Province: Battambang Province
- District: Aek Phnum District
- Villages: 5
- Time zone: UTC+07
- Geocode: 020503

Preaek Khpob is a khum (commune) of Aek Phnum District in Battambang Province in north-western Cambodia.

== Villages ==
- Preaek Snao
- Preaek Khpos
- Sna Pi Mukh
- Khvet
- Ou Kambot
