= Kouk Khmum =

Commune in Thma Koul District, Battambang Province, Cambodia

Coordinates: 13°16′N 103°04′E

Kouk Khmum ឃុំគោកឃ្មុំ
- Commune
- Interactive map of Kouk Khmum
- Country: Cambodia
- Province: Battambang Province
- District: Thma Koul District
- Villages: 8
- Time zone: UTC+07

Kouk Khmum (Khmer: ឃុំគោកឃ្មុំ) is a khum (commune) of Thma Koul District in Battambang Province in north-western Cambodia.

== Villages ==
Kouk Khmum contains eight villages.

Name	Khmer	Village code
Kien Kaes Muoy	កៀនកែស ១	2020801
Kien Kaes Pir	កៀនកែស ២	2020802
Ta Meakh	តាមាឃ	2020803
Chranieng	ច្រនៀង	2020804
Kouk Khmum	គោកឃ្មុំ	2020805
Kandal Tboung	កណ្តាលត្បូង	2020806
Kandal Cheung	កណ្តាលជើង	2020807
Chhkae Koun	ឆ្កែកូន	2020808
