= Sdau =

Sdau ឃុំស្តៅ
- Commune
- Interactive map of Sdau
- Country: Cambodia
- Province: Battambang
- District: Rotanak Mondol
- Villages: 16
- Time zone: UTC+7 (ICT)

Sdau (Khmer: ស្តៅ [sɗaw]) is a commune (khum) of Rotanak Mondol District in Battambang Province in north-western Cambodia.

== Villages ==
- Banang
- Sdau
- Chamkar Lmut
- Boeng Ampil
- Dangkot
- Doun Meay
- Baribou
- Koak Chhor
- Reak Smey Sangha
- Neang Lem
- Angdoek Dobmouy
- Pich Chanva
- Badak Tboang
- Badak Chhoeung
- Ou Dai Khla
- O Khmum
