= Ou Char =

Coordinates: 13°06′N 103°11′E

Ou Char ឃុំអូរចារ
- Commune
- Interactive map of Ou Char
- Country: Cambodia
- Province: Battambang Province
- District: Battambang District
- Villages: 6
- Time zone: UTC+07

Ou Char (Khmer: ឃុំអូរចារ) is a khum (commune) of Battambang District in Battambang Province in north-western Cambodia.

== Villages ==
- Ou Char
- Prey Koun Sek
- Kab Kou Thmei
- Andoung Chenh
- Anhchanh
- Ang
