= Lvea =

Commune in Bavel District, Battambang Province, Cambodia

Lvea ល្វា
- Commune
- Lvea Commune; ឃុំល្វា; Khum Lvea
- Location within Cambodia
- Coordinates: 13.35°N 102.91°E
- Country: Cambodia
- Province: Battambang
- District: Bavel
- Villages: 12
- Time zone: UTC+07:00 (ICT)

Lvea (Khmer: ល្វា [lʋiə]) is a commune (khum) of Bavel District in Battambang Province in north-western Cambodia.

== Villages ==
- Lvea (ល្វា)
- Doun Nhaem (ដូនញ៉ែម)
- Chamkar (ចម្ការ)
- Dangkao (ដង្កោ)
- Ream Sena (រាមសេនា)
- Doun Aok (ដូនឱក)
- Ping Pong (ពីងពង)
- Svay Prey (ស្វាយព្រៃ)
- Boeng Samraong (បឹងសំរោង)
- Kbal Spean (ក្បាលស្ពាន)
- Lvea Chas (ល្វាចាស់)
- Ta Ny (តានី)
