= Phnom Sampov =

- ភ្នំសំពៅ
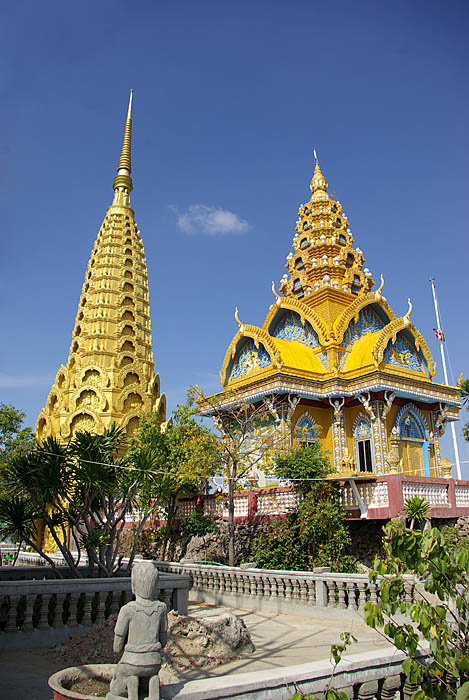
- Temple at Phnom Sampov

Highest point
- Elevation: 762 m (2,500 ft)
- Coordinates: 13°06′N 103°30′E

Geography
- Location within Cambodia
- Location: Battambang Province, Cambodia

Geology
- Mountain type: limestone

Phnom Sampov (Note: Khmer: ភ្នំសំពៅ, romanized: Phnǒm Sǎmpou; Khmer pronunciation: [pʰnɔm sɑm.pɨw] lit. 'Ship Mountain') is a limestone mountain and important religious site located in Battambang Province.

== See also ==
- Killing caves of Phnom Sampeau
