= Ou Da =

Ou Da ឃុំអូរដា
- Commune
- Location within Cambodia
- Coordinates: 13°06′13″N 102°33′11″E
- Country: Cambodia
- Province: Battambang Province
- District: Kamrieng District
- Villages: 10
- Time zone: UTC+07
- Geocode: 021203

Ou Da is a commune of Kamrieng District in Battambang Province in north-western Cambodia.

== Villages ==
Village code	Name	Khmer
02120301	Kandal	កណ្តាល
02120302	Svay Chrum	ស្វាយជ្រំ
02120303	Ou Kokir	អូរគគីរ
02120304	Ou Da	អូរដា
02120305	Thmei	ថ្មី
02120306	Kampong Lei	កំពង់ឡី
02120307	Veal Lumphat	វាលលំផាត់
02120308	Mnoas Kal	ម្នាស់កាល់
02120309	Samraong	សំរោង
02120310	Tang Yu	តាំងយូ
