= Svay Pao =

Svay Pao ឃុំស្វាយប៉ោ
- Commune
- Interactive map of Svay Pao
- Country: Cambodia
- Province: Battambang Province
- District: Battambang District
- Villages: 4
- Time zone: UTC+07

Svay Pao (Khmer: ឃុំស្វាយប៉ោ) is a khum (commune) of Battambang District in Battambang Province in north-western Cambodia.

== Villages ==
- Preaek Moha Tep
- Kampong Krabei
- Mphey Osakphea
- Kammeakkar
