= Prey Chas =

Prey Chas ឃុំព្រៃចាស់
- Commune
- Location within Cambodia
- Coordinates: 13°18′N 103°24′E
- Country: Cambodia
- Province: Battambang Province
- District: Aek Phnum District
- Villages: 5
- Time zone: UTC+07
- Geocode: 020506

Prey Chas is a khum (commune) of Aek Phnum District in Battambang Province in north-western Cambodia.

== Villages ==
- Prey Chas
- Peam Seima
- Anlong Sandan
- Kaoh Chiveang
- Bak Prea
