= Boeng Reang =

Commune in Kamrieng District, Battambang Province, Cambodia

Boeng Reang ឃុំបឹងរាំង
- Commune
- Location within Cambodia
- Coordinates: 13°05′N 102°28′E
- Country: Cambodia
- Province: Battambang Province
- District: Kamrieng District
- Villages: 8
- Time zone: UTC+07
- Geocode: 021202

Boeng Reang (Khmer: ឃុំបឹងរាំង) is a khum (commune) of Kamrieng District in Battambang Province in north-western Cambodia.

== Villages ==
Village code	Name	Khmer
02120201	Doung	ដូង
02120202	Ou Da Leu	អូរដាលើ
02120203	Ou Krouch	អូរក្រូច
02120204	Svay	ស្វាយ
02120205	Svay Thum	ស្វាយធំ
02120206	Boeng Reang	បឹងរាំង
02120207	Preah Puth	ព្រះពុទ្ធ
02120208	Phnom Chap	ភ្នំចាប
