= Kdol Doun Teav =

Administrative division in Cambodia

Kdol Doun Teav ក្តុលដូនទាវ
- Commune
- Interactive map of Kdol Doun Teav
- Country: Cambodia
- Province: Battambang Province
- Municipality: Krong Battambang
- Villages: 7
- Time zone: UTC+07

Kdol Doun Teav (Khmer: សង្កាត់ក្តុលដូនទាវ) is a sangkat of Krong Battambang (previously, khum/commune of Battambang District) in Battambang Province in north-western Cambodia.

== Villages ==
- Chong Preaek
- Kdol
- Ou Ta Nob
- Ta Pruoch
- Ta Koy
- Kantuot
- Thkov
