= Phlov Meas =

Phlov Meas ឃុំផ្លូវមាស
- Commune
- Location within Cambodia
- Coordinates: 12°45′57″N 102°50′32″E
- Country: Cambodia
- Province: Battambang
- District: Rotanak Mondol
- Villages: 7
- Time zone: UTC+7 (ICT)
- Geocode: 020703

Phlov Meas (Khmer: ផ្លូវមាស [pʰlɨw miəh], meaning "Golden Road") is a commune (khum) in Rotanak Mondol District, Battambang Province in north-western Cambodia.

== Villages ==
- Phlov Meas
- Sek Sak
- Toek Sap
- Chi Pan
- Ou Treng
- Ou Da
- Ou Lmun
