= Bansay Traeng =

Coordinates: 13°16′N 103°02′E

Bansay Traeng ឃុំបន្សាយត្រែង
- Commune
- Interactive map of Bansay Traeng
- Country: Cambodia
- Province: Battambang Province
- District: Thma Koul District
- Villages: 8
- Time zone: UTC+07

Bansay Traeng (Khmer: ឃុំបន្សាយត្រែង) is a khum (commune) of Thma Koul District in Battambang Province in north-western Cambodia.

== Villages ==
Bansay Traeng contains eight villages.

Name	Khmer	Village code
Bansay Traeng	បន្សាយត្រែង	2020901
Ta Kay	តាកយ	2020902
Thmei	ថ្មី	2020903
Prey Leav	ព្រៃលាវ	2020904
Kaong Kang	កោងកាង	2020905
Thmea	ធ្មា	2020906
Spean	ស្ពាន	2020907
Tuol Ta Sokh	ទួលតាសុខ	2020908
