= Preaek Preah Sdach =

Preaek Preah Sdach ឃុំព្រែកព្រះស្តេច
- Commune
- Interactive map of Preaek Preah Sdach
- Country: Cambodia
- Province: Battambang Province
- District: Battambang District
- Villages: 8
- Time zone: UTC+07

Preaek Preah Sdach (ឃុំព្រែកព្រះស្តេច) is a khum (commune) of Battambang District in Battambang Province in north-western Cambodia.

== Villages ==
Preaek Preah Sdach contains eight villages.

Name	Khmer	Village code
Preaek Preah Sdach	ព្រែកព្រះស្តេច	2030201
Preaek Ta Tan	ព្រែកតាតន់	2030202
Dabbei Meakkakra	១៣ មករា	2030203
Ou Khcheay	អូរខ្ជាយ	2030204
La Edth	ឡឥដ្ឋ	2030205
Num Krieb	នំក្រៀប	2030206
Baek Chan Thmei	បែកចានថ្មី	2030207
Chamkar Ruessei	ចំការប្ញស្សី	2030208
