= Ou Ta Ki =

Coordinates: 13°09′N 103°07′E

Ou Ta Ki ឃុំអូរតាគី
- Commune
- Interactive map of Ou Ta Ki
- Country: Cambodia
- Province: Battambang Province
- District: Thma Koul District
- Villages: 8
- Time zone: UTC+07

Ou Ta Ki (Khmer: ឃុំអូរតាគី) is a khum (commune) of Thma Koul District in Battambang Province in north-western Cambodia.

== Villages ==
Ou Ta Ki contains seven villages.

Name	Khmer	Village code
Ou Ta Ki	អូរតាគី	2020301
Popeal Khae	ពពាលខែ	2020302
Veal Trea	វាលទ្រា	2020303
Tras	ត្រស់	2020304
Prey Totueng	ព្រៃទទឹង	2020305
Prey Dach	ព្រៃដាច់	2020306
Trang	ត្រាង	2020307
Kakaoh	កកោះ	2020308
