= Chamkar Samraong =

Sangkat in Krong Battambang, Cambodia

Chamkar Samraong ចំការសំរោង
- Sangkat
- Location within Cambodia
- Coordinates: 13°07′17″N 103°11′05″E
- Country: Cambodia
- Province: Battambang Province
- Municipality: Battambang Municipality
- Villages: 5
- Time zone: UTC+07
- Geocode: 020304

Chamkar Samraong (Khmer: ចំការសំរោង) is a sangkat (previously khum/commune) of Battambang Municipality (previously Battambang District) in Battambang Province in north-western Cambodia.

== Villages ==
Chamkar Samraong contains five villages.

| Name | Khmer | Village code |
|---|---|---|
| Chamkar Samraong Muoy | ចំការសំរោង ១ | 2030401 |
| Chamkar Samraong Pir | ចំការសំរោង ២ | 2030402 |
| Voat Lieb | វត្តលៀប | 2030403 |
| Voat Rumduol | វត្តរំដួល | 2030404 |
| Phka Sla | ផ្កាស្លា | 2030405 |
