= Ampil Pram Daeum =

Ampil Pram Daeum ឃុំអំពិលប្រាំដើម
- Commune
- Location within Cambodia
- Coordinates: 13.267°N 102.767°E
- Country: Cambodia
- Province: Battambang Province
- District: Bavel District
- Villages: 8
- Time zone: UTC+07

Ampil Pram Daeum (Khmer: ឃុំអំពិលប្រាំដើម) is a khum (community) of Bavel District in Battambang Province in north-western Cambodia.

== Villages ==
- Dangkao Kramang
- Siem
- Ampil
- Sthapor
- Ta Khiev
- Buo Run
- Doung
- Sthab Por Pi
