= Chrey, Thma Koul =

Commune inThma Koul District, Battambang Province, Cambodia

Chrey ឃុំជ្រៃ
- Commune
- Location within Cambodia
- Coordinates: 13°06′56″N 103°06′23″E
- Country: Cambodia
- Province: Battambang Province
- District: Thma Koul District
- Villages: 10
- Time zone: UTC+07
- Geocode: 020204

Chrey (Khmer: ឃុំជ្រៃ) is a khum (commune) of Thma Koul District in Battambang Province in north-western Cambodia.

== Villages ==
Chrey contains ten villages.

Name	Khmer	Village code
Chrey Thmei	ជ្រៃថ្មី	2020401
Chrey	ជ្រៃ	2020402
Ka Kou	កគោ	2020403
Svay Chrum	ស្វាយជ្រំ	2020404
Kbal Khmaoch	ក្បាលខ្មោច	2020405
Prey Totueng	ព្រៃទទឹង	2020406
Hai San	ហៃសាន	2020407
Popeal Khae	ពពាលខែ	2020408
Anlong Run	អន្លង់រុន	2020409
Kruos	គ្រួស	2020410
