= Ta Pung =

Coordinates: 13°15′N 103°05′E

Ta Pung ឃុំតាពូង
- Commune
- Interactive map of Ta Pung
- Country: Cambodia
- Province: Battambang Province
- District: Thma Koul District
- Villages: 11
- Time zone: UTC+07

Ta Pung (Khmer: ឃុំតាពូង) is a khum (commune) of Thma Koul District in Battambang Province in north-western Cambodia.

== Villages ==
Ta Pung has seven villages.

Name	Khmer	Village code
Thma Koul Tboung	ថ្មគោលត្បូង	2020101
Paoy Yong	ប៉ោយយង់	2020102
Kaksekam	កសិកម្ម	2020103
Paoy Samraong	ប៉ោយសំរោង	2020104
Kouk Kduoch	គោកក្តួច	2020105
Ang Tboung	អង់ត្បូង	2020106
Tumpung Tboung	ទំពូងត្បូង	2020107
