= Kaoh Chiveang =

Commune in Aek Phnum District, Battambang Province, Cambodia

Coordinates: 13°14′N 103°39′E

Kaoh Chiveang ឃុំកោះជីវាំង
- Commune
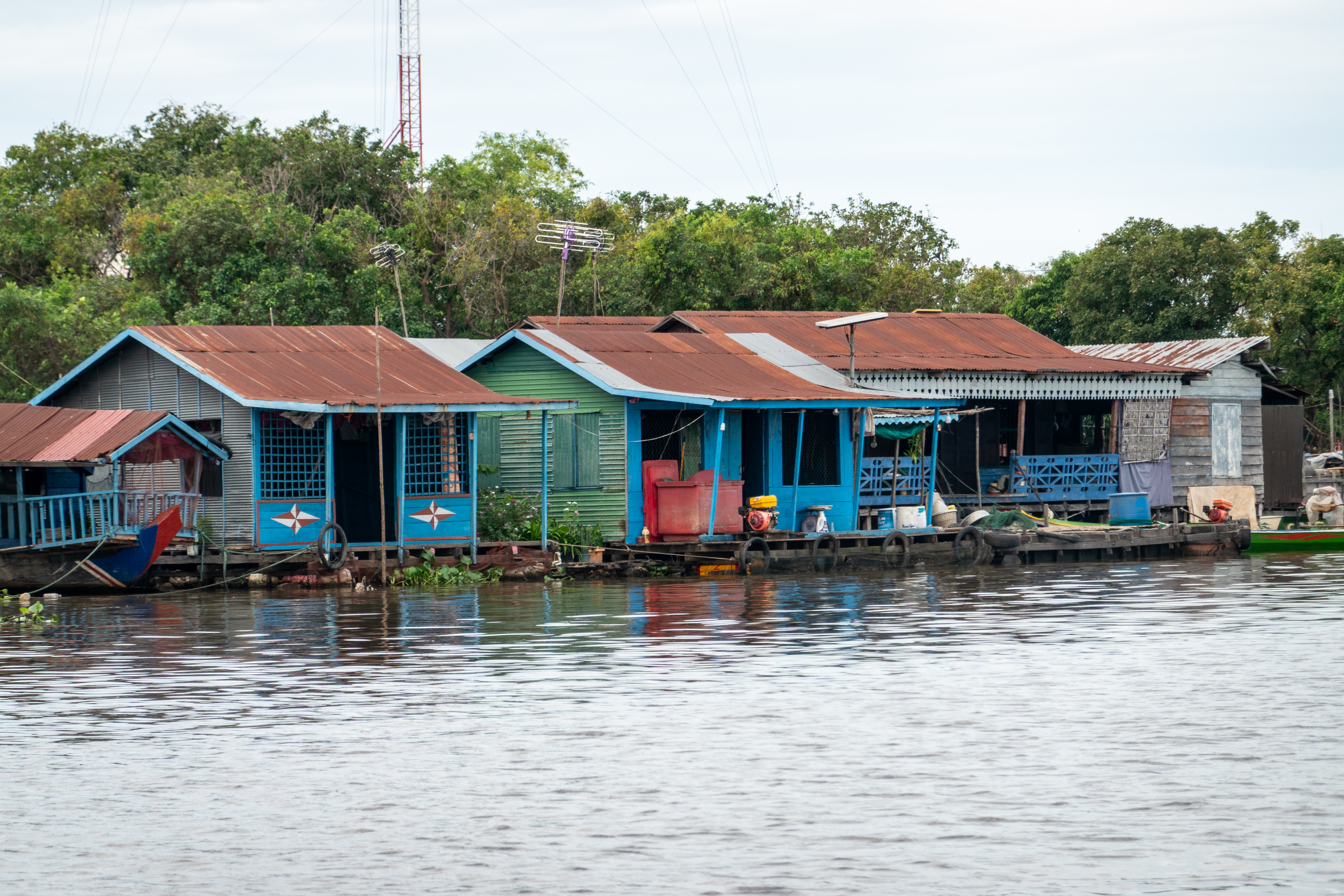
- Khum Koh Chiveang Floating Village
- Interactive map of Kaoh Chiveang
- Country: Cambodia
- Province: Battambang Province
- District: Aek Phnum District
- Villages: 5
- Time zone: UTC+07

Kaoh Chiveang (Khmer: ឃុំកោះជីវាំង) is a khum (commune) of Aek Phnum District in Battambang Province in north-western Cambodia.

== Villages ==
- Thvang
- Kampong Prahok
- Anlong Ta Uor
- Preaek Toal
- Kbal Taol
