= Sla Kaet =

Coordinates: 13°08′N 103°13′E

Sla Kaet ស្លាកែត
- Commune
- Interactive map of Sla Kaet
- Country: Cambodia
- Province: Battambang
- Municipality: Battambang
- Time zone: UTC+7 (ICT)

Sla Kaet (Khmer: ស្លាកែត) is a commune (sangkat) of Battambang Municipality in Battambang Province in north-western Cambodia.

== Villages ==
Sla Kaet contains three villages.

Name	Khmer	Village code
Sla Kaet	ស្លាកែត	2030501
Dam Spey	ដាំស្ពៃ	2030502
Chrey Kaong	ជ្រៃកោង	2030503
