= Wat Banan =

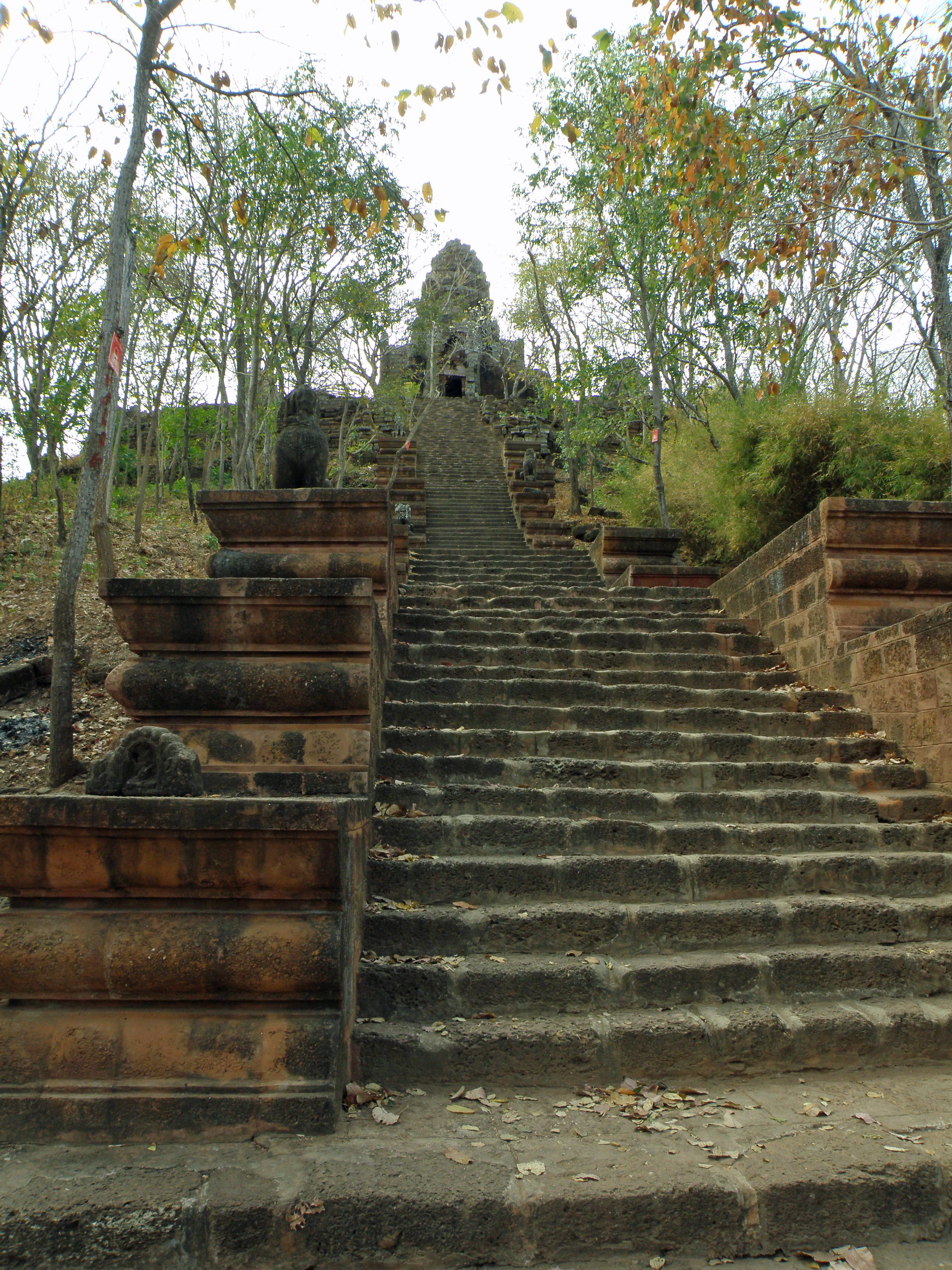
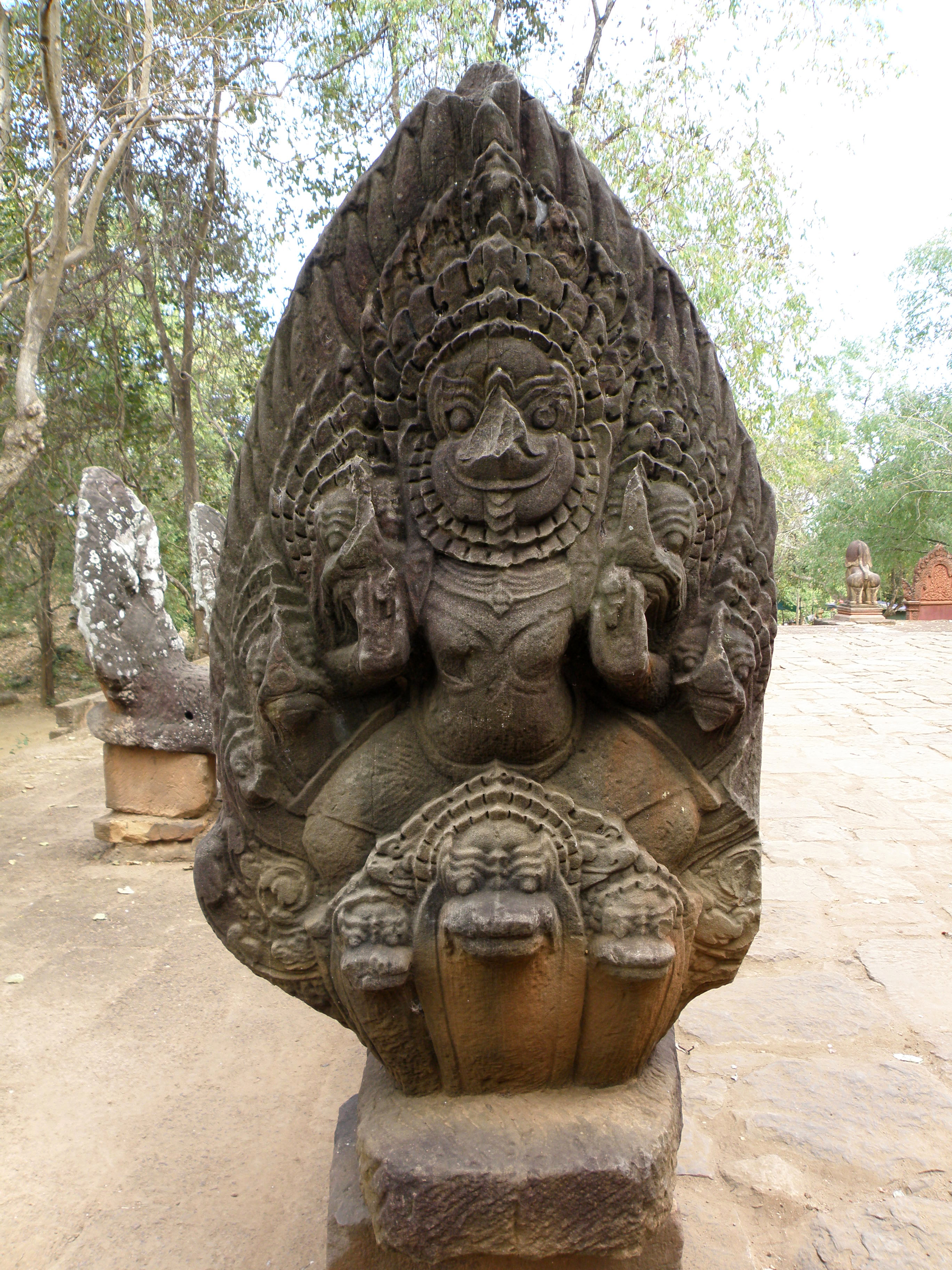

Wat Banan (Khmer: ភ្នំបាណន់) is the best-preserved of the Khmer temples in Battambang Province. The distinctive five towers of the temple are similar to the much larger and more famous temple of Angkor Wat. At the base of the mountain, is a step laterite staircase flanked by nagas.

== History ==
The 11th century temple was built by King Udayadityavarman II (Khmer: ឧតយាទិត្យវរ្ម័ន២) son of King Suryavarman I (Khmer: សូរ្យវរ្ម័នទី១) and despite some looting it is in a considerably better state of repair than Wat Ek Phnom. It was built to give thanks, ask for help, and pray to God. In that era, they had a strong belief in god, especially Hindu gods.

However, Udayadityavarman was Shaivite and the sculptures of Phnom Banan are mainly Buddhist. As they were later on defaced like those in Angkor, it's highly likely that the Buddhist temple was the result of a temple rebuilding under Jayavarman VII in the late 12th century.
