= Chath Piersath =

Cambodian-American poet, painter and humanitarian

Chath Piersath, born in Kop Nymit, Svay Sisophon District, in Battambang Province, is a noted Cambodian American poet, painter and humanitarian. He creates both large and small portraits of people from his memory, often representing the social and economic disparity among Cambodians.

== Biography ==
Chath pierSath crossed the Thai-Cambodian border in 1979 at the end of the Khmer Rouge period with members of his family to Aranyaprathet Refugee Camp. With the aid of his aunt, he, his older brother and sister emigrated to the United States in 1981 and lived first in Boulder, Colorado. He graduated from World College West/New College of California, majoring in international service and development.

Much of his poetry deals with his macabre memories of the Khmer Rouge atrocities and the massacres of the Killing Fields; his poem "A Letter to My Mother" was published by the Yale University Press in 1997. His other works also appear in Anthologies of the Merrimack Valley Press of Lowell, Massachusetts. His recent works include "After" a book of poetry, published by Abingdon Square Publishing on 15 October 2009 and a children's book, Sinat and the Instrument of the Heart, published by Soundprints.

He returned to Cambodia in 1994 for the first time after ten years of separation from family members and his homeland to do humanitarian work as a volunteer of the Cambodian American National Development Organization (CANDO). He was assigned to assist a local human rights organization, Human Rights Vigilance of Cambodia. He also helped an array of other local NGOs working on HIV/AIDS Prevention education and child rights issues. One of his exhibitions at the Java Cafe in Phnom Penh and also in Bangkok, Thailand and Kunming, China addressed those living with HIV and AIDS. He currently spends six months of the year working and living on a farm in his adopted country, the United States, and six months in Phnom Penh, Cambodia, as a painter and writer.

== Publications ==
- This Body Mystery: paintings and poems, Abingdon Square Publishing, 2012.
- "Mother & Son," River Muse:Tales of Lowell & The Merrimack Valley: an Anthology, Lloyd L. Corricelli & David Daniel, editors, Sons of Liberty, 2011.
- After: a book of poetry, Abingdon Square Publishing, 2009.
- Sinat and the Instrument of the Heart by Chath pierSath, illus. by Vann Nath and Phal Phouriseth, Southprints, 2009.
- Encyclopedia of Asian American Artists: Artists of the American Mosaic, by Kara Kelley Halllmark, Greenwood Press, 2007.
- "Poems and journal," http://ecommunity.uml.edu/bridge/reviews5/piersath/index.htm, 1997.
- "Where the Road Begins, an anthology" - Cultural Organization of Lowell (COOL). Kathy Devlin, Matthew Miller, LZ Nunn and Gigi Thibodeau, eds. 2007.
- "The way I want to remember my Cambodia," - The Merrimack Literary Review. Ron Rowland & Grey Water, eds. 2004.
- "Inching toward acceptance," Commonwealth Magazine, June 2002.
- Soul Survivors: stories of women and children in Cambodia, by Carol Wagner, Creative Arts Book Company, 2002.
- "An Invocation for Cambodia," Prayers of a Thousand Years. Elizabeth J. Roberts and Elias Amidon, eds. 1999.
- "Letter to my mother," Children of the Killing Fields: Memoirs of survivors. Compiled by Dith Pran, edited by Kim DePaul, ed. 1994.
