= Kamrieng (commune) =

Kamrieng ឃុំកំរៀង
- Commune
- Location within Cambodia
- Coordinates: 13°01′57″N 102°32′15″E
- Country: Cambodia
- Province: Battambang Province
- District: Kamrieng District
- Villages: 8
- Time zone: UTC+07
- Geocode: 021201

Kamrieng is a khum (commune) of Kamrieng District in Battambang Province in north-western Cambodia.

== Villages ==
Village code	Name	Khmer
02120101	Kamrieng	កំរៀង
02120102	Svay Veaeng	ស្វាយរែង
02120103	Svay Sa	ស្វាយស
02120104	Sralau Tong	ស្រឡៅទង
02120105	Ou Chrey	អូរជ្រៃ
02120106	Roka Bos	រកាបុស
02120107	Lak Hokpir	ឡាក់ហុកពីរ
02120108	Boeng Ou Cheang	បឹងអូរជាង
