= Rotanak Mondol District =

Rotanak Mondol ស្រុករតនមណ្ឌល
- District (srok)
- Interactive map of Rotanak Mondol
- Country: Cambodia
- Province: Battambang
- Communes: 4

Population (1998)
  - Total: 23,919
- Time zone: UTC+7 (ICT)

Rotanak Mondol (Khmer: រតនមណ្ឌល [rɔtanaʔ mɔnɗɔl], "Precious Mandala") is a district (srok) in Battambang Province, in north-western Cambodia.

== Administration ==
The district is subdivided into 4 communes (khum).

=== Communes and villages ===
Khum (Commune)	Phum (Villages)
Sdau	Banang, Sdau, Chamkar Lmut, Boeng Ampil, Dangkot, Doun Meay, Baribou, Koak Chhor, Reak Smey Sangha, Neang Lem, Angdoek Dobmouy, Pich Chanva, Badak Tboang, Badak Chhoeung, Ou Dai Khla, O Khmum
Andaeuk Haeb	Andaeuk Haeb, Svay Chuor, Thma Prus, Serei Voan, Prey Ampor, Kandal Steung, Thvak
Phlov Meas	Phlov Meas, Sek Sak, Tuek Sab, Chi Pan, Ou Treng, Ou Da, Ou Lmun
Traeng	Kilou, Phcheav, Chea Montrei, Chi Sang, Kilou Samprambei, Svay Sa, Ta Krok
