= Boeng Pring =

Commune in Thma Koul District, Battambang Province, Cambodia

Coordinates: 13°22′N 103°02′E

Boeng Pring ឃុំបឹងព្រីង
- Commune
- Interactive map of Boeng Pring
- Country: Cambodia
- Province: Battambang Province
- District: Thma Koul District
- Villages: 3
- Time zone: UTC+07

Boeng Pring (Khmer: ឃុំបឹងព្រីង) is a khum (commune) of Thma Koul District in Battambang Province in north-western Cambodia.

== Villages ==
Boeng Pring contains four villages.

Name	Khmer	Village code
Boeng Pring	បឹងព្រីង	2020701
Ou Nhor	អូរញរ	2020702
Snuol Kaong	ស្នូលកោង	2020703
Paoy Ta Sek	ប៉ោយតាសេក	2020704
