= Norry =

Improvised narrow-gauge train in Cambodia

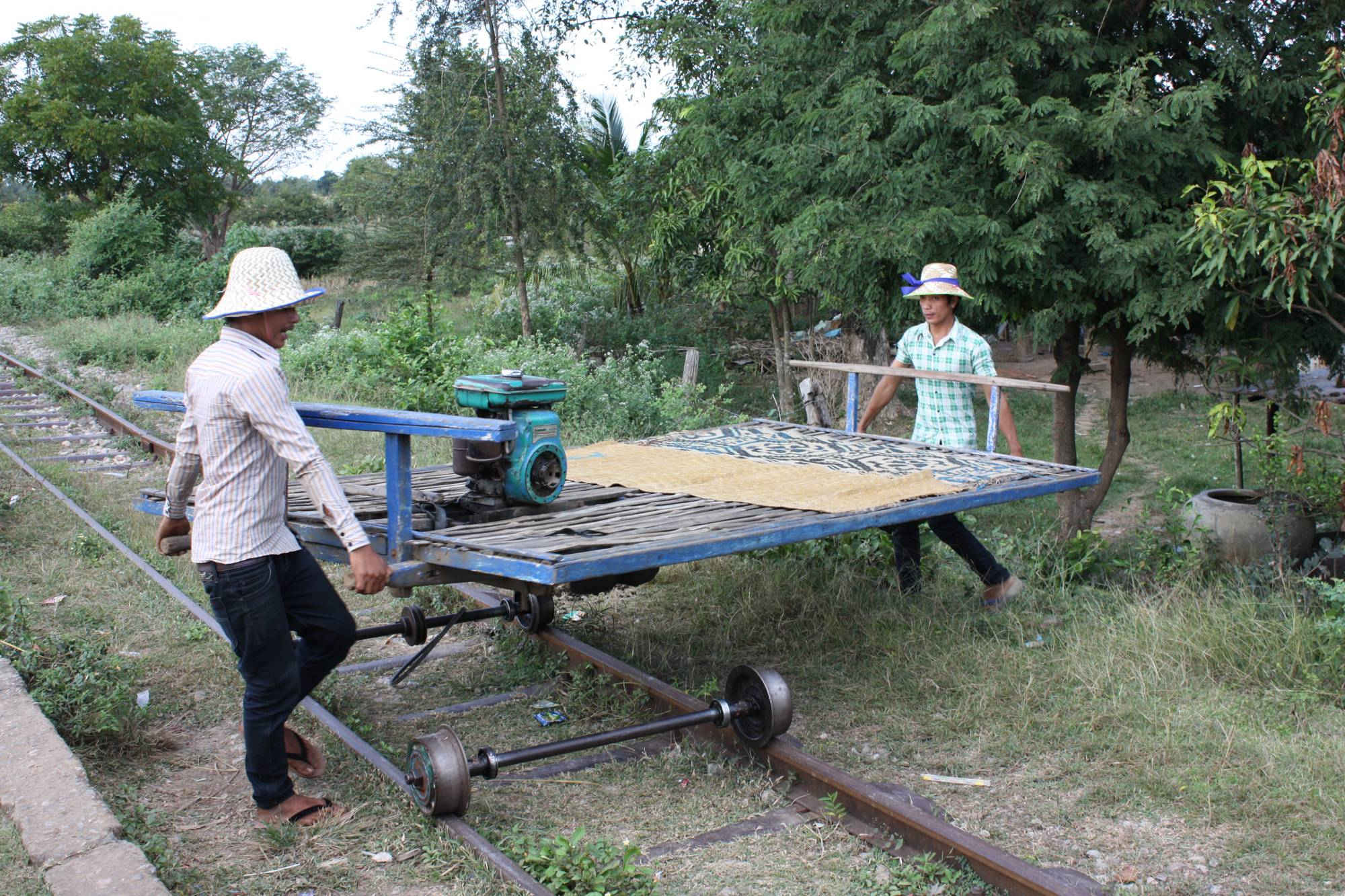
A norry being disassembled

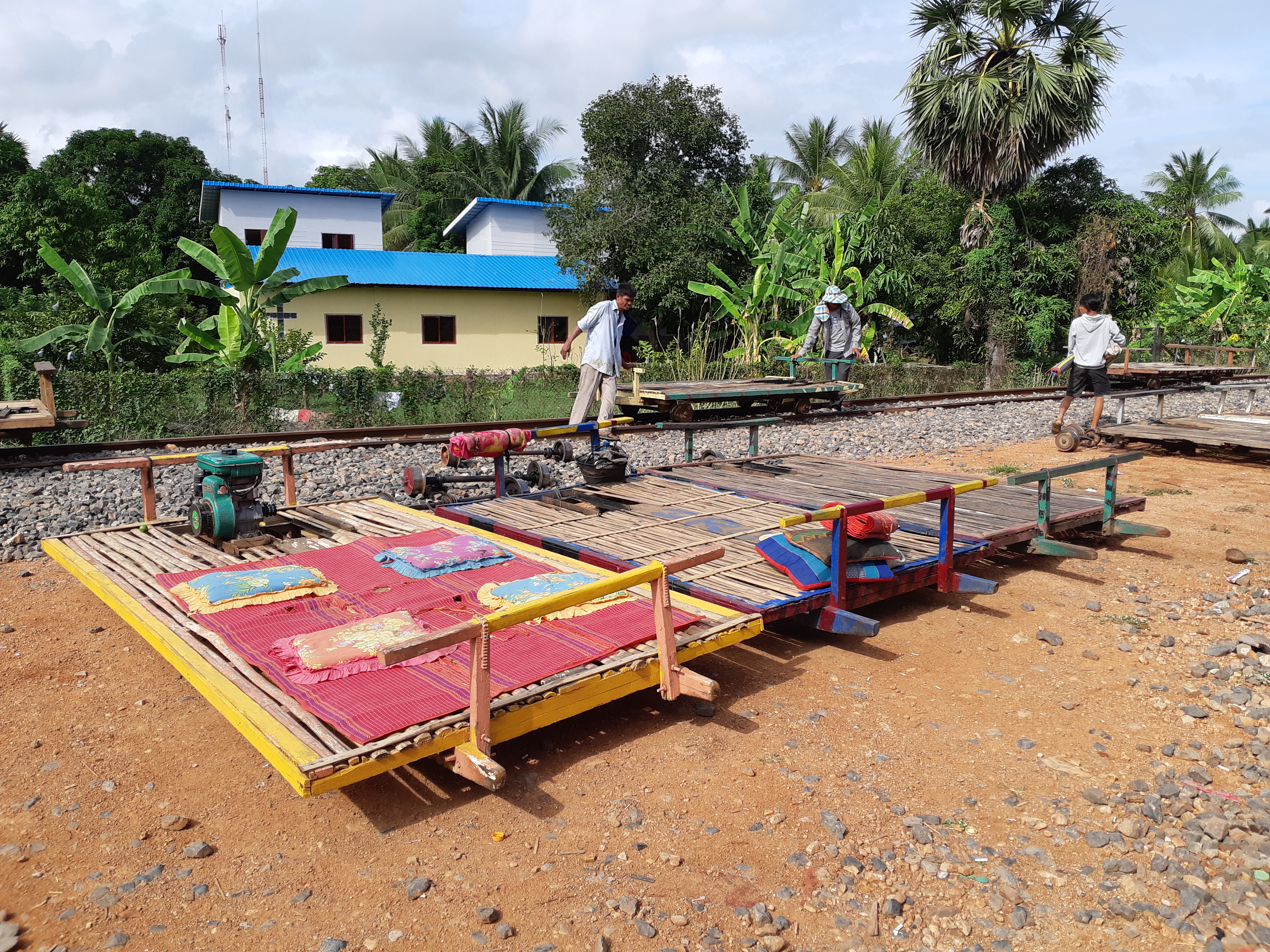

A norry or nori (Khmer: ណូរី, Nori [nouriː], from the French word for lorry) was an improvised rail vehicle service from Cambodia. Lonely Planet describes it as "Cambodia's bamboo train". The trains ran at speeds of up to 50 km/h (31 mph) on the metre-gauge railway tracks around Battambang and Poipet. A scheduled service run by the Government also operates, but is slower at 30 km/h (19 mph). The rest of the network, originally built by the French colonial government, is largely abandoned, after the Khmer Rouge regime effectively shut it down. In 2006 the BBC reported that there was only one scheduled service a week and it ran at not much more than walking pace.

By October 2017 the bamboo train was no longer available in its original form due to the resumption of rail service between Poipet and Phnom Penh. However, the bamboo train was rebuilt near Wat Banan in order to cater to the local tourism industry. The relocated site opened in the middle of January 2018.

== Origins ==
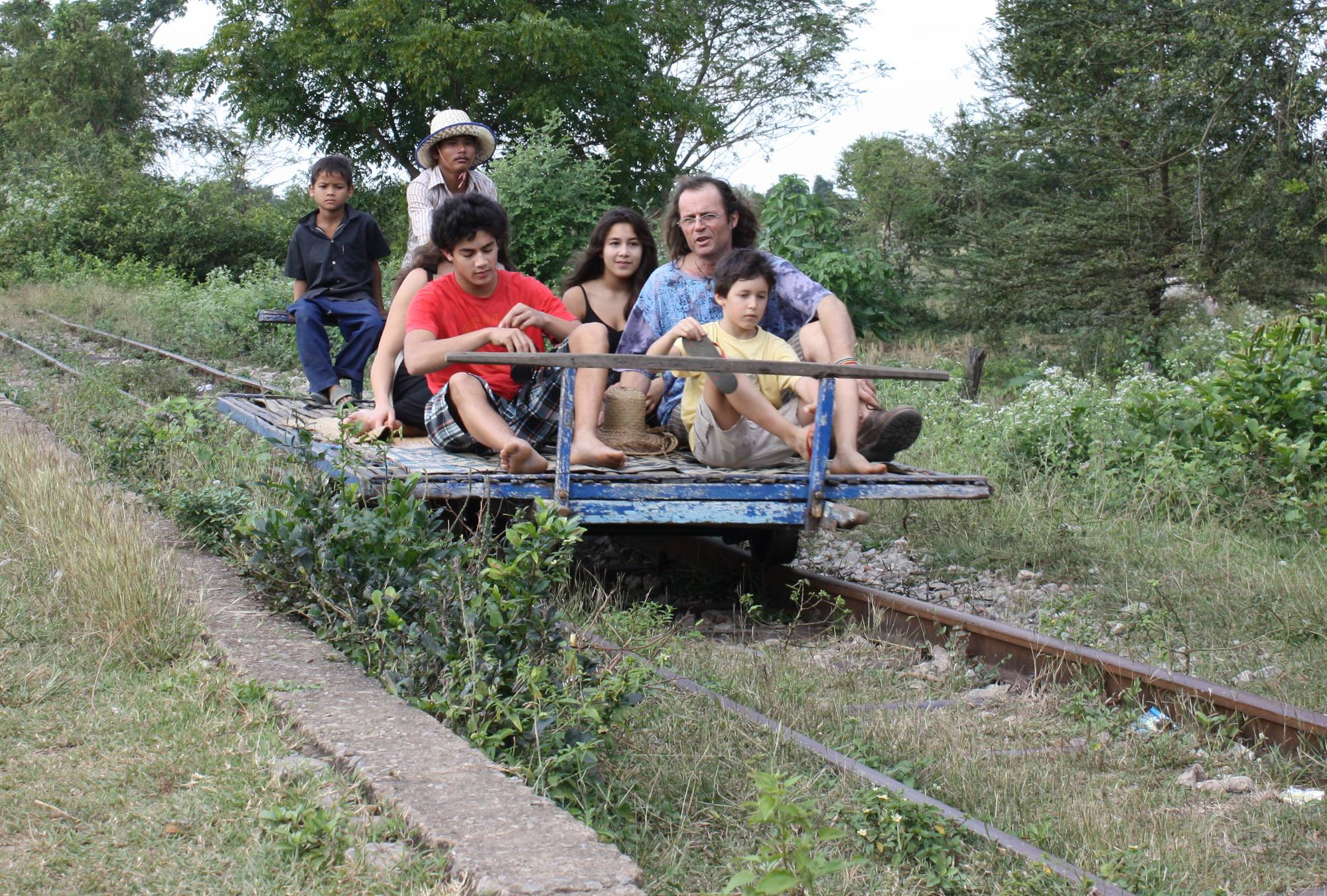
The bamboo train is a popular tourist attraction in Battambang

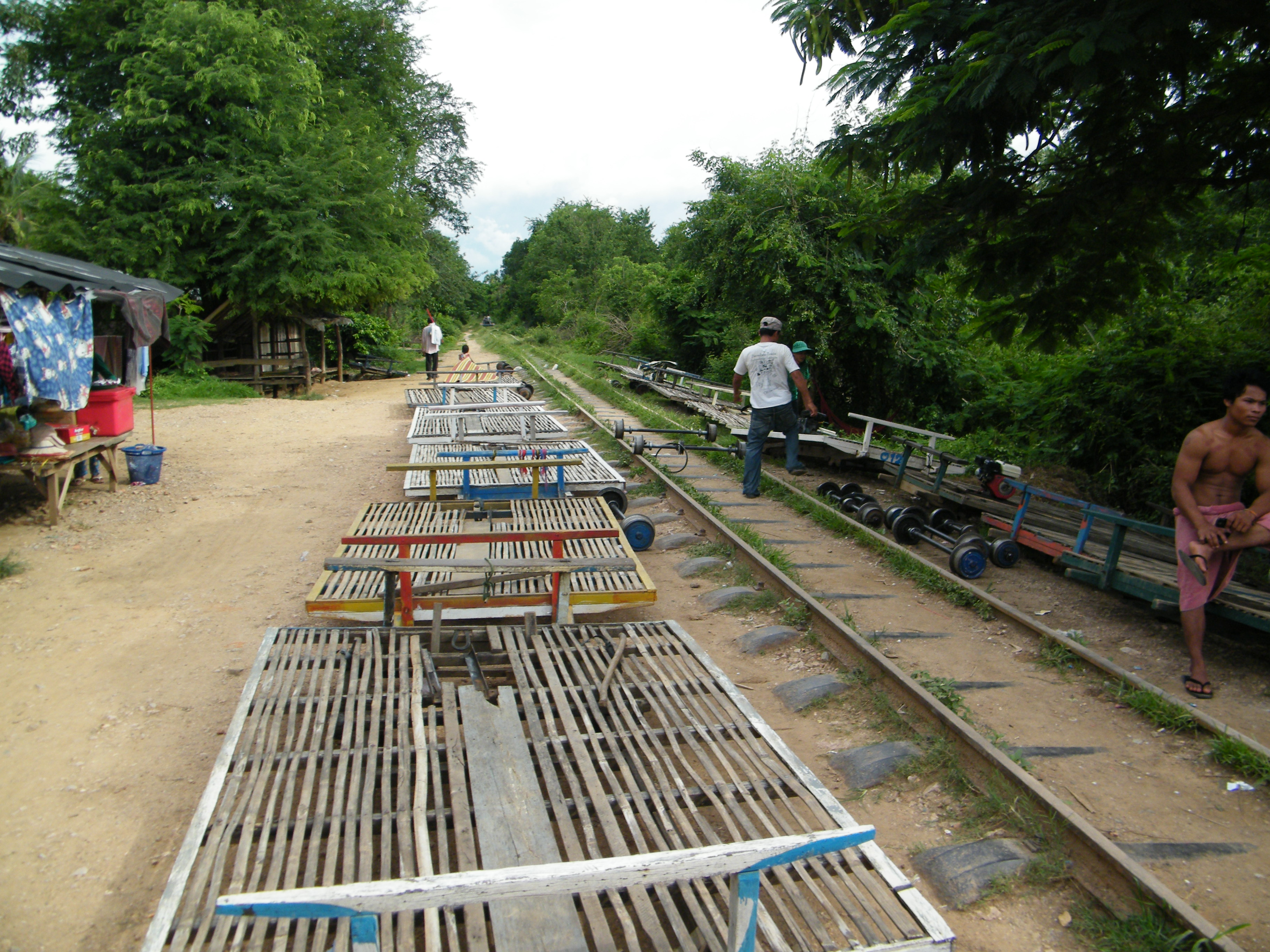
Bamboo train (Norry) station near Battambang

Video clip of norry in operation.

Norries had low fares, and were frequent and relatively fast, so they were popular despite their rudimentary design, lack of brakes, the state of the rails (often broken or warped) and the lack of any formal operating system. Its simple construction and light weight means that a norry could be easily removed from the track – if two meet on the line, the one with the lighter load is removed from the rails and carried round the other. At the end of the line the vehicle would be lifted and turned. In August 2016, Norry has been developed with braking system.

There was precedent for the Norry's popularity. In the 1980s and 1990s, due to the Cambodian Civil War, trains were led by an armed and armoured carriage; the first carriages of the train were flatbeds used as mine sweepers, and travel on these was free for the first carriage and half-price for the second. These options were popular despite the obvious risks.

Norry construction is a cottage industry conducted in trackside villages. It takes around four days to construct one of the vehicles, which have a steel frame overlaid with bamboo slats resting on wheels taken from abandoned tanks. Originally propelled by hand using punt poles, they were later powered by small motorcycle or tractor engines with belt drive direct to the rear axle, delivering top speeds of 40 km/h (25 mph) or more. Fuel was bought from villages along the route, supplied in glass jars and the flat-bedded vehicles will carry any load that will fit, including people, livestock, motorcycles and rice.

In May 2011 the bamboo train was the only train operating around the Battambang area, which could be observed by the completely overgrown tracks passing through the city. On the outskirts a tourist service operates for $5 per person to a village that has a brick factory. This was overseen by the local Tourist Police. Some families run small shops here where you can buy a cold drink or a "Ride the Battambang Bamboo train" t-shirt.

As late as January 2014 there was still a bamboo train ride in Pursat, which led southeast out of the city for about an hour for a fare of 20,000 ៛ riels (US$5) per person.

== Current Operations ==
In January 2018 the 'new bamboo train' was opened, now located more than 20 km (12 mi) from the city. The line starts near the base of Phnom Banan -- a hill that houses an Angkorian temple -- and ends 4 km (2.5 mi) down the line at Chhoeuteal commune. Despite concerns that the new bamboo train was no longer 'authentic' and that it was located too far from town, it has been credited with increasing tourism for the province, with Battambang welcoming 670,000 tourists in -- an 8% increase -- in 2018.

== See also ==
- Rail transport in Cambodia
- Railroad speeder
- Draisine
- Taiwanese push car railways
