= Battambang Municipality =

Municipality of Cambodia

Battambang municipality ក្រុងបាត់ដំបង Krong Battambang
- Municipality
- District location in Battambang Province
- Coordinates: 13°5′N 103°5′E
- Country: Cambodia
- Province: Battambang
- Communes: 10
- Capital: Battambang

Population (1998)
  - Total: 116,793
- Time zone: UTC+7 (ICT)
- Postal code: service pick up 012 22 85 78

Battambang municipality (Khmer: ក្រុងបាត់ដំបង; Krong Battambang) is a municipality (krong) of Battambang province, in north-western Cambodia. The provincial capital Battambang lies within the municipality.

== Administration ==
The district is subdivided into 10 communes (khum).

=== Communes and villages ===
Khum (Commune)	Phum (Villages)
Tuol Ta Aek	Ou Ta Kam Muoy, Ou Ta Kam Pir, Ou Ta Kam Bei, Tuol Ta Aek, Dangkao Teab
Preaek Preah Sdach	Preaek Preah Sdach, Preaek Ta Tan, Dabbei Meakkakra, Ou Khcheay, La Edth, Num Krieb, Baek Chan Thmei, Chamkar Ruessei
Rotanak	Rumchek Muoy, Rumchek Pir, Rumchek Bei, Rumchek Buon, Rumchek Pram, Souphi Muoy, Souphi Pir, Rotanak
Chamkar Samraong	Chamkar Samraong Muoy, Chamkar Samraong Pir, Voat Lieb, Voat Rumduol, Phka Sla
Sla Kaet	Sla Kaet, Dam Spey, Chrey Kaong
Kdol Doun Teav	Chong Preaek, Kdol, Ou Ta Nob, Ta Pruoch, Ta Koy, Kantuot, Thkov
Ou Mal	Ou Mal, Dak Sasar, Sala Balat, Prey Dach, Kouk Ponley, Voat Roka, Koun Sek, Andoung Pring, Boeng Reang, Prey Roka
Voat Kor	Voat Kor, Chrab Krasang, Ballang, Khsach Pouy, Damnak Luong, Kampong Seima
Ou Char	Ou Char, Prey Koun Sek, Kab Kou Thmei, Andoung Chenh, Anhchanh, Ang
Svay Pao	Preaek Moha Tep, Kampong Krabei, Mphey Osakphea, Kammeakkar
