= Taiwanese push car railways =

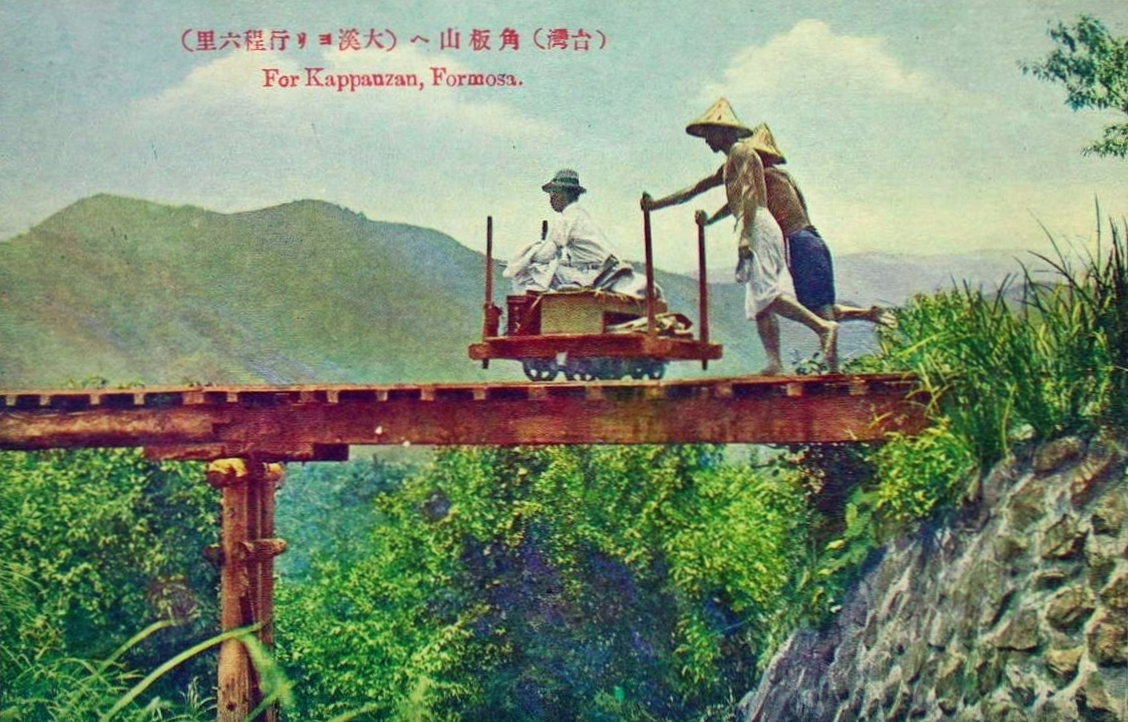
Taiwanese push car railway.

Taiwanese push car railways (Chinese: 台車; pinyin: Táichē) or Taiwanese bamboo train (Chinese: 台灣式竹火車; pinyin: Táiwānshì Zhúhuǒchē) were a historic human-powered transportation system on Taiwan, based on Japan's daisha push car railways. After Taiwan was ceded to Japan, the push car system was brought to Taiwan. The push car railways were in general service from 1895 to the late 1940s. The push cars complemented the developing steam locomotive system on Taiwan.

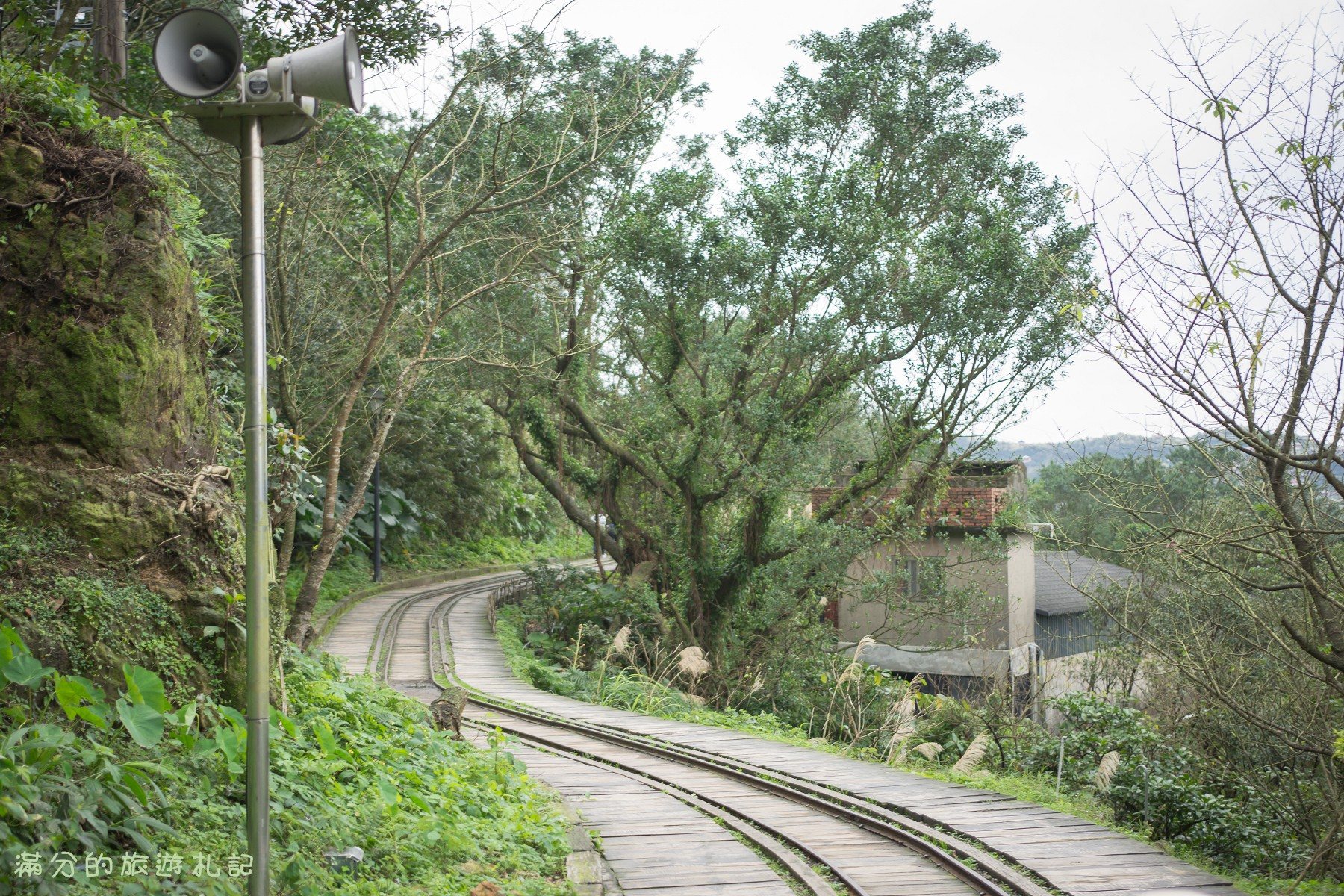
Abandoned light railway near Jinguashi gold mine

Push cars in Taiwan moved both passengers and freight on 45 to 50 cm narrow gauge railways. They had four small railway wheels, and two poles for pushing. Standard passenger cars seated two, and larger four; freight cars could carry up to 450 pounds (204 kg).

The first push car line in Taiwan was completed in December 1895, running from Tainan to Kaohsiung. The network expanded across all of western coastal Taiwan, regardless of terrain, from Taipei to Kaohsiung. Reaching its peak during the late 1920s to mid-1930s, it was gradually replaced by modern road systems that often ran parallel to the old tracks.

== See also ==
- Draisine
- Hand car
- Norry
