= Thma Koul District =

Coordinates: 13.2833°N 103.1000°E

Thma Koul ស្រុកថ្មគោល
- District (srok)
- Country: Cambodia
- Province: Battambang
- Communes: 10
- Time zone: UTC+7 (ICT)

Thma Koul (Khmer: ថ្មគោល [tʰmɑː koul], lit. "Terminal Stone") is a district (srok) of Battambang Province, in north-western Cambodia.

== Administration ==
The district is subdivided into 10 communes (khum).

=== Communes and villages ===
As of 2020.

Khum (Commune)	Phum (Villages)
Ta Pung	Thma Koul Tboung, Paoy Yong, Kaksekam, Paoy Samraong, Kouk Kduoch, Ang Tboung, Tumpung Tboung
Ta Meun	Thma Koul Cheung, Kouk Trab, Tumneab, Ta Sei, Chrouy Mtes, Krasang, Samraong, Thmei, Ang Cheung, Tumpung Cheung
Ou Ta Ki	Ou Ta Ki, Popeal Khae, Veal Trea, Tras, Prey Totueng, Prey Dach, Trang, Kakaoh
Chrey	Chrey Thmei, Chrey, Ka Kou, Svay Chrum, Kbal Khmaoch, Prey Totueng, Hai San, Popeal Khae, Anlong Run, Kruos
Anlong Run	Char, Sla Slak, Chab Kab, Souphi, Kruos
Chrouy Sdau	Chrouy Sdau, Nikom Krau, Nikom Knong, Nikom Kandal
Boeng Pring	Boeng Pring, Ou Nhor, Snuol Kaong, Paoy Ta Sek
Kouk Khmum	Kien Kaes 1, Kien Kaes 2, Ta Meakh, Chranieng, Kouk Khmum, Kandal Tboung, Kandal Cheung, Chhkae Koun
Bansay Traeng	Bansay Traeng, Ta Kay, Thmei, Prey Leav, Kaong Kang, Thmea, Spean, Tuol Ta Sokh
Rung Chrey	Ballangk Kraom, Prakeab, Kouk Khpos, Paoy Rumchey, Preah Ponlea, Rung Chrey, Tuol
