= Aek Phnum District =

Coordinates: 13.0833°N 103.0830°E

Aek Phnom ស្រុកឯកភ្នំ
- District (srok)
- Interactive map of Aek Phnom
- Country: Cambodia
- Province: Battambang
- Communes: 7

Population (1998)
  - Total: 65,408
- Time zone: +7

Ek Phnom (Khmer: ស្រុកឯកភ្នំ, "First Mountain") is a district (srok) of Battambang Province, in north western Cambodia. The name means "only hill" in Khmer.

== Administration ==
The district is subdivided into 7 communes (khum).

=== Communes and villages ===
Khum (Commune)	Phum (Villages)
Preaek Norint	Preaek Ta Chraeng, Preaek Krouch, Svay Chrum, Preaek Norint, Sdei, Rohal Suong, Duong Mea, Reach Doun Kaev, Ansang Sak, Preaek Trab
Samraong Knong	Samraong Knong, Kampong Sambuor, Samraong Snao, Samraong Ou Trea, Samraong Ta Kok
Preaek Khpob	Preaek Snao, Preaek Khpos, Sna Pi Mukh, Khvet, Ou Kambot
Preaek Luong	Preaek Luong, Sdei Leu, Sdei Kraom, Rohal Suong, Bak Amraek, Doun Ent, Bak Roteh
Peam Aek	Doun Teav, Suos Ei, Peam Aek, Kong Tum, Ka Rohal, Preaek Chdaor, Ta Kom, Kouk Doung
Prey Chas	Prey Chas, Peam Seima, Anlong Sandan, Kaoh Chiveang, Bak Prea
Kaoh Chiveang	Kampong Prahok, Anlong Ta Uor, Preaek Toal, Kbal Taol
