= Rukhak Kiri district =

Rukh Kiri រុក្ខគិរី
- District (srok)
- Interactive map of Rukh Kiri
- Country: Cambodia
- Province: Battambang
- Communes: 5
- Villages: 32
- Time zone: +7

Rukhak Kiri (Khmer: រុក្ខគិរី) is a district (srok) of Battambang province, in north-western Cambodia.

== Administration ==
The district is subdivided into 5 communes (khum).

=== Communes and villages ===
Khum (commune)	Phum (villages)
Prek Chik	Seim, Khnach Ampor, Chke Kham Prues, Prek Ta Ven, Prek Chik, Ou Rumcheck, Thnam
Prey Tralach	Chong Por, Paen, Prey Khlout, Prey Tralach, Roung, Srah That, Roung Pir
Mukh Reah	Srah Kuy, Mukh Rea Pir, Svay Ya, Tuol Svay, Ta Preat, Mukh Rea Muoy, Danghao
Sdok Pravoek	Sdok Pravuek, Kaoh Thum, Preah Andoung, Tuol Kokir, Prey Ampoan, Pralay Dabprambei
Basak	Chhuk, Basak, Kamraeng, Ta Preal, Chrang Khpos
