= Kamrieng district =

Coordinates: 13°05′20″N 102°28′54″E

Kamrieng កំរៀង
- District (srok)
- Interactive map of Kamrieng
- Country: Cambodia
- Province: Battambang
- Communes: 6

Population (1998)
  - Total: 14,215
- Time zone: +7

Kamrieng (Khmer: កំរៀង) is a district (srok) of Battambang province, in north-western Cambodia.

== Administration ==
The district is subdivided into 6 communes (khum).

=== Communes and villages ===
| Khum (commune) | Phum (villages) |
|---|---|
| Kamrieng | Kamrieng, Svay Veaeng, Svay Sa, Sralau Tong, Ouchrey, Rokabos, Lakhokpi, Bangorchang |
| Boeng Reang | Doung, Ou Da Leu, Ou Krouch, Boeng Reang, Svay Thum, Prahpout, Svay |
| Ou Da | Kandal, Svay Chrum, Ou KoKir, Ou Da, Thmei, Lamphat, Manaskal, Tangyou, Samroung, Kampanglay |
| Trang | Trang, Kandal, Svay Prey, Thmei, Lvea Te, Ta Saen, Ou Koki, Ourchambak, Phnommoyrouy |
| Ta Saen | Dei Kraham, Ou Chamlang, Ou Anlok, Ou Toek Thla |
| Ta Krai | Sam Sip, Kampong Chamlong Loeu, Kam Prang, Toul Til, Ta Krai, Dam Naksala, Sras Toeuk Thmey, Sras Kampot, Kampong Chamlong Krom |
