= Wat Ek Phnom =

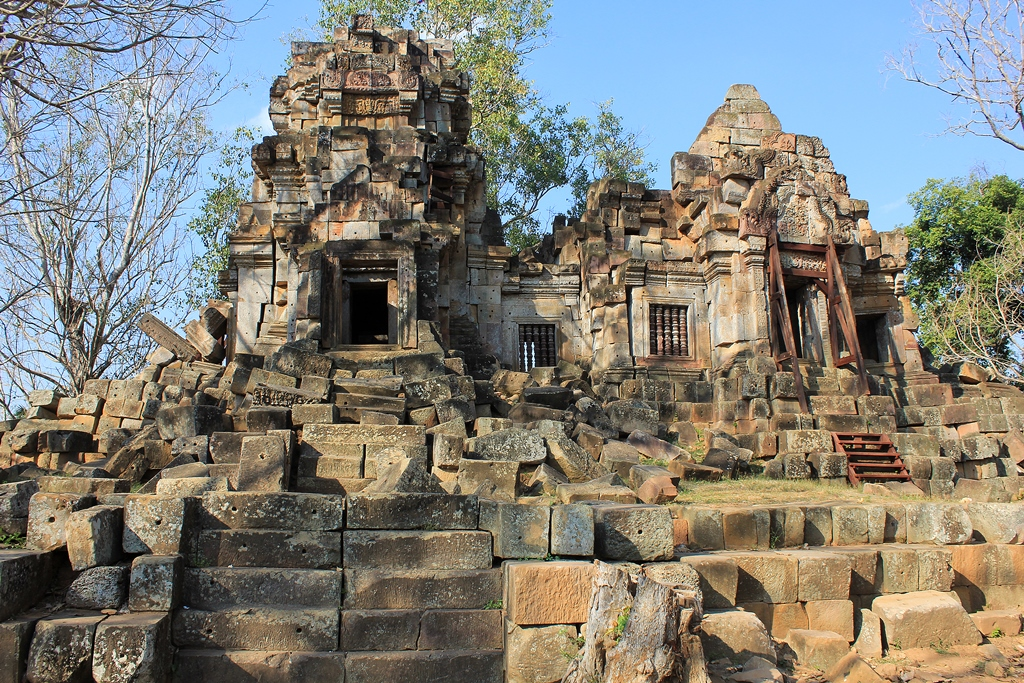
- Wat Ek Phnom

- Location in Cambodia

Religion
- Affiliation: Hinduism
- Province: Battambang

Location
- Country: Cambodia
- Interactive map of Wat Ek Phnom
- Coordinates: 13°09′46″N 103°11′18″E

Architecture
- Type: Khmer (Khleang and Baphuon styles)
- Creator: Suryavarman I
- Completed: 1027 A.D.

Wat Ek Phnom is an Angkorian temple located on the left side of the Sangkae River at the small creek of Prek Daun Taev northwest the Peam Aek spot approximately 9 km north of the city of Battambang in north western Cambodia. It is a Hindu temple built in the 11th century under the rule of King Suryavarman I. Although partly collapsed and looted it is famous for its well-carved lintels and pediments.

== The site ==
An enormous white-stone sitting Buddha statue leads to the modern Buddhist pagoda Ek Phnom surrounded by 18 Bodhi Trees. The site is deemed as a very popular picnic and pilgrimage destination for Khmers at celebration times. The pagoda opens the way to the ruins of the ancient hinduist temple. The ancient temple, built of sandstone blocks and enclosed by the remains of a laterite outer wall and a Baray, consists of small temples or prasats on a platform and measures 52m by 49m. Mostly reduced to ruins today only the main towers of the temple remain standing whose upper flanks hold some fine bas-reliefs.

== Bas-reliefs ==
The bas-reliefs depict events of Hindu mythology mostly referring to Krishna. In the same way as Krishna, Suryavarman I carried out institutional reforms of the state

== Images of Wat Ek Phnom ==
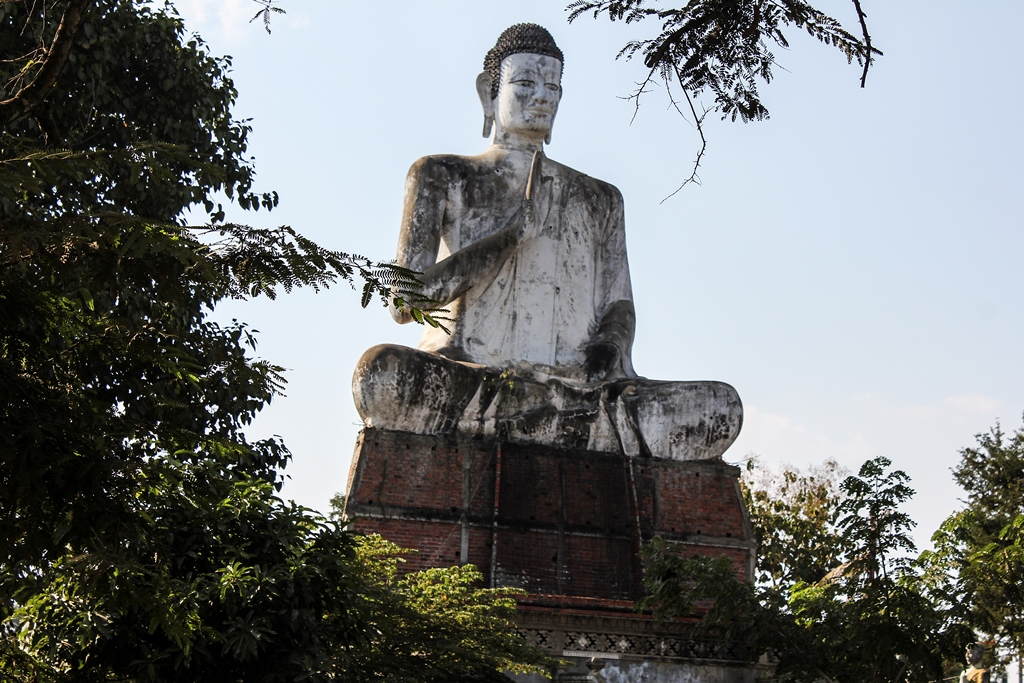
Buddha statue

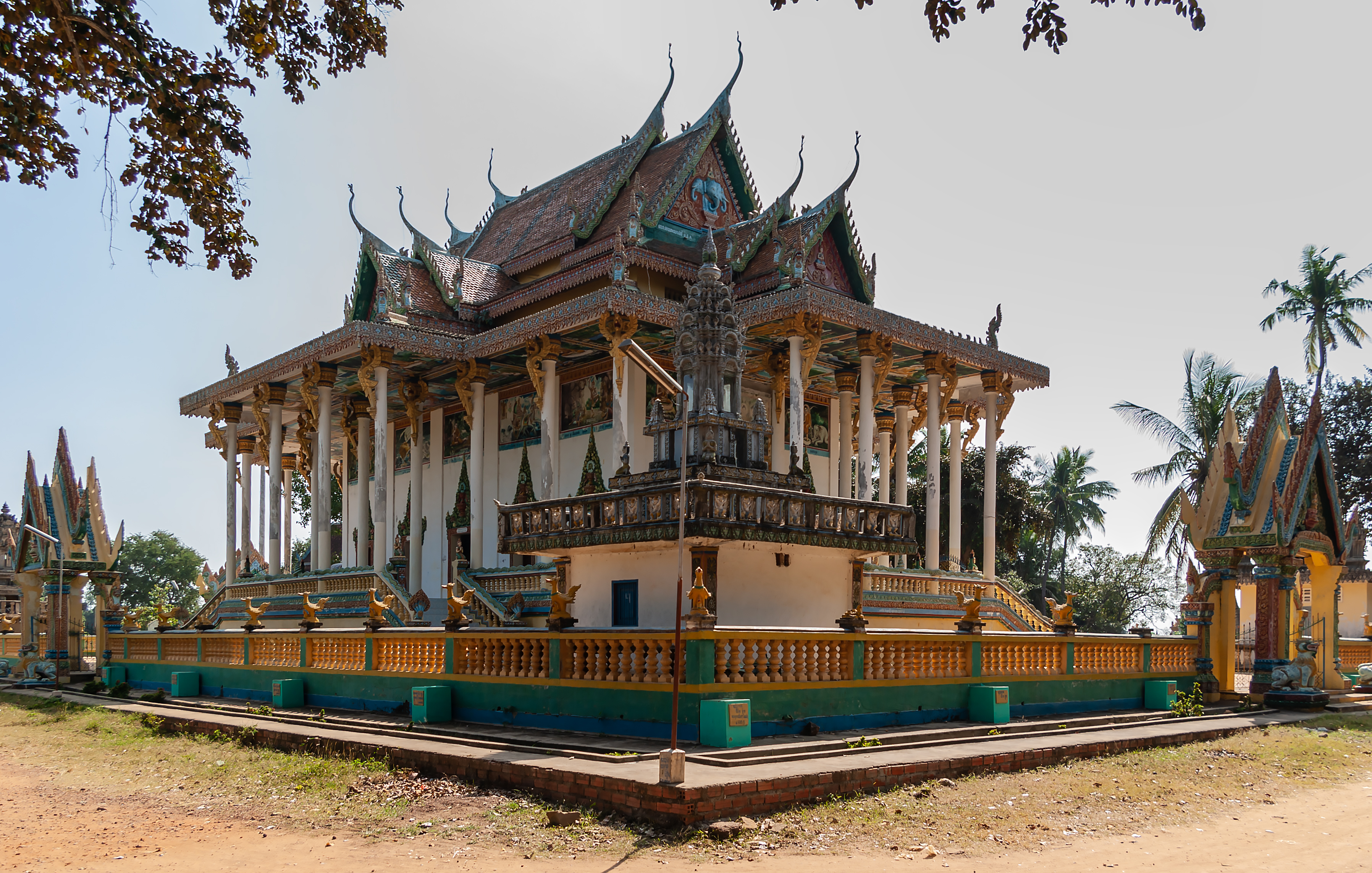
modern Wat Ek Phnom

== Images of the ancient Ek Phnom temple ==
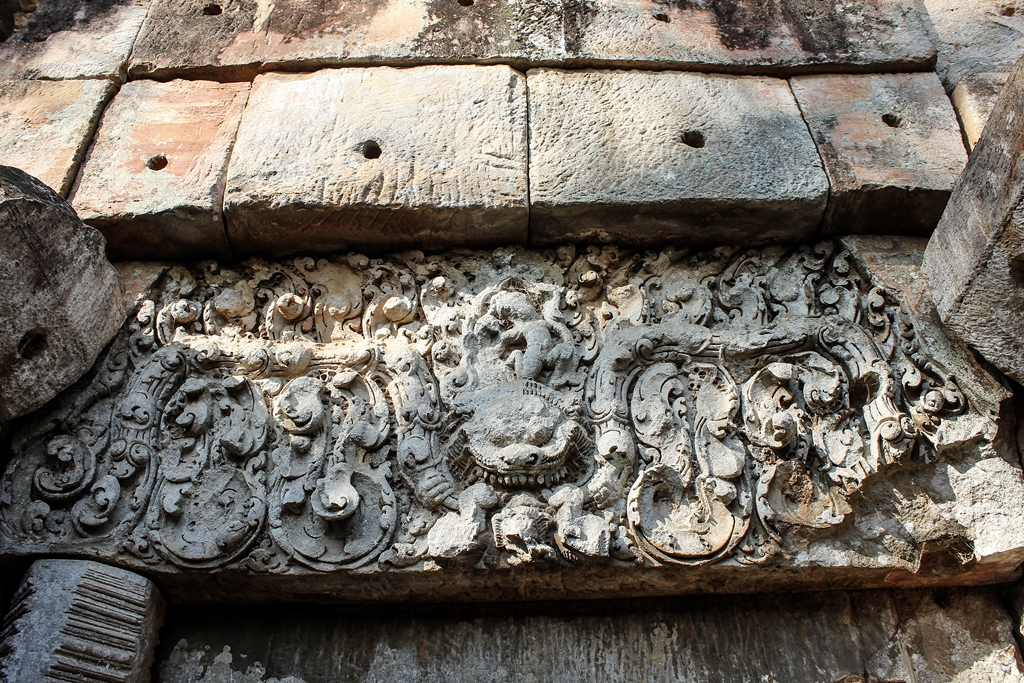
Lintel of the central tower: Krishna, lifting Govardhana hill and fighting the Kaliya snake, whilst standing on a kala

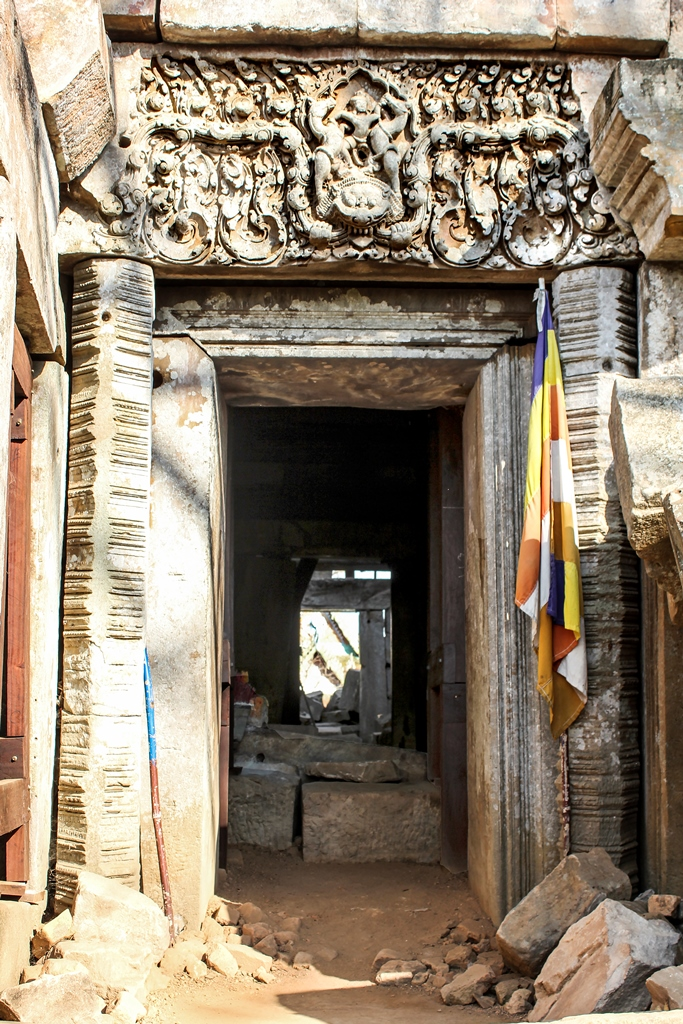
Lintel above the north door: Krishna taming horses whilst standing on kala

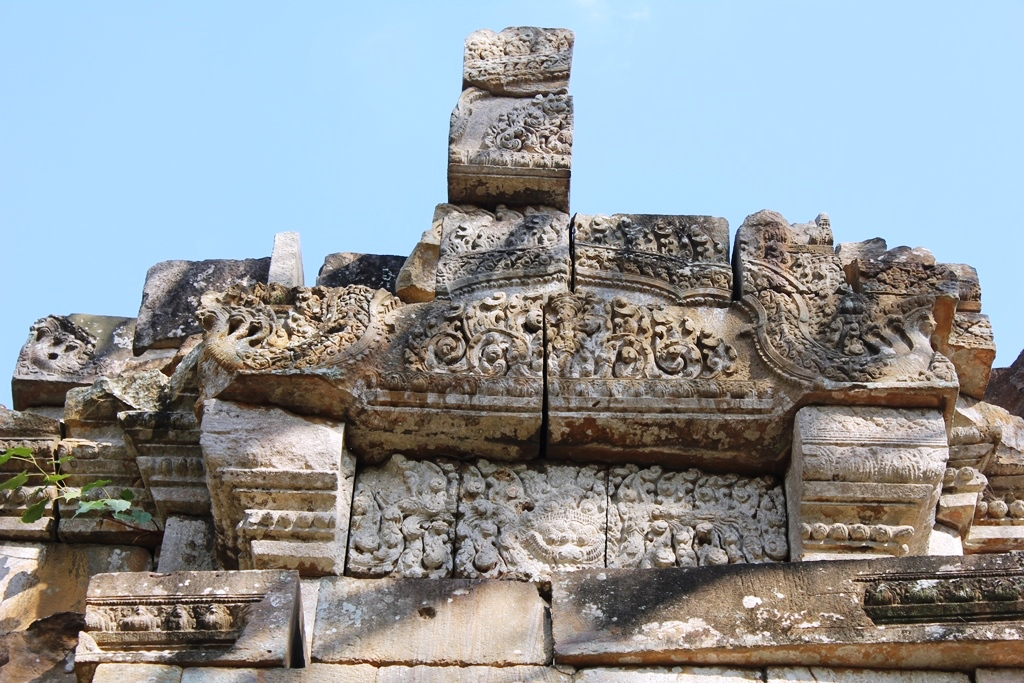
Lintel with pediment

== Bibliography ==
- Chandler, David. A History of Cambodia. Silkworm Books Thailand 4th edition 2008. ISBN 978-974-9511-57-2.
