= Killing caves of Phnom Sampeau =

Khmer Rouge execution site in Cambodia

Coordinates: 13°01′15″N 103°05′52″E

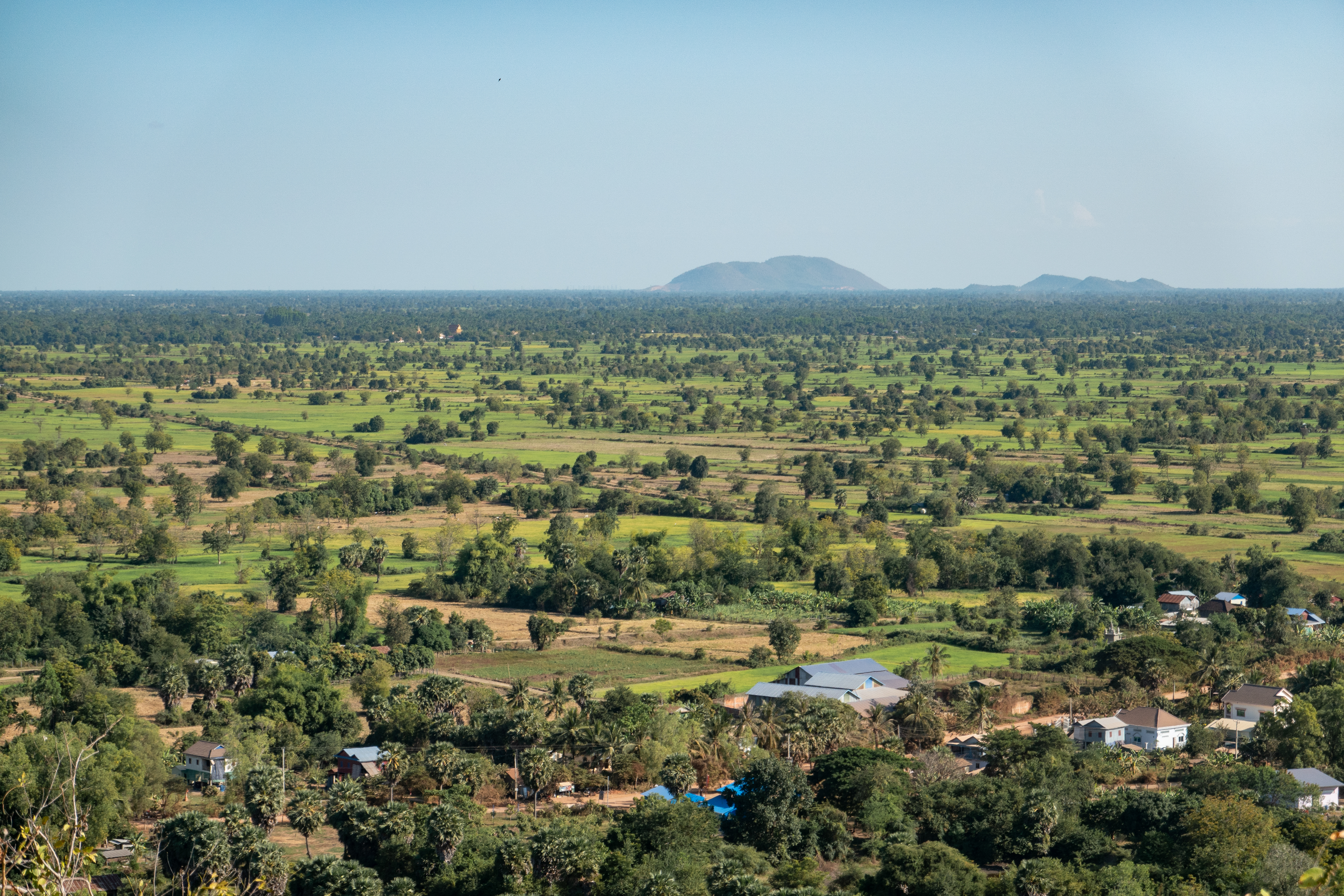
View of the valley below Phnom Sampeau mountain

The killing caves of Phnom Sampeau are a Khmer Rouge (KR) execution site on Phnom Sampeau, a hill 7 miles (11 km) southwest of Battambang in western Cambodia. KR killed their victims on top of the cave at the rim of a daylight shaft or ceiling hole and threw the corpses into the cave. Men and women were placed in separate caves and clothes in another. Phnom Sampeau (Sampeau Hill) has multiple caves that traditionally served as Buddhist temples. A large glass memorial in the cave next to the skulls and bones and a golden reclining Buddha mark the massacre. A memorial assembled from cyclone fencing and chicken wire contains human bones.

== Geography ==
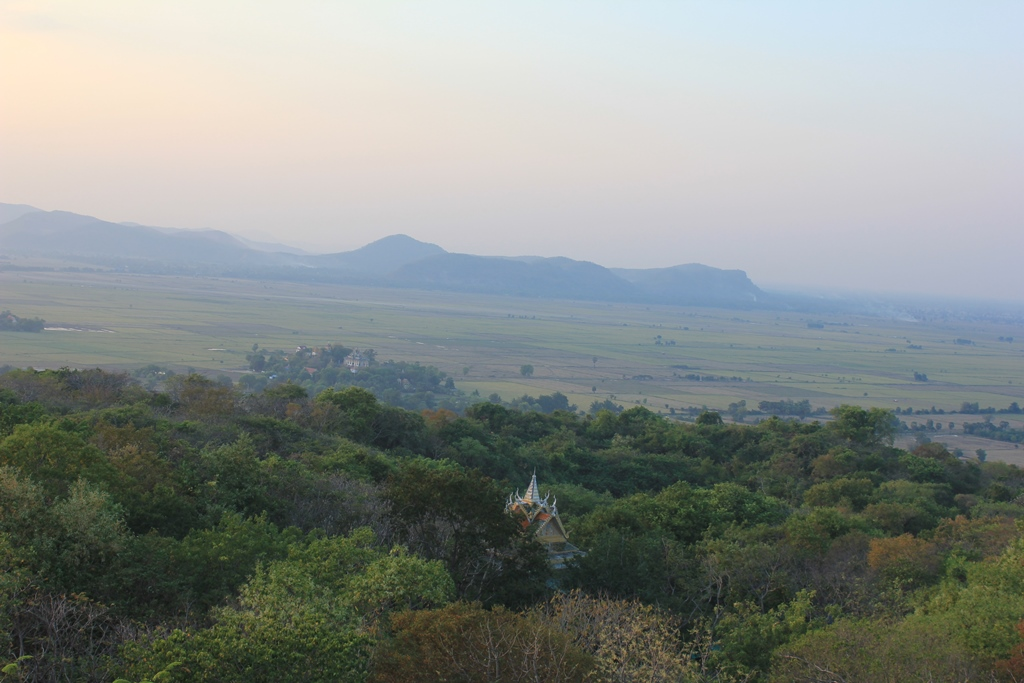
View from the top of Phnom Sampeau

The caves are located on the Mountain of Phnom Sampeau, about mid-way up the mountain along a 250 m (820 ft) road. The mountain is of karstic limestone and features a group of temples. The approach is 12 km (7.5 mi) to the west of Battambang city on the road to Pailin. The mountain is home for a group of macaques, which feed on bananas left by pilgrims. A natural arch made of stalactites offers views of the deep canyon. The valley has vegetation of vines and is inhabited by bats.

== Features ==
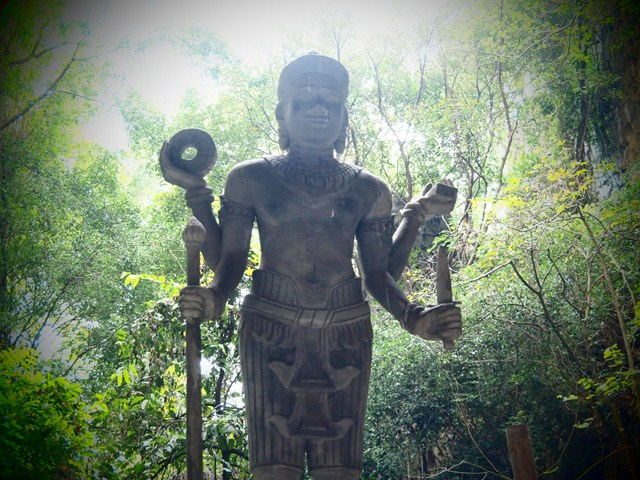
A statue found in one of the caves in the Phnom Sampeau mountain

A golden, reclining Buddha image appears in one cave. Skulls and bones are kept in a glass-covered cabinet next to the statue. Remnants of war artillery remain, oriented towards Phnom Krapau (Crocodile Mountain), the strategic KR location during the war. At the base point a chicken-wire memorial is present which houses other skeletons. Another feature seen is an incomplete Buddha carving, a 30-foot (9.1 m) image, carved partly into the rock face of the hill, with only the head of the Buddha exposed. Lack of funds prevented its completion.

== See also ==
- Bibliography of the Cambodian genocide
