= Bavel District =

Bavel ស្រុកបវេល
- District (srok)
- District location in Battambang Province
- Coordinates: 13°14′9.64″N 102°49′44.76″E
- Country: Cambodia
- Province: Battambang
- Communes: 6

Population (1998)
  - Total: 79,035
- Time zone: +7

Bavel District (Khmer: ស្រុកបវេល) is a district (srok) of Battambang Province, in north-western Cambodia.

== Administration ==
The district is subdivided into 6 communes (khum).

=== Communes and villages ===
Khum (Commune)	Phum (Villages)
Bavel	Bavel Muoy, Bavel Pir, Tumnob Tuek, Dach Proat, Sangkae Vear, Peam, Kampong Pnov, Stueng Dach, Spean Kandoal, Sang Reang, Svay Chrum, Doun Avav, Prey Totueng Muoy, Prey Totueng Pir, Kouk, Sla Khlanh, Kampong Chhnang Muoy, Kampong Chhnang Pir, Samaki
Khnach Romeas	Prey Sangha, Kaoh Ream, Rung Ampil, Ballang Leu, Svay Sa, Khnach Romeas, Ballang Mean Chey, Chroy Sna
Lvea	Lvea, Doun Nhaem, Chamkar, Dangkao, Ream Sena, Doun Aok, Ping Pong, Svay Prey, Boeng Samraong, Kbal Spean, Lvea Chas, Ta Ny
Prey Khpos	Ta Hi, Pou, Ta Mat, Meakkloea, Prey Khpos, Sranal, Dangkao Pen, Kbal Thnal, Boeng Chra Nieng
Ampil Pram Daeum	Dangkao Kramang, Siem, Ampil, Sthapor, Ta Khiev, Buo Run, Doung, Sthab Por Pi
Kdol Tahen	Suon Sla, Kdol Kraom, San, Peam, Kandal, Buor, Thmei, Tuol Krasang, Kdol Leu, Ta Haen, Dom Nak Domkoa, Trapeang Kbal Sva, Boeng Anlok, Brab Hoeb, Sras Toeuk, Anlong Rey, Ta Toat, Ou Doan Poa, Khleang, Chrang Bak, Anlong Riang, Boeung Sanke, Tomnob Takoun, Toul Snal, Prey Thom, Kampong Makak, Bou Sangreach
