= Battambang province =

Province of Cambodia

Coordinates: 13°1′43″N 102°59′22″E

Battambang Province ខេត្តបាត់ដំបង
- Province

Khmer transcription(s)
  - Khmer: ខេត្តបាត់ដំបង
  - UNGEGN: Khaet Băt Dǎmbâng
  - ALA-LC: Khett Pât Ṭaṃpang
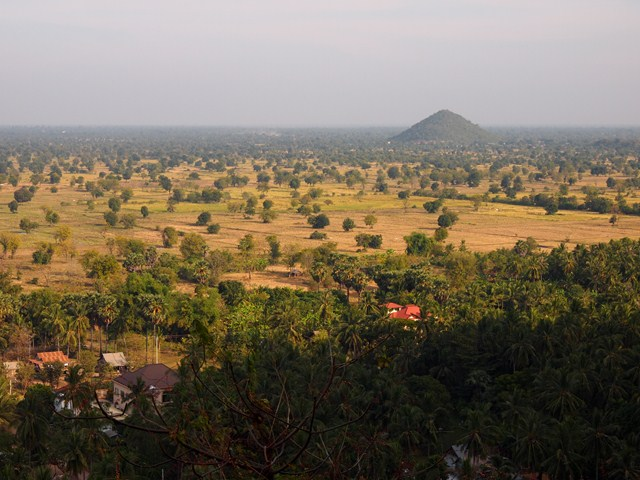
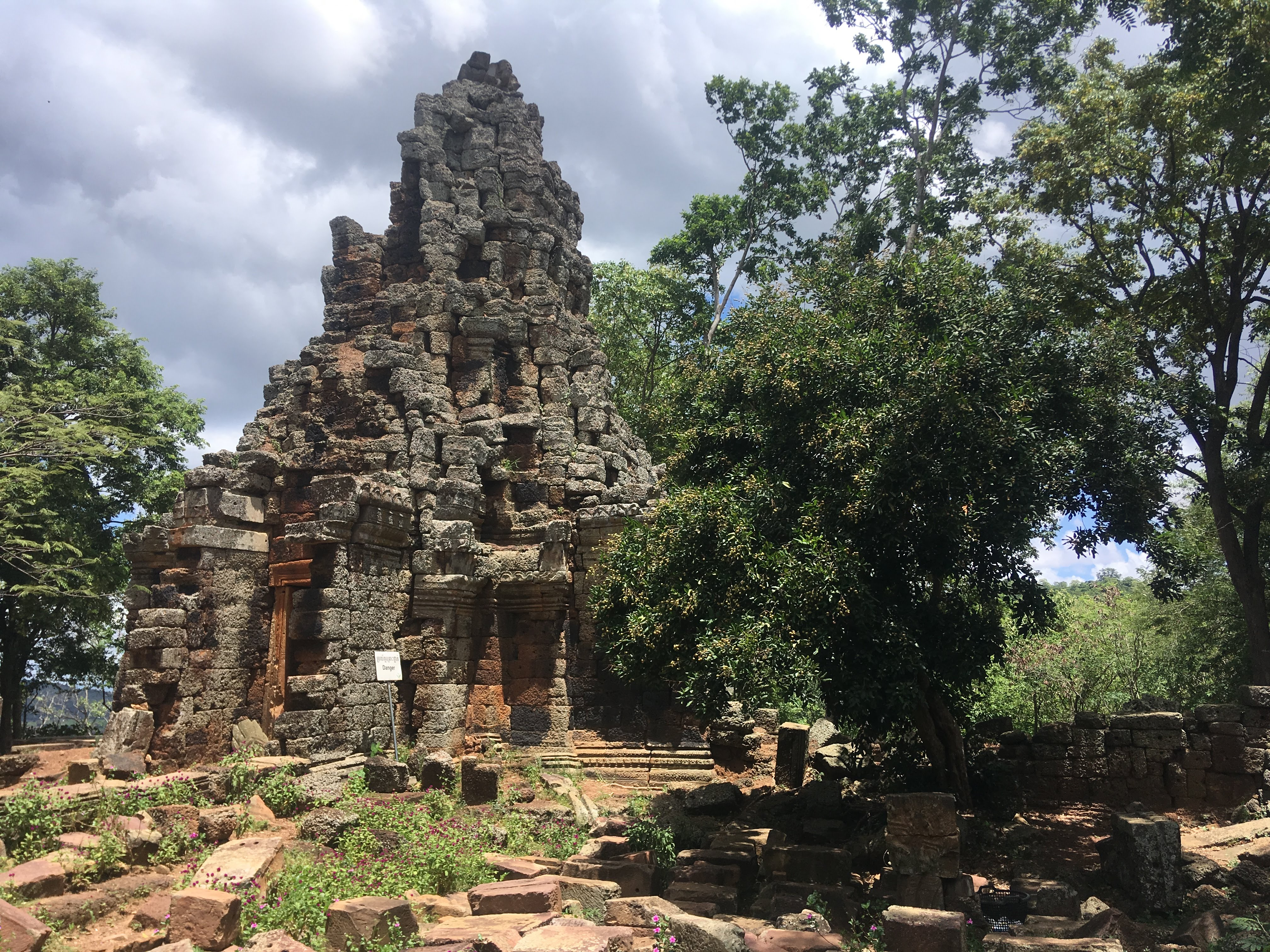
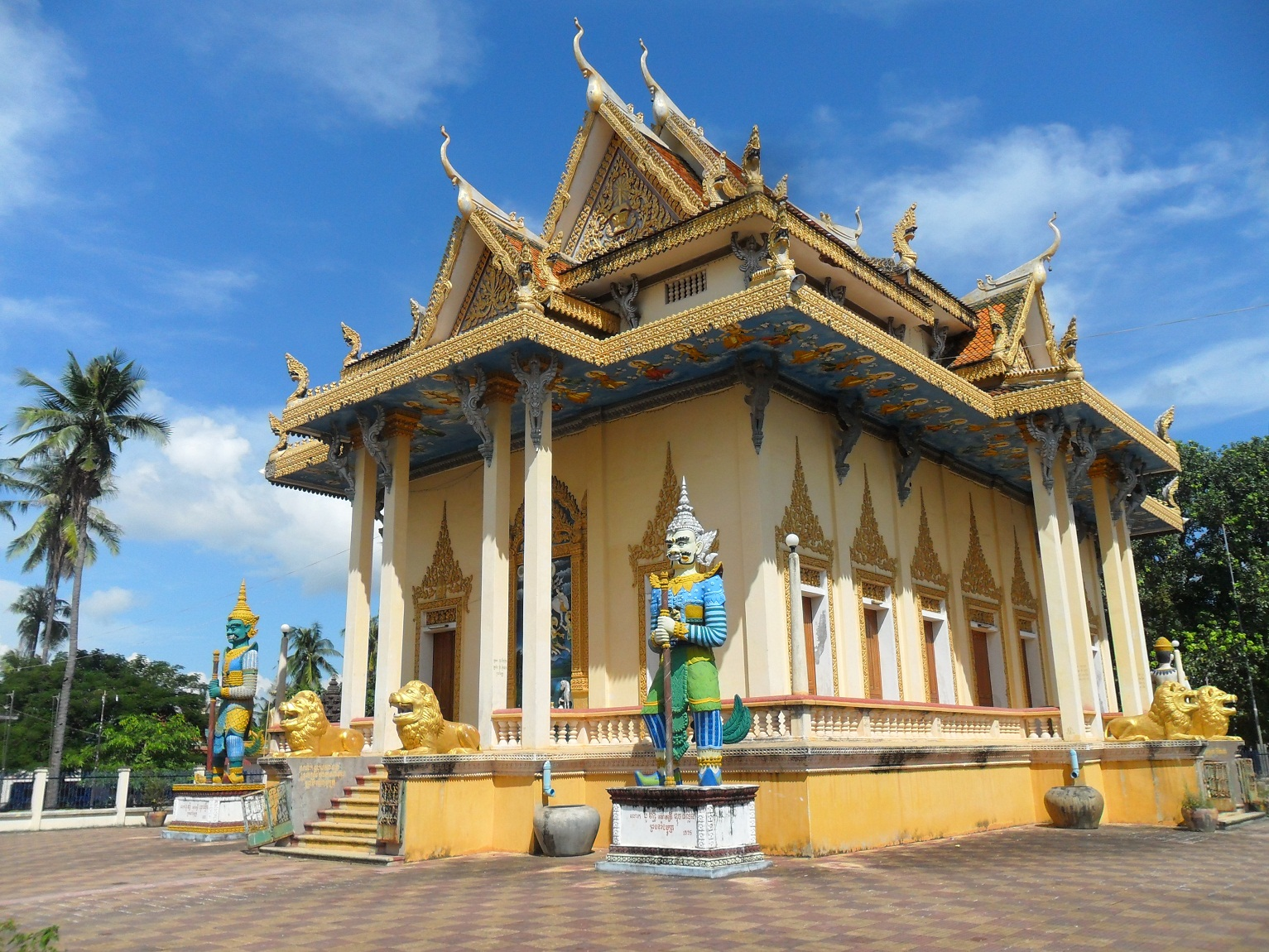
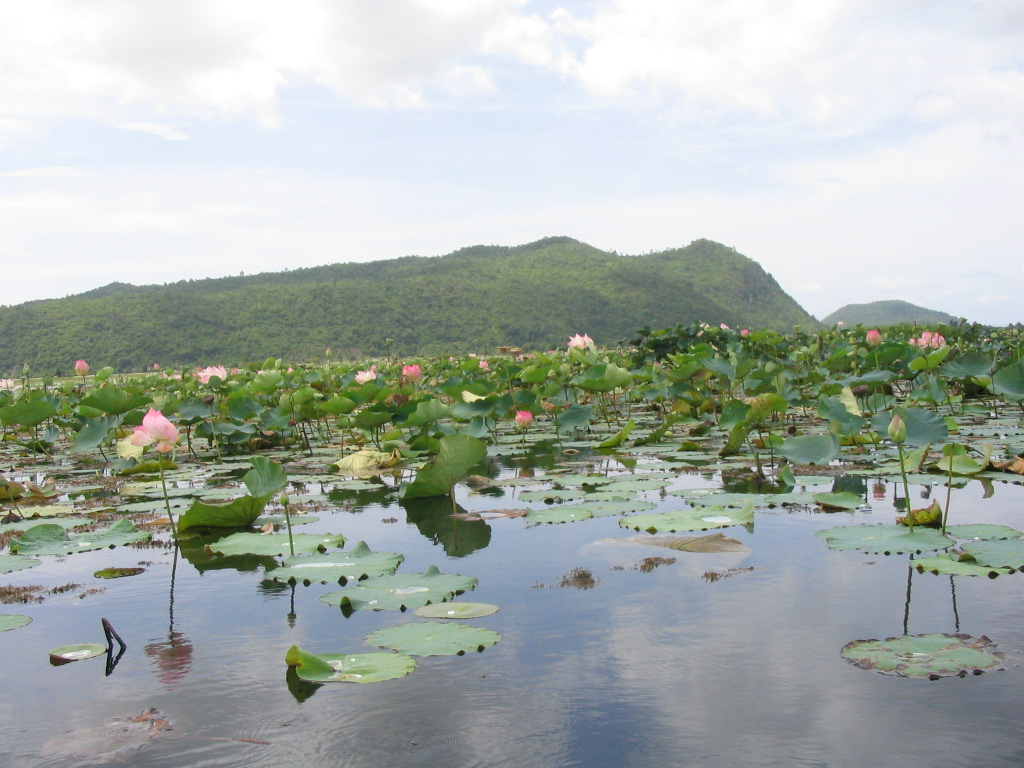
- From top: Phnom Sampov, Wat Banan, Wat Sangkae, Kamping Puoy Lake

- Seal

- Map of Cambodia highlighting Battambang province
- Country: Cambodia
- Provincial status: 6 December 1907
- Capital: Battambang
- Subdivisions: 1 municipality; 13 districts

Government
  - Governor: Sok Lu (CPP)
  - National Assembly: 8 / 125

Area
  - Total: 11,702 km^{2} (4,518 sq mi)
  - Rank: 5th

Population (2024)
  - Total: ▲1,132,017
  - Rank: 4th
  - Density: 93/km^{2} (240/sq mi)
  - Rank: 16th
- Time zone: UTC+07:00 (ICT)
- ISO 3166 code: KH-2
- Website: www.battambang.gov.kh

Battambang Province (Khmer: ខេត្តបាត់ដំបង, Khaet Băt Dǎmbâng, [ɓat ɗɑm.ɓɑːŋ]; lit. 'lost staff') is a province of Cambodia in the far northwest of the country. Bordering provinces are Banteay Meanchey to the north, Pursat to the east and south, Siem Reap to the northeast, and Pailin to the west. The northern and southern extremes of the province's western boundaries form part of the international border with Thailand. In addition, Tonlé Sap forms part of the northeastern boundary between Siem Reap and Pursat. Its capital and largest city is Battambang.

It is the fifth most populous province in Cambodia. In land area, Battambang is the fifth largest province of Cambodia. Battambang is one of the provinces included in the Tonle Sap Biosphere Reserve. The province's fertile rice fields have led to a mostly agricultural economy giving rise to the moniker "the rice bowl of Cambodia". The province features a range of cultures as well as natural resources. Seventy five percent of the area is jungles and mountains. The area has a tropical climate.

== Etymology ==
The compound word, Battambang, in the title Battambang Province, is composed of the Khmer words băt (បាត់, 'lost') and dǎmbâng (ដំបង, 'stick'), which literally mean 'lost stick' in reference to the local legend of Lok Ta Dambang Kranhung (លោកតាដំបងក្រញូង, Lok Ta Dǎmbâng Krânhung). During the annexation of Battambang Province to Siam, it was named Phra Tabong Province.

== History ==
=== Legend of Lok Ta Dambang Kranhung ===
The origin story of Battambang, by many locals, is remembered by the mythological story of Lok Ta Dambang Kranhung, or known as Ta Dambang for short. According to the legend, the area used to be a small kingdom ruled by a tyrant king. The locals, having been mistreated under his reign, prayed for salvation to spirits. One day, a young man went to tend his cows when he found a staff made of kranhung, rosewood, in the river.

He discovered the staff was an immense source of power, so he challenged the tyrant king’s rule and came out victorious. After becoming the new ruler of the kingdom, he understood that it would make him a target to his adversaries. One night while he was sleeping, he dreamt of a prince on a white horse that’d come to challenge and defeat his rule. Out of fear that this would happen, he ordered the former prince, who was bedridden and sick, to be left abandoned in the forest. While in the forest, a white horse sent by the spirits, imbued with the power of healing, cured the dying prince.

Some time had passed, and the young man ruled fearlessly, hammering down on dissent and ruthlessly expanding the kingdom. The civilians of the kingdom were reminded of their former tyrannical king, so they once again prayed to the spirits. One day, the young man’s omen came true, he saw the prince on a flying white horse. Remembering his fate in the dream, the young man threw the staff at them in hopes it would prevent his demise. The spirits, angry with the young man’s culminating actions, stopped the staff from hitting the horse and the prince.

The legend ends with the prince claiming the throne and the staff being lost forever. The young man became a neak ta, meaning guardian spirit, known as Lok Ta Dambang Kranhung. The legend of Ta Dambang mirrors such European stories like King Arthur, Excalibur, and Lady of the Lake. Historian David Chandler believes that Cambodian origin stories, such as this one, are not meant to be fact, but convey actual events with mythological settings, making it easier for history to be passed down through the traditional method of oral storytelling which Khmer people have relied on in the past.

=== Paleolithic period to Angkorian period ===
Evidence of human presence in Battambang dates back to the Middle Paleolithic period, over 70,000 years ago, from archaeologist excavations at the cave site Laang Spean. Many centuries later, prior to the Khmer Empire, the region consisted of smaller ethnically diverse kingdoms. Many locals believe this is when the actual events the legend of Ta Dambang is based on occurred. The kingdoms resisted unity until Jayavarman II, after he declared independence from Java, united Chenla. It is believed that during the reign of Jayavarman VII, the urban center of what is now Battambang Province’s capital, was established based on an existing trade hub.

There are many remains of ancient temples in Battambang from the Khmer Empire period. One of the most notable being the historical pilgrimage site Wat Banan which was built during the 11th century under the rule of Udayadityavarman II and completed in the 12th century under the rule of Suryavarman II, the builder of Angkor Wat. Another famous one is Wat Ek Phnom which was built earlier under Suryavarman I and dedicated to the Hindu deity Krishna.

=== Middle period ===
After the Fall of Angkor, Battambang is believed to have remained a central trading hub in Cambodia for rice and other goods. During this era, Cambodia had been subject to dispute between neighboring Thailand and Vietnam, and Battambang became a center of negotiation. Then in 1795, Battambang was annexed to Siam by Ang Em for support against neighboring Vietnam and became a part of Monthon Burapha, also known as Inner Cambodia, which was a type of mandala state. The Siamese renamed Battambang to Phra Tabong and attempted to assimilate the local Khmer people.

However, they were met with heavy resistance, so they employed a young Khmer royal from Takéo Province, Paen Aphaivong បែន អភ័យវង្ស, also known as Chaophraya Aphaiphubet, to rule as a governor of Battambang. This prompted a lineage of rule under the Aphaivong family in Battambang. The locals of Battambang recall their rule with mixed emotion. They are remembered as exploitative but also celebrated for minimizing Siamese influence. The local Khmer people minted their own currency instead of using the Thai baht, as a form of resistance against assimilation.

=== Protectorate period to independence era ===
In 1863, Cambodia became a protectorate under French Indochina and slowly began regaining territory. In 1906, King Sisowath traveled to Paris to convince the French to return Montha Burapha back to Cambodia, which had been separated from the country for over a century. His plea was, “Give me back my Alsace-Lorraine!”, an analogy that he thought the French would understand and sympathize with. In 1907, an agreement was made between the French and Siamese to transfer Battambang and the rest of Monthon Burapha back to Cambodia.

The locals of Battambang recall the French rule as being destructive, and that they at least appreciated open trade with Bangkok and the educational development they received under Siamese rule. Chhum Aphaivong, the former ruler of Battambang, had his power diminished by the French which ultimately ended the Aphaivong family’s rule in Battambang. The Aphaivongs would become important figures in Thai royalty and politics, such as Khuang Aphaiwong who was the prime minister of Thailand in the 1940s.

Under French rule, Battambang Province became the country’s most prosperous, as it was the main source of rice exports. However, once again the region fell under Thai control in 1941 when the Japanese, who occupied Cambodia at that time, annexed the region to Thailand. A Singaporean native, named Geoffrey Tan, recalls his time in Battambang during that era when he was sent there to help build infrastructure for the Japanese. The Japanese had used Battambang as a training ground for their battles in the Pacific. It was not until Prime Minister Khuang Aphaiwong of Thailand signed an agreement in Washington D.C. on November 16th, 1946, returning the region to Cambodia under French rule.

After a period of struggle, in 1953 Cambodia gained independence from France. Under Norodom Sihanouk, the region’s prosperity continued, specifically becoming an important source for Cambodian culture. Famous singers like Ros Serey Sothea, Huoy Meas, and Pen Ran were all from there, and Sinn Sisamouth had spent some of his childhood there and wrote many songs about the province, like Champa Battambang, which had made it a popular reference in Cambodian pop culture. By the late 1960s, the prosperity of Battambang Province, and Cambodia in general, began to decline due to the intensification of the Vietnam War. In particular, the district of Samlot had become a hotspot of uprising from 1967-1968, ultimately being considered the events that began the Cambodian Civil War. Nonetheless, the rest of Battambang Province was considered as a safe haven of Cambodia, even as the Khmer Rouge takeover neared. The province did not fall singlehandedly under the Khmer Rouge, but the general fall of the province to Khmer Rouge authority occurred a few days after the Fall of Phnom Penh.

=== Khmer Rouge era and aftermath ===
During the Khmer Rouge, provincial status was abolished and Battambang was integrated into one of the six zones, the Northwest Zone. The region of Battambang became a place of cruel atrocities during the Cambodian genocide, specifically the Killing Caves of Phnom Sampoeu which has transitioned into an important memorial site. The Khmer Rouge had damaged a lot of Battambang’s infrastructure, many pagodas and houses were either destroyed, looted, or reoccupied for another purpose. Following the liberation of Cambodia in 1979, the Khmer Rouge retreated to Pailin which was then a part of the western portion of Battambang Province. The province continued to face terrorism and harassment from the Khmer Rouge until 1998.

During the 2000s, Battambang began recovering and stabilizing from the Khmer Rouge, but trauma from the Khmer Rouge and its effects remain. By the 2010s, Battambang Province became popular for tourism due to the previously mentioned Killing Caves memorial, the bamboo train or nori ណូរី, and the colonial architecture of Battambang city. As of recently, the Cambodian government has made efforts to develop the province’s infrastructure which lagged behind Phnom Penh and other hotspots of development during the recovery era. Some of these efforts include developing the existing railroads and reopening the Vielbaekchan Airport.

== Governors ==
=== Annexed to Siam (1795–1907) ===
Governors of Battambang Province
No.	Name	Period	Notes
1	Chaophraya Aphaiphubet (Paen) ចៅពញាអភ័យធីបេស បែន	1794–1810	Originator of the House of Abhaiwongse
2	Phraya Aphaiphubet (Paen) ពញាអភ័យធីបេស ប៉ែន	1810–1814	
3	Phraya Aphaiphubet (Ruoh) ពញាអភ័យធីបេស រស់	1814–1827	
4	Phraya Aphaiphubet (Chet)	1827–1835	
5	Neak Ang Em អង្គឥម	1835–1839	
-	Phra Phithakbodin (Som)	1847–1848	Acting governor
6	Phraya Aphaiphubet (Nong) ពញាអភ័យធីបេស នង	1848–1860	
7	Chaophraya Kathathonthoranin (Yia Abhaiwongse) ចៅពញាគធាធរធរនិន្ទ្រ យារ (ញ៉ុញ)	1860–1892	
8	Chaophraya Aphaiphubet (Chum Abhaiwongse) ចៅពញាអភ័យភូបេស ឈុំ	1892–1907	Elevated to the governor of Monthon Burapha (1903–1907)

Governors of Monthon Burapha
No.	Name	Period	Notes
1	Phraya Maha Ammatyathibodi (Run Sripen)	1891–1893	
2	Phraya Sakdaphidetworarit (Dan Amaranonda)	1893–1903	
3	Chaophraya Aphaiphubet (Chum Abhaiwongse)	1903–1907	Also the governor of Battambang Province

=== Returned to Cambodia by France (1907–1941) ===
Governors of Battambang Province
No.	Name	Period	Notes
1	Aem Arun (អែម អរុណ)	1907–1922	
2	Chie (ជា)	1922–1927	
3	Noun (នួន)	1927–1934	
4	Chong Tuon (ចុង ទួន)	1934–1939	
5	Mieh Nal (មាស ណាល់)	1939–1941	

=== Reannexed to Siam during Japanese Occupation (1941–1946) ===
Governors of Phra Tabong Province
No.	Name	Period	Notes
1	Wek Suwannakon (Col. Luang Ranpatiwet)	1941	
2	Mom Dvivongs Thavalyasakdi (M.R. Chalermlap Dvivongs)	19 Nov. 1941-1943	Later became the chief advisor to the governor of Si Rat Malai
3	?	1943-1946	

=== Returned to Cambodia and independence from France (1946–1975) ===
Governors of Battambang Province
No.	Name	Period	Notes
1	Lon Nol (លន់ នល់)	1946–1947	1st term
2	Sin Chhoy (ស៊ីន ឆយ)	1947–1948	
-	Lon Nol (លន់ នល់)	1948–1949	2nd term
3	Tep Phan (ទេព ផន)	1949–1951	1st term
4	Pho Prueong (ផូ ព្រឿង)	1951–1954	
5	Chay Thol (ចាយ ធុល)	1954–1956	
-	Tep Phan (ទេព ផន)	1956–1959	2nd term
6	Tuem Ngoun (ទឹម ងួន)	1959–1966	1st term
7	Yaem Muniroat (យ៉ែម មុនីរ័ត្ន)	1966–1967	
8	In Tam (អ៊ិន តាំ)	1967–1968	
-	Tuem Ngoun (ទឹម ងួន)	April–October 1968	2nd term
9	Sek Sam Iet (សេក សំអៀត)	1968–1974	1st term
10	Sa Hao (សារ ហោ)	1974–January 1975	
-	Sek Sam Iet (សេក សំអៀត)	January–April 1975	2nd term

=== Abolished by the Khmer Rouge (1975-1979) ===
Secretaries of the Northwest Zone
No.	Name	Period	Notes
1	Ruoh Nhuem (រស់ ញឹម)	1975–1978	
2	Ta Mok (តា ម៉ុក)	1978–1979	

=== Reestablished during the People’s Republic of Kampuchea (1979–1993) ===
Governors of Battambang Province
No.	Name	Period	Notes
1	Kaew Thi (កែវ ធី)	1979–1980	
2	Lay Samon (ឡាយ សាម៉ុន)	1980–1982	
3	Sum Sat (ស៊ុំ សាត)	1982–1984	
4	Kae Kuem Yan (កែ គឹមយ៉ាន)	1984–1986	
5	Sok Saran (សុក សារ៉ាន់)	1986–1991	

=== Kingdom of Cambodia (1993–present) ===
Governors of Battambang Province
No.	Name	Period	Notes
1	Ung Sami (អ៊ុង សាមី)	1991–1999	
2	Noeu Sam (នៅ សំ)	1999–2001	
3	Prach Chan (ប្រាជ្ញ ចន្ទ)	2001–2014	
4	Chan Sophal (ច័ន្ទ សុផល)	2014–2017	
5	Ngoun Roatana (ងួន រតនៈ)	2017–2021	
6	Sok Lu (សុខ លូ)	2021–incumbent	

== Administrative divisions ==
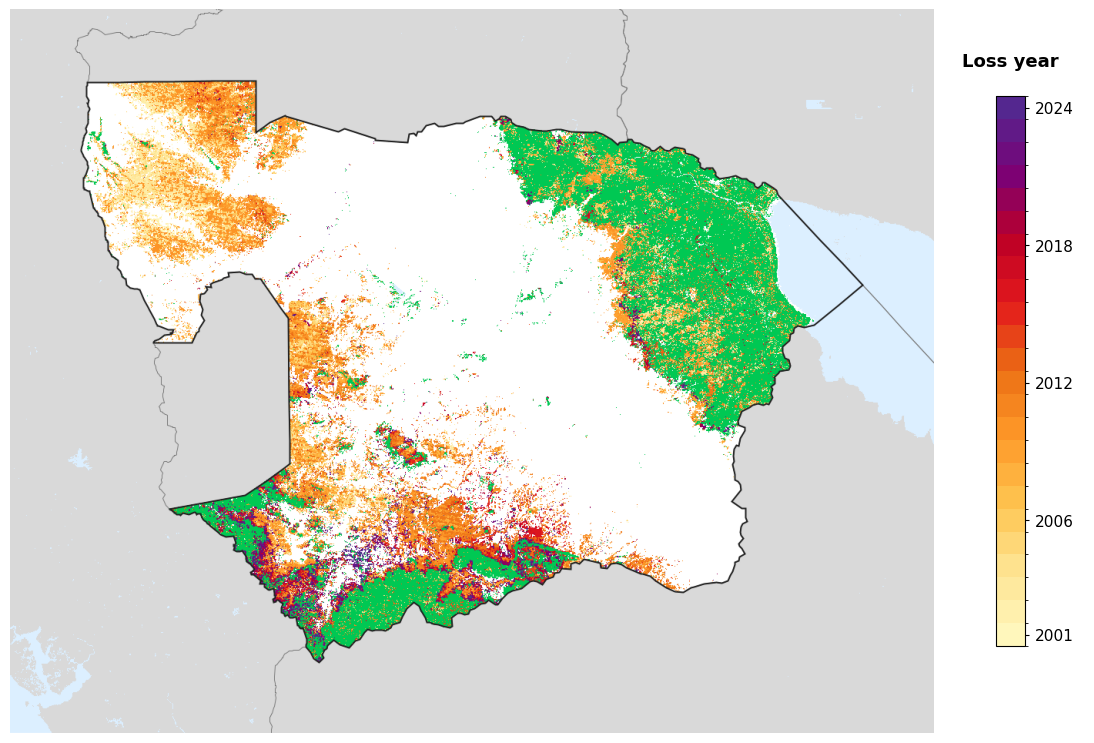
Tree-cover loss year in Battambang, 2001-2024, from the Global Forest Change dataset.

Battambang Province is divided into 13 districts and one municipality which are further subdivided into 93 communes (Khmer: ឃុំ, khŭm), 10 quarters (Khmer: សង្កាត់, sǎngkăt) and 810 villages (Khmer: ភូមិ, phum).

ISO code	Name	Khmer	Population (2019)	Subdivisions
— Municipality —
02-03	Battambang	បាត់ដំបង	119,251	10 sangkat
— District —
02-01	Banan	បាណន់	86,486	8 khum
02-02	Thma Koul	ថ្មគោល	105,982	10 khum
02-04	Bavel	បវេល	92,306	9 khum
02-05	Aek Phnom	ឯកភ្នំ	71,120	7 khum
02-06	Moung Ruessei	មោងឫស្សី	103,841	9 khum
02-07	Rotanak Mondol	រតនមណ្ឌល	38,848	5 khum
02-08	Sangkae	សង្កែ	111,118	10 khum
02-09	Samlout	សំឡូត	43,715	7 khum
02-10	Sampov Loun	សំពៅលូន	37,323	6 khum
02-11	Phnum Proek	ភ្នំព្រឹក	44,741	5 khum
02-12	Kamrieng	កំរៀង	53,076	6 khum
02-13	Koas Krala	គាស់ក្រឡ	30,192	6 khum
02-14	Rukhak Kiri	រុក្ខគិរី	42,329	5 khum

Local government entities within the province include the two towns and 12 subdistrict municipalities.

== Religion ==
Religion in Battambang (2019 census)
1. Buddhism (98.3%)
2. Islam (1.40%)
3. Christianity (0.30%)
4. Animism and Other religions (0.00%)

The state religion is Theravada Buddhism. More than 98.3% of the people in Battambang practice Buddhism. Chams have been practicing Islam for hundreds of years. A small percentage practice Christianity.

== Historical sites ==
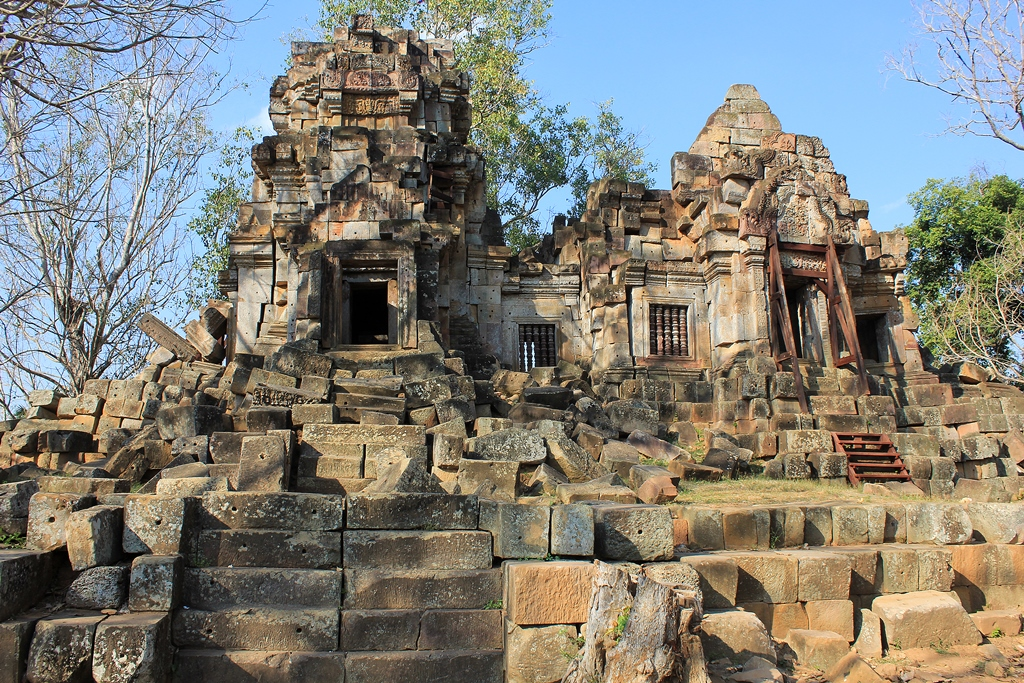
Wat Ek Phnom

=== Wat Ek Phnom ===
Wat Ek Phnom (Khmer: វត្តឯកភ្នំ, Voăt Aêk Phnom) is a partly collapsed 11th-century temple 11 km north of Battambang city. The temple measures 52 m by 49 m and is surrounded by the remains of a laterite wall and an ancient baray (reservoir). A lintel depicting the Churning of the Ocean of Milk is above the east entrance to the central temple, the upper flanks of which hold some finely carved bas-reliefs. Construction of an oversized Buddha statue began by locals next to the temple has been stopped by the government because, they say, it mars the site's historical provenance and "timeless beauty".

=== Wat Banan ===
Wat Banan (Khmer: វត្តបាណន់, Voăt Banǎn), some 25 km south of Battambang city, has been likened to a smaller version of the more imposing Angkor Wat. The 11th century Angkorian mountain ruin of Phnom Banan is one of the best preserved Angkorian Khmer temples around Battambang province.

=== Wat Samraong Knong ===
Wat Samraong Knong (វត្តសំរោងក្នុង, Voăt Sâmraông Knŏng) is an 18th-century pagoda with a rich history and a tragic well of shadows with an ossuary that holds the remains of some victims who died in the surrounding killing fields during the Cambodian genocide.

== Transportation ==
Battambang is accessible by road, and by boat via the Sangkae River. National Highway 5 runs straight through the province. Both the airport and railway line are not in use. Buses make 5-6 hour journey from Phnom Penh and the 3-4 hour journey from Siem Reap almost hourly.

== Notable people ==
- Ieu Koeus - Prime Minister of Cambodia
- Khuang Aphaiwong - Prime Minister of Thailand
- Vann Nath - a Cambodian painter, artist, writer, and human rights activist.
- Chath Piersath - Artist.
- Pen Ran - Musician.
- Huoy Meas - Musician.
- Keo Rumchong - Cambodian Kun Khmer kickboxer
- Ros Serey Sothea - Musician.
- Chhut Serey Vannthong - Cambodian Kun Khmer kickboxer
