= Svay Don Kêv =

Svay Don Kev
- Town
- Location on Cambodia
- Coordinates: 12°40′N 103°38′E
- Country: Cambodia
- Province: Battambang Province
- District: Moung Ruessei District

Svay Don Kêv is a small town in Moung Ruessei District in Battambang Province, central-western Cambodia. It is connected by river to the Tonle Sap lake in the north. The town is connected to Moung Ruessei several kilometres to the west via the National Highway 5 and railway tracks once connected it to Thnal Bat in the commune of Ruessei Krang.
