= Chrey =

Chrey may refer to several places in Cambodia:

== Battambang Province ==
- Chrey, Moung Ruessei
- Chrey, Thma Koul

== Prey Veng Province ==
- Chrey, Prey Veng
