= Claire Ly =

Survivor of the Cambodian genocide

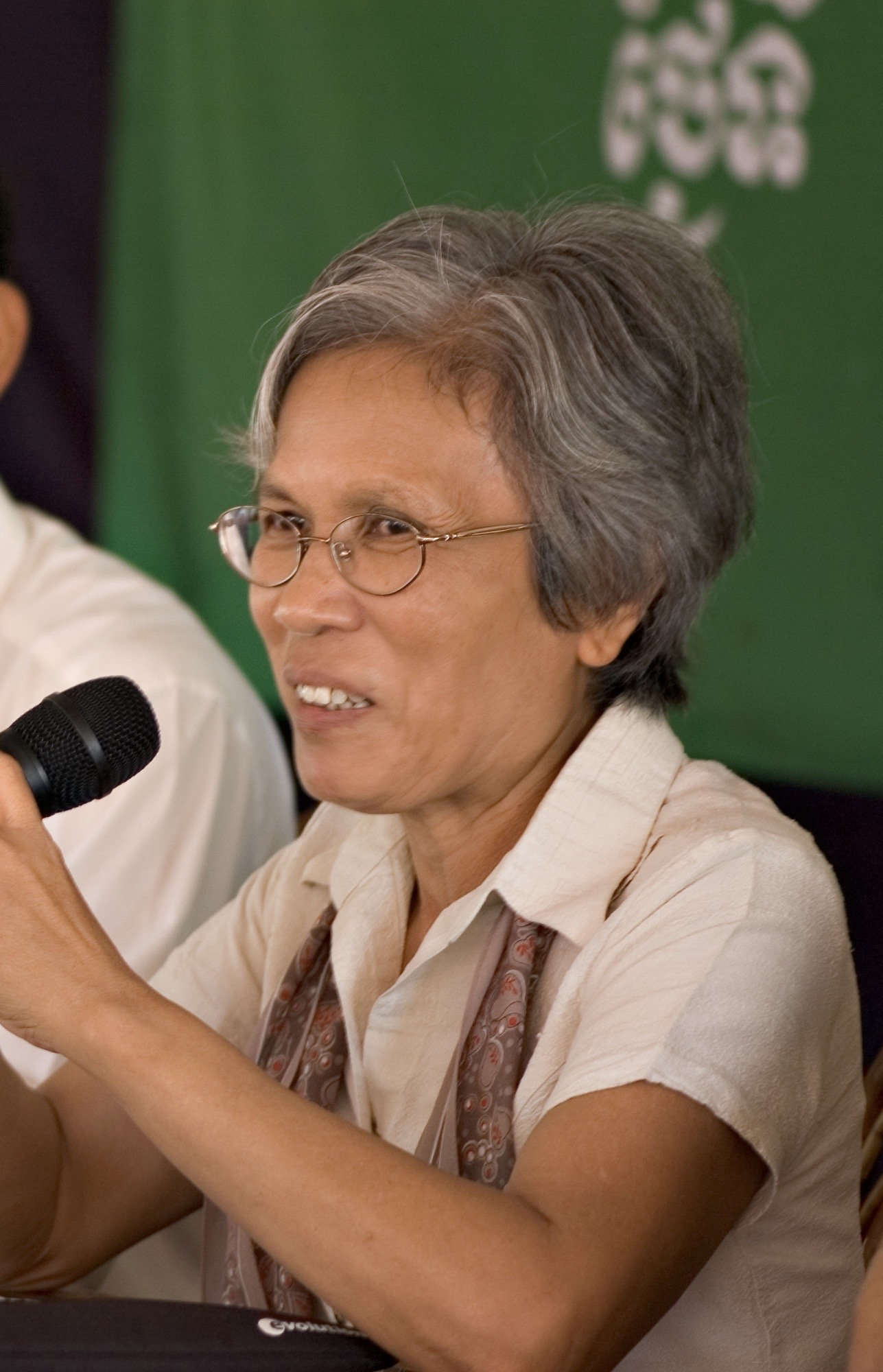
- Born: Ky Chhay-Hun; 25 October 1946 (age 79); Battambang, Cambodia
- Citizenship: French
- Known for: Surviving the Cambodian genocide
- Spouse: Ly Chéany (died 1975)
- Children: 3
- Awards: Knight of the Legion of Honour (2009)

Religious life
- Religion: Buddhism (until 1983); Christianity
- Denomination: Catholicism
- Writing career
- Language: French
- Genre: Memoir, children's literature
- Notable works: Revenue de l'enfer (English: Back from Hell, 2002); Retour au Cambodge (English: Return to Cambodia, 2007)
- Website: www.clairely.com (in French)

Claire Ly (born 25 October 1946) is a survivor of the Cambodian genocide currently residing in France.

== Life in Cambodia ==
Ly was born in Battambang, Cambodia to a well off family. Her given name at birth in Khmer was Chhay-Hun, which means cloud light at dawn (lumière de nuage à l'aurore). She went on to study law and philosophy at university.

Ly started working as a philosophy teacher in Phnom Penh in 1968, before the Khmer Rouge regime took power in 1975. Ly was detained at a forced-labour camp between 1975 and 1979. She fled Cambodia in 1979, seeking refuge at a refugee camp in Thailand before arriving in Alès, France in 1980. Ly has resided in France ever since.

== Life in France ==
Ly continued teaching as she settled in France. She lectures on Buddhism at the Institute of Science and Theology of Religions in Marseille. She has written and given public speeches about her experience of the Cambodian genocide. Ly has criticised the International Criminal Court's failure to bring justice to victims and survivors of the genocide.

=== Writing career ===
Ly wrote about her experience of the genocide in her memoir, Revenue de l'Enfer (English: Back from Hell), first published in 2002. Originally written in French, the book has been translated to Italian and Polish. She went on to write Retour au Cambodge (English: Return to Cambodia) and La Mangrove (English: The Mangrove), published in 2007 and 2011, respectively. She also wrote a children's book, Kosâl & Moni (2007), which tells the story of two young Cambodian kids learning about the Cambodian genocide.

== Personal life ==
Ly's husband Ly Chéany, was a bank manager and did not survive the genocide. Her father, Ky Sean Ho, and two of her brothers, Hun Thieng and Hok Bien, were also killed. She has three children, one of whom, a daughter, was born during her internment at the labour camp without ever meeting her father.

Raised in the Buddhist faith, Ly converted to Catholicism in 1983. Despite this, she never let go of her Buddhist roots. She describes her religious identity as an intra-religious dialogue: "I am not Christian and Buddhist but a Catholic Christian born Buddhist, an important nuance."

Ly was made a Knight of the Legion of Honour in 2009. She was honoured with a tree and a memorial stone in the Garden of the Righteous in Milan in 2012.
