= Battambang =

Provincial capital and third largest city in Cambodia

Battambang បាត់ដំបង Bat Dambang
- City
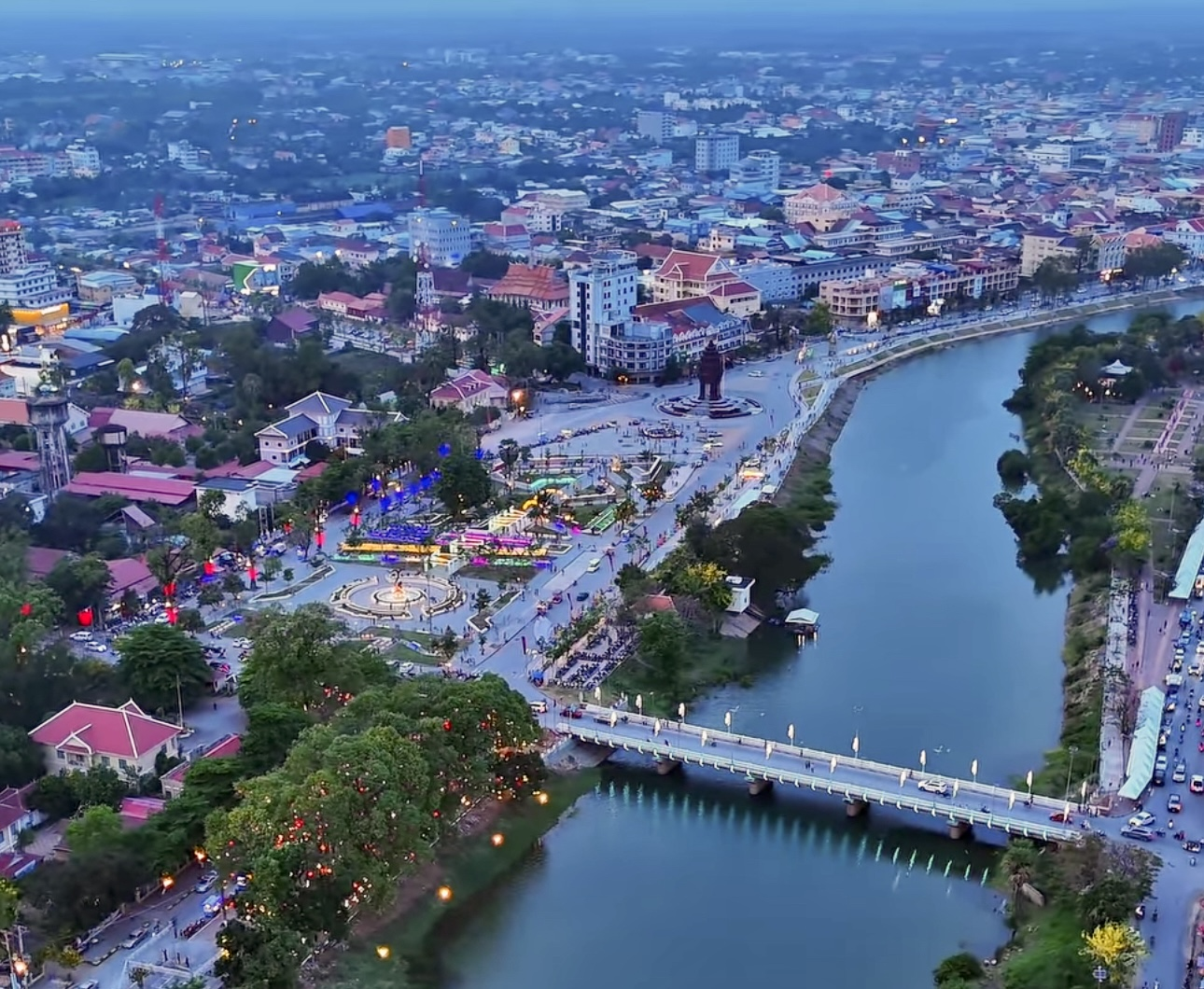
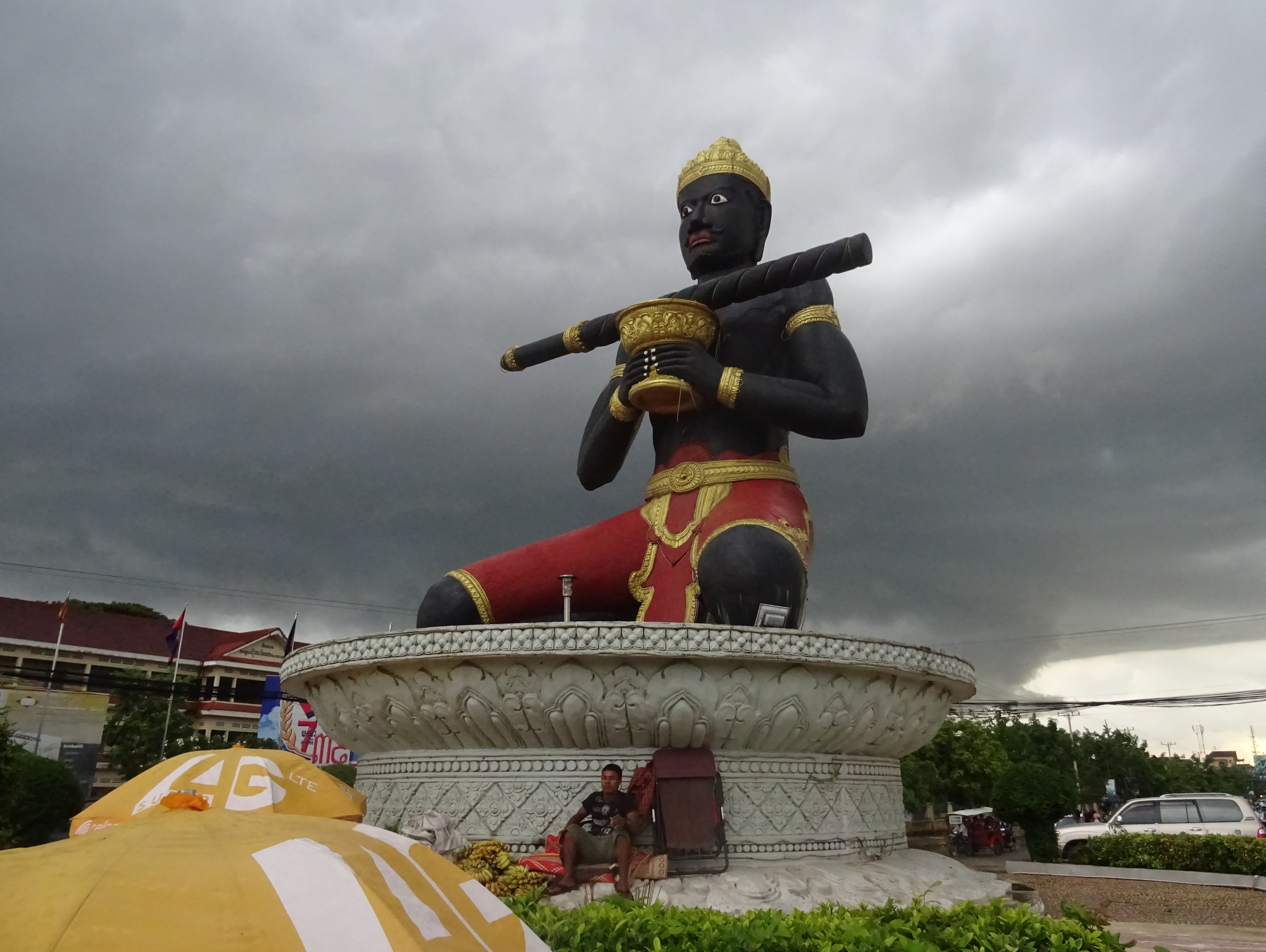
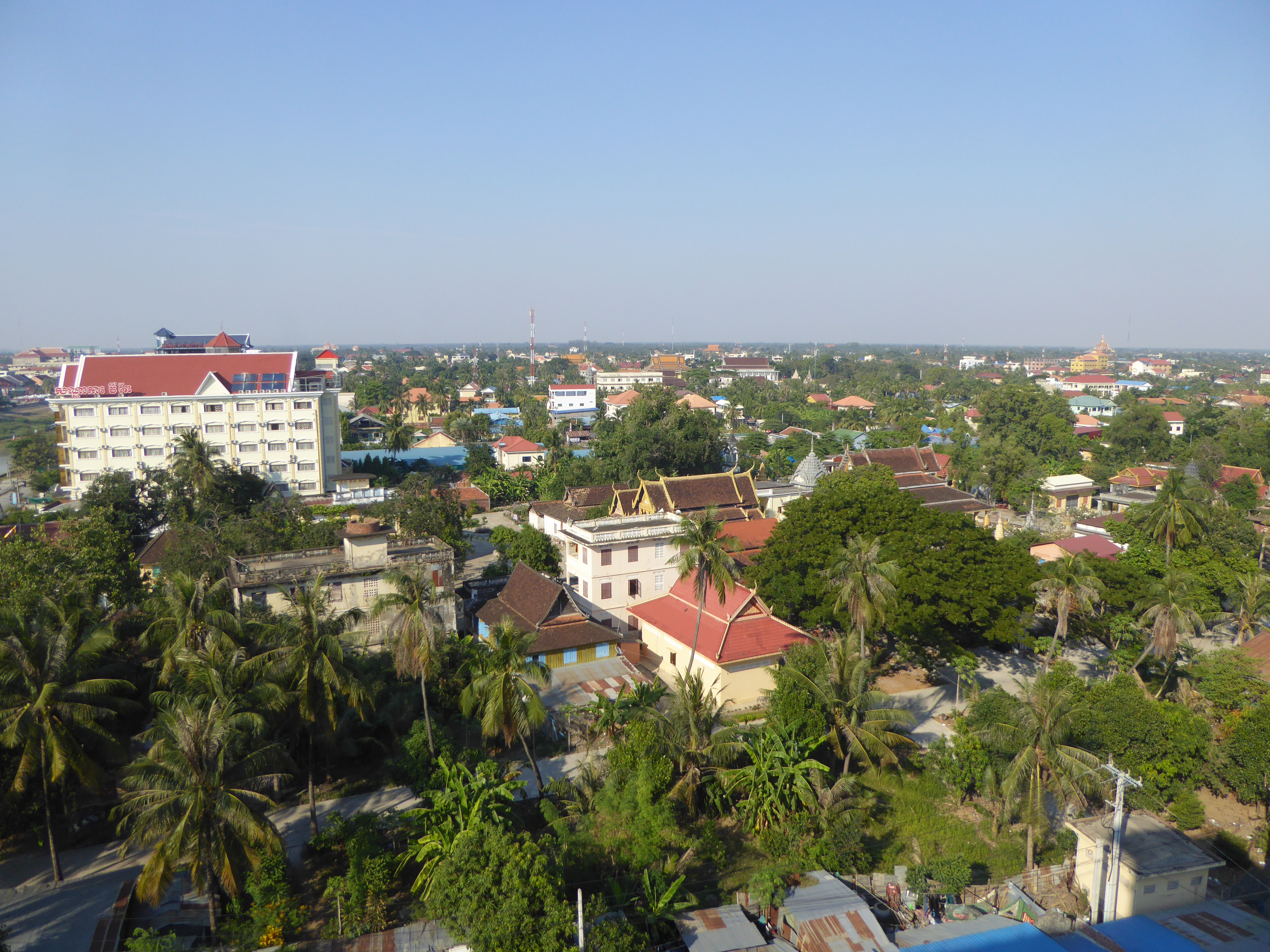
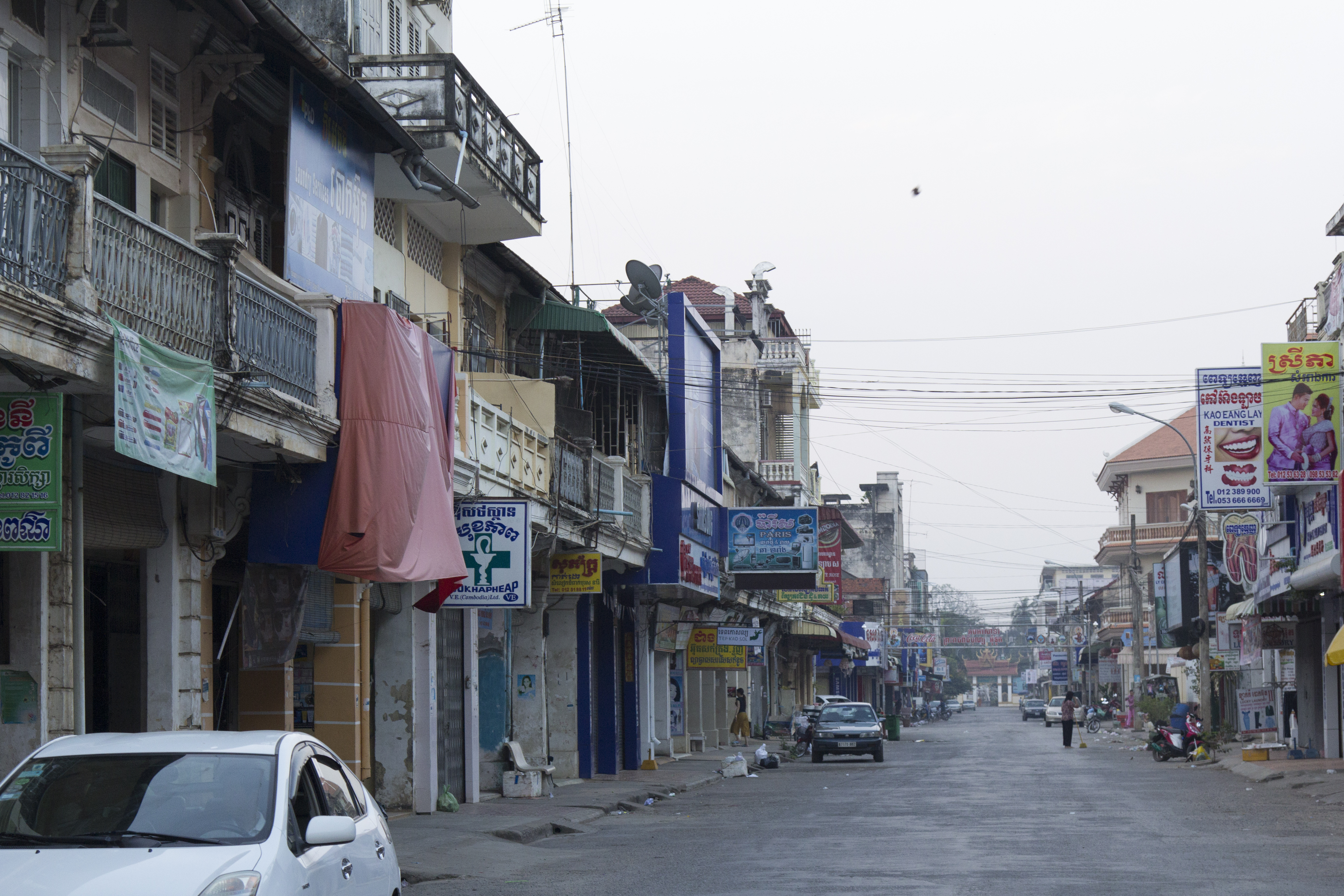
- Aerial view of Battambang Statue of Ta Dumbong Kro Aung Battambang skyline City streets

- Location within Cambodia Location within Asia
- Coordinates: 13°06′N 103°12′E
- Country: Cambodia
- Province: Battambang
- Municipality: Battambang
- Settled: 11th century
- Official: 1907

Government
  - Type: City-municipality

Area +855
  - Total: 293 km^{2} (113 sq mi)
- Elevation: 39 m (128 ft)

Population (2019)
  - Total: 119,251
  - Rank: 3rd
  - Density: 407/km^{2} (1,050/sq mi)
- Time zone: UTC+7 (ICT)
- Area code: +855
- Website: battambang.gov.kh

Battambang

Khmer name
- Khmer: បាត់ដំបង UNGEGN: Băt Dâmbâng; ALA-LC: Pât Ṭaṃpang; IPA: [ɓat ɗɑm.ɓɑːŋ]

Battambang (បាត់ដំបង, Băt Dâmbâng; Khmer pronunciation: [ɓat ɗɑm.ɓɑːŋ]) is the capital of Battambang province and the third largest city in Cambodia. The city is situated on the Sangkae River, which winds its way through the province.

Battambang was founded in the 11th century by the Khmer Empire. It later became a major commercial hub and the capital of the Siamese province of Inner Cambodia. It was reintegrated into Cambodia during French colonisation. During the 20th century, Battambang was Cambodia's second largest city, but it was overtaken by the growth of Siem Reap. It was impacted by conflict and genocide in the 20th century, with the city forcibly evacuated during the Democratic Kampuchea period. It was also the site of fighting during the Khmer Rouge insurgency until the 1990s.

Benefitting from the fertile and productive land surrounding it, Battambang has long been heralded for its food, art, and cultural scene, and it has become a tourism destination. Its French colonial architecture and other heritage buildings have been the subject of local conservation initiatives. Battambang was recognised as a City of Gastronomy and included in the Creative Cities Network by UNESCO in 2023.

== History ==
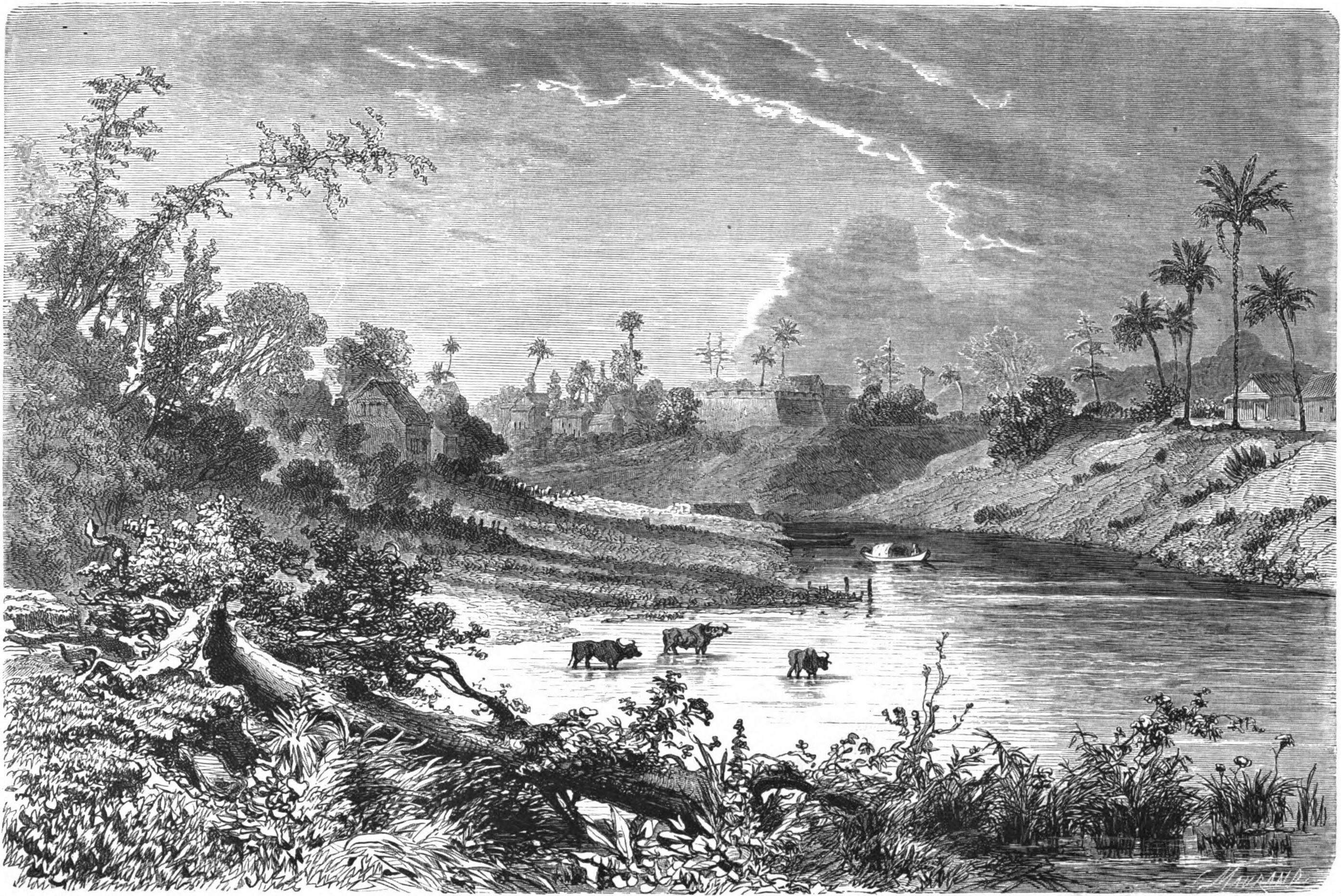
"View of Battambang" (1863) from Le Tour du Monde

Battambang was established as a fishing village in the 11th century, centered around the Sangkae River. In 1795, Siam (modern-day Thailand) annexed much of northwestern Cambodia into the province of Inner Cambodia. The Siamese ruled Battambang as a provincial capital through the Abhaiwongse family. By 1880, Battambang had emerged as an important trading city inhabited by around 2,500 residents, with the river acting as the main transportation link to Phnom Penh and Saigon. Under Thai rule, only one road was built in the city, with housing emerging on both sides of it. Other landmarks constructed included a fort where the governor resided, a market, several pagodas, and a Catholic hospital.

In 1907, Battambang province was ceded to France to be reunited with Cambodia as part of French Indochina. Under the French, an urban layout was developed, which resulted in an enlarged French colonial town. This first attempt at modernization led to well-defined streets laid in a grid pattern and a series of open canals and bridges, in the locality now known as the Heritage Conservation Area. Both riverbanks were linked by the construction of two bridges in 1917. In 1926, a second phase of urban development was implemented, focusing on the west of Battambang, with a newly constructed railway linking the city to Phnom Penh. Residential villas, the central market, and state buildings were also constructed.

In 1953, Prince Norodom Sihanouk chose Battambang as the centre of Cambodia's independence movement, and he spearheaded its modernisation during his leadership of an independent Cambodia. Battambang developed a plan to become an industrial and economic hub for northeast Cambodia. Battambang was Cambodia's second largest city during the 20th century. Textile and garment factories were built by French and Chinese investors, Battambang Airport was constructed, and the railway line was extended to the Thai border at Poipet. To serve the cultural needs of the population, numerous schools and a university were built, as well as a sports centre, a museum, and an exhibition hall.

Like the rest of Cambodia, life in Battambang was affected by the Cambodian Civil War and subsequent genocide. Development stalled in Battambang under the Khmer Republic, and it was abandoned altogether during Democratic Kampuchea, with its population forcibly evacuated into labour camps and land tenure being abolished. Once the genocide began, Battambang Provincial Museum was converted into a prison. The Phnom Sampeau killing caves, a Khmer Rouge execution site, are located around six kilometres (3.7 mi) from the city. In 1980, following a Vietnamese invasion that toppled the Khmer Rouge regime, thousands of refugees returned to the city, but plans for further development could not take place due to lack of investment. The surrounding province remained a stronghold for Khmer Rouge insurgents into the 1990s. Battambang city was besieged by Khmer Rouge guerrillas in 1990, but they failed to capture it. Conflict continued in and around the city until 1997.

Starting in 1989, when private property rights were reintroduced, Battambang began to develop an economy around agricultural products, and small businesses emerged. The city's municipal government established a Heritage Protection Area in 2009 to safeguard around 800 historic buildings. Following investment from GIZ, the municipality's "Master Development Plan 2030" was endorsed by the national government in 2015, making it the only Cambodian city besides Phnom Penh to have such a plan.

In 2022, the Provincial Department of Culture and Fine Arts listed ancient temples, prehistoric sites, colonial buildings, and traditional Khmer houses as buildings under conservation.

== Demographics ==
Official records of the population of Battambang have been kept since 1998, when the population was reported to be 138,271. According to the 2019 census, Battambang city had a total population of 119,251, a decline of 1.9% since 2008.

The city's nine universities have been cited as a contributing factor to attracting 9,579 students from the surrounding region, as of 2016.

=== Religion ===
==== Buddhism ====
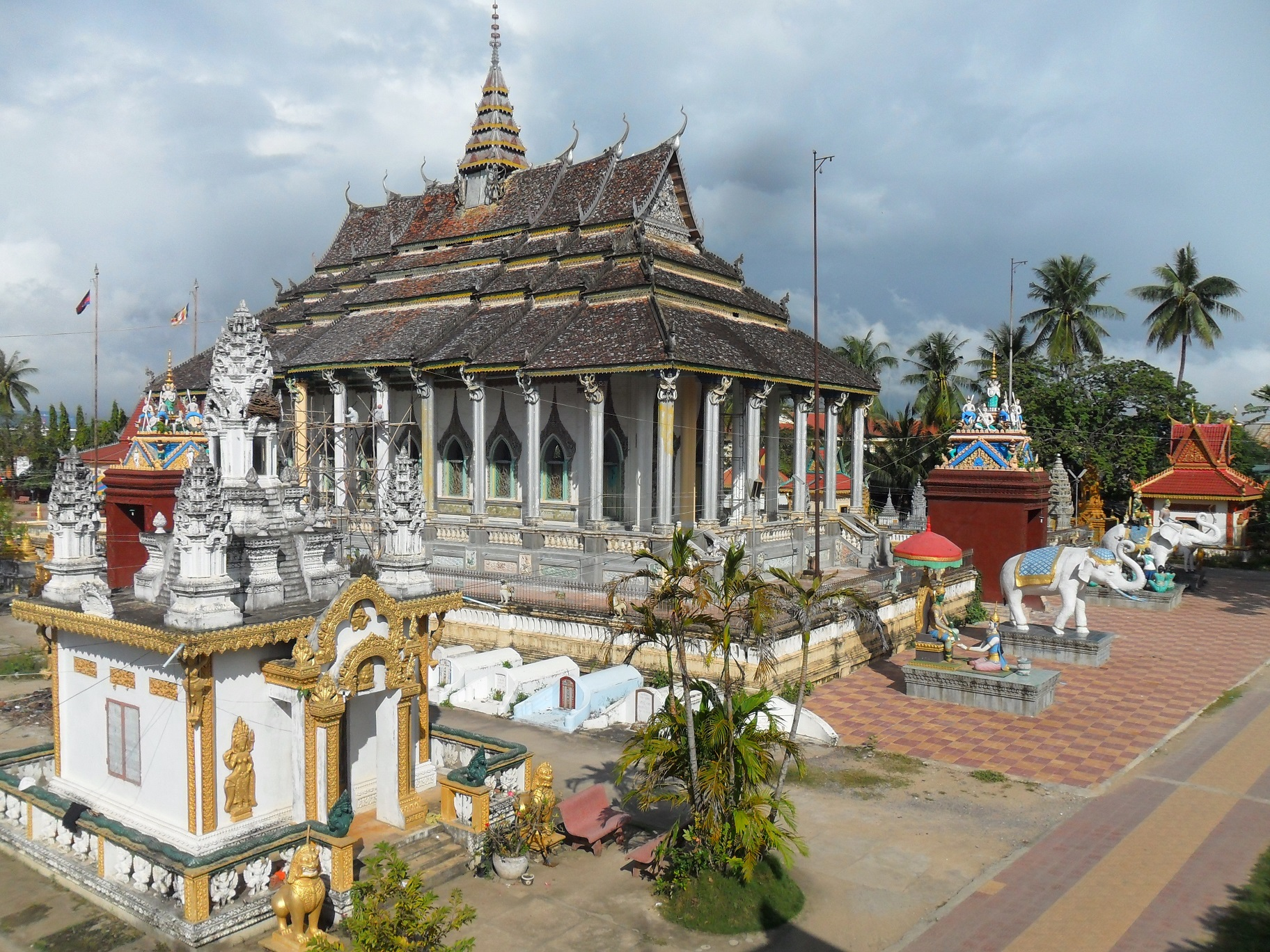
Wat Domrei Sar

Battambang is home to a number of Buddhist pagodas. In 2022, 31 of these received heritage status, all of them being over 60 years old, and they have been promoted for domestic religious tourism. Thai architecture and the Rattanakosin style are visible on the pagodas and stupas built during Siamese rule. Pagodas built later display an architectural style unique to Battambang. Wat Damrei Sar, built in the 19th century, is the oldest pagoda in the city.

==== Catholicism ====
Battambang has a small Catholic community and an apostolic prefecture. The Catholic community in Cambodia was heavily persecuted during the Khmer Rouge era, and the Our Lady of the Assumption Cathedral was destroyed.

==== Bahá'í ====
Around seven kilometres (4.3 mi) south of Battambang, in Odambang commune, stands the city's Bahá'í House of Worship. Inaugurated in 2017, the round, nine-sided edifice features a central dome, spire, and winged parapets.

== Government and infrastructure ==
=== Government ===
Under the 1993 constitution of Cambodia, the urban planning of Battambang is governed by national legislation and further by the sub-national provincial and municipal authorities. The city is further subdivided into 10 sangkat and 62 villages, each with their own local councils. The city's annual budget of US$625,000 (as of 2019) from the national government is supplemented by international development funds and private investment, allowing it to build improved infrastructure such as sewage treatment and roads.

=== Infrastructure and development ===
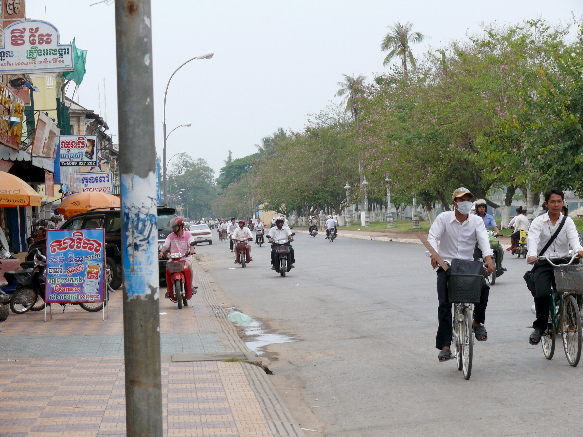
Battambang in 2009

Since the 1993 elections, as Cambodia shifted to a market economy and entered its modern post-conflict era, the Battambang government has struggled to restore basic infrastructure such as a water supply. The local government has since received a mixture of private sector and NGO support.

Battambang received a US$60 million loan from the Asian Development Bank in 2023 to improve drainage, sewerage, and roads. The city's "Smart City Master Plan" also outlines expanding access to clean water, development of industry and tourism, walkability, and improving waste management.

Battambang Provincial Referral Hospital serves the city and its surrounding districts, with 270 beds, and it admits around 2,000 patients per month.

The city has some slum areas inhabited by the urban poor that are particularly prone to climate change–related impacts, such as flooding. Access to education, healthcare, water, and electricity is generally available to slum dwellers, despite limited employment opportunities.

== Economy ==
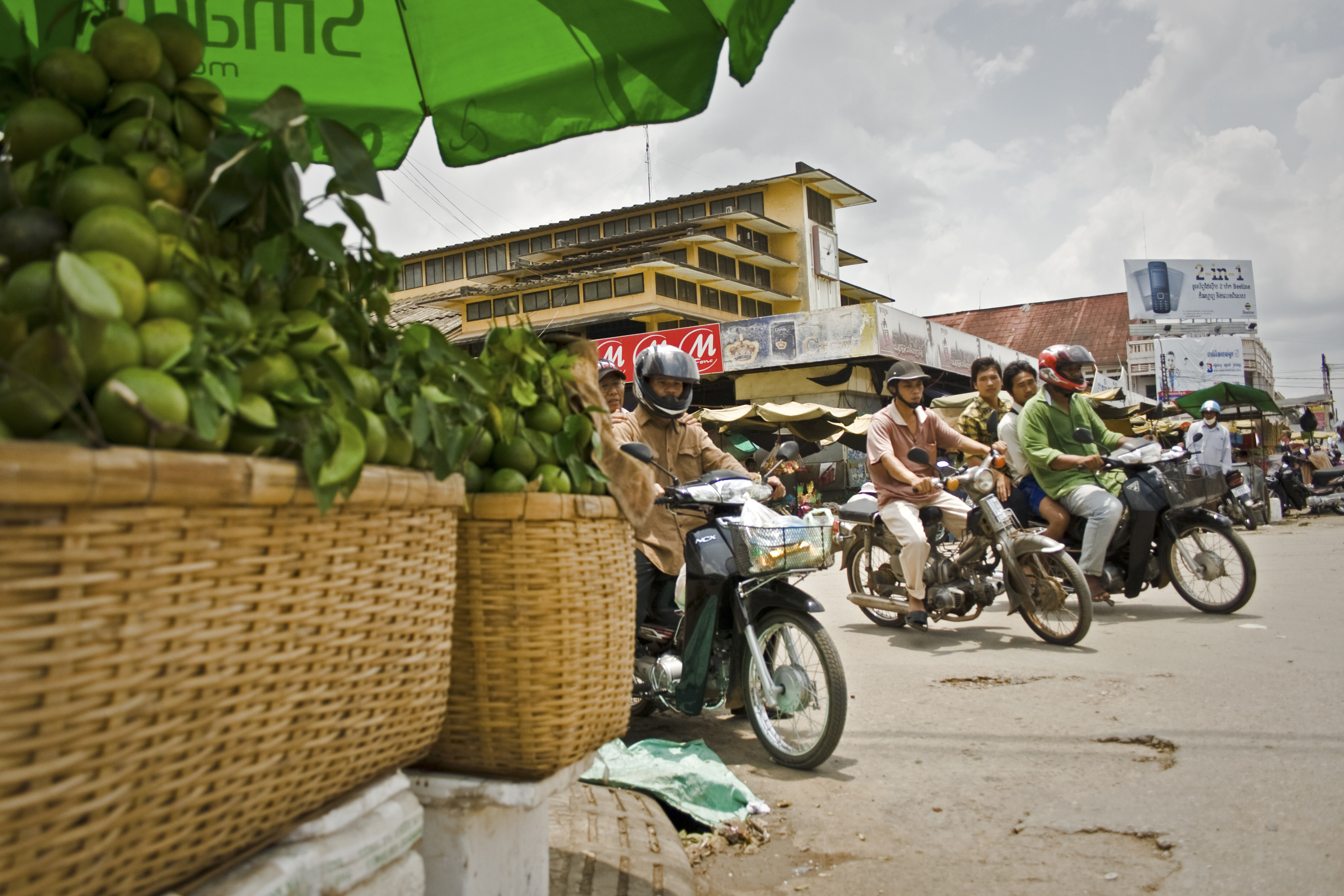
Fruits for sale near Psar Nath in 2009

Battambang's numerous markets within its urban center allow it to serve as an economic hub for the province. In 2018, 71.3% of employed people in the city worked in services—a classification under the Department of Planning that includes agricultural processing, retail, tourism, and construction. Agriculture employed 27.2% of the population, and 1.5% worked in crafts. The majority of businesses are in homes or are informally operated in Battambang's streets. Real estate in the city rapidly expanded during the 2010s.

Psar Nath is Battambang's central market, built in 1936 in Art Deco style. It was damaged in an electrical fire in 2020.

Battambang's heritage buildings and culture have led to the growth of its tourism sector. However, it attracts fewer international tourists than other Cambodian cities, particularly Siem Reap. In 2023, Battambang governor Sok Lu announced plans to upgrade Battambang Airport and prepare riverside development and 800 traditional Khmer houses for future tourism expansion.

== Culture ==
Battambang is a hub for Cambodian art, music, and culture, with many famous artists and singers born or based in the city. The Khmer Rouge era led to the persecution or disappearance of many prominent artists and musicians as well as a decline in the arts scene, but efforts have been made to revitalize it post-conflict. Battambang features art galleries and workshops exhibiting local artists and sculptors. The cultural non-governmental organization Phare Ponleu Selpak, which provides free arts education and training to young, disadvantaged people, is based in Battambang and also coordinates a contemporary circus. Battambang hosts the annual, three-day Chumnor Arts Festival, with creative workshops and performances.

Battambang Provincial Museum was built in 1968 and features art as well as cultural and archaeological artefacts.

=== Cuisine ===
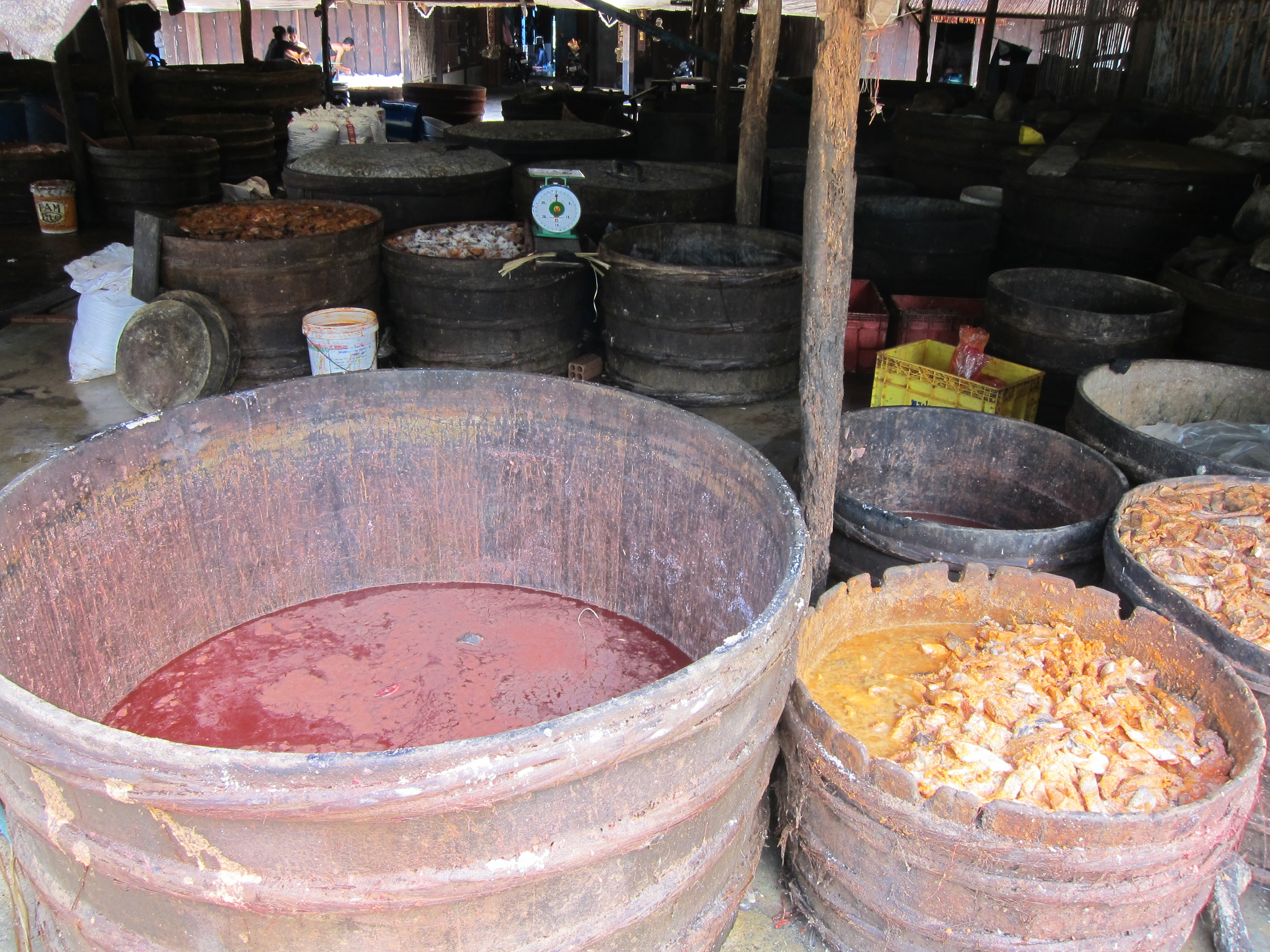
Prahok being made in Battambang

The city is known for its culinary traditions, owing to the fertile agricultural lands of the province. Battambang province is considered the "rice bowl of Cambodia", with the city harbouring many mills that process rice for national and international markets. Local dishes include fried bananas and rice noodles, and Battambang is famous for its jasmine rice. On 31 October 2023, Battambang was one of 55 cities added to UNESCO's Creative Cities Network, where it was listed as a City of Gastronomy. It is the first Cambodian city to join the network. UNESCO recognised Battambang's initiatives in promoting Khmer cuisine and street food as well as incorporating culture into urban development.

== Transportation ==
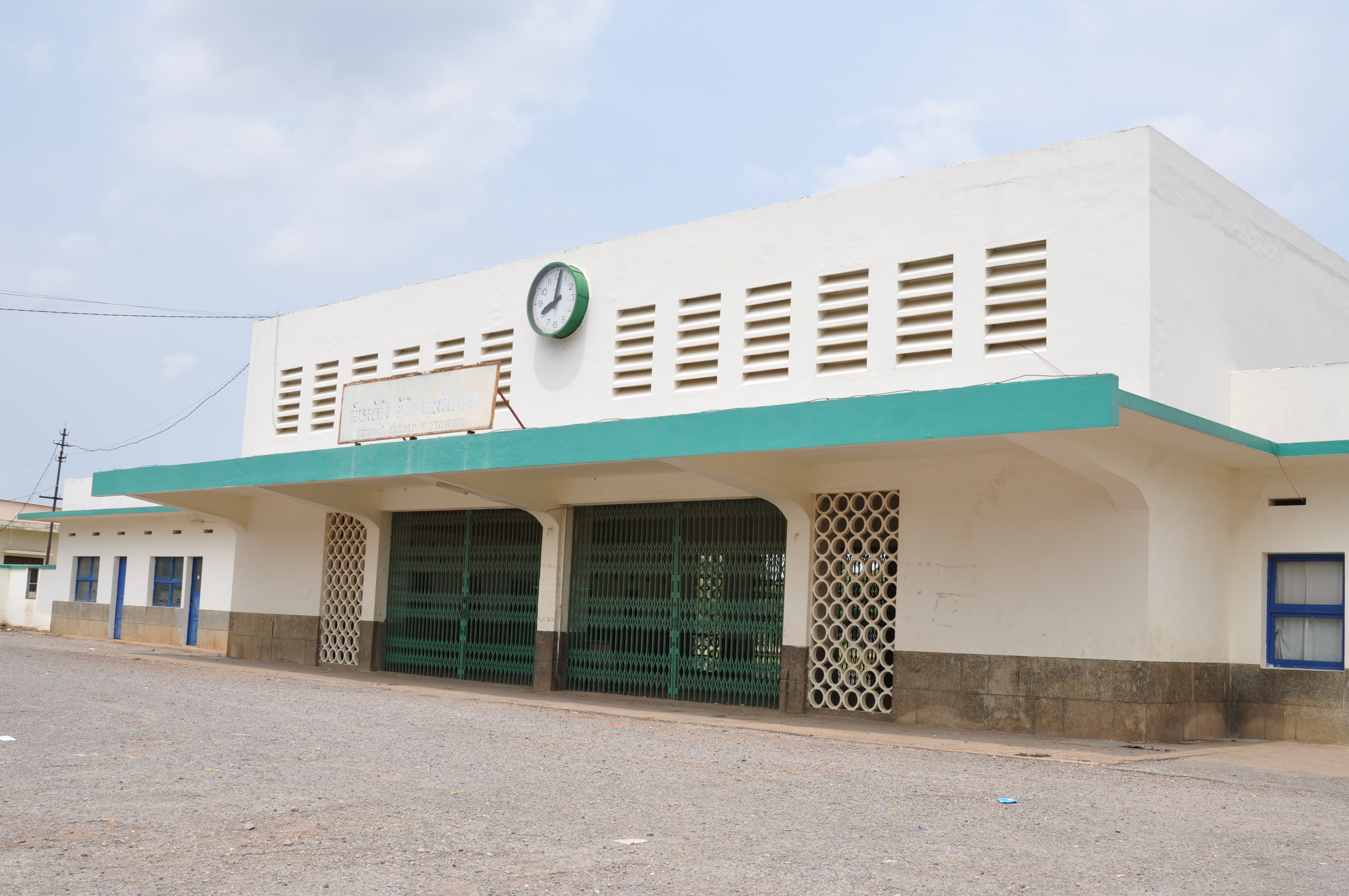
Battambang railway station

Battambang is linked via National Highway 5 to Phnom Penh and Bangkok, and it sits on National Road 57, which connects it to the Thai border via Pailin province.

The city has long been connected to Cambodia's rail network, but the system was abandoned during the Khmer Rouge era. Rehabilitation of the railway reconnected Battambang railway station to Serei Saophoan in 2018, with plans to complete the line to connect the city to Phnom Penh.

The norry, or bamboo train, runs four kilometres (2.5 mi) from Prasat Banan to Chhoeuteal commune. Previously located on railway tracks outside the city, it was relocated in 2017 to make way for the resumption of railway traffic. It has since become a tourist attraction.

Battambang Airport was established in 1968, with a flight connection to Phnom Penh. The airport was closed during the civil war and was later used by the military, before being closed again in 1991. It was used by the United Nations Transitional Authority in Cambodia to support helicopter operations in 1992 and 1993. Plans were announced to upgrade it to meet the capacity of Siem Reap International Airport in 2019, but these were delayed by the COVID-19 pandemic. Since its closure, it has been used as a public park and food market.

There is a boat connection between Battambang and Siem Reap via the Sangkae River, which takes between six and seven hours.

== Climate ==
Battambang has a tropical savanna climate (Köppen: Aw). The city is vulnerable to climate change impacts such as extreme heat and flooding.

Climate data for Battambang (1982–2024)
Month	Jan	Feb	Mar	Apr	May	Jun	Jul	Aug	Sep	Oct	Nov	Dec	Year
Mean daily maximum °C (°F)	31.6 (88.9)	33.1 (91.6)	35.2 (95.4)	35.5 (95.9)	34.7 (94.5)	33.6 (92.5)	32.6 (90.7)	32.9 (91.2)	32.9 (91.2)	32.4 (90.3)	31.9 (89.4)	30.5 (86.9)	33.1 (91.5)
Mean daily minimum °C (°F)	20.1 (68.2)	21.4 (70.5)	23.9 (75.0)	25.0 (77.0)	25.1 (77.2)	24.8 (76.6)	24.8 (76.6)	24.4 (75.9)	24.3 (75.7)	23.8 (74.8)	22.6 (72.7)	20.1 (68.2)	23.4 (74.0)
Average precipitation mm (inches)	13.7 (0.54)	33.8 (1.33)	78.3 (3.08)	140.9 (5.55)	265.4 (10.45)	245.6 (9.67)	273.6 (10.77)	362.1 (14.26)	406.4 (16.00)	430.9 (16.96)	163.6 (6.44)	12.0 (0.47)	2,426.3 (95.52)
Source: World Meteorological Organization

== Notable people ==
- G-Devith – musician
- Sar Kheng – politician
- Kalyanee Mam – filmmaker
- Vann Nath – painter, artist, writer, and human rights activist
- Chhom Nimol – musician
- Sopheap Pich – sculptor and artist
- Arn Chorn-Pond – human rights activist
- Pen Ran – singer-songwriter
- Am Rong – soldier and filmmaker
- Mao Sareth – musician
- Ros Serey Sothea – singer ("Queen with the Golden Voice")
- Sinn Sisamouth – musician (not born in Battambang but lived there during childhood)

== Twin towns and sister cities ==
- Da Nang, Vietnam
- Incheon, South Korea
- (United States) Stockton, California, US
