= Phare Circus =

Cambodian contemporary circus troupe

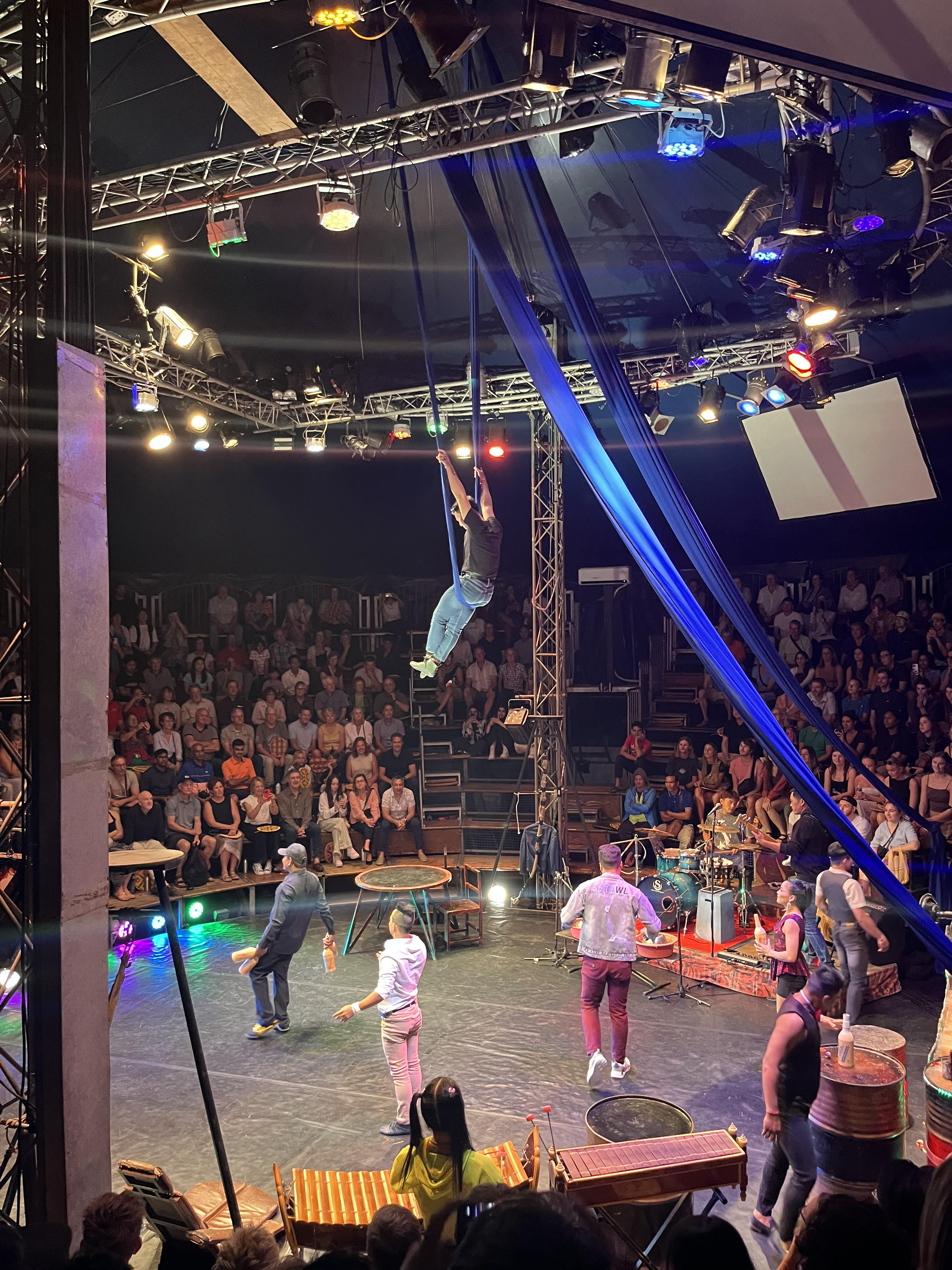
A Phare Circus performance

Phare Circus (Khmer: សៀកហ្វារ) is a contemporary circus troupe based in Siem Reap, Cambodia. The performances blend traditional and modern circus arts with Cambodian storytelling, drama, dance, live music, and visual arts. The performances are created by the artists themselves, drawing from their own lives, Cambodian history, folklore, and contemporary society.

== History and organization ==
The origins trace back to 1985 at Site Two Refugee Camp in Thailand where French humanitarian Veronique Decrop used drawing classes as art therapy to help young refugees fleeing the Khmer Rouge. In 1995, Veronique Decrop with nine former refugees founded Phare Ponleu Selpak (PPS) in Battambang with the goals of using art to heal the community after the war, revive Cambodian arts, and to alleviate poverty.

PCC is part of Phare Performing Social Enterprise (PPSE), a social enterprise established in 2013 as an extension of the non-profit Phare Ponleu Selpak (PPS) school in Battambang to fund the school and sustain jobs for the graduates.

== Reception ==
PCC has been recognized by Tripadvisor with the "Certificate of Excellence" and Lonely Planet as a "Top Choice" for its theater in Siem Reap. Together, PCC and PPS set the Guinness World Records for the Longest Circus Performance. PCC was awarded Arival Travel's "Social Purpose / Community Engagement" award in 2023.

The theater has been praised for its circus troupes who have presented in platforms both locally and internationally including Ringling International Arts Festival, Oz Asia Festival in Adelaide, Australia, La Tohu in Montreal, the New Victory Theater in New York, and Sydney Festival in Sydney, Australia. Their production, "White Gold" received acclaim as a "Critic Pick" in The New York Times in December 2023.

== Collaborations ==
PCC collaborated with Michael Laub and Cambodian Space Project on "Galaxy Khmer", which appeared at the HAU Theater in Berlin, Germany and Bergen, Norway in January 2014.It also collaborated with Global Arts Corps for "See You Yesterday", which was performed at the Ubumuntu Arts Festival in Kigali, Rwanda in July 2016.
