= Kear =

KEAR or Kear may refer to:

- Janet Kear (1933–2004), English ornithologist and conservationist
- Kear (khum), a khum in Battambang Province in north-western Cambodia
- Kearney Regional Airport in Nebraska, ICAO code KEAR
- KEAR (AM), a radio station (610 AM) licensed to San Francisco, California, United States
- KLLC, a radio station (97.3 FM) licensed to San Francisco, California, United States, which used the call sign KEAR from 1956 to 1978
- KFRC-FM, a radio station (106.9 FM) licensed to San Francisco, California, United States, which used the call sign KEAR from 1978 to October 2005
- KEBR (FM), a radio station (88.1 FM) licensed to Sacramento, California, United States, which held the call sign KEAR-FM from 2005 to 2015
