= Battambang railway station =

Railway station in Cambodia

Coordinates: 13.097868°N 103.194539°E

Battambang ក្រុងបាត់ដំបង
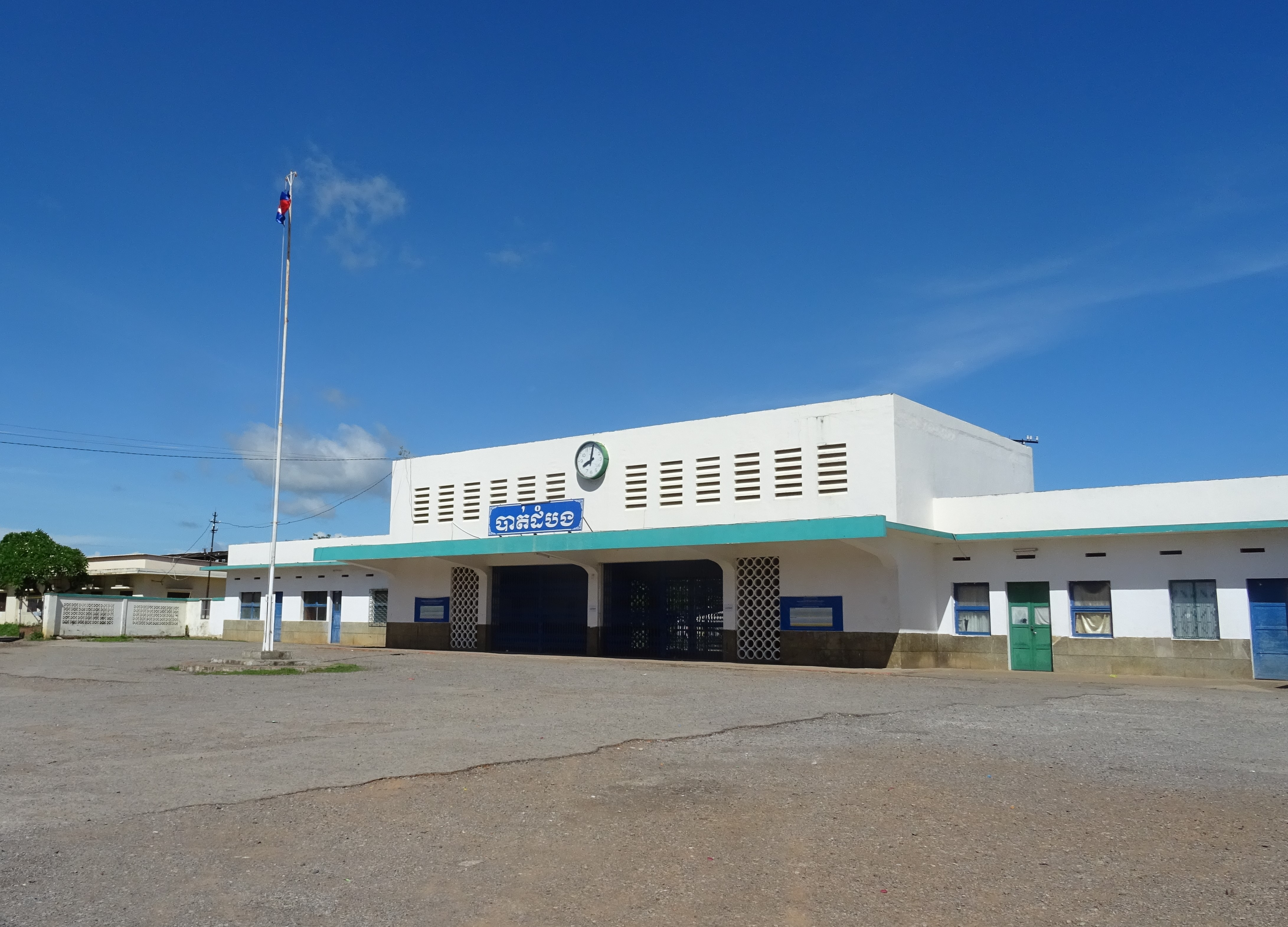

General information
- Location: Krong Battambang; Battambang Province; Cambodia
- Operator: Royal Railways of Cambodia
- Line: Phnom Penh–Poipet Line
- Platforms: 1 island platform 1 side platform
- Tracks: 2

Construction
- Structure type: At-grade

History
- Opened: July 1933
- Closed: 2009
- Rebuilt: 2018

Services
Preceding station	Royal Railways	Following station
Thmor Kor towards Poipet	Northern Line	Phnom Thiphdei towards Phnom Penh
Location

Battambang railway station is a railway station in Battambang, the capital city of Battambang province in northwestern Cambodia.

== Location ==
The station and its rail tracks are at the Phnom Penh–Poipet(–Bangkok) line at the west side of the town Battambang in Battambang province.

== Buildings ==
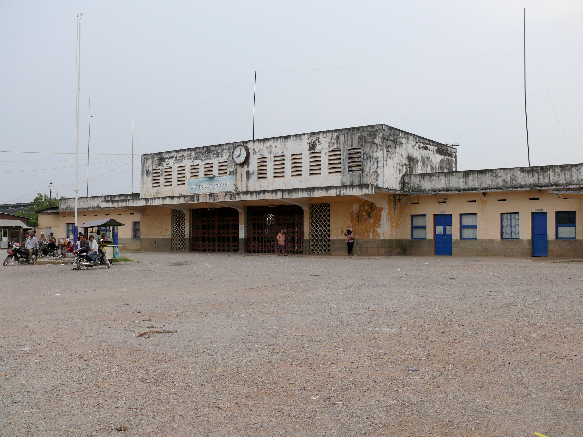
Battambang Royal Railway Station, 2009

The station building is well preserved and was repainted after taking the track out. The clock above the entrance stands still at 8:02 o'clock since an unknown day.

As of January 2018 the rail tracks are being replaced. Beyond them, there are ruined remains of warehouses, signal boxes and rolling stock. Although dilapidated, some of them are use for living, storage or business.

== Railway line ==
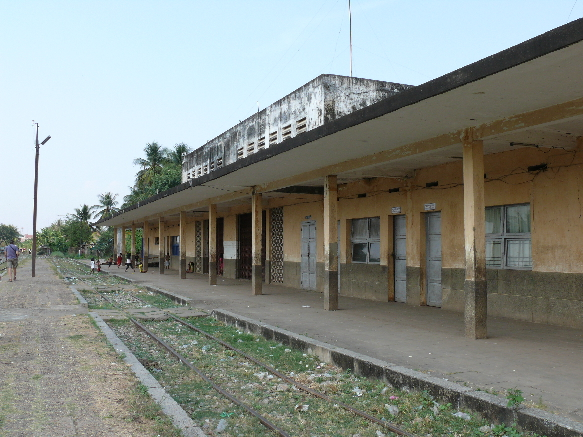
Platform of Battambang Royal railway station, 2009

The line through Battambang has a gauge of 1,000 mm (3 ft 3 3/8 in) (metre gauge). It was completed by the Thais, after the French had done the groundbreaking work during World War II. Battambang was occupied by Thailand during the war.

The railway was heavily attacked by artillery during the Cambodian Civil War, and the Khmer Rouge sabotaged the track at several locations. Limited rail traffic was provided in the 1980s between Battambang and Phnom Penh. The ride covering the distance of less than 300 kilometres (190 mi) lasted 14 hours. However, a road trip lasted 2–3 days and was more demanding and dangerous. Railway services were completely cancelled in 2009 due to poor track conditions, but the line has been reopened in July 2018. Trains to the Thai border now operate every second day, and a service from Phnom Penh to Bangkok is planned.

== List of stations ==
- Phnom Penh
- Pursat
- Moung Ruessei
- Battambang
- Sisophon
- Poipet

== Trivia ==
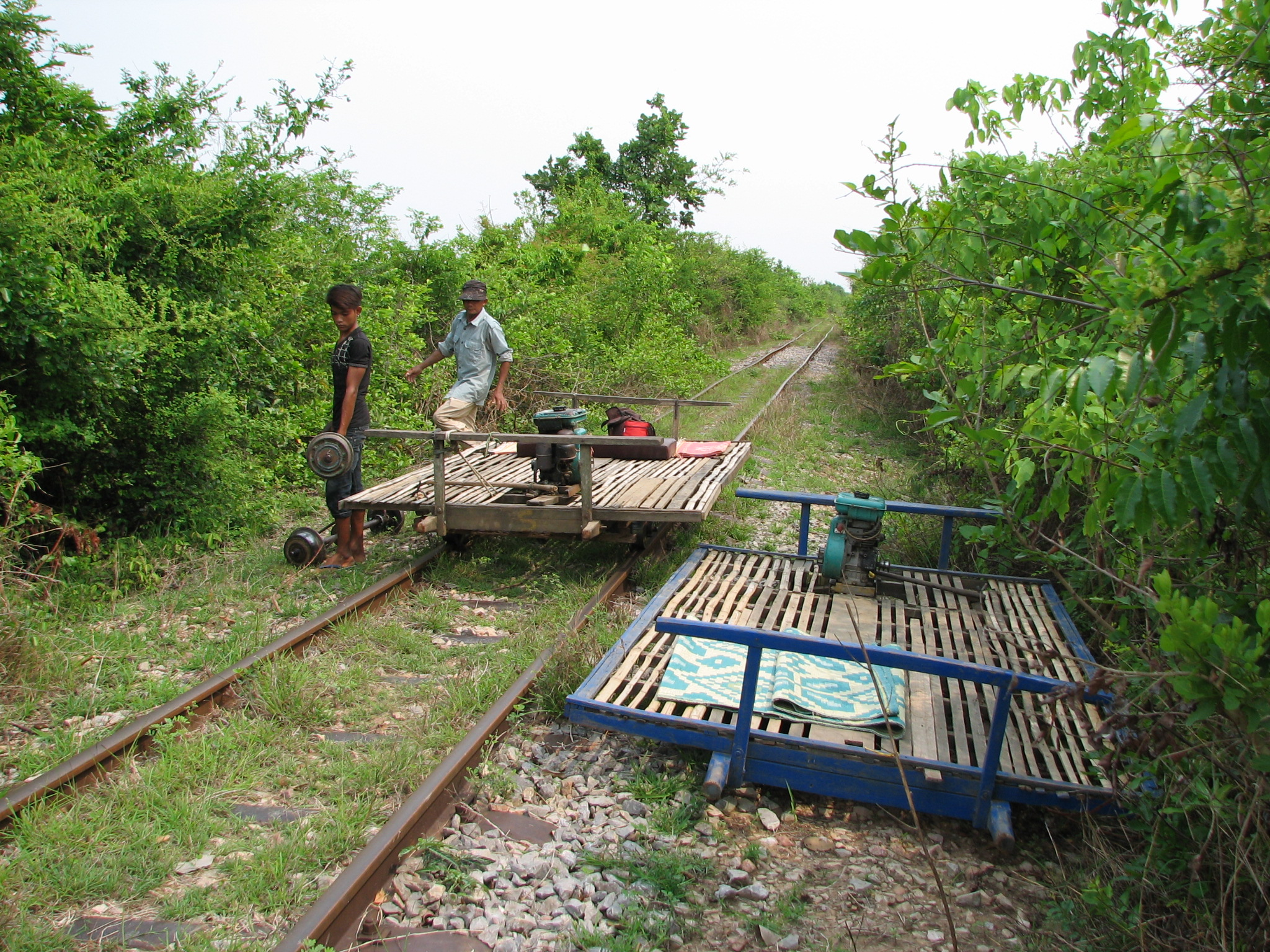
Bamboo Railway in south-east Battambang

Approximately 4 kilometres (2.5 mi) south-east of Battambang Royal railway station started the norry or Bamboo Train.
