= Prey Svay =

Prey Svay ឃុំព្រៃស្វាយ
- Commune
- Location within Cambodia
- Country: Cambodia
- Province: Battambang Province
- District: Moung Ruessei District
- Villages: 9
- Time zone: UTC+07

Prey Svay is a khum (commune) of Moung Ruessei District in Battambang Province in north-western Cambodia.

== Villages ==
- Kor
- Cham Ro'a
- Thnal Bambaek
- Rumchek
- Tuol Thnong
- Tuol Skor
- Kalaom Phluk
- Srama Meas
- Svay Jrum
- Prey Svay
- Prey Preal
