= Prey Touch =

Coordinates: 12°54′N 103°22′E

Prey Touch ឃុំព្រៃតូច
- Commune
- Interactive map of Prey Touch
- Country: Cambodia
- Province: Battambang Province
- District: Moung Ruessei District
- Villages: 6
- Time zone: UTC+07

Prey Touch is a khum (commune) of Moung Ruessei District in Battambang Province in north-western Cambodia.

== Villages ==
- Koun Khlong
- Dob Krasang
- Phum Thmei
- Prey Touch
- Prean Nil
- Stueng Chork
