= Moung =

Coordinates: 12°46′N 103°27′E

Moung ឃុំមោង
- Commune
- Interactive map of Moung
- Country: Cambodia
- Province: Battambang Province
- District: Moung Ruessei District
- Villages: 13
- Time zone: UTC+07

Moung (Khmer: ឃុំមោង) is a khum (commune) of Moung Ruessei District in Battambang Province in north-western Cambodia.

== Villages ==
- Paen
- Ou Krabau
- Kaoh Char
- Ruessei Muoy
- Roluos
- Ruessei Pir
- Kansai Banteay
- Ra
- Daeum Doung
- Moung
- Pralay
- Ta Tok Muoy
- Ta Tok Pir
