= Madeleine Giteau =

French historian

Madeleine Giteau (Nantes, 1918 – February 2005) was a French historian and member of the Ecole française d'Extrême-Orient, who devoted a great part of her life to research involving Laotian and Cambodian art, especially Khmer sculpture and iconography.

She was the last French curator of Cambodia's National Museum (known as the Albert Sarraut Museum) in Phnom Penh from 1956 to 1966. In 1963, she oversaw the reorganization of the Wat Po Veal and the Battambang Provincial Museum.

She died at the age of 86 in February 2005.

== Selected bibliography ==
- 1956 - Histoire du Cambodge, Paris, Hattier.
- 1960 - Guide du musée national [de Phnom Penh], 2 vol. (1. La sculpture; 2. Pièces archéologiques et stèles), Phnom Penh.
- 1965 - Les Khmers. Sculptures khmères, reflets de la civilisation d’Angkor, Fribourg, Office du Livre.
- 1969 - Le bornage rituel des temples bouddhiques au Cambodge, Paris, EFEO (PEFEO, 68), 153 p., 29 pl.
- 1974 - Histoire d’Angkor, Paris, PUF (Que sais-je ?, 1580), [réimpr. Paris, Kailash, 1996].
- 1975 - Iconographie du Cambodge post-angkorien, Paris, EFEO (PEFEO, 100), 381 p., 88 pl.
- 1976 - Angkor, un peuple, un art, Fribourg, Office du Livre.
- 1994 - Regards sur Angkor, Paris, Éditions Chapitre Douze.
- 1997 - (with Danielle Guéret), L’art khmer, reflet des civilisations d’Angkor, Paris, ASA & Somogy.
- 2001 - Art et archéologie du Laos, Paris, Picard.
