= Robas Mongkol =

Coordinates: 12°44′N 103°27′E

Robas Mongkol ឃុំរបស់មង្គល
- Commune
- Interactive map of Robas Mongkol
- Country: Cambodia
- Province: Battambang Province
- District: Moung Ruessei District
- Villages: 12
- Time zone: UTC+07

Robas Mongkol is a khum (commune) of Moung Ruessei District in Battambang Province in north-western Cambodia.

== Villages ==
- Boeng Bei
- Kuoy Chik Dei
- Preaek Am
- Koun K'aek Muoy
- Koun K'aek Pir
- Robas Mongkol
- Anlong Koub
- Prey Prum Muoy
- Prey Prum Pir
- Anlong Tamok
- Anlong Trach
- Phreah Theat
