= Kakaoh =

Commune in Moung Ruessei District, Battambang Province, Cambodia

Kakaoh ឃុំកកោះ
- Commune
- Location within Cambodia
- Coordinates: 12°50′25″N 103°23′56″E
- Country: Cambodia
- Province: Battambang Province
- District: Moung Ruessei District
- Villages: 8
- Time zone: UTC+07
- Geocode: 020607

Kakaoh (Khmer: ឃុំកកោះ) is a khum (commune) of Moung Ruessei District in Battambang Province in north-western Cambodia.

== Villages ==
- Tuol Prum Muoy
- Tuol Prum Pir
- Chak Touch
- Chak Thum
- Kakaoh
- Srae Ou
- Ph'ieng
- Rumchek
