= Ta Loas =

Coordinates: 12°48′N 103°28′E

Ta Loas ឃុំតាលាស់
- Commune
- Interactive map of Ta Loas
- Country: Cambodia
- Province: Battambang Province
- District: Moung Ruessei District
- Villages: 9
- Time zone: UTC+07

Ta Loas (Khmer: ឃុំតាលាស់) is a khum (commune) of Moung Ruessei District in Battambang Province in north-western Cambodia.

== Villages ==
- Ma Naok
- Suosdei
- Sdei Stueng
- Stueng Thmei
- Veal
- Voat Chas
- Chong Pralay
- Pralay Sdau
- Tras
