= Ruessei Krang =

Coordinates: 12°42′N 103°36′E

Ruessei Krang ឃុំឫស្សីក្រាំង
- Commune
- Interactive map of Ruessei Krang
- Country: Cambodia
- Province: Battambang Province
- District: Moung Ruessei District
- Villages: 10
- Time zone: UTC+07

Ruessei Krang (Khmer: ឃុំឫស្សីក្រាំង) is a khum (commune) of Moung Ruessei District in Battambang Province in north-western Cambodia.

== Villages ==
- Neak Ta Tvear
- Yeun Mean
- Tuol Snuol
- Chrey Run
- Tuol Roka
- Nikom Kraom
- Srah Chineang
- Pech Changvar
- Ampil Chhung
- Thnal Bat
