= Chrey, Moung Ruessei =

Commune in Moung Ruessei District, Battambang Province, Cambodia

Chrey ឃុំជ្រៃ
- Commune
- Location within Cambodia
- Coordinates: 12°54′27″N 103°35′39″E
- Country: Cambodia
- Province: Battambang Province
- District: Moung Ruessei District
- Villages: 8
- Time zone: UTC+07
- Geocode: 020605

Chrey (Khmer: ឃុំជ្រៃ) is a khum (commune) of Moung Ruessei District in Battambang Province in north-western Cambodia.

== Villages ==
- Doun Tri
- Angkrong
- Tuol Ta Thon
- Mreah Prov
- Chrey Muoy
- Chrey Pir
- Chrey Cheung
- Chong Chamnay
