= Battambang Provincial Museum =

Museum in Cambodia

Battambang Provincial Museum is a museum in Kamkor village, Svay Por commune, Battambang Province, western Cambodia. It was established in 1963 by Madeleine Giteau. It houses a notable pre and Angkorian collection of pottery, statuary, and musical instruments. In 1975, after the Khmer Rouge led by Saloth Sâr (Pol Pot) came to power with the beginning of Year Zero in Democratic Kampuchea as Pol Pot became "Brother Number One", the country's historical artworks and artifacts had turned the museum into a prison which was planned and erected by Angkar.
