= Moung Ruessei =

- Town
- Location on Cambodia
- Coordinates: 12°46′17.4″N 103°27′2.4″E
- Country: Cambodia
- Province: Battambang Province
- District: Moung Ruessei District

Moung Ruessei is a small town and seat of Moung Ruessei District in Battambang Province, central-western Cambodia. The town is connected to Svay Don Kêv several kilometres to the east via the National Highway 5. Highway 149 connects it to Phumi Sakor in the north.
