= Phare Ponleu Selpak =

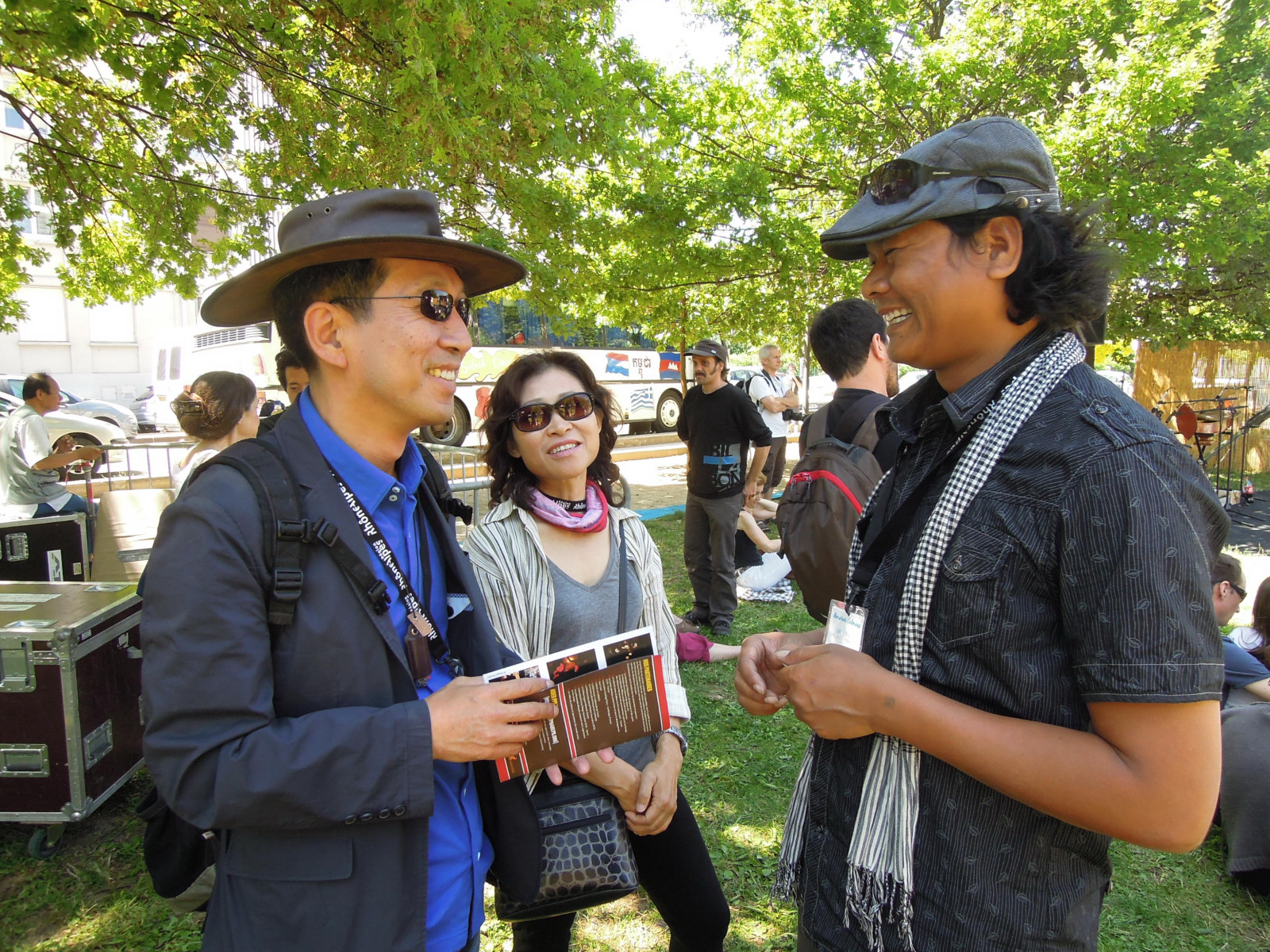
- Festival director Yim Su-taek (left) of Gwacheon and Phare Ponleu Selpak director Khuon Det (right), 2012
- Mission: Help young people to deal with their war trauma by means of art
- Location: Battambang, Cambodia
- Website: http://www.phareps.org/

Phare Ponleu Selpak (PPS, Khmer: ហ្វារពន្លឺសិល្បៈ, literally: "the Brightness of the Arts"), is a non-profit Cambodian association located in Battambang, improving the lives of children, young adults, and their families with art schools, educational programs, and social support since 1994.

Phare Ponleu Selpak offers multidisciplinary schooling to young people, which gives them an opportunity to make a living through art. Those taught typically come from poor backgrounds. The education is focused on self-realization and durability. Classes are given in subjects like theatre, acrobatics, music and a variety of art disciplines. There also exists a school within the campus which provides students training in English, Mathematics and Computer programming. PPS works was founded by Cambodians that had learned in refugee camps that art can be a means to forget trauma.

In the shows, themes are brought up such as genocide and other atrocities. Students of PPS have also acted abroad, like in Bangladesh and Thailand, and in September 2012 with their circus in Germany and Denmark. Annually PPS organizes the international circus festival Tini Tinou.

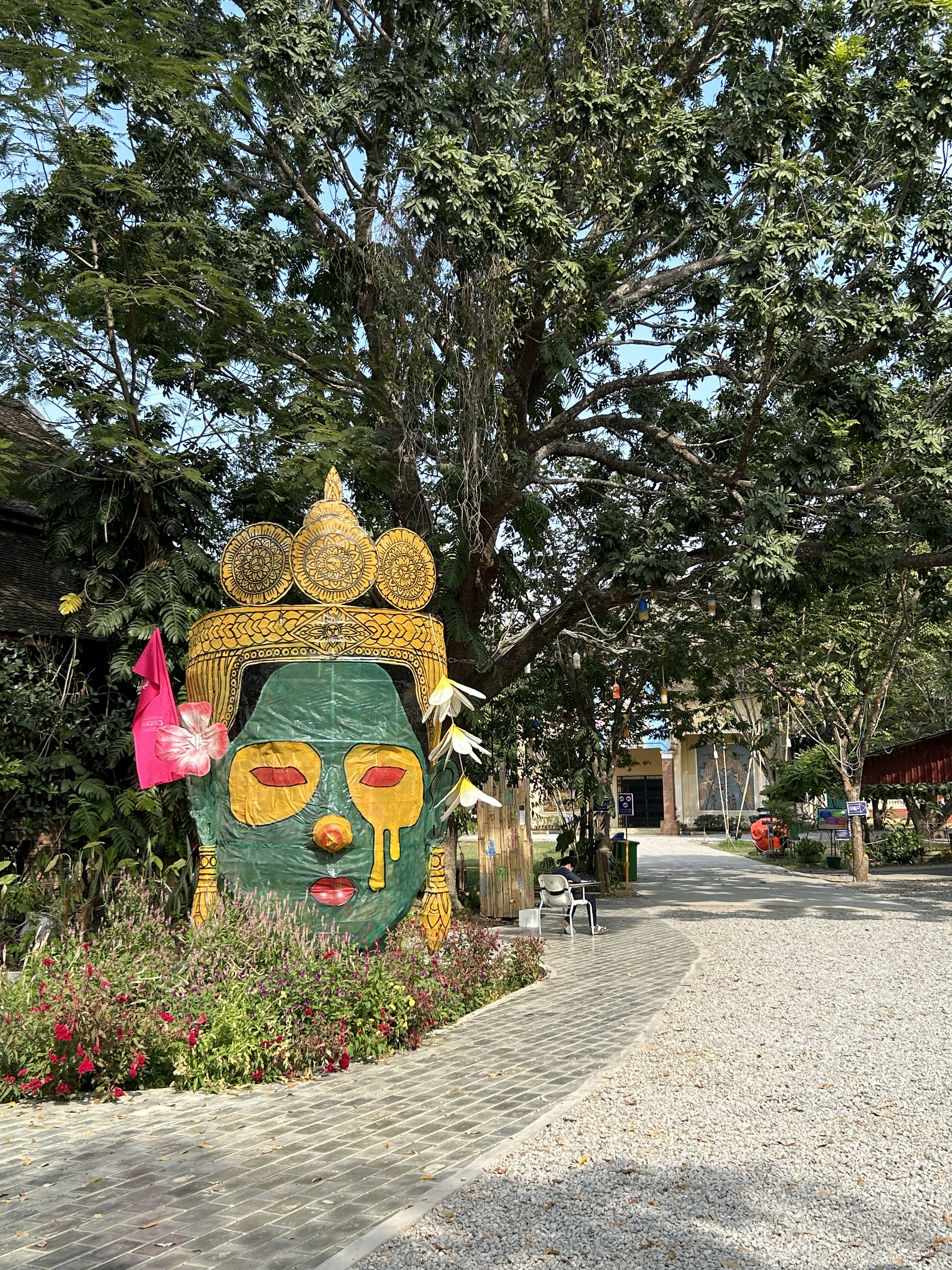
This is what can be seen as one enters the Phare Ponleu Selpak, having vibrant colors and a mask-like sculpture with a green face, golden crown, and bold features, set in a garden with flowers and greenery.

In 2012 Phare Ponleu Selpak was honored with a Prince Claus Award from the Netherlands for its role in the society by means of using culture.

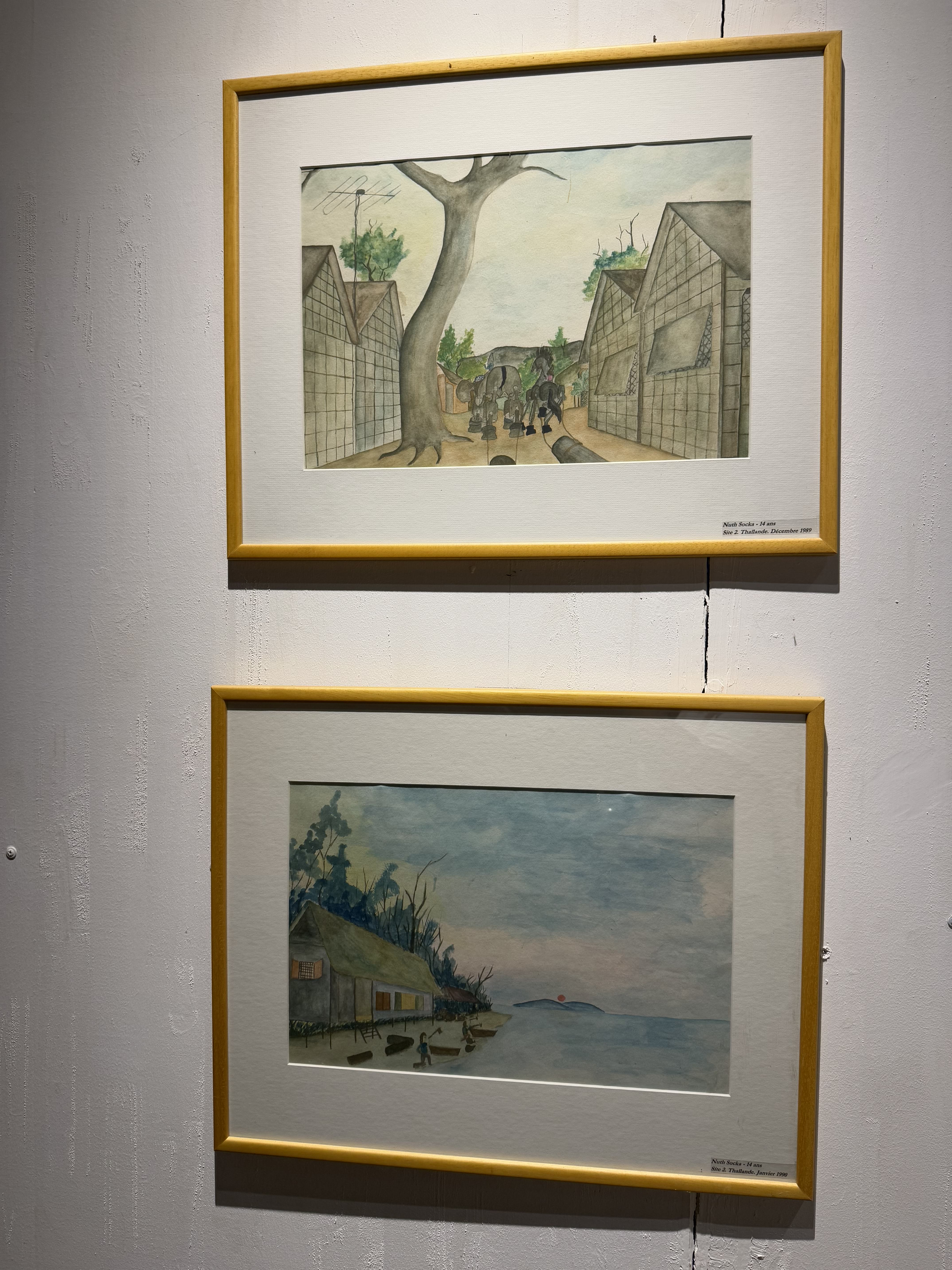
images drawn by children in refugee camps in Thailand displayed in the school's art gallery
