= Traditional Khmer housing =

Housing used by the Khmer people of Cambodia

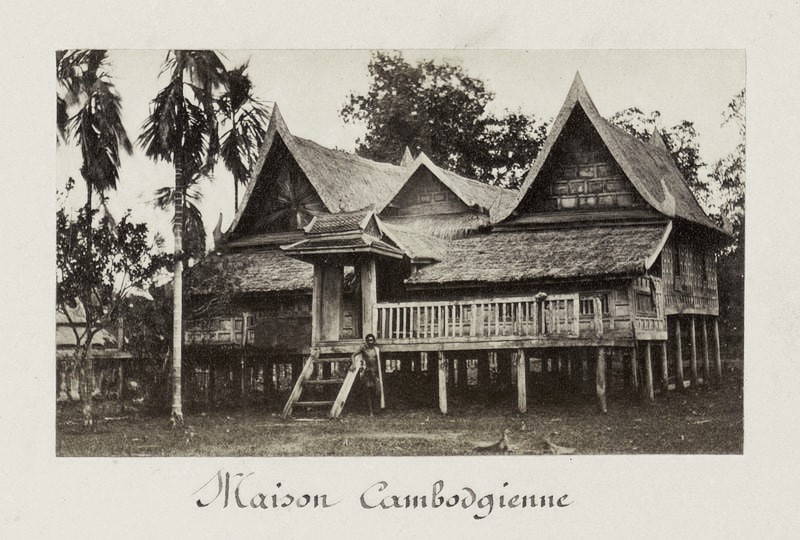
A traditional Khmer house in mid-1800s taken by Emile Gsell.

Traditional Khmer housing refers to the construction and assigned usage of houses or buildings by the Khmer people since the ancient time and evolved until today. In Cambodia, there are many Khmer style houses that are built in different ways depending on hierarchy and purposes. In special terms, the house is a symbol of prosperity in the national society, and it serves the lives of the people in each village, which is culture and nature The Khmer has long been known to traditionally live on different designs of stilt house and also has a multi-leveled floor and gable finials at both ends of the roof ridge.

== History ==
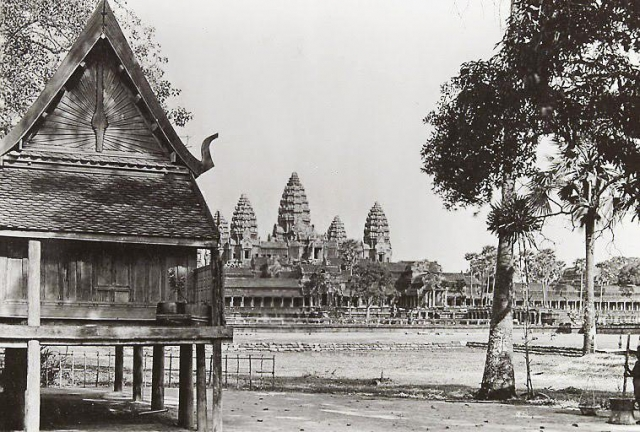
Khmer traditional house in front of Angkor Wat taken between 1919 - 1926.

=== Houses and settlements ===
The earliest record of Cambodian housing is from the Chinese record of Funan kingdom (1st-7th century AD) where the residents were described as people who lived on stilt houses, cultivated rice and sent tributes of gold, silver, ivory and exotic animals. The people built their houses over the ground and made them accessible by ladders as seen across Cambodia today. The Chinese accounts also mentioned the walled towns, dwelling houses and palaces.

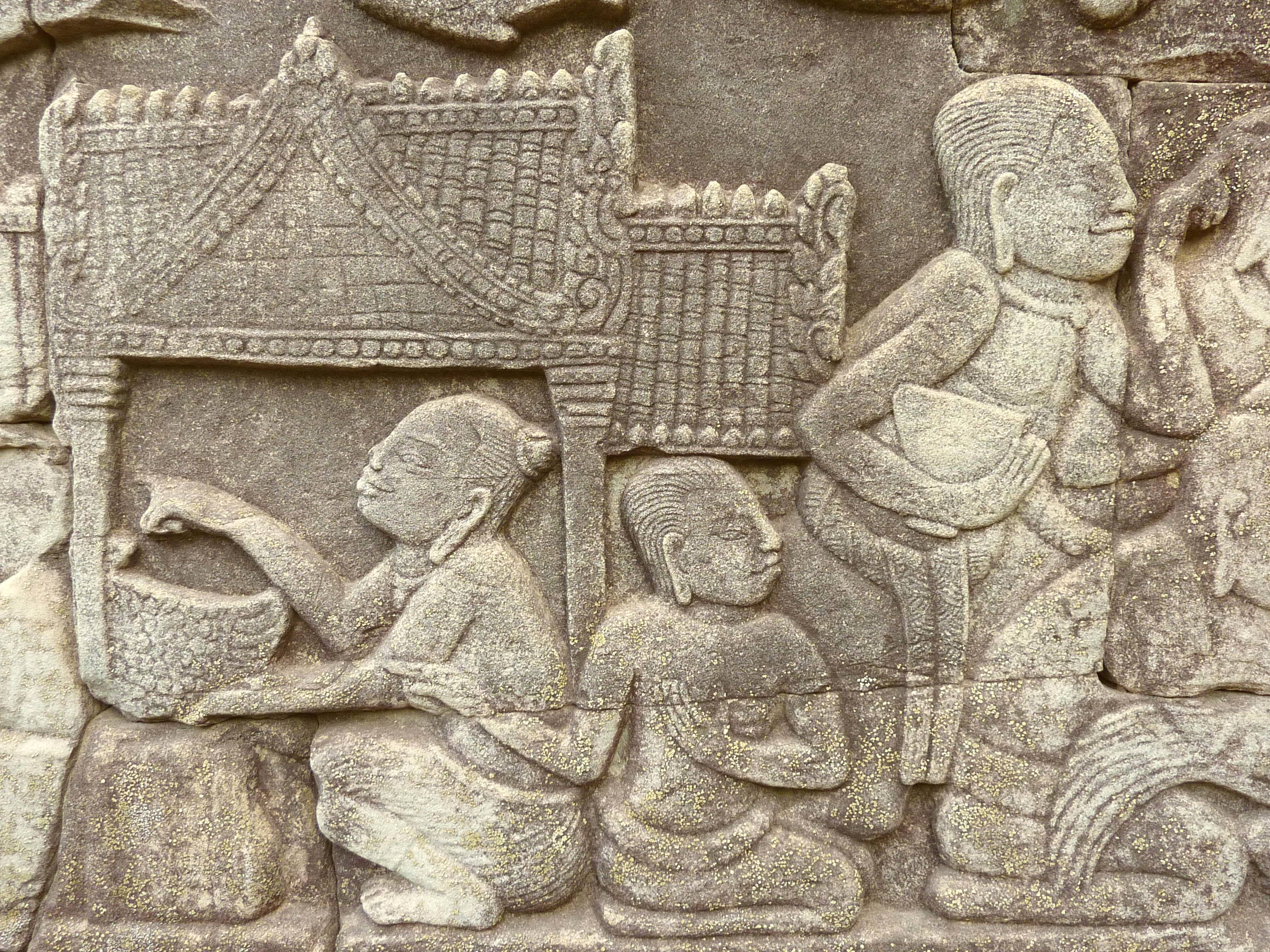
A wooden structure as depicted on 12th century-Bayon temple's bas relief which shared similar triangular roof concept as the roof of today Khmer houses and pagodas.

During the Khmer Empire (8th-15th century), high-status people were known to live in large houses, parts of which were covered in roof tiles where commoners lived in smaller houses with thatched roofs from perishable materials where they were not preserved until today. Additionally, houses were built on stilts so that the living floor was above the ground, according to Zhou Daguan who visited Angkor in 13th century. Bas reliefs from Bayon temple depicted houses, building, and palaces which shared similar roof design and concept with today Khmer traditional houses and palaces.

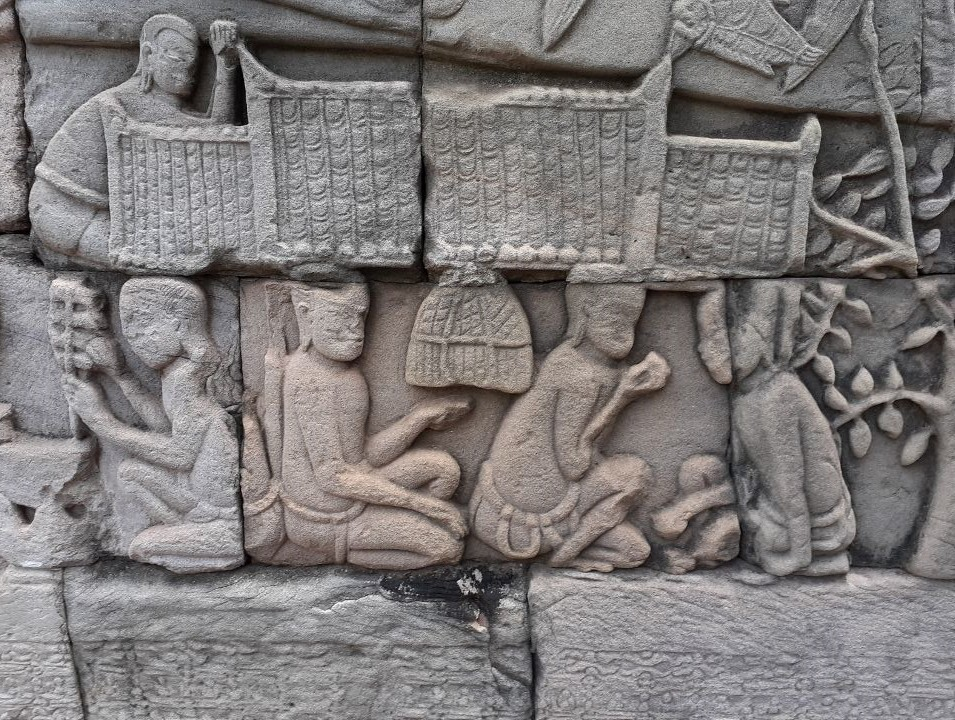
A double-tiered roof of Khmer wooden architecture as depicted at Bayon temple. This roofing concept is commonly seen at today roof design of Khmer pagodas.

=== Royal Residence ===
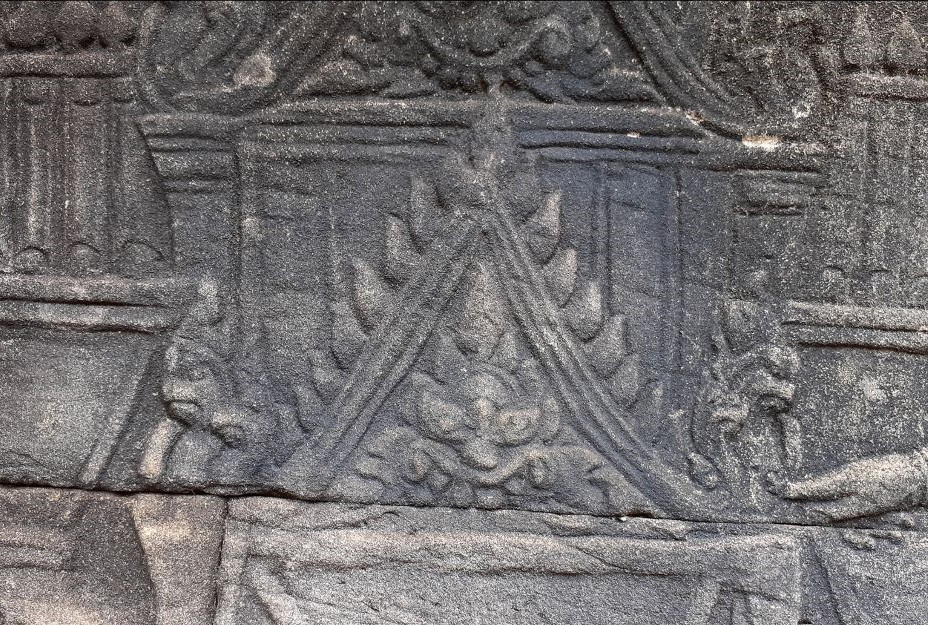
A decorative gabled roof with adorants within the pediment and nagas-finials as depicted on Bayon's bas relief. This triangular gabled roof is almost identical with today Khmer architecture of palaces or pagodas.

As the Khmer temples were usually built from brick, sandstone, and laterite, the royal residences of the Khmer courts were mostly built in wood and from other perishable materials where they are not preserved until the modern time. These brick or stone temples once were surrounded by wooden settlements that perished through times. For instance, the magnificent stone temples at Angkor were the only remains of a vast wooden settlements and palaces at the height of Khmer civilization.

During Funan period, palaces and royal residences were mentioned in Chinese records, however, their actual appearance is unknown. The palace and royal residence of the succeeding Chenla kingdom (6th-9th century) with its centre at Isanapura were also in discussion.

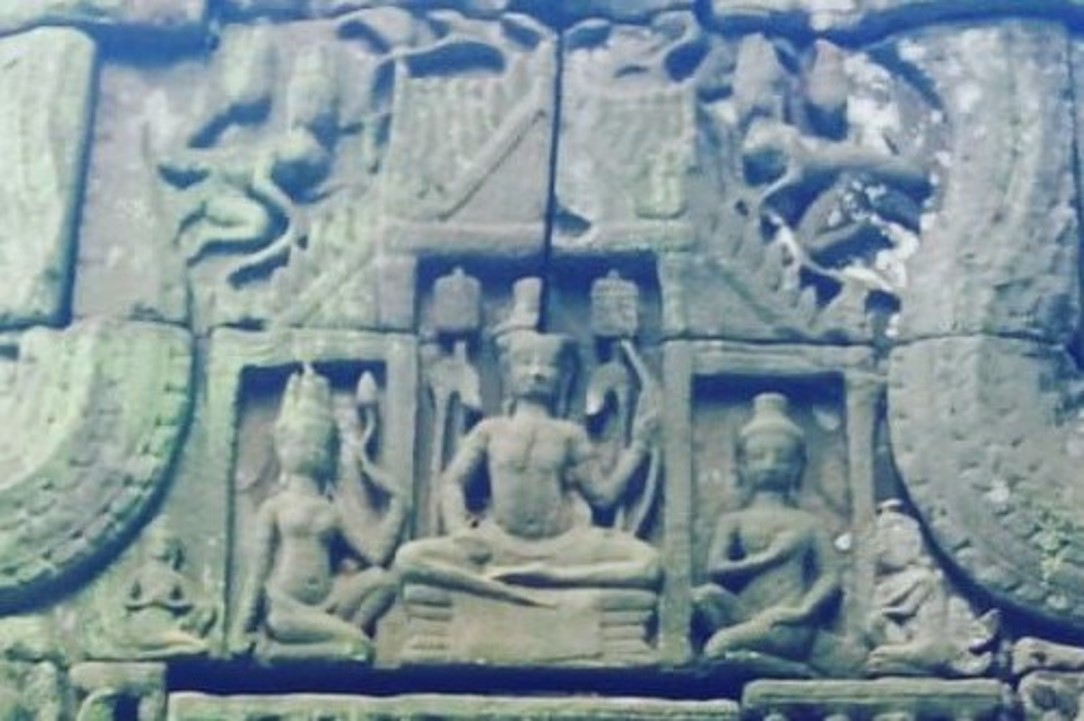
A type of traditional Khmer roofing concept known as somnong muk dach as depicted at an Angkorian temple. This roof design concept is still seen at some traditional Khmer buildings such as the National Museum of Cambodia, the old Royal Throne Hall, and some other pagodas' architecture (Wat Sangkae, destroyed during the Khmer Rouge).

In Angkorian period, palaces were built in various locations such as on Kulen mountain (Mahendrapavarta), Hariharalaya, Koh Ker (Lingapura), and Angkor (Yasodharapura). Palace and royal residences at Angkor were undoubtedly one of the largest wooden structures in the capital and none of the structures survived today. However, Chinese emissary to Angkor in 13th century described the palace as a series of commanding buildings covered with lead tiled roofs. Bas reliefs at Bayon and Banteay Chhmar also depicted several wooden buildings with triangular pediments and roofs considered as the royal halls of Angkorian palaces

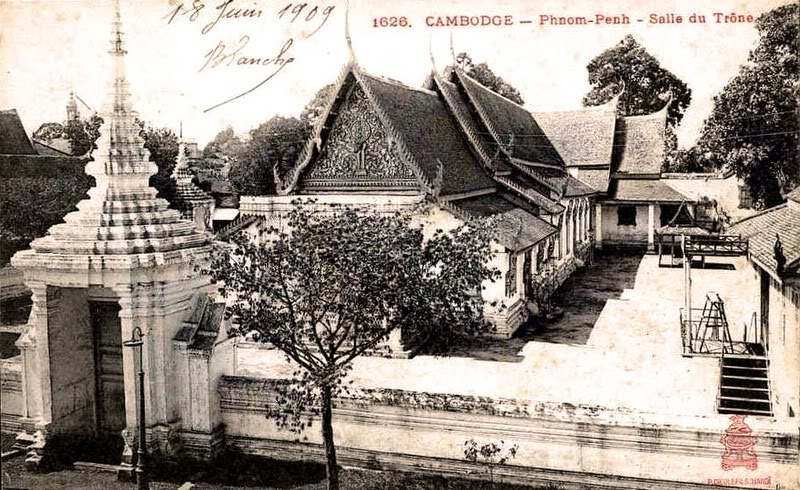
An original Throne Hall of Cambodian Royal Palace built between 1866-1870. It was demolished in 1915 and replaced with a new Throne Hall inaugurated in 1919 and remained there until today.

Zhuo Daguan who visited Angkor in 13th century described the palace walls and audience hall as:

‘The royal palace, officials’ residences, and great houses all face east. The palace… is about five or six li in circumference. The tiles of the main building are made of lead; all the other tiles are made of yellow clay. The beams and pillars are huge, and are all carved and painted with images of the Buddha. The rooms are really quite grand looking, and the long corridors and complicated walkways, the soaring structures that rise and fall, all give a considerable sense of size. In the place for doing official business there is a gold window, with rectangular pillars to the left and right of the crosspieces… I have heard that there are many wonderful places in the inner palace, but it is very strictly out of bounds and I could not get to see them.’

Moreover, French Archaeologist Bernard-Philippe Groslier who conducted excavations at Angkorian Palace enclosure in the 1950s and 60s provides another useful description:

‘…in former days Angkor was a sea of roofs. In the centre of the city sparkled the green and gold tiles of the royal palace, rising above its plain surrounding wall of red laterite. The general plan of the palace buildings resembles that of the flat temples: a series of main buildings intersecting at right angles and marking off various courtyards and quarters according to their respective functions – reception rooms, private apartments, gynecology and offices. The state rooms must have been magnificent: steep roofs carved and gilded arched roof-trees, and walls of precious woods…the audience hall…was supported by pillars resting on consoles…At the end of the hall was the elevated window where the king sat…This was the only part of the building open to the public.’

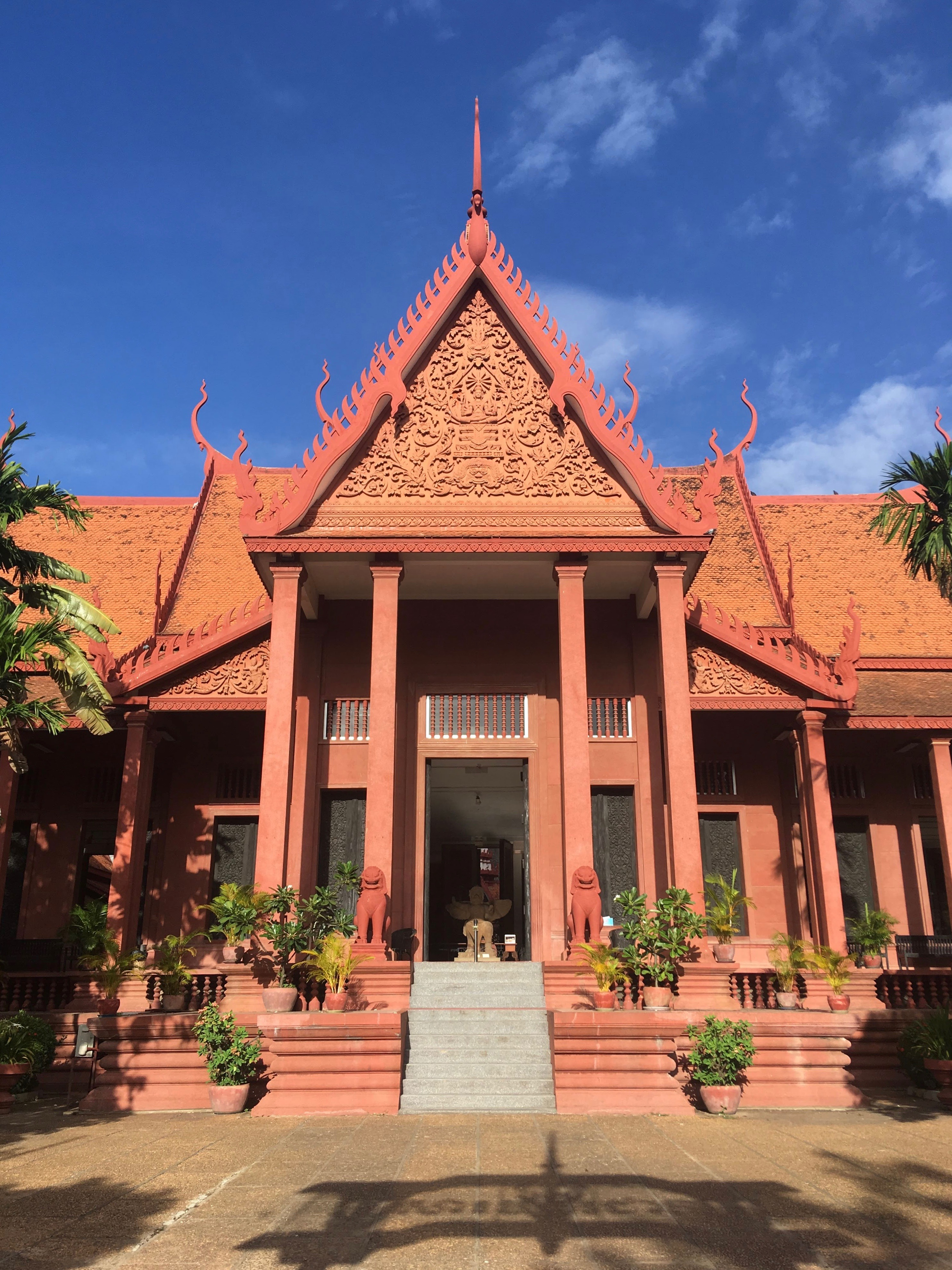
National museum of Cambodia built in traditional Khmer architecture.

As Angkorian palace and royal residences were all wooden and the bas reliefs do not depicted the entirety of the royal residence compound, there are several alternative sources of comparison to reconstruct the appearance of the palace. Another suitable reference for the wooden royal palace of Angkor is the National museum of Cambodia in which it was modelled on traditional Khmer architecture that include wide range of Khmer decorative elements.

== Buddhist Monk's Residence ==
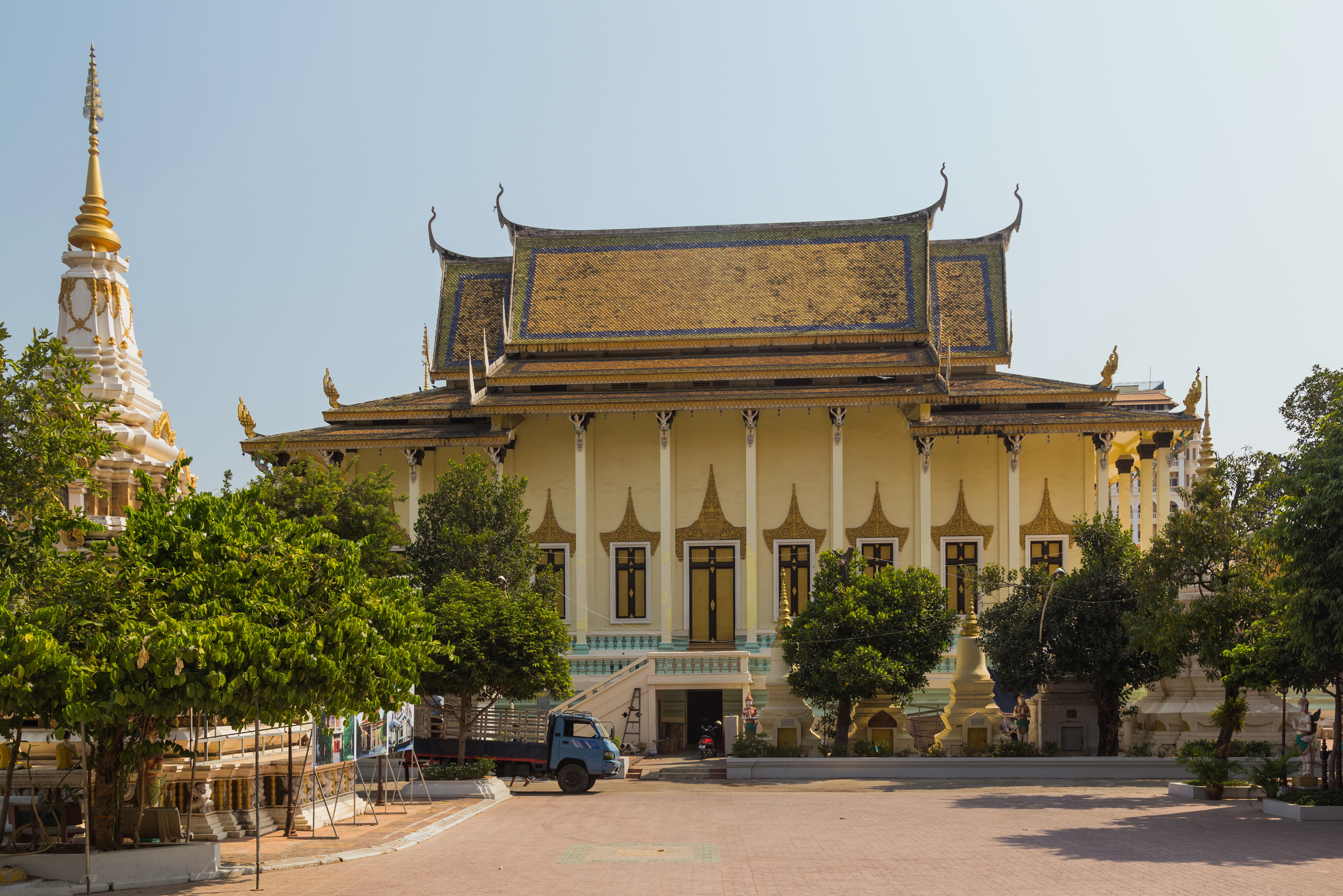
The roof of Wat Botum shares the same roofing concept as seen on Khmer wooden architecture depicted at Bayon temple.

Khmer pagoda and the Buddhist monks' residences in Cambodia all bears its origin from Angkorian wooden architecture as depicted on Angkorian bas reliefs. The residences of the Buddhist monks such as kut and sala chhann share similarity with traditional Khmer houses and sometimes resemble traditional Khmer houses, however they are more decorated with religious elements and design.

== Type of Khmer House for Ordinary People ==
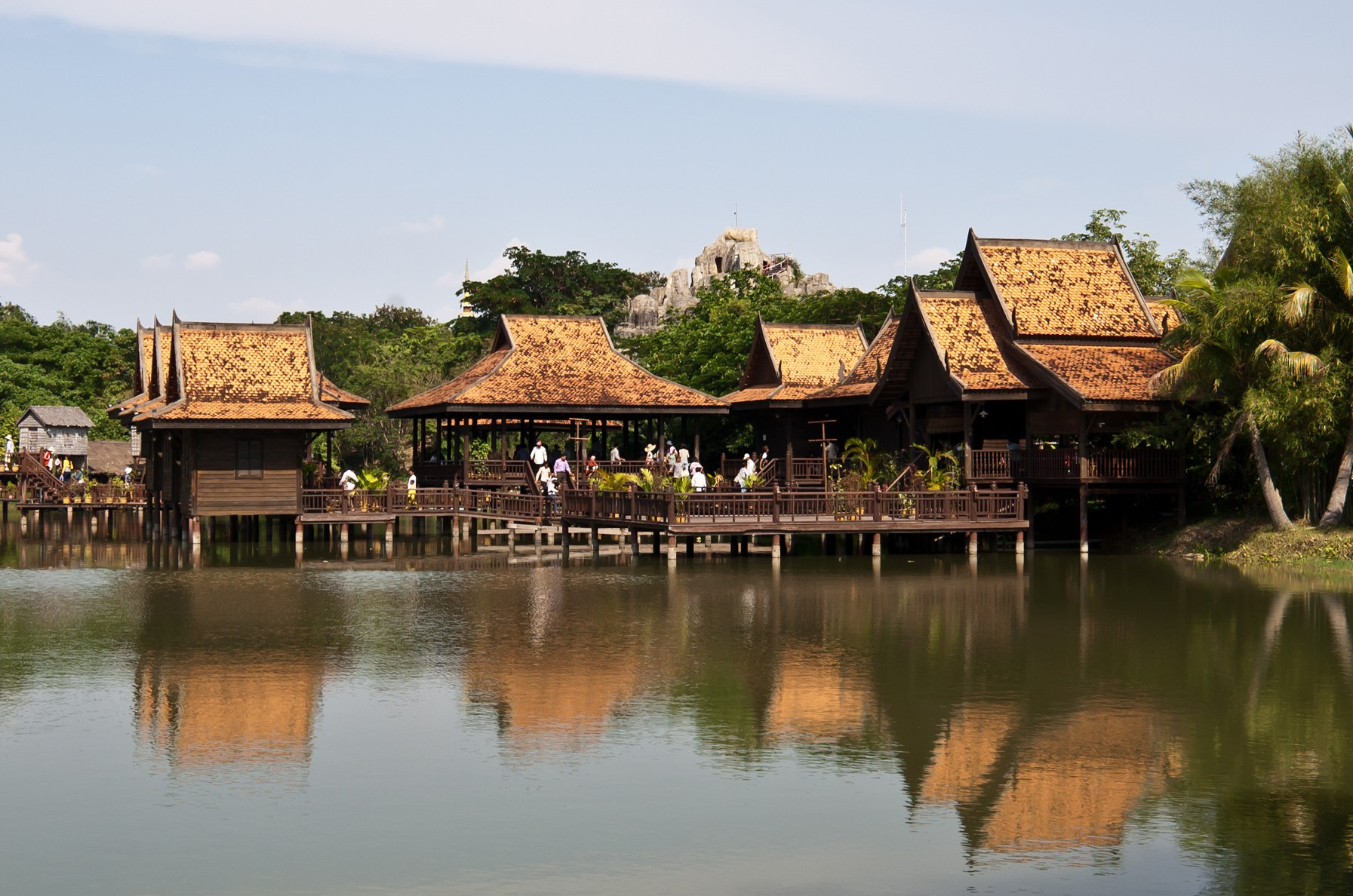
A compound of traditional Khmer house constructed along and over the pond resembling elite house in Cambodian Cultural Village, Siem Reap.

Khmer people construct their house differently based on their social status, wealth, preference, and geographical location. However, what they shares in common is they are usually built as a stilt house where houses are raised on stilts over the surface of the soil or a body of water to prevent flooding. Floating houses were also built around the great lake region of Tonle Sap.

=== Pteas Pit ===
Pteas Pit house is called "Pteas Jorm" or " Pteas Krorjorm" depended on location. This type of house is the structure of the roof, how it is made or how it looks. Pteas Jorm's roof has 4 small roofs combined. This is a normal Pet house. Usually, if look at the layout of the house we can see that the door is only in the middle of the wall which is the biggest size. This type of house we can expand to many shapes by adding the roof. This is a Pteas Pit house which is 2 houses combined. Pteas Pit house can expand from 2 to 5 houses combined. Moreover, in combining we can connect it from front to behind, left to right or right to left, it looks like a twin house if 2 houses combined. Normally, the pattern on the ridge and the top is called " Meat " (Not sure this is correct because it is not included in the Cheonan Dictionary), as shown . In the end, there is a "creek" or some locals call "chicken tail". This type of houses were popular during France colony. Initially, the King Sisowath ruled people wanting to build a house with small roof. Second, the civilization of Monivong Row, one row of three rows is the largest called "mea dombou row. It was built in the middle of the house. Third, in the third reign, King Norodom Sihanouk, Vannavann Khmer was popular in most part of Phnom Penh, most houses in the Kingdom of Cambodia, while Thoranouk Chhouk and Duong were not very constructive. Houses and workshops were only home.

=== Pteas Rongdorl ===
The curtain is in the home of the "Rong". Basically, the crown is built using three rows of columns. The highest central rows are called some other rostrum pillars, called the piers. These middle column pins are larger than the side columns, with the rostrum function. In addition, it is often seen that the middle column pillar is the most luxurious. If the house has four columns of pillars, there are two rows of pillar lint between the columns. the right pillar. Sometimes we do not mind that your home is almost like a collapse of others, and there are also roof shapes. If the house is evaporated and the face is gone. What others (for example, towel, etc.). Basically, refers to a basic unit or structure, and in fact, any type of home is usually organized differently depending on the role or need. In the cinemas, there is a "space coffin" that can be used for various festivals. The "night room" is the pavilion. Whereas other booths, weddings, etc. The basic unit or structure can be expanded by adding more units or structures. As long as the expansion or expansion follows the traditional form, the main temple remains as same castle. The base courtyard with attached kitchen becomes a twin townhouse and a back porch. Various shadows in paintings by pagodas. In the reign of King Sreyrimey.

=== Pteas Rongdeung ===
The house is constructed with a big roof and a pedestal near the front and rear before the reign of King Suriname and during the reign of King Ponhea Khemara. Observations coming to name the different types of Khmer houses are usually determined by the roof. The two-story home overlaid with two roofs in front and back. The central pillars have two rows of rooftop roofs. The substratum can form a corridor if it is covered by the second column. The corrugated plate on the corridor can be lowered slightly lower than the width of the house. At times, the door is made to four directions in all directions, and stairs at any door, whether the width or the length of the house are demanded. For example, the stairs are usually at the center of the house, but at times, such as wedding marriages, the children move the stairs to the side not far from the ceremony. It is said that in the past, it was often the home of the wounded or the mosque of the chief of the temple. It is believed that this type of house was a big house in Battambang of the time of the Lord. The design of the house is architectural. But if you look at ancient artifacts in the pagoda, it cannot be so. Maybe it's a house you're drowning or you've got a property, but it's a simple home, a wall, and a rooftop. During the Monarchy from 1794 to 1907.

=== Pteas Kontaing ===
The simplest PteasKontang's roof is generally triangular portion of roof pitches facing each other. The pillar has at least three rows at least. The center row is the highest called a rope, pillar or pillar. other rows called "veang row". Normally, the veang rows are at the corner of the house. The front door is always on the top of the stairs. This type of home pattern has existed for a long time, as we can see on various carvings, such as in Bayon Temple. This type of house, compared to the Rong Dorl house, Pit house, is the easiest constructed. While looking outdoors seem simple, in fact, they have various ways of organizing indoor for fulfill Cambodian favorite style , for example, below the roof they liked to build a shelf so they can be used it for store other things. This type of home is much more prevalent, especially in Kampong Cham province. This type of house can be a large house by combined 4 or 5 houses together. In addition, Pteas Kontang may have "wings" from the back of the hut and it commonly called "Swinging Swords", but some locals called "Banok" (meaning bird wing). This wing protects can protect the housefrom little rain. The height of the house is depending on the condition of the land, but if it built directly to the ground, it is called a "Tream". The structure is simpler than other types of houses structure.only having large logs and some simple materials can build the house. Because of its common and beautiful, it's easy to be found in Cambodia especially nowadays . Houses made of leaves can also be called as Pteas Kontang and it's easily to repair .

=== Pteas Khmer ===
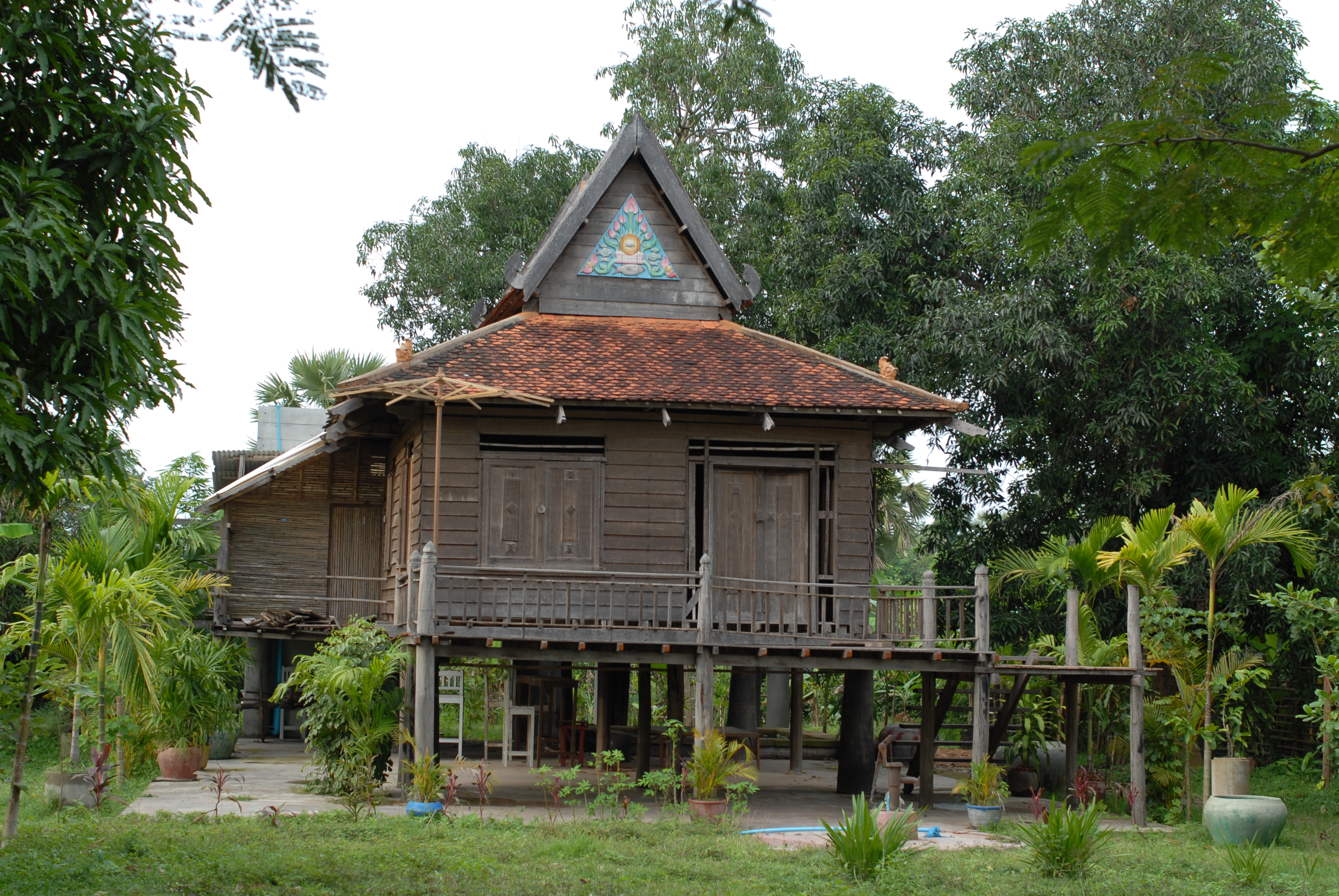
A type of traditional Khmer house known as Pteas Khmer in classification.

Some kinds of Khmer house have a high roof and some don't have like Rongdorl or Rongderg. Pteas Khmer houses have two roofs, making a sloping slope. One single home can be alone, a painting in the early 20th century, or consecutive twin or one row in a row. Also, most of the houses are rented by monks when they see some rows drop down the roof sometimes in front of the side to create the next apartment. To make Khmer houses, they have to have long sticks to be made of piles and rooftops and to use solid wood. So often people have the resources to afford to do Khmer house. We observe that they are doing this home for his or her living in the pagodas or the palace of the royal family, or one of the top officials. The Khmer House looks very stingy on the dance floor, many of them have designer designs, as shown in the picture. During the reign of King Kulondak (Preah Thaong) .

=== Pteas Koeng ===
A type of Cambodian house that was built only for senior officials. The house was marked with two rooftops overlaid with two heads in front and rear. The central pillars have two rows of rooftop roofs. The substratum can form a corridor if it is covered by the second column. The corrugated plate on the corridor can be lowered slightly lower than the width of the house. At times, the door is made to four directions in all directions, and stairs at any door, whether the width or the length of the house, are demanded. This is a lively house built in 1907. From this base, it is further divided into the form.

== Traditional Rest House ==
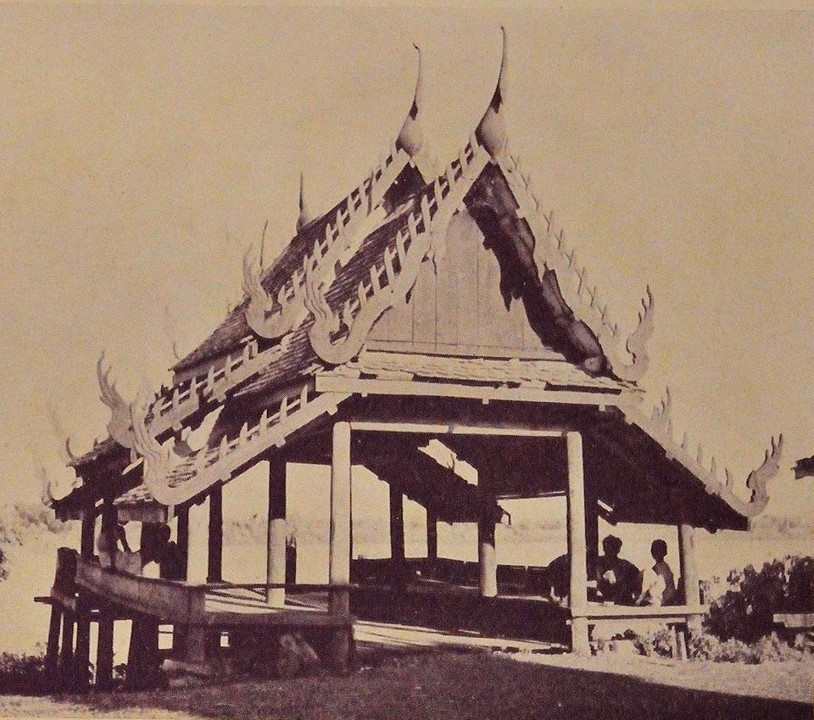
A rest house along a riverside built in traditional Khmer architecture in 1930s.

Construction of rest houses were famous during the reign of Jayavarman VII, the great king of Khmer Empire. During his prosperous reign, Jayavarman VII built 121 "houses with fire" rest houses built every fifteen kilometers along raised highways for travellers, and 102 hospitals throughout his empire connecting Angkor to other Khmer cities such Phimai (present day Thailand), Vat Phu (present day Laos), and Champa (present day Central Vietnam).

This tradition has been practiced until today throughout Cambodia where traditionally wooden houses were built along the roads for the travelers to take a rest or shelter known as sala samnak (Khmer: សាលាសំណាក់).

== Governmental Buildings ==
Although several governmental and public buildings in Cambodia in modern time were built in Western style during French colonial period, however many others were also built in traditional Khmer architecture. Some of them are the National Museum of Cambodia, the Cambodian Supreme Court, the National Assembly of Cambodia, and so on.

== See also ==
- Rural Khmer house
