= Kear (khum) =

Commune in Moung Ruessei District, Battambang Province, Cambodia

Coordinates: 12°46′N 103°27′E

Kear ឃុំគារ
- Commune
- Interactive map of Kear
- Country: Cambodia
- Province: Battambang Province
- District: Moung Ruessei District
- Villages: 11
- Time zone: UTC+07

Kear (Khmer: ឃុំគារ) is a khum (commune) of Moung Ruessei District in Battambang Province in north-western Cambodia.

== Villages ==
- Run
- Roka Chhmoul
- Anlong Sdau
- Pou Muoy
- Pou Pir
- Kear Muoy
- Kear Pir
- Kear Bei
- Ou Kriet
- Ream Kon
- Ta Nak
