= Moung Ruessei district =

Coordinates: 12°46′N 103°27′E

Moung Ruessei district ស្រុកមោងឫស្សី
- District (srok)
- Interactive map of Moung Ruessei district
- Country: Cambodia
- Province: Battambang
- Communes: 9

Population (1998)
  - Total: 134,378
- Time zone: +7

Moung Ruessei (Khmer: ស្រុកមោងឫស្សី, "Mace of Bamboo") is a district (srok) of Battambang province, in north-western Cambodia. The capital lies at the town of Moung Ruessei.

== Administration ==
The district is subdivided into 9 communes (khum).

=== Communes and villages ===
Khum (commune)	Phum (villages)
Moung	Paen, Ou Krabau, Kaoh Char, Ruessei Muoy, Roluos, Ruessei Pir, Kansai Banteay, Ra, Daeum Doung, Moung, Pralay, Ta Tok Muoy, Ta Tok Pir
Kear	Run, Roka Chhmoul, Anlong Sdau, Pou Muoy, Pou Pir, Kear Muoy, Kear Pir, Kear Bei, Ou Kriet, Ream Kon, Ta Nak
Prey Svay	Kor, Cham Ro'a, Thnal Bambaek, Rumchek, Tuol Thnong, Kalaom Phluk, Srama Meas, Prey Svay, Prey Preal
Ruessei Krang	Neak Ta Tvear, Yeun Mean, Tuol Snuol, Chrey Run, Tuol Roka, Nikom Kraom, Srah Chineang, Pech Changvar, Ampil Chhung, Thnal Bat
Chrey	Doun Tri, Angkrong, Tuol Ta Thon, Mreah Prov, Chrey Muoy, Chrey Pir, Chrey Cheung, Chong Chamnay
Ta Loas	Ma Naok, Suosdei, Sdei Stueng, Stueng Thmei, Veal, Voat Chas, Chong Pralay, Pralay Sdau, Tras
Kakaoh	Tuol Prum Muoy, Tuol Prum Pir, Chak Touch, Chak Thum, Kakaoh, Srae Ou, Ph'ieng
Prey Touch	Koun Khlong, Dob Krasang, Thmei, Prey Touch, Prean Nil, Stueng Chak
Robas Mongkol	Boeng Bei, Kuoy Chik Dei, Preaek Am, Koun K'aek Muoy, Koun K'aek Pir, Robas Mongkol, Anlong Koub, Prey Prum Muoy, Prey Prum Pir
