= State Institutions of Cambodia =

This is a list of the state institutions of Cambodia.

== Royalty ==
=== King of Cambodia ===
- Queen Mother Norodom Monineath Sihanouk
- King Norodom Sihamoni
- Norodom Ranariddh

== Legislative branch ==
- Parliament of Cambodia
  - National Assembly of Cambodia
  - Senate of Cambodia

== Executive branch ==
=== Prime Minister of Cambodia ===
- Hun Manet 2023-

=== Office of the Council of Ministers ===
- Khmer Rouge Trial Task Force

=== Ministry of Culture and Fine Arts ===
- APSARA

=== Ministry of Education, Youth and Sport ===
National universities:

- Cambodia Agricultural Research and Development Institute (CARDI)
- Economics and Finance Institute (EFI)
- Institute of Technology of Cambodia (ITC)
- Moharishi Vedic University (MVU)
- National Institute of Education (NIE)
- National Polytechnic Institute of Cambodia (NPIC)
- National University of Management (NUM)
- Prek Leap National School of Agriculture (PNSA)
- Royal University of Agriculture (RUA)
- Royal University of Fine Arts (RUFA)
- Royal University of Law and Economic (RULE)
- Royal University of Phnom Penh (RUPP)
- Svay Rieng University (SRU)
- University of Health Science (UHS)

=== Ministry of Environment ===
- Ministry of Environment, Cambodia

=== Ministry of Finance and Economy ===
- National Bank of Cambodia

=== Ministry of Foreign Affairs and International Cooperation ===
- Permanent Mission of the Kingdom of Cambodia to the United Nations

=== Ministry of Health ===
- National Centre for HIV/AIDS Dermatology and STDs, Cambodia
- National Malaria Center of Cambodia
- National hospitals
  - National Pediatric Hospital, Cambodia

=== Ministry of Information ===
- National Television of Cambodia

=== Ministry of Industry, Mining and Energy ===
- Electricity Authority of Cambodia
- Cambodia National Petroleum Authority

=== Ministry of Land Management, Urban Planning and Construction ===
- Council of Land Policy
- National Cadastral Commission
- National Social Land Concession Committee

=== Ministry of National Defence ===
- Royal Cambodian Armed Forces
  - Royal Cambodian Army
  - Royal Cambodian Navy
  - Royal Cambodian Air Force

=== Ministry of Planning ===
- National Institute of Statistics

=== Ministry of Posts and Telecommunications ===
- Camnet Internet Service
- National Information Communications Technology Development Authority, Cambodia
- Telecom Cambodia

=== Ministry of Public Works and Transport ===
- State Secretariat of Civil Aviation
- State Secretariat of Border Affairs
- Sihanoukville Autonomous Port

=== Ministry of Religions and Cults ===
- Buddhist Institute

=== Ministry of Tourism ===
- Ministry of Tourism

== Judicial branch ==
- Extraordinary Chambers in the Courts of Cambodia
- Supreme Court of Cambodia

== Provincial ==
Please see Provinces of Cambodia, Districts of Cambodia, Commune council.

== See also ==
- Government of Cambodia
- Politics of Cambodia
