= Nida =

Nida or NIDA may refer to:

== People ==
- Nida (name), list of people with the name

== Places ==
- Nida, Lithuania
- Nida, Oklahoma
- Nida, West Virginia
- Nida, Świętokrzyskie Voivodeship, Poland
- Nida Plateau in Greece
- Nida (river) in Poland
- Nida (Roman town), an ancient Roman town in the northwestern suburbs of Frankfurt, Germany

== Other uses ==
- Al Nida (newspaper), a defunct newspaper in Lebanon
- Al-Nida' (Kuwait), Kuwaiti newspaper
- Nida-yi Vatan, Persian weekly newspaper in Qajar Iran
- Nida Civic Movement, a civic movement in Azerbaijan
- NIDA (political party), a political party in the Netherlands
- Nida, a character in the computer game Final Fantasy VIII
- Niddah, the Orthodox Jewish laws of family purity
- Typhoon Nida (disambiguation)
- National Institute of Development Administration, a graduate university in Bangkok, Thailand
- National Institute of Dramatic Art, Sydney, Australia
- National Institute on Drug Abuse, a branch of the National Institutes of Health in the United States
- National Internet Development Agency of Korea
- National Information Communications Technology Development Authority, Cambodia
