= HIV/AIDS in Cambodia =

Despite big declines, the prevalence of HIV/AIDS in Cambodia is among the highest in Asia. Although Cambodia is one of the poorest countries in the world, extensive HIV prevention and control efforts by the Royal Government of Cambodia and its partners have helped to reduce the spread of HIV. Between 2003 and 2005, the estimated HIV prevalence among Cambodian adults aged 15 to 49 declined by 20%, from 2.0% to 1.6%. As of 2019, 0.6% of Cambodian adults currently has the virus.

== Dynamics ==
Cambodia's HIV/AIDS epidemic is spread primarily through heterosexual transmission and revolves largely around the sex trade. HIV transmission occurs mainly in sexual partnerships where one partner has engaged in high-risk behaviors. Women constitute a growing share of people living with HIV/AIDS, comprising an estimated 47 percent of people living with HIV/AIDS in 2003, compared with 37 percent in 1998.

This increased proportion of infections among women may reflect declining prevalence rates among males, as well as deaths among males infected in the early years of Cambodia's epidemic. Significantly, a low prevalence rate in the general population masks far higher prevalence rates in certain sub-populations, such as injecting drug users, people in prostitution, men who have sex with men, karaoke hostesses and beer girls, and mobile and migrant populations.

By 2014, HIV prevalence was reduced to 0.4 percent through a successful prevention program. However, in 2015 a massive outbreak of HIV stemming mostly from Roka occurred. The cause is thought to be the reuse of syringes by an unlicensed doctor operating in the region who has since been jailed.

== History ==
After the first case of HIV was detected in Cambodia in 1991, the prevalence of infection increased steadily to a high of 2 percent in 1998. In the general population, the prevalence declined to 0.5 percent in 2009, down from 1.2 percent in 2001. The prevalence of HIV infection among women visiting antenatal care (ANC) clinics also declined, from a high of 2.1 percent in 1999 to 1.1 percent in 2006.

Among HIV-infected pregnant women, there was also a gradual increase in the percentage who received antiretroviral therapy (ART) to reduce the risk of mother-to-child transmission, from 1.2 percent in 2003 to 11.2 percent in 2007 to 32.3 percent in 2009 and it is still increasing.

== See also ==
- National Centre for HIV/AIDS Dermatology and STDs, Cambodia
- Health in Cambodia
- HACC Cambodia
