= Thong Khon =

Cambodian politician (born 1951)

His Excellency Thong Khon
- ថោង ខុន
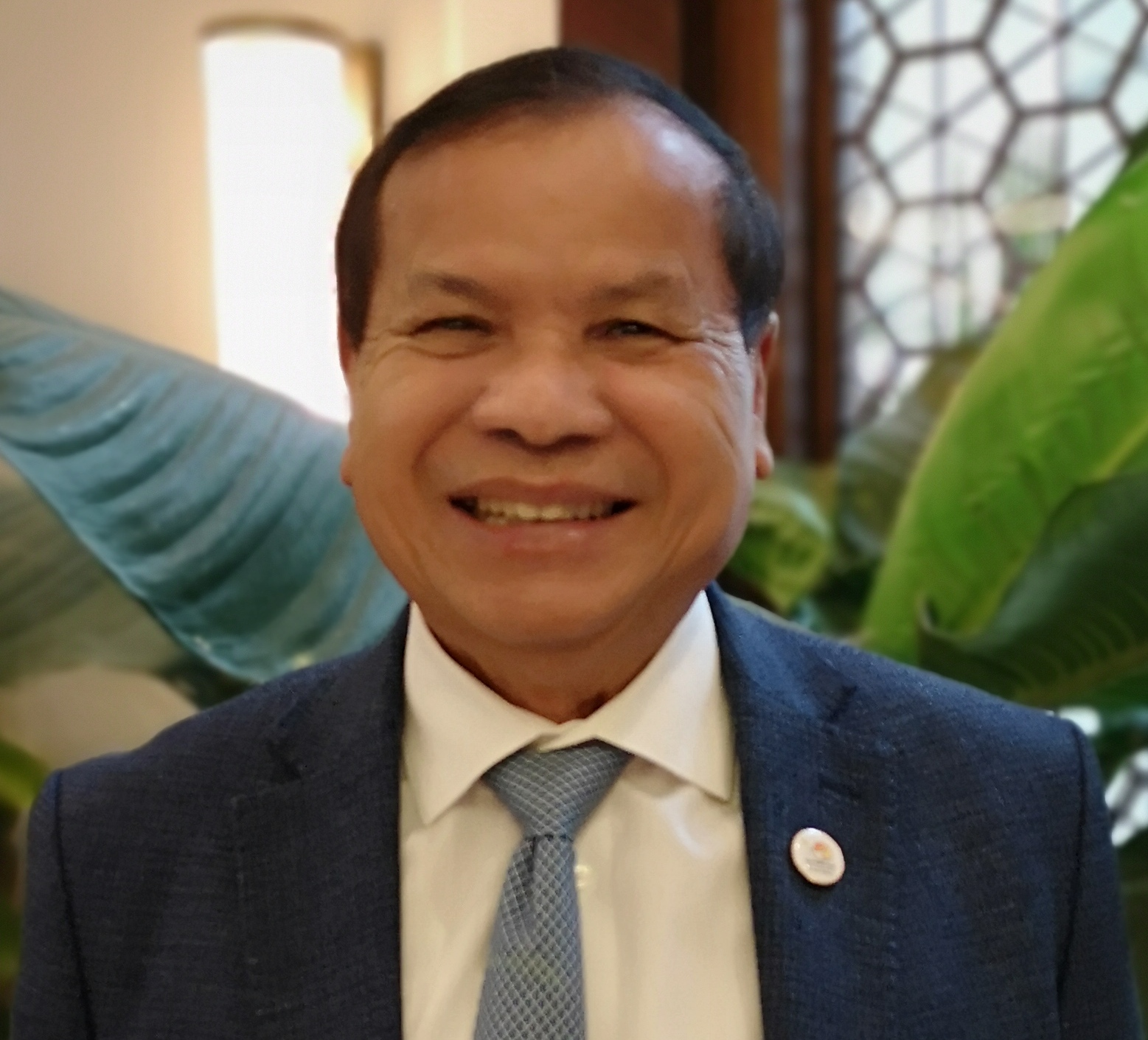
- Khon in 2019

Minister of Tourism
- In office 30 November 1998 – 22 August 2023
- Prime Minister: Hun Sen
- Succeeded by: Sok Soken

Governor of Phnom Penh
- In office 1985–1990
- Preceded by: Keo Chenda
- Succeeded by: Hok Lundy

Personal details
- Born: 23 November 1951 (age 74)
- Party: Cambodian People's Party
- Education: National Economics University (PhD); University of Health Sciences (MD)

Thong Khon (Khmer: ថោង ខុន; born 23 November 1951) is a Cambodian politician. He is a member of the Cambodian People's Party and was elected to represent Kampong Thom Province in the National Assembly in 2003. Thong Khon used to serve the country as Minister of Tourism.

On 22 June 2016, on the rostrum of World Best Tourist Destination award for Cambodia he announced a new tourism policy for the Kingdom targeting 7 million tourists arrivals per year until 2020.

The main features of the Kingdom New Tourism Policy are based on promoting Angkor Wat and Angkor Thom as special cultural destination coupled with promoting the seafront of Cambodia for leisure and sea-related activities.
