= Anlong (disambiguation) =

Anlong is a county of Qianxinan Buyei and Miao Autonomous Prefecture, Guizhou, China.

Anlong may also refer to:

- Anlong (meteorite)

People:

- Mao Anlong (1927-1931), a son of Mao Zedong
- Wang Anlong, Chinese military officer

== See also ==
- Anlong Run a commune of Thma Koul District in Battambang Province, north-western Cambodia
- Anlong Vil, a commune of Sangkae District in Battambang Province, north-western Cambodia
- Anlong Veng District a district in Oddar Meanchey province, Cambodia
