= Central Post Office, Phnom Penh =

Central Post Office
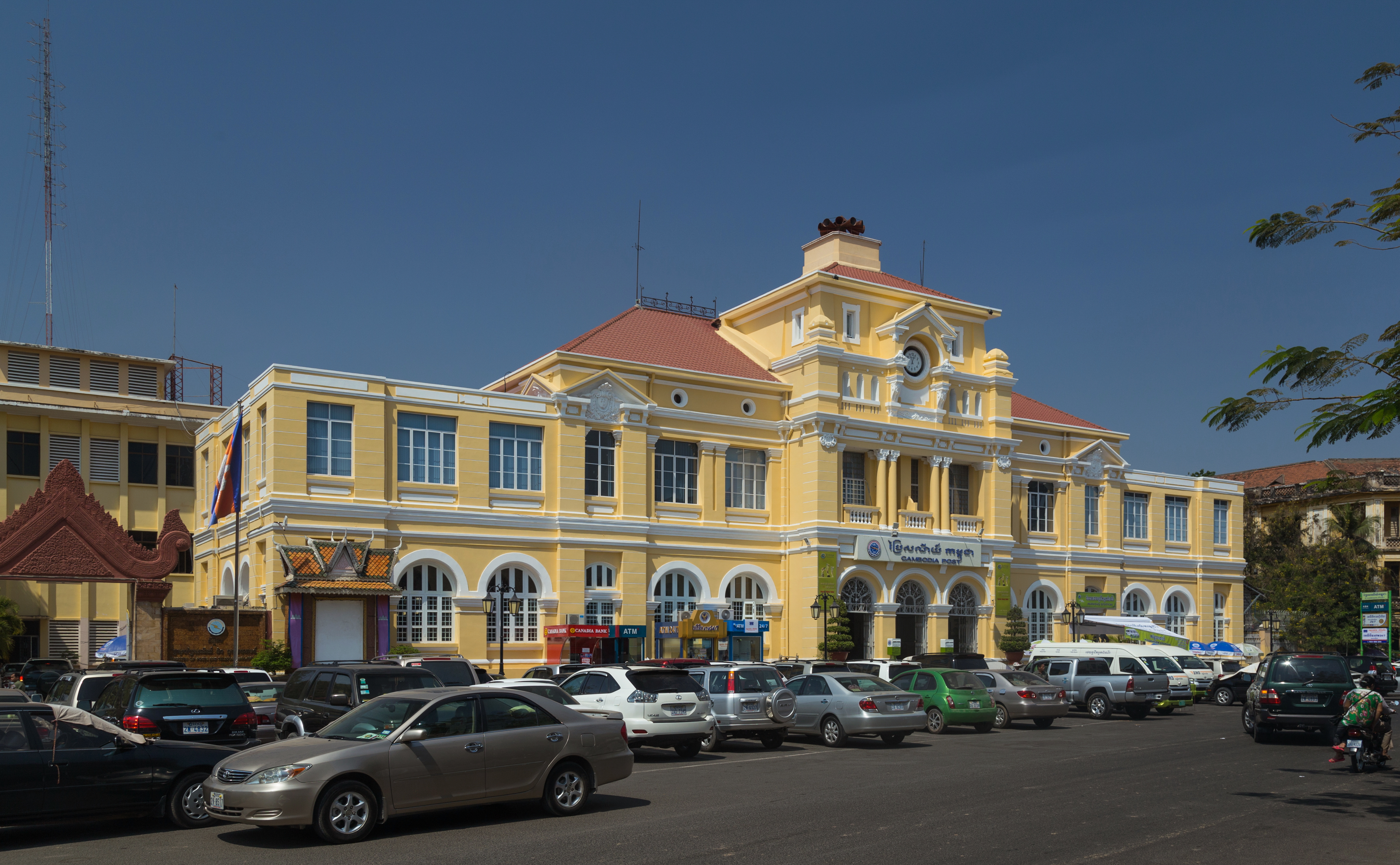
- The building in 2016.
- Interactive map of the Central Post Office area

General information
- Architectural style: neo-classic architecture
- Location: Corner Street 13 & 102, SangKat Wat Phnom, Khan Daun Penh, Phnom Penh, Cambodia
- Current tenants: Cambodia Post
- Opened: 1895
- Renovated: 1940s-1960s, additional floor added in 1991

Technical details
- Floor count: 2

Design and construction
- Architect: Daniel Fabre

The Central Post Office in Phnom Penh, Cambodia is a building erected during the French colonial period, serving as the head office of the Cambodian postal system.

The building opened in 1895, designed by French town planner and architect Daniel Fabre. It was one of several buildings in the French administrative district, all of which were built in a similar style around a central square. The postal administrative building gave its name to the square, the "Place de la Poste".

The Central Post Office features Roman arch windows, columns with Corinthian capitals, balconies with balustrades and columns, pediments and sculpted decorations; the building was designed in the style of neo-classical architecture within a Southeast Asian context. A large garden located in front of the building was replaced in the 1930s with a public square. Wings to the north and south were extended during this same period. During the 1940s, a central squat tower with a cupola roof was removed and replaced by “an eccentric array of loud speakers”. Further modifications to the building took place during the 1950s and 1960s. Finally in 1991, one floor was added onto each wing, constructed in a style similar to that of the original building. Since then, the building has had two stories, with storage on the ground floor and administrative offices for the Cambodian postal service on the upper level. The building gained its final form with restoration completed in 2004. In 2011, the BBC referred to the Post Office "as a yellow-washed beauty surrounded by the finest collection of colonial-era buildings in Phnom Penh."

== Usage of the Building ==
As of 2020, the building is still used as a post office and serves as office space for the Cambodian postal system. The building has been in continual usage since 1895, except for a brief period during the Khmer Rouge regime when the central bank was blown up, money was banned money and the metropolis was vacated of its inhabitants.

== In popular culture ==
The Central Post Office can be seen in the 2002 film City of Ghosts.
