= Calmette Hospital =

- Ministry of Health

Geography
- Location: Monivong Blvd, Phnom Penh, Cambodia
- Coordinates: 11.581318°N 104.915822°E

Organisation
- Type: National, teaching hospital
- Affiliated university: University of Health Sciences

Services
- Emergency department: Yes (24 hours)
- Beds: 250

Links
- Lists: Hospitals in Cambodia
- Other links: Ministry of Health, Health in Cambodia

Calmette Hospital (Khmer: មន្ទីរពេទ្យកាល់ម៉ែត, Móntipêt Kălmêt [mɔn.ˈtiː.pɛːt ˈkal.maet]) or L'hôpital Calmette, located on Monivong Boulevard in Phnom Penh, is a public hospital managed by Ministry of Health and funded by the Cambodian and French governments. It is considered as Cambodia's flagship health care centre. The hospital was named after Albert Calmette, a renowned French bacteriologist.

Calmette Hospital was built in 1950 and received support from several French organizations. In 1998, it was staffed by 30 physicians and surgeons and 50 nurses. There were 250 beds, as well as surgical, medical, gynecology and obstetrics departments, along with a radiology unit (including ultrasound and echocardiogram but no computer tomography), hematology, biochemistry and microbiology laboratories for medical analyses, a central pharmacy and an outpatient clinic. There is also a 10-bed intensive care unit,

It is a fee-for-service hospital that offers a second tier of care for those who are unable to pay. The hospital provides health care services for the citizens of Phnom Penh (73%), surrounding provinces (17%), and to foreigners (10%). Calmette has approximately fifteen thousand in-patients per year of which 20% are emergency visits. Trauma-related injuries accounted for 47% of the emergency visits to Calmette in 2005. It was the most common reason for seeking emergency services in 2006. In addition, cranial trauma was the leading cause of mortality from the emergency department (accounting for 38% of the mortality rate).

== History ==
Before the Khmer Rouge era, what was then the Calmette Foundation Clinic was a private hospital for the wealthy. In 1975, the clinic was closed and educated individuals including those working at Calmette either fled abroad or were executed if they could not pose as being uneducated.

In 1979 after the Vietnamese invasion of Cambodia, Revolution Hospital as it had been renamed had only three doctors out of the only 40 estimated to be left in the entire country. A team of Vietnamese doctors was brought in, soon to be joined by Cubans, East Germans, Russians and Bulgarians. French had been the language of medicine in Cambodia, but soon it became multilingual. and Dr Heng Tay Khy who was named chief of surgery, spoke six languages.

In 1989, Médecins du Monde conducted a study that recommended the hospital be reestablished as a public facility. At the time, it was 90 percent reserved for high-ranking officials and 10 percent for the poor. The French NGO recommended the allocation of resources be reversed. Further, the report recommended massive renovations and reconstruction costing $3 million, and that the name be changed to Calmette Hospital.

These changes, funded by the French government and with donations from a variety of other nations since, including Japan, have given Phnom Penh the well-equipped facility it has today. There are 203 beds, 101 of them medical and 57 for surgical patients. Other beds are in the emergency, anaesthetic recovery, maternity and gynecology areas. A modern laboratory wing performs testing procedures and there are x-ray facilities.

Plans for the future include expansion of the cardiac treatment center, a new facility for the treatment of monks and work on the intensive care and emergency units.

== Governance ==
This hospital has an unusual statute, with managerial autonomy and a system of cost recovery that currently provides 64% of the hospital's income. Since 1994, it has benefited from a French cooperation program. The French NGO, Médecins du Monde, has been present at Calmette since 1990, providing support for "Medicine B", the indigent sector of the medical department in which services provided do not require a charge ("Medicine A" services must be paid for).

== Emergency services ==
Calmette Hospital has two ambulances available to conduct its emergency medical services of which, one ambulance is permanently on the field and is used primarily for blood transfusion services while the other is located at the hospital's emergency entrance on call when needed. A driver, nurse and/or doctor rotate as part of the emergency response teams. Occasionally, a resident may replace the emergency doctor.

About 40% of emergency patients reach the hospital via ambulance. It takes on average four hours to transport a patient to the emergency department. This value takes into account patients being transported from Kandal Province in addition to those from the outskirts of the city. However, many patients simply walk into the emergency department on foot or by the help relatives.

== Issues ==
Calmette's biggest problems involve funding. The facility runs on a budget of approximately US$1 million a year, part of which comes from the Ministry of Health and part from fee-paying patients. The mandate of Calmette is to treat the poor and there is always a shortfall as 50% of patients were from indigent backgrounds in a nation lacking social security provisions. International donors make up the difference and the French government is still a major supporter.

== Diamond Island tragedy ==
In the aftermath of the Diamond Island tragedy, during which 456 people were trampled to death, Calmette Hospital was a key facility in the treatment and identification of victims of the stampede. According to hospital officials, 264 people sought treatment at Calmette Hospital in the wake of the disaster, overwhelming the hospital's facilities.

Victims of the tragedy received free medical treatment after Prime Minister Hun Sen committed the government to pay for treatment of injuries inside Cambodia or overseas if necessary.
