= Norea (commune) =

Coordinates: 13°07′N 103°13′E

Norea ឃុំនរា
- Commune
- Interactive map of Norea
- Country: Cambodia
- Province: Battambang
- District: Sangkae
- Time zone: UTC+7 (ICT)

Norea (Khmer: នរា) is a commune (khum) of Sangkae District in Battambang Province in north-western Cambodia.

== Villages ==
- Norea Muoy
- Norea Pir
- Balat
- Ta Kok
