= Theavy Mok =

Cambodian plastic surgeon

- Born: 3 April 1963 (age 63); Phnom Penh, Cambodia
- Education: University of Health Sciences; Ghent University; University of Southern California
- Occupations: Plastic surgeon, deputy director of Khmer-Soviet Friendship Hospital and a board director of Smile Cambodia

Theavy Mok (Khmer: ម៉ុក ធាវី; born April 3, 1963) is the first plastic surgeon in Cambodia. He received his medical doctorate in 1990 from the University of Health Sciences, Phnom Penh. Since then he has worked in the general surgery department at the Khmer-Soviet Friendship Hospital. Starting in 2002, Theavy has served as medical director of Operation Smile Cambodia. In 2007, Theavy was awarded the Royal Government of Cambodia's Gold Medal of Work for his efforts to develop human resources in Cambodia through teaching. Most recently in 2009 he was awarded the Bronze Medal for his collaborative projects with international NGOs, medical professionals and the Khmer-Soviet Friendship Hospital. Also in 2009, Theavy received the first-ever International Observer Fellowship awarded by the Canadian Society of Plastic Surgeons.

== Career ==
Theavy received his medical doctorate in 1990 from the University of Health Sciences, Phnom Penh. Since then he has worked in the general surgery department at the Khmer-Soviet Friendship Hospital. In 1994 he was among ten doctors chosen for specialized four years of surgical training with Inter-University Ghent-Phnom Penh, which included a one-year fellowship for head and neck and plastic surgery in Ghent, Belgium. In 2009 Theavy was the first recipient of the International Observer Fellowship awarded by the Canadian Society of Plastic Surgeons. He spent four weeks observing pediatric plastic surgery, craniofacial and upper limb trauma, and microsurgery in four Edmonton hospitals.

Theavy has participated in plastic surgery, hand surgery, microsurgery, and laser trainings in Belgium, Australia, the Netherlands, Singapore, Canada, and the United States.

Since 2002, Theavy has served as medical director of Operation Smile Cambodia. As medical director, he works with the Cambodian government and regional hospitals to plan and undertake bi-annual medical mission and education programs. In addition to providing services for thousands of patients, the missions are instrumental in providing valuable training for Cambodian medical professionals. In 2003, Theavy was featured in a documentary produced by USC's Annenberg Center for Communication that chronicled Operation Smile's efforts in Cambodia. On October 1, 2005, he received the Medical Visionary Award for his efforts with Operation Smile Cambodia.

Theavy is committed to education and training of Cambodian medical professionals well beyond his role at Operation Smile Cambodia. He is a professor of surgery at International University and the University of Health Sciences. He has organized numerous surgical trainings at the Khmer-Soviet Friendship Hospital, in collaboration with NGOs and professors of surgery from around the world. These trainings provide Cambodian surgeons and medical staff with invaluable experience as well as foster a spirit of international cooperation. Theavy has presented his work at many scientific conferences.

In recognition of his efforts to build the surgical profession, Theavy was appointed as a committee member of the Cambodian Society of Surgery in 2002. In 2007, Theavy was awarded the Royal Government of Cambodia's Gold Medal of Work for his efforts to develop human resources in Cambodia through teaching. He was awarded the bronze medal in 2009 for his collaborative projects with international NGOs and medical professionals and the Khmer-Soviet Friendship Hospital.

== See also ==
- Operation Smile
- Khmer-Soviet Friendship Hospital
- Plastic Surgeon
