= Mam Bunheng =

Cambodian politician

His Excellency Mam Bunheng
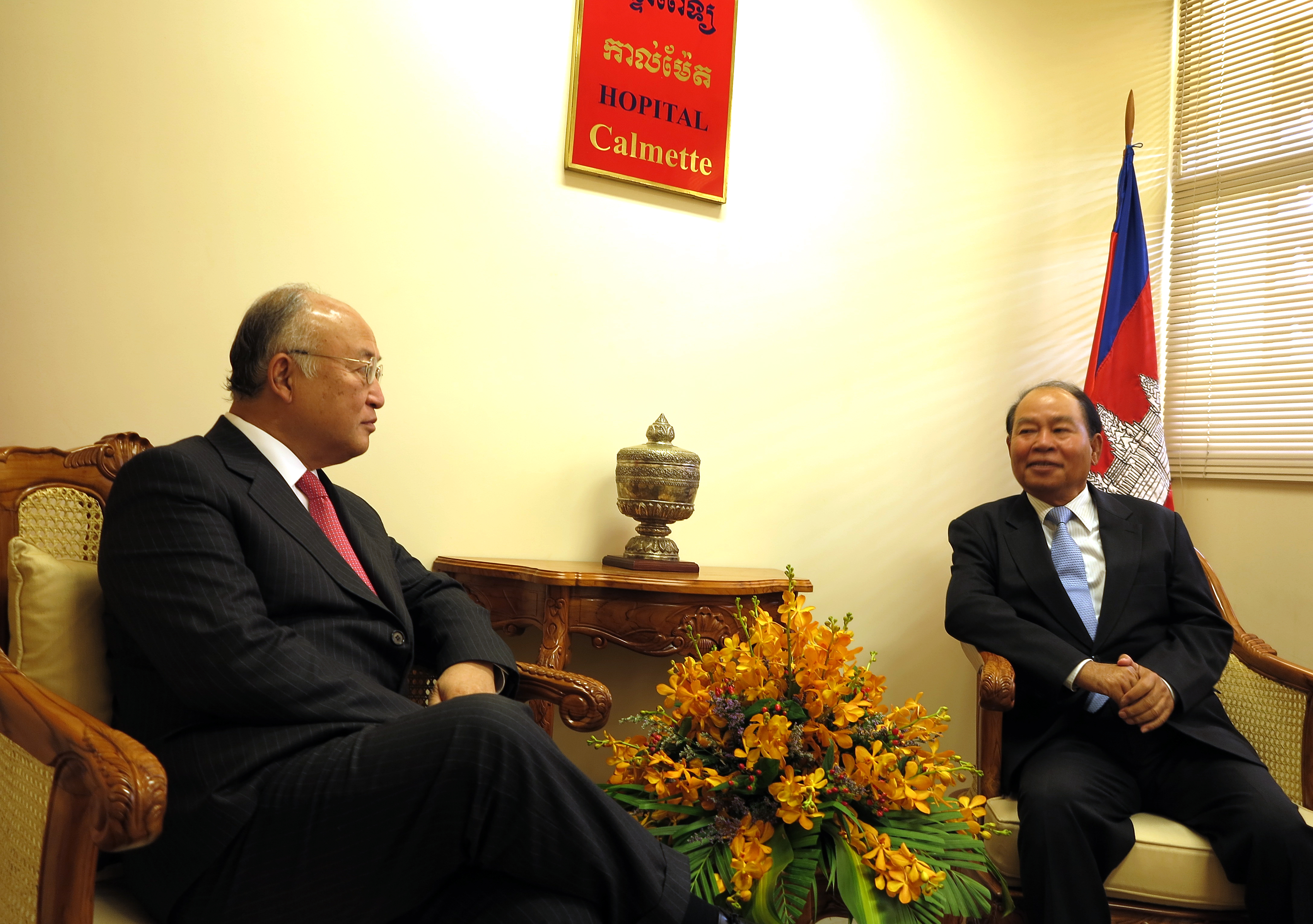
- Bunheng (right) with International Atomic Energy Agency Director-General Yukiya Amano, January 2014

Minister of Health
- In office 25 September 2008 – 22 August 2023
- Prime Minister: Hun Sen
- Succeeded by: Chheang Ra

Personal details
- Born: 13 April 1949 (age 77) Takéo, Cambodia
- Party: Cambodian People's Party
- Education: University of Health Sciences

Mam Bunheng (Khmer: ម៉ម ប៊ុនហេង; born 13 April 1949) is a Cambodian politician currently serving as the Minister of Health since 2008. Bunheng has been prominent in Cambodia's response to the COVID-19 pandemic.

== As health minister ==
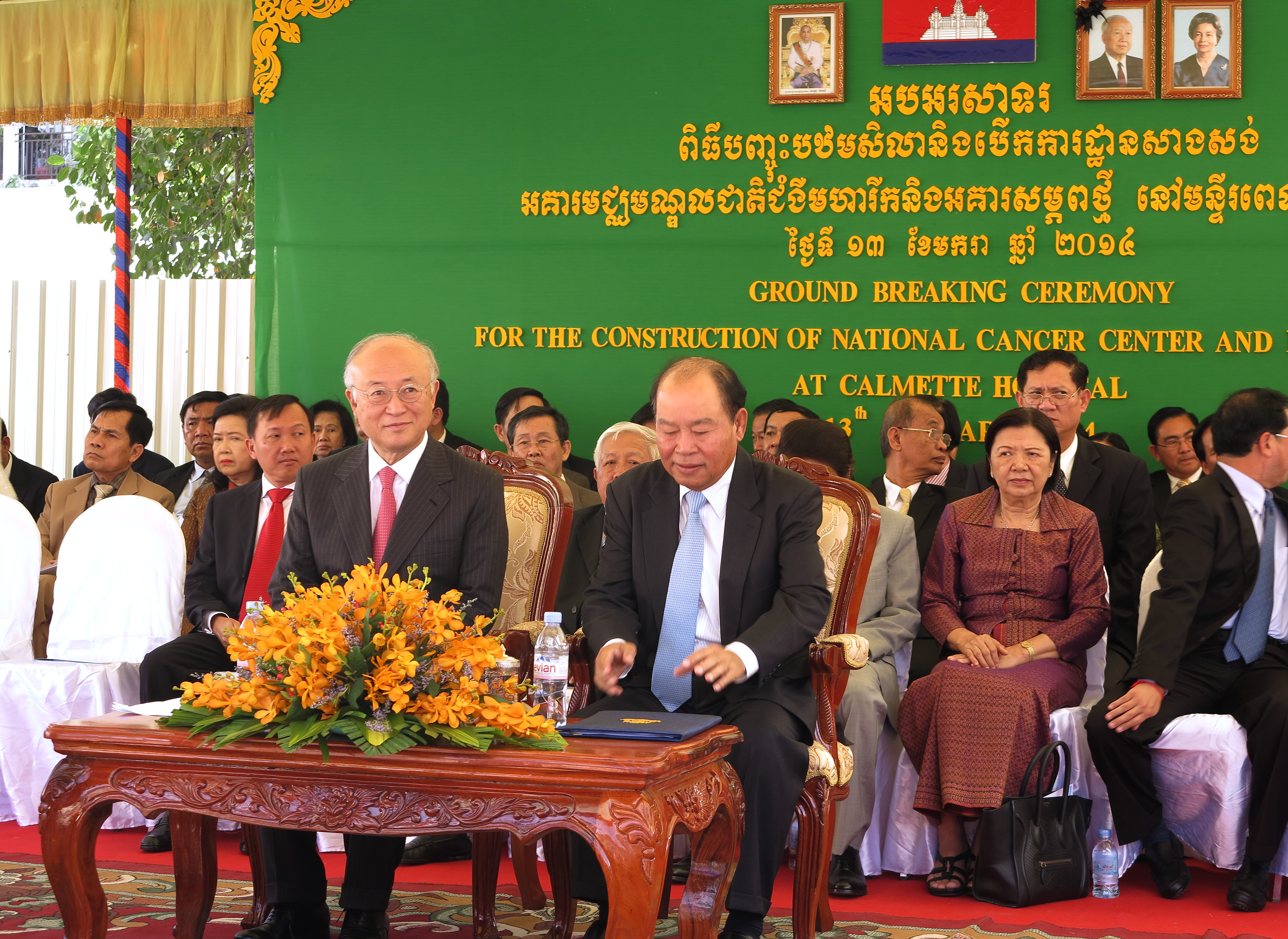
Bunheng (right) with IAEA Director General Yukiya Amano, 2014

During his time as health minister, Bunheng wanted to be known as the "Minister of Midwifery." Since the late 2000s to early 2010s, birth-spacing has improved with more contraception and legal abortions, and some expectant mothers receive vouchers for delivering at health facilities due to government programs. According to the World Bank in 2014, health has not been a priority for the government of Cambodia, with only 6% of funding coming from the national government by 2010. Issues like rent-seeking and poorly qualified staff affected the health sector. In 2008, high food prices significantly increased severe malnutrition rates among children. Despite decline in 2009, there had been no improvement in combatting it. Bunheng stated that tuberculosis is the "bellwether of malnutrition" and admitted that "it is rising."

During the COVID-19 pandemic in Cambodia, Bunheng thanked China for providing medical supplies to the country.
