= Ou Dambang Pir =

Coordinates: 13°03′N 103°14′E

Ou Dambang Muoy ឃុំអូរដំបង ២
- Commune
- Interactive map of Ou Dambang Muoy
- Country: Cambodia
- Province: Battambang Province
- District: Sangkae District
- Villages: 6
- Time zone: UTC+07

Ou Dambang Pir (Khmer: ឃុំអូរដំបង ២ is a khum (commune) of Sangkae District in Battambang Province in north-western Cambodia.

== Villages ==
- Ou Dambang
- Svay Chrum
- Kampong Mdaok
- Svay Thum
- Dambouk Khpos
- Tuol Lvieng
