= Khmer–Soviet Friendship Hospital =

- Ministry of Health
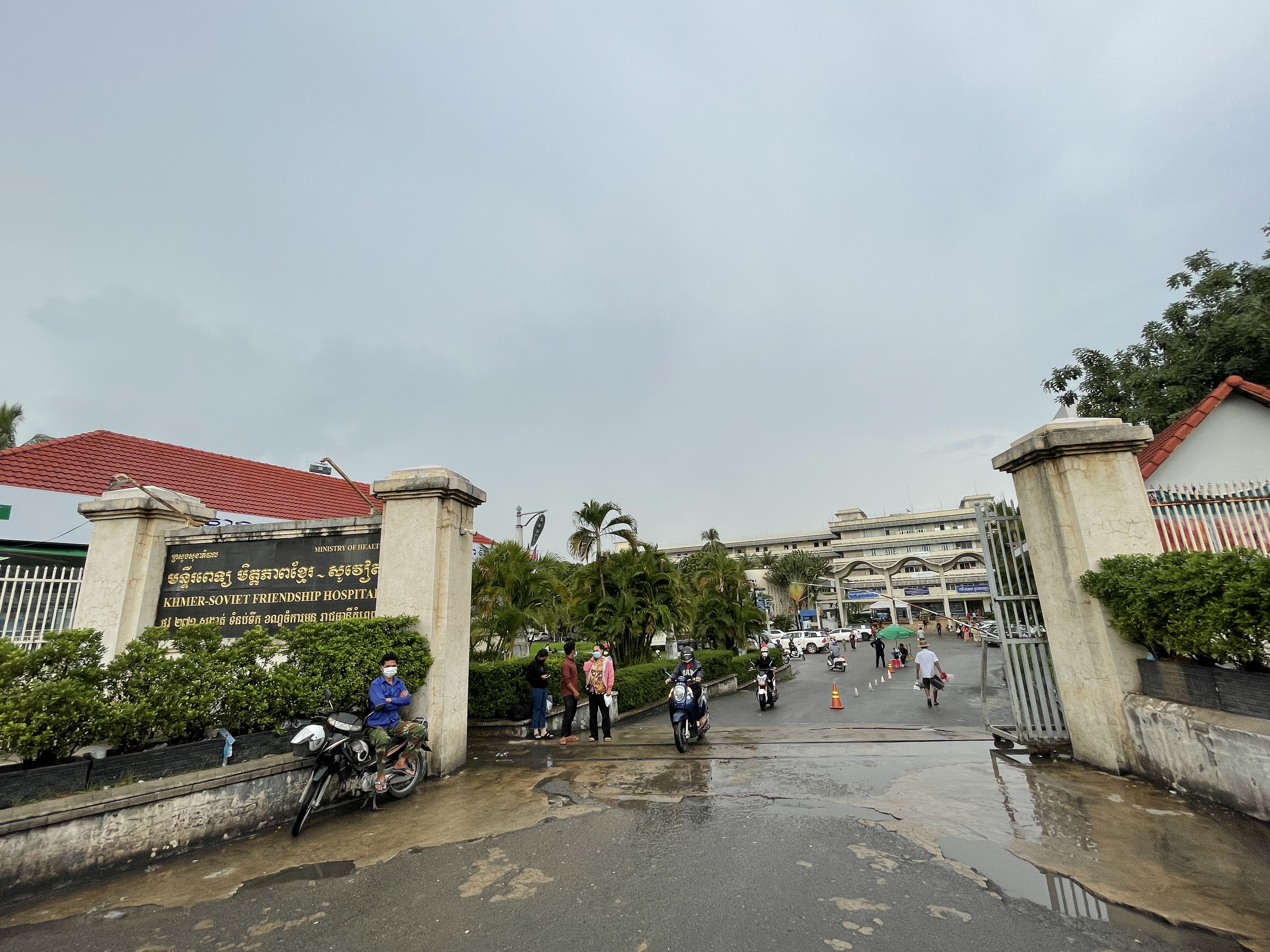
- Front View of the Hospital

Geography
- Location: Youtheapol Khemarak Phumin Blvd (271), Phnom Penh 12306
- Coordinates: 11.544837°N 104.904022°E

History
- Former name: Preah Sihanouk Hospital

Links
- Website: www.khmersoviethospital.org.kh

The Khmer–Soviet Friendship Hospital (KSFH; Khmer: មន្ទីរពេទ្យមិត្តភាពខ្មែរ-សូវៀត, Môntirpéty Mĭttâphéap Khmêr-Soviĕt) is a public hospital located in Phnom Penh, capital of Cambodia. The hospital is currently managed by the Ministry of Health and it was opened in 1960.

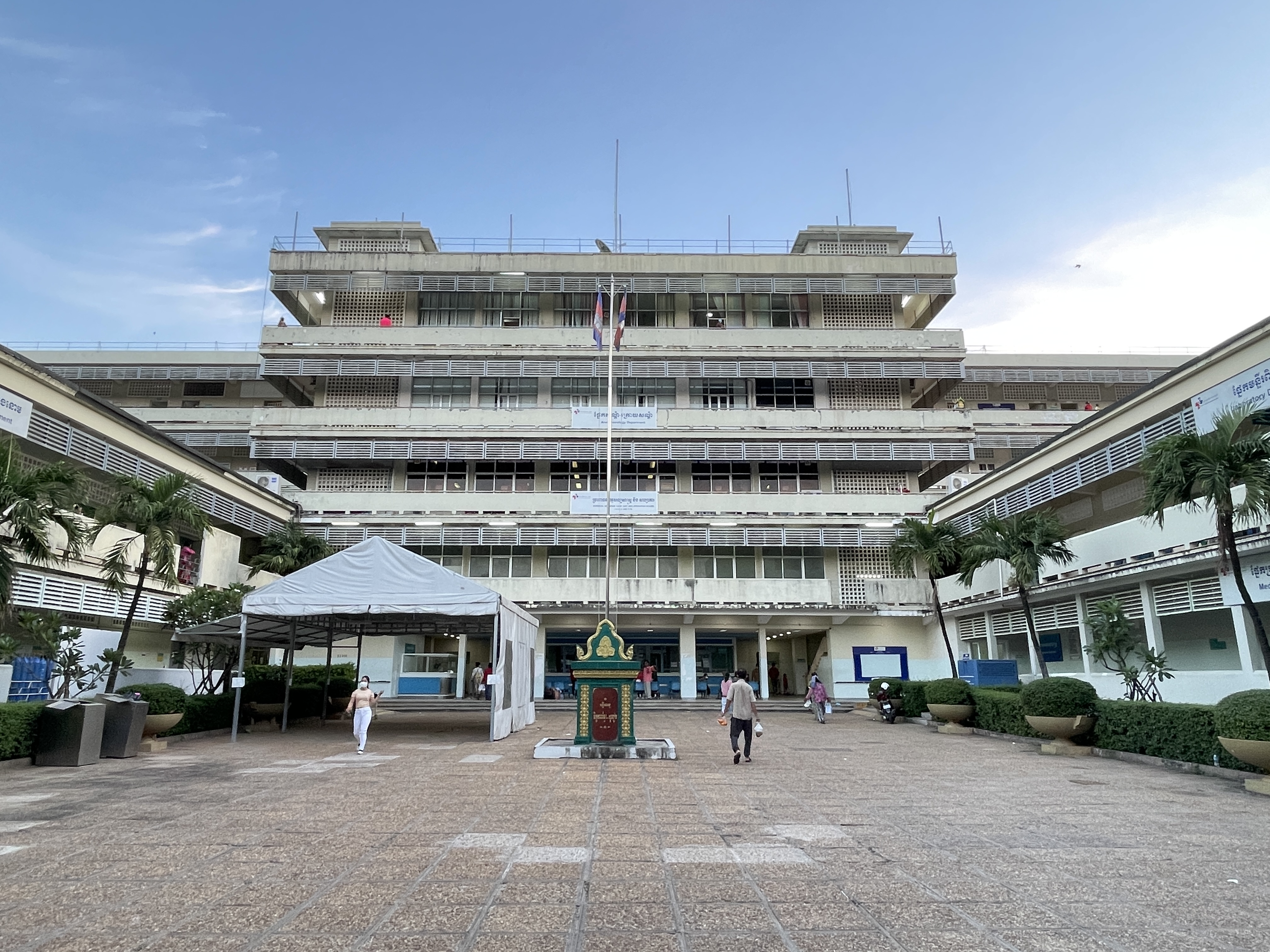
Khmer–Soviet Friendship Hospital

== Notable people ==
Theavy Mok - surgeon.

== See also ==
- Ministry of Health (Cambodia)
- Health in Cambodia
