= National Centre for HIV/AIDS Dermatology and STDs, Cambodia =

The National Centre for HIV/AIDS Dermatology and STDs (NCHADS) is a government agency of Cambodia under the direction of the Ministry of Health. The agency is devoted to managing the treatment and prophylaxis of HIV and STDs. NCHADS' main offices are located in Phnom Penh.

== Sites ==
- National Center for HIV/AIDS, Dermatology and STD
- National Dermatology and STD Clinic
- OI-ART
- Voluntary Confidential Counseling and Testing (VCCT) - 217 sites throughout the country
- Family Health Clinic (STI Clinic)
- Home Base Care
- Social Health Clinic

== See also ==
- Dermatology
- Government of Cambodia
- Health in Cambodia
- HIV/AIDS in Cambodia
- Ministry of Health, Cambodia
