= Majlis (magazine) =

1906 Persian-language magazine (1906–1908)

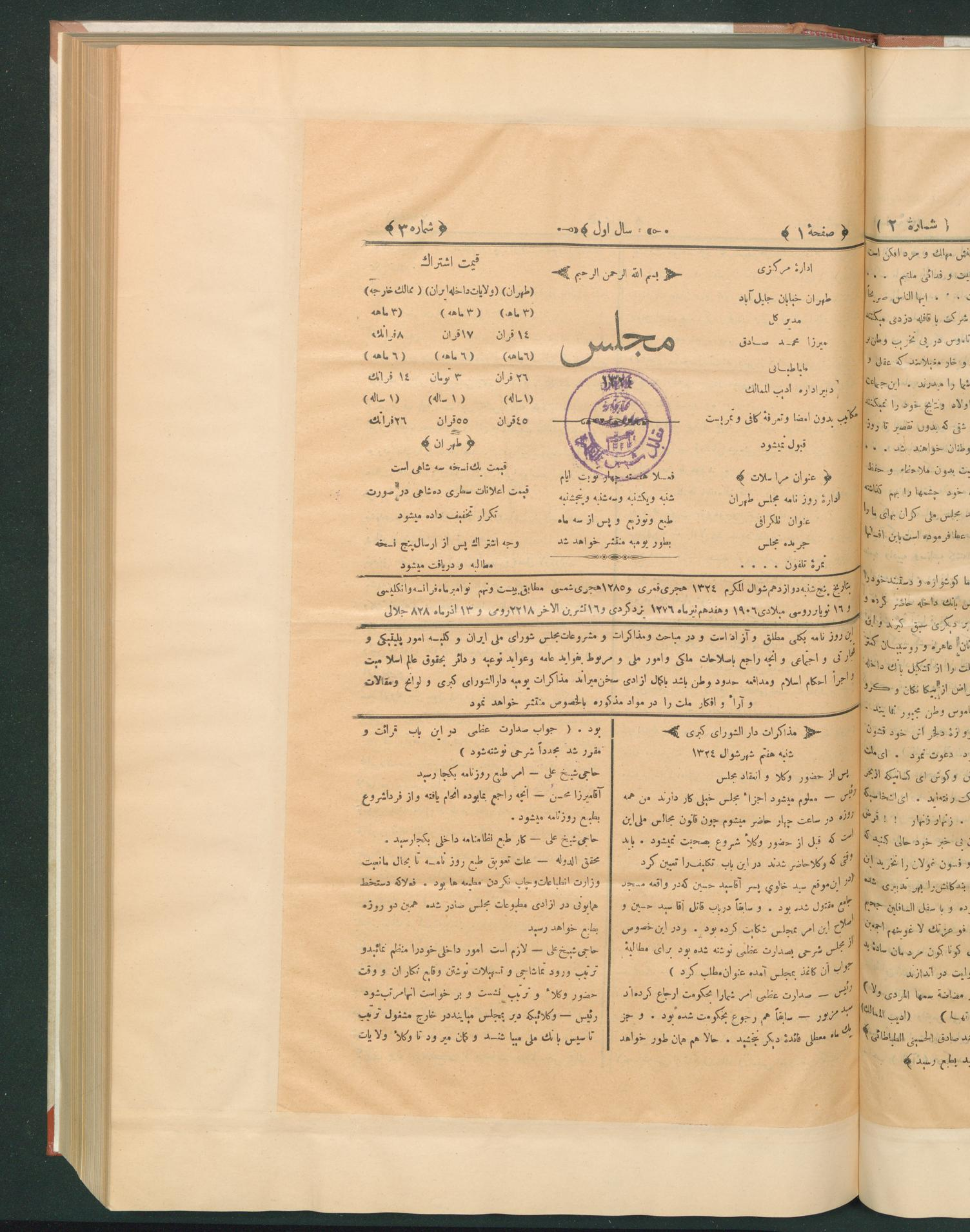
- Editor: Seyed Mohammad Hosseini Tabatabaei
- Categories: Politics, society, economics
- Publisher: Mirza Mohsen Mojtahed
- Founder: Mirza Mohsen Mojtahed
- Founded: 1906
- First issue: 25 November 1906
- Final issue: 1908
- Country: Qajar Iran
- Based in: Tehran
- Language: Persian
- Website: nbn-resolving.de/urn:nbn:de:hbz:5:1-225319

The Persian-language journal Majlis (Persian: مجلس, lit. 'Parliament / Assembly'; DMG: Maǧlis) was published in Tehran between 1906 and 1908. A total of 325 issues was edited in one volume.

== History and profile ==
The first issue of Majlis appeared on 25 November 1906. Each issue consisted of eight pages and was distributed free of charge.

Majlis was considered to be the journal of the Persian Constitutional Revolution and the mouthpiece of the parliament. It was dedicated to publishing parliament's negotiations and their results directly and unfiltrated to the public. A liberal reformer, Mirza Mohsen Mojtahed who was also known as Agha Mirza Mohsen was its founder and editor. Its chief editor was Seyed Mohammad Hosseini Tabatabaei.

The magazine provided as much information about the rural dimension of the revolution as about the socio-economic situation in the country at that time as well as the various strikes and protests. Letters to the editor also reflected the prevailing controversies between intellectuals, conservatives and the peasantry on various political issues. During the period of its publication, the magazine was not subject to any state censorship unlike other publications such as Nida-yi Vatan.
