= Kampong Prieng =

Commune in Sangkae District, Battambang Province, Cambodia

Kampong Prieng ឃុំកំពង់ព្រៀង
- Commune
- Location within Cambodia
- Coordinates: 12°56′25″N 103°21′09″E
- Country: Cambodia
- Province: Battambang Province
- District: Sangkae District
- Villages: 6
- Time zone: UTC+07
- Geocode: 020806

Kampong Prieng (Khmer: ឃុំកំពង់ព្រៀង) is a khum (commune) of Sangkae District in Battambang Province in north-western Cambodia.

== Villages ==
- Sambok Ak
- Sala Trav
- Kach Roteh
- Thmei
- Os Tuk
- Kbal Thnal
