= Reang Kesei =

Coordinates: 12°58′N 103°16′E

Reang Kesei ឃុំរាំងកេសី
- Commune
- Interactive map of Reang Kesei
- Country: Cambodia
- Province: Battambang Province
- District: Sangkae District
- Villages: 9
- Time zone: UTC+07

Reang Kesei (Khmer: ឃុំរាំងកេសី) is a khum (commune) of Sangkae District in Battambang Province in north-western Cambodia.

== Villages ==
- Tuol Snuol
- Voat Kandal
- Reang Kesei
- Reang Kraol
- Prey Svay
- Svay Cheat
- Boeng Veaeng
- Damnak Dangkao
- Kakaoh Kambot
