= HACC Cambodia =

HIV/AIDS Coordinating Committee
- Abbreviation: HACC Cambodia
- Formation: 1995
- Type: Non-governmental organization
- Legal status: NGO
- Purpose: HIV/AIDS prevention
- Headquarters: Phnom Penh
- Location: Cambodia
- Region served: Nationwide
- Official language: Khmer, English
- Steering-committee chair: Chum Thou
- Key people: Tim Vora, Heng Koy, Haun Borany
- Main organ: Assembly
- Budget: Over US$800,000 per year
- Staff: 23 (2012)
- Volunteers: 3
- Website: www.hacccambodia.org

The HIV/AIDS Coordinating Committee (HACC) (គណៈកម្មការសំរបសំរួលប្រយុទ្ធនឹងជំងឺអេដស៍) is an HIV/AIDS Cambodian non-governmental network representing over 120 NGOs working with the disease in Cambodia. It was established in 1993 to coordinate civil-society organizations and promote the sharing of information, experiences, and advances in the field among these organizations to address HIV/AIDS in Cambodia.

== Leadership ==
HACC is governed by a voluntary steering committee elected from the NGO's membership.

- Steering committee (2011–2013):
  - Kim Sokuntheary, chair
  - Phok Bunroeun, Vice-chair
  - Prang Chanthy, Treasurer
  - Chhun Roeurn
  - Penh Sakun
  - Sem Peng Sean
  - Sok Pun
- Steering committee (2010–2011):
  - Pon Yut Sakara, Chair
  - Long Leng, Vice-chair
  - Sum Satum, Treasurer
  - Sok Pun
  - Phok Bunroeun
  - Buth Saman
  - Srey Vanthuon

Tim Vora is the HACC's executive director.

== Activities ==
HACC provides opportunities for networking among members and other civil-society networks to encourage policy change and protection for people living with HIV/AIDS and develop preventive measures. The organization works with the government, international donors, and the UN by:

- Collaborating with members to coordinate the NGO response to HIV and AIDS at the national and provincial levels.
- Promoting communication and information-sharing among members and all involved in the HIV and AIDS response in Cambodia and internationally.
- Raising awareness of HIV and AIDS and gaps in service delivery of HIV/AIDS treatment and preventative measures.
- Representing NGOs responding to HIV and AIDS at national and international forums, where they have received a mandate from their members to do so.
- Advocating for full civil-society involvement in determining policy, setting targets, developing plans, and monitoring progress related to HIV and AIDS response on a national level.

HACC and other members working with HIV/AIDS focus on youth as most at-risk people (MARP), along with orphans and vulnerable children (OVCs), injecting drug users (IDU/DU), sex workers, and prisoners. In the National Strategic Plan III (NSPIII) 2011–2015, HACC played a role in coordinating and facilitating the participation of civil societies in planning and launching the plan, Water Festival Day, and World AIDS Day in coordination with Cambodia's National AIDS Authority.
