= Ou Dambang Muoy =

Ou Dambang Muoy ឃុំអូរដំបង ១
- Commune
- Location within Cambodia
- Coordinates: 13°01′21″N 103°14′18″E
- Country: Cambodia
- Province: Battambang Province
- District: Sangkae District
- Villages: 6
- Time zone: UTC+07
- Geocode: 020808

Ou Dambang Muoy (Khmer: ឃុំអូរដំបង ១) is a khum (commune) of Sangkae District in Battambang Province in north-western Cambodia.

== Villages ==
- Voat Ta Moem
- Baoh Pou
- Ou Khcheay
- Ou Sralau
- Voat Chaeng
- Samraong Kaong
