= .kh =

Internet country code top-level domain for Cambodia

- Introduced: 20 February 1996
- TLD type: Country code top-level domain
- Status: Active
- Registry: Telecommunication Regulator of Cambodia (TRC)
- Sponsor: Ministry of Posts and Telecommunications
- Intended use: Entities connected with Cambodia
- Actual use: Used in Cambodia
- Registered domains: 3,255 (2022-11-30)
- Registration restrictions: Restricted to Cambodian entities and citizens; "Offensive or inappropriate" names may be refused registration
- Structure: Registrations are at the third level beneath second-level labels
- Documents: .kh Guidelines
- Dispute policies: Registered trade name owners have priority and can challenge conflicting registrations
- Registry website: domain.gov.kh

.kh is the Internet country code top-level domain (ccTLD) for the Kingdom of Cambodia. It was formerly administered by the Ministry of Post and Telecommunications of Cambodia from 1997. In September 2012, the domain name was transferred to the Telecommunication Regulator of Cambodia, which currently administers it. The domain name is named after the ISO 3166-2 alpha code KH, which is named after the majority ethnic group of Cambodia, the Khmer people.

Only Cambodia-registered companies, government agencies, organisations and Cambodian citizens can register domain names.

== Second level domains ==
- .per.kh - Personal names.
- .com.kh - Commercial entities.
- .edu.kh - Educational institutions.
- .gov.kh - Government entities.
- .mil.kh - Military entities.
- .net.kh - Network infrastructure.
- .org.kh - Non-commercial organizations.
