= Kampong Preah =

Commune in Sangkae District, Battambang Province, Cambodia

Coordinates: 13°01′N 103°19′E

Kampong Preah ឃុំកំពង់ព្រះ
- Commune
- Interactive map of Kampong Preah
- Country: Cambodia
- Province: Battambang Province
- District: Sangkae District
- Villages: 6
- Time zone: UTC+07

Kampong Preah (Khmer: ឃុំកំពង់ព្រះ) is a khum (commune) of Sangkae District in Battambang Province in north-western Cambodia.

== Villages ==
- Prey Chaek
- Panhnha
- Kralanh
- Kampong Preah
- Andoung Trach
- Srah Kaev
