= Telecommunications in Cambodia =

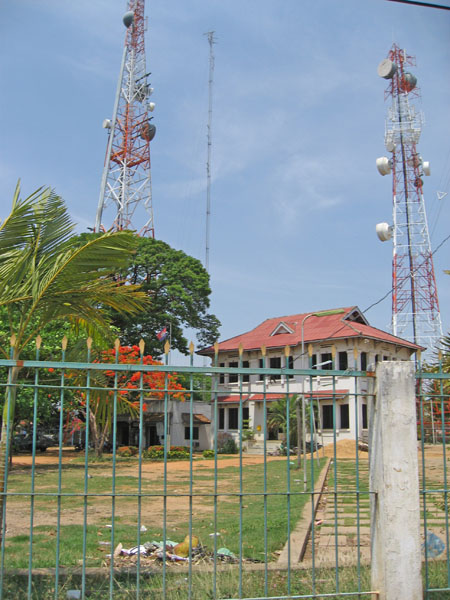
- Communications towers in Kampong Thom
- Telephone land lines: 55,603 (2020)
- Mobile lines: 21,086,791 (2020)
- Telephone country code: +855
- Internet users: 5,440,559 (2019)
- Internet country code: .kh

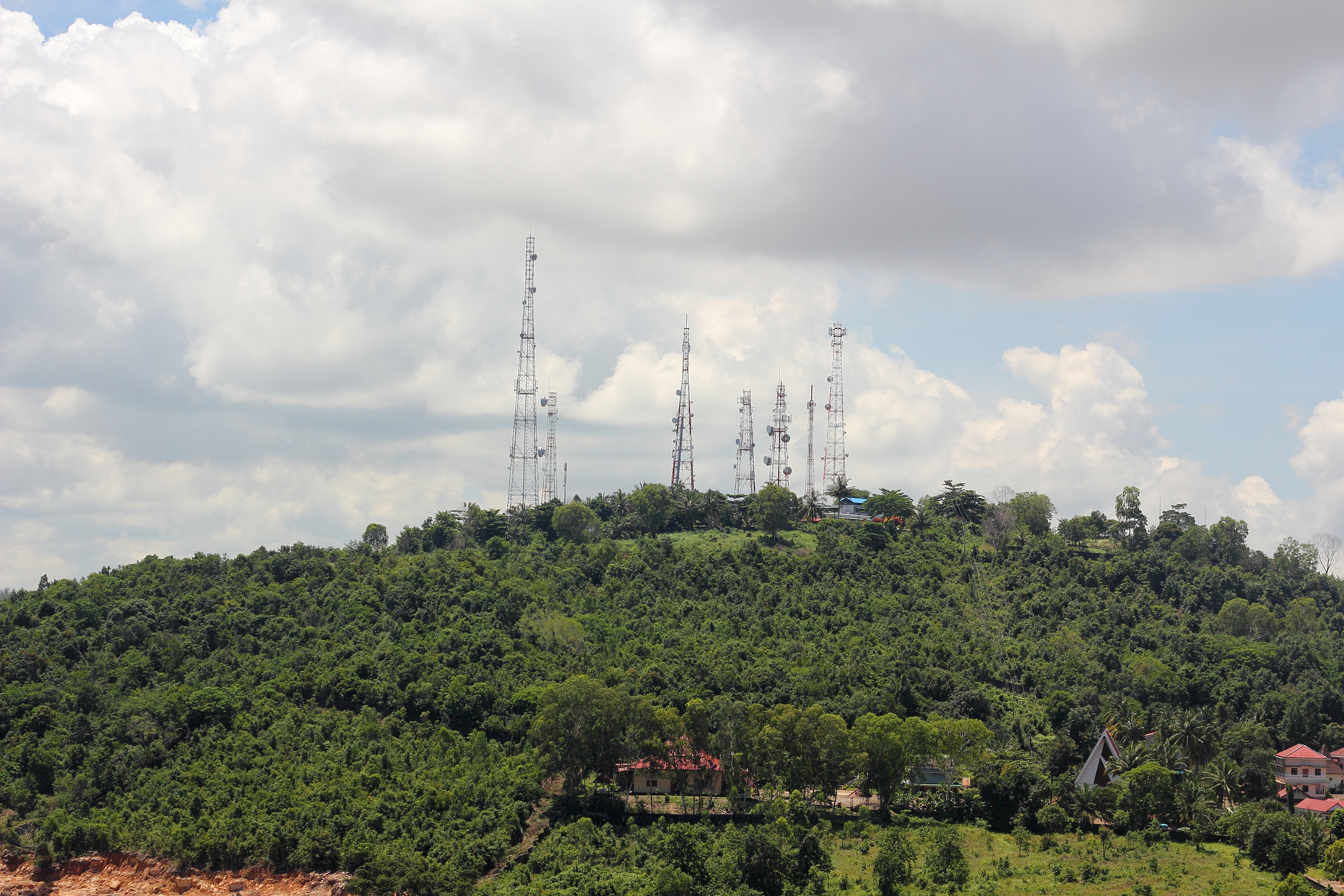
Sihanoukville - communication towers.

Telecommunications in Cambodia include telephone, radio, television, and Internet services, which are regulated by the Ministry of Posts and Telecommunications. Transport and posts were restored throughout most of the country in the early 1980s during the People's Republic of Kampuchea regime after being disrupted under Democratic Kampuchea (Khmer Rouge).

In January 1987, the Soviet-aided Intersputnik space communications station began operation in Phnom Penh and established two-way telecommunication links between the Cambodian capital and the cities of Moscow, Hanoi, Vientiane, and Paris. The completion of the earth satellite station restored the telephone and telex links among Phnom Penh, Hanoi, and other countries for the first time since 1975. Although telecommunications services were initially limited to the government, these advances in communications helped break down the country's isolation, both internally and internationally.

Today, with the availability of mobile phones, communications are open to all, though the country's former Prime Minister Hun Sen decreed that 3G mobile phones would not be allowed to support video calling.

== Telephone ==
As of Q1 2020, Cambodia's mobile connection is at 21.4 million. Smart Axiata, a leading telecommunications company, in 2019 conducted a live trial of its 5G network with support from China's Huawei. The company said it expects to begin rolling out 5G services in Cambodia by the end of 2019.

GSMA predicted that by 2025, Cambodia will have approximately 24.3 million total mobile connections, with smartphone connections up to 69%. The market is predicted to adopt 1.6 million 5G connections within 5 years from 2020. Even so, it's believed that 4G still has room for growth and will continue to be the majority network connection.

The government state communications corporation is Telecom Cambodia, founded in 2006 as an expansion of the telecom operating department of the Ministry of Posts and Telecommunications.

=== Mobile Network Operators ===
Carrier	Company	Prefixes
Cellcard	CamGSM Co., Ltd.	011, 012, 014, 017, 061, 077, 078, 085, 089, 092, 095, 099, 076*
Metfone	Viettel (Cambodia) Pte., Ltd.	060, 066, 067, 068, 090, 031*, 071*, 088*, 097*
Smart	Smart Axiata Co., Ltd.	010, 015, 016, 069, 070, 081, 086, 087, 093, 098, 096*
yes seatel	South East Asia Telecom (Cambodia) Co., Ltd. (SEATEL)	018*

== Radio and television ==
As of 2019, Cambodian broadcasters were a mixture of state-owned, joint public-private, and privately owned companies.

=== Radio stations ===
As of 2019, there were roughly 84 radio broadcast stations: 1 state-owned broadcaster with multiple stations and a large mixture of public and private broadcasters. Several international broadcasters are also available.

==== Phnom Penh ====
- Apsara Radio FM 97
- Angel Radio 96.3Mhz Kampot
- BBC World Service 100.0 MHz
- Dance Radio 96.6Mhz
- DAP Radio FM 93.75
- Family FM 99.5
- Hang Meas Radio FM 104.5
- Koh Santepheap Daily FM 87.75
- National Radio Kampuchea
- Phnom Penh Radio FM 103
- Radio FM 90.5
- Radio Beehive FM 105
- DaunPenh eFM 87.50Mhz
- ABC News FM 107.5
- Lotus Radio FM 100.5hz
- Radio Free Asia
- Radio Khmer FM 107
- Radio Love FM 97.5
- Radio Town FM 102.3 MHz
- Raksmey Hang Meas Radio FM 95.7000
- Royal Cambodia Armed Forces Radio FM 98
- Voice of America Khmer
- Women's Media Centre of Cambodia (WMC) Radio FM 102

==== Provincial stations ====
There are radio stations in each of the following provinces: Banteay Meanchey, Battambang, Kampong Cham, Kampong Thom, Kampot, Kandal, Pailin, Preah Vihear, Siem Reap, Sihanoukville and Svay Rieng.

=== Television ===
Cambodia has 27 TV broadcast stations with most operating on multiple channels, including 1 state-operated station broadcasting from multiple locations, 11 stations either jointly operated or privately owned with some broadcasting from several locations. Multi-channel cable and satellite systems are also available. There is one Chinese joint venture television station with the Ministry of Interior. Several television and radio operators broadcast online only (often via Facebook).

==== Broadcast and cable networks ====
- PNN TV
- Apsara Television (TV11)
- Bayon Television
- Bayon News Television
- Cambodia Cable Television (CCTV)
- Cambodian News Channel (CNC)
- Cambodian Television Network (CTN)
- CTV 8 HD
- Hang Meas HDTV
- Khmer Television 9 HDTV (TV9 HDTV)
- My TV
- National Television of Cambodia (TVK)
- One TV (Royal Media Entertainment Corporation, LTD)
- Phnom Penh Municipal Cable Television (PPCTV Co., LTD)
- Phnom Penh Television (TV3)
- TV5 Cambodia
- One News

==== Provincial television stations ====
- Kandal Province - Broadcasting on channel 27, Bayon Television is Cambodia's only UHF channel. A private television company belonging to Prime Minister Hun Sen, it also operates Bayon Radio FM 95 MHz. It was established in January 1998.
- Mondulkiri - Established in 1999, relays TVK on channel 10.
- Preah Vihear - Established in 2006, broadcasts on channel 7.
- Ratanakiri - Established in 1993, relays TVK on channel 7.
- Siem Reap - Established in 2002, relays TV3 on channel 12.

=== Most viewed channels ===
Position	Channel	Share of total viewing (%)
1	Hang Meas	22.1
2	CTN	18.3
3	MyTV	10.5
4	PNN TV	8.1
5	TV5	4.4
6	Bayon TV	2.6
7	CTV 8	2.0
8	SEATV	1.4
9	TV9	1.2
10	TV11	1.0
11	TV3	0.9
12	CNC	0.8
13	ETV	0.6
14	TVK	0.4

== Internet ==
As of 2019, the number of internet users in Cambodia rose to 15.8 million, about 98.5% of the population. According to the Telecommunications Regulator of Cambodia (TRC), the number of registered SIM cards rose by 9.4 percent during the first half of the year, reaching 20.8 million. The SIM card market is saturated, with Cambodia now having more active SIM cards than people. According to TRC, there are six telecommunications firms in the country: Cellcard, Smart Axiata, Metfone, Seatel, Cootel, and qb. Three companies, Metfone, Cellcard, and Smart, account for 90% of users. TRC noted that, as of February 2019, Facebook had seven million users in Cambodia.

=== Internet service providers ===
As of August 2025, the following are the active licensed telecommunications operators authorized to provide internet services in Cambodia, according to the Telecommunication Regulator of Cambodia:

- Angkor Cable TV Internet Co., Ltd.
- Angkor Data Communication Group (ADCG)
- Bee Union (Cambodia) Telecom Co., Ltd.
- BigHub Co., Ltd.
- Branch of China Telecom Global Limited
- Branch of NTT (Thailand) Limited
- Cambo Technology Co., Ltd.
- CamGSM Plc.
- Camintel Co., Ltd.
- China Unicom (Cambodia) Operations Co., Ltd.
- Citylink Co., Ltd.
- Cogetel Ltd.
- Empire Tech Co., Ltd.
- Ezecom Co., Ltd.
- Fast One (Cambodia) Co., Ltd.
- Fiber Nanotech (Cambodia) Co., Ltd.
- Maximum Business Information Technology Co., Ltd. (MAXBIT)
- Mega Truenet Communication Co., Ltd.
- Monorom Advanced Technologies Co., Ltd.
- Neocom ISP Limited
- NSM Solution and Maintenance Co., Ltd.
- Phnom Penh Cable TV Co., Ltd. (PPCTV)
- S.I Group Co., Ltd.
- Smart Axiata Co., Ltd.
- South East Asia Telecom (Cambodia) Co., Ltd. (SEATEL)
- Spidernet Co., Ltd.
- Telecom Cambodia (TC)
- Telnet Co., Ltd.
- Time Dotcom (Cambodia) Co., Ltd.
- Today Communication Co., Ltd.
- Toule Technologies and Communications Co., Ltd.
- Turbotech Co., Ltd.
- Viettel (Cambodia) Pte., Ltd.
- Vonet Technology Co., Ltd.
- Wicam Corporation Co., Ltd.
- Wingel Cooperation Co., Ltd.
- World City Co., Ltd. (Camko City)
- Xinwei (Cambodia) Telecom Co., Ltd.
- Ztnet Co., Ltd.

=== Internet censorship and surveillance ===
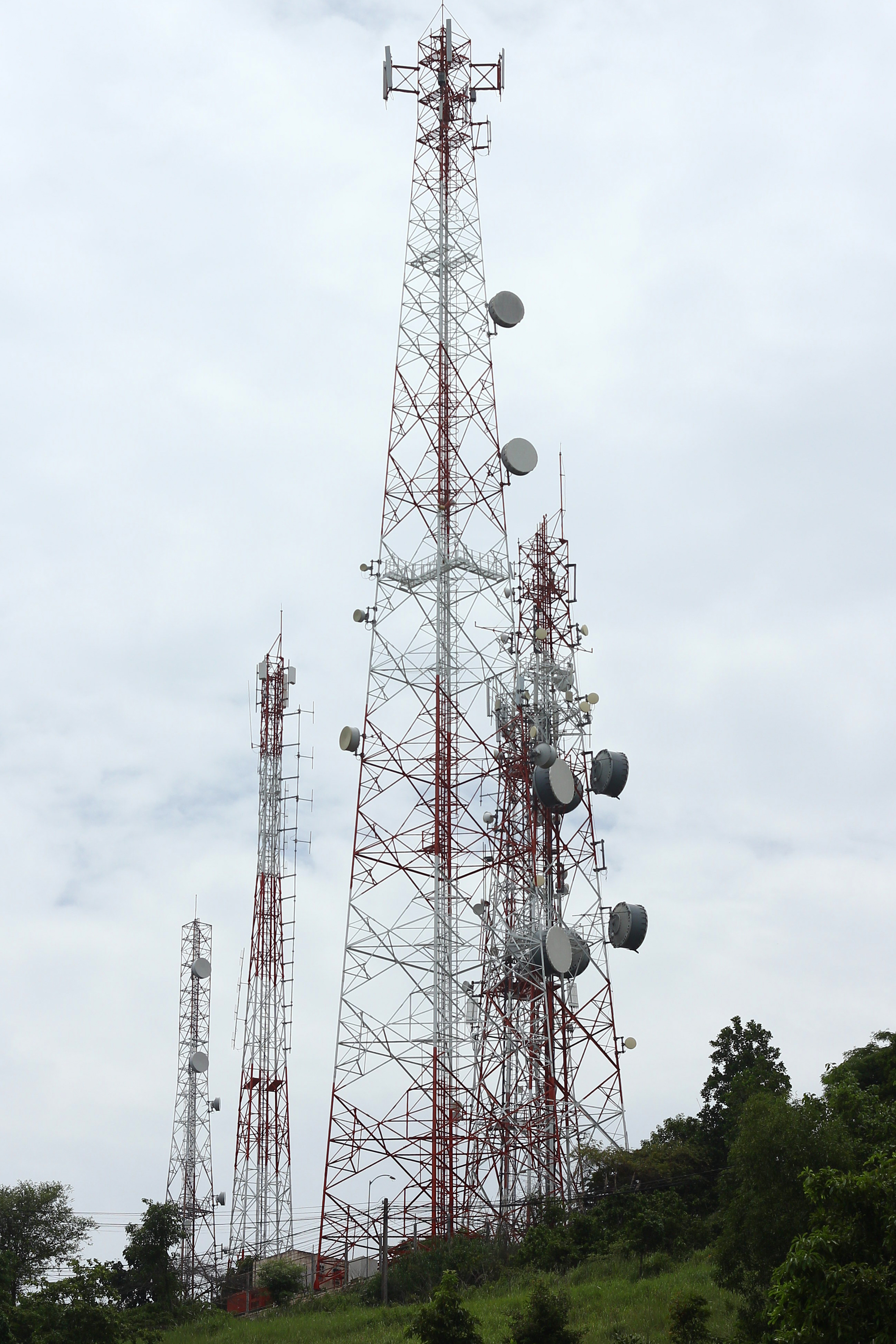

In its Freedom on the Net 2013 report, Freedom House gives Cambodia a "Freedom on the Net Status" of "partly free".

Compared to traditional media in Cambodia, new media, including online news, social networks and personal blogs, enjoy more freedom and independence from government censorship and restrictions. However, the government does proactively block blogs and websites, either on moral grounds, or for hosting content deemed critical of the government. The government restricts access to sexually explicit content, but does not systematically censor online political discourse. Since 2011 three blogs hosted overseas have been blocked for perceived antigovernment content. In 2012, government ministries threatened to shutter internet cafes too near schools—citing moral concerns—and instituted surveillance of cafe premises and cell phone subscribers as a security measure.

Early in 2011, very likely at the urging of the Ministry of Posts and Telecommunications, all Cambodian ISPs blocked the hosting service Blogspot, apparently in reaction to a December 2010 post on KI-Media, a blog run by Cambodians from both inside and outside the country. The site, which is often critical of the administration, described the prime minister and other officials as "traitors" after opposition leader Sam Rainsy alleged they had sold land to Vietnam at a contested national border. All ISPs but one subsequently restored service to the sites following customer complaints. In February 2011, however, multiple ISPs reinstated blocks on individual Blogspot sites, including KI-Media, Khmerization—another critical citizen journalist blog—and a blog by the Khmer political cartoonist Sacrava.

There are no government restrictions on access to the Internet or credible reports that the government monitors e-mail or Internet chat rooms without appropriate legal authority. During 2012 NGOs expressed concern about potential online restrictions. In February and November, the government published two circulars, which, if implemented fully, would require Internet cafes to install surveillance cameras and restrict operations within major urban centers. Activists also reported concern about a draft “cybercrimes” law, noting that it could be used to restrict online freedoms. The government maintained it would only regulate criminal activity.

The constitution provides for freedom of speech and press; however, these rights were not always respected in practice. The 1995 press law prohibits prepublication censorship or imprisonment for expressing opinions; however, the government uses the penal code to prosecute citizens on defamation, disinformation, and incitement charges. The penal code does not prescribe imprisonment for defamation, but does for incitement or spreading disinformation, which carry prison sentences of up to three years. Judges also can order fines, which may lead to jail time if not paid. The constitution requires that free speech not adversely affect public security.

The constitution declares that the king is “inviolable,” and a Ministry of Interior directive conforming to the defamation law reiterates these limits and prohibits publishers and editors from disseminating stories that insult or defame government leaders and institutions. The continued criminalization of defamation and disinformation and a broad interpretation of criminal incitement constrains freedom of expression.

The law provides for the privacy of residence and correspondence and prohibits illegal searches; however, NGOs report that police routinely conduct searches and seizures without warrants.

Corruption remains pervasive and governmental human rights bodies are generally ineffective. A weak judiciary that sometimes fails to provide due process or fair trial procedures is a serious problem. The courts lack human and financial resources and, as a result, are not truly independent and are subject to corruption and political influence.

On 17 February 2021, the Cambodian government announced its plans to launch a censorship scheme called "National Internet Gateway" which heavily resembles China's Great Firewall, and it will get launched in February 2022.

== See also ==
- Media of Cambodia
- Ministry of Posts and Telecommunications (Cambodia)
