= Ta Pon =

Ta Pon ឃុំតាប៉ុន
- Commune
- Location within Cambodia
- Coordinates: 13°08′35″N 103°22′00″E
- Country: Cambodia
- Province: Battambang Province
- District: Sangkae District
- Villages: 5
- Time zone: UTC+07
- Geocode: 020803

Ta Pon (Khmer: ឃុំតាប៉ុន) is a khum (commune) of Sangkae District in Battambang Province in north-western Cambodia.

== Villages ==
- Boeng Tuem
- Svay Sa
- Samdach
- Basaet
- Ta Pon
