= Institut Pasteur du Cambodge =

Medical research institute in Phnom Penh, Cambodia

Institut Pasteur du Cambodge (IPC; Khmer: វិទ្យាស្ថានប៉ាស្ទ័រកម្ពុជា) is a medical research centre and public health institute in Phnom Penh, Cambodia. It is part of the Pasteur Institute's international network of health centres and is partnered with the Ministry of Health. It was first established in 1953 and reopened in 1992 after the 1991 Paris Peace Agreements.

== History ==
Since 1998, IPC has been the only source of post-exposure prophylaxis vaccinations in the prevention of rabies in Cambodia. The institute has rabies prevention centres in Phnom Penh, Battambang and Kampong Cham.

=== COVID-19 pandemic ===
From 2020, IPC has been part of the national committee involved in the public health response to the COVID-19 pandemic in Cambodia as well as conducting research into SARS-CoV-2. Researchers at IPC found through sequencing research that viruses from Cambodian horseshoe bats shared 97% similarity with SARS-CoV-2, providing knowledge into possible origins of COVID-19. IPC also conduct research on future emerging zoonoses.

== See also ==
- Health in Cambodia
