= National Information Communications Technology Development Authority, Cambodia =

The National Information Communications Technology Development Authority (NiDA) is a government agency responsible for managing the development of the information technology industry in Cambodia. Among the agency's projects are the computerization of government function and training of internet personnel.

== Projects ==
- GAIS, or Government Administration Information System, an approach to the overall computerization of the government using three core applications: Vehicle registration, Real estate registration and Resident registration.
- PAIS, or Provincial Administration Information System, involving GAIS methods to computerize the government at provincial level.
- Cisco Networking Academy Program, in association with the Royal University of Phnom Penh, awarding Cisco Career Certifications.

== See also ==
- Communications in Cambodia
- Information and communication technologies (ICT)
- Information and communication technologies in education
- Ministry of Posts and Telecommunications, Cambodia
