= Bayon Television =

- Country: Cambodia
- Headquarters: Phum Russei Sraoh, Sangkat Nirouth, Khan Chbar Ampov, Phnom Penh, Cambodia

Programming
- Language: Khmer
- Picture format: 576i (PAL); 576i (SDTV); 1080i (HDTV)

Ownership
- Owner: Bayon High Media System
- Key people: Hun Mana
- Sister channels: 95.0 Bayon FM; BTV News

History
- Launched: 1998; 27 years ago

Links
- Website: bayontv.com.kh

Availability

Terrestrial
- Analogue: Channel 27 (UHF)
- Cambodian DTH UHD: Channel 12 (HD)

Bayon Television (Bayon TV; Khmer: ទូរទស្សន៍បាយ័ន) is a Cambodian free-to-air television network. Bayon TV broadcasts from 06:00 to midnight.

== History ==
It was launched in January 1998 by Hun Mana, oldest daughter of prime minister Hun Sen. It is the second private television station and the first UHF channel in Cambodia (channel 27 in Phnom Penh), yet it did have two VHF relay stations. The name was selected in homage to King Jayavarman VII "Bayon" and uses an image of Brahma as its logo.

== Brand ==
=== Logo history ===
Years	Description
1998	An oval in Cambodian flag colours with Bayon inside and the word បាយ័ន.

=== Theme song ===
- Cambodian national anthem

== See also ==
- List of television stations in Cambodia
- Media of Cambodia
