= National Pediatric Hospital, Cambodia =

- Cambodian Ministry of Health

Geography
- Location: Phnom Penh, Cambodia
- Coordinates: 11.568°N 104.897°E

Organisation
- Type: Specialist

Services
- Speciality: Pediatric

Links
- Website: www.nphkh.org
- Lists: Hospitals in Cambodia

The National Pediatric Hospital of Cambodia (NPH) is a government-run pediatric hospital located in Phnom Penh. The hospital is managed by the Ministry of Health. As of March 2009 there were 100 doctors and 225 nurses on the hospital staff.

== See also ==
- Government of Cambodia
- Health in Cambodia
