= Voat Ta Muem =

Coordinates: 13°02′N 103°13′E

Voat Ta Muem ឃុំវត្តតាមិម
- Commune
- Interactive map of Voat Ta Muem
- Country: Cambodia
- Province: Battambang Province
- District: Sangkae District
- Villages: 6
- Time zone: UTC+07

Voat Ta Muem (Khmer: ឃុំវត្តតាមិម) is a khum (commune) of Sangkae District in Battambang Province in north-western Cambodia.

== Villages ==
- Kampong Ampil
- Kampong Chlang
- Ou Sralau
- Ou Khcheay
- Sla Kram
- Anlong Lvea
