= Camnet Internet Service =

Cambodian Internet service provider

Camnet Internet Service is an Internet service provider operated by the Ministry of Posts and Telecommunications of Cambodia. Camnet was established in 1997 by the Cambodian government and Telecom Cambodia with the support of the International Development Research Centre of Canada. Camnet was the first Internet service provider in Cambodia. Its main offices are located in Phnom Penh.

== See also ==
- Communications in Cambodia
- Internet
