= Ministry of Health (Cambodia) =

Government ministry of Cambodia

- ក្រសួងសុខាភិបាល; Krâsuŏng Sŏkhaphĭbal

Agency overview
- Formed: 1993
- Jurisdiction: Royal Government of Cambodia
- Headquarters: 80 Samdech Penn Nouth St. (289), Phnom Penh, Cambodia
- Minister responsible: Chheang Ra, Minister of Health
- Website: moh.gov.kh

The Ministry of Health (MoH; Khmer: ក្រសួងសុខាភិបាល, UNGEGN: Krâsuŏng Sŏkhaphĭbal) is the government ministry responsible for governing healthcare, the healthcare industry, public health and health-related NGOs in Cambodia. The Ministry governs and regulates the activity of medical professionals, hospitals and clinics in the country. As of 2013, the Minister of Health was Mam Bunheng. The Ministry maintains 24 provincial health departments, and its main offices are located in Phnom Penh.

== Directorates and departments ==
The Ministry of Health is organized into three administrative directorates, with departments and associated agencies as shown below:

- Directorate General for Administration and Finance - administration, personnel, budget and finance
- Directorate General for Health
  - Department of Planning and Health Information (DPHI)
  - Department of Health Prevention [sic] (DHP)
  - Department of Hospital Services (DPS)
  - Department of Human Resource (DHR)
  - Department of Essential Drug and Food (DDF)
  - Department of Communicable Disease Control (CDC)
  - Department of International Cooperation (DIC)
  - Department of Internal Audit (DIA)
  - International Relations Bureau
- Directorate General for Inspection

== Affiliated organizations ==
Organizations under the purview of the ministry include:

- National Malaria Center of Cambodia
- University of Health Sciences - Cambodia
- Regional schools of medical care
- National Centre for HIV/AIDS Dermatology and STDs (NCHADS)
- Other national programs and institutes
  - National Reproductive Health Program (NRHP)

=== National hospitals ===
National hospitals of Cambodia include:

- Calmette Hospital
- Kantha Bopha Hospital (KBH)
  - Jayavarmann VII Hospital
  - Kantha Bopha I Hospital
  - Kantha Bopha II Hospital
  - Kantha Bopha IV Hospital
  - Kantha Bopha V Hospital
- National Maternal and Child Health Centre (NMCHC)
- National Pediatric Hospital (NPH)
- Preah Ang Duong Hospital
- Khmer-Soviet Friendship Hospital (KSFH)
- Cambodian-Chinese Friendship Preah Kosomak Hospital
- National Center for Tuberculosis and Leprosy Control (CENAT)
- Techo Santepheap National Hospital
- Luang Me Hospital

== See also ==
- Royal Government of Cambodia
- Health in Cambodia
- Institut Pasteur du Cambodge
