= Wang Anlong =

Chinese politician

- 王安龙

Secretary of Discipline Inspection Commission of Central Theater Command Ground Force
- Incumbent
- Assumed office June 2020

Deputy Director of the General Office of Central Military Commission
- In office March 2015 – May 2020
- Chairman: Xi Jinping

Director of the Political Department of 31 Army
- In office 2014–2015
- Preceded by: Qin Shutong

Personal details
- Born: China
- Party: Chinese Communist Party

Military service
- Allegiance: China
- Branch/service: People's Liberation Army Ground Force

Chinese name
- Traditional Chinese: 王安龍
- Simplified Chinese: 王安龙
Transcriptions
Standard Mandarin
- Hanyu Pinyin: Wāng Ānlóng

Wang Anlong is a Chinese military officer and the current secretary of Discipline Inspection Commission of Central Theater Command Ground Force. Previously he served as deputy director of the General Office of Central Military Commission since March 2015. Wang is a member of the Chinese Communist Party. He holds the rank of Major general in the People's Liberation Army. He served in various posts in Nanjing Military Region before serving as director of the Political Department of 31 Army in 2014.

Military offices
Preceded by Qin Shutong (秦树桐)	Director of the Political Department of 31 Army; 2014–2015	Succeeded by ?
