= Anlong Vil =

Anlong Vil ឃុំអន្លង់វិល
- Commune
- Location within Cambodia
- Coordinates: 13°5′N 103°14′E
- Country: Cambodia
- Province: Battambang
- District: Sangkae
- Time zone: UTC+7 (ICT)

Anlong Vil (Khmer: អន្លង់វិល) is a commune (khum) of Sangkae District in Battambang Province in north-western Cambodia.

== Villages ==
- Chrab Veal
- Beng
- Anlong Vil
- Ou Muni Muoy
- Ou Muni Pir
- Chumnik
- Puk Chhma
- Spong
- Svay Kang
