= National Malaria Center of Cambodia =

Cambodian Medical Agency

The National Center for Parasitology, Entomology and Malaria Control (CNM) is a government agency responsible for directing and supervising the control of vector-borne disease in Cambodia. In conjunction with disease control the Center creates health education programs and manages scientific research projects. It is governed by the Ministry of Health. Main offices of the Center are located in Phnom Penh; the Center Director is Dr. Doung Socheat.

== Focus areas ==
The Center has four principal disease targets:

1. Malaria
2. DHF - Dengue haemorrhagic fever
3. Filariasis and schistosomiasis
4. Intestinal parasitic infections

== Sanction and affiliation ==
Internationally, the Center works with the World Health Organization, World Bank, European Commission, USAID, JICA, IFRC and many others. Domestically, the Center works with the Ministry of Health, Ministry of National Defence, Ministry of Education, Youth and Sport, and others.

== See also ==
- Government of Cambodia
- Health in Cambodia
