= Nida-yi Vatan =

Weekly newspaper in Qajar Iran (1906–1908)

- Type: Weekly newspaper
- Founder(s): Ahmad Majd Al Islam Kirmani
- Editor-in-chief: Ahmad Majd Al Islam Kirmani
- Founded: 27 December 1906
- Political alignment: Liberal
- Language: Persian
- Ceased publication: June 1908
- Headquarters: Tehran
- Country: Iran

Nida-yi Vatan (Persian: ندای وطن, lit. 'The Country's Call') was a weekly newspaper being one of the publications that were started following the Iranian constitutional revolution in 1906. The paper supported a constitutional rule in Iran and appeared until 1908.

== History and profile ==
Nida-yi Vatan was established by the journalist Ahmad Majd Al Islam Kirmani who also edited the paper. Its first issue appeared on 27 December 1906. Nida-yi Vatan was headquartered in Tehran.

Kirmani described the paper as a liberal publication which attempted to make the notion of constitutionalism much more popular in the country. In each issue the statement hubb al-watan min al-iman (Persian: love of homeland is of the faith) was put under its title. This sentence is attributed by the Sufi Muslims to Prophet Mohammad which refers to the Sufis' attempt to reach unity with the divine. In the paper, this statement was employed to encourage patriotism among its readers.

The paper frequently featured brief biographies of the deputies. It also published patriotic poems and letters from its readers. Unlike other publications established in the same period such as Majlis the paper was strictly controlled by the state. Nida-yi Vatan folded in June 1908.

Some of its issues are archived by the University of Chicago Library.
