= Telecom Cambodia =

Telecom Cambodia (TC) is a state corporation of Cambodia, and is the principal telecom company of that country. The company was launched in 2006 as part of the Royal Government's Second Mandate, by the Ministry of Posts and Telecommunications, which until then had operated the country's telecom network itself. The head offices of the company are located in Phnom Penh. TC provides service to every province of Cambodia.

== Internet ==
Telecom Cambodia operates CamNet, Cambodia's first internet service provider.

== See also ==
- Communications in Cambodia
- Government of Cambodia
- Telecommunications
