= TV5 Cambodia =

Television channel in Cambodia

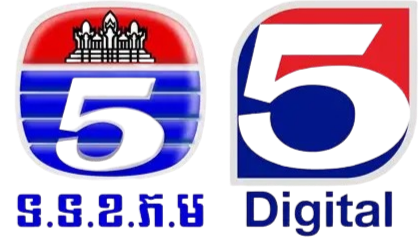
- Country: Cambodia
- Headquarters: Phnom Penh

Ownership
- Owner: Royal Cambodian Armed Forces

History
- Founded: 1995

Links
- Website: www.tv5hd.com

TV5 Cambodia (Khmer: ប៉ុស្តិ៍លេខ ៥ កម្ពុជា) is a terrestrial television channel in Cambodia that was launched in 1992. Both the Cambodian Ministry of National Defence and Thai media company KANTANA own an equal share of 50% each in it. The Ministry of National Defence controls the news coverage, while KANTANA controls the advertising and entertainment. The channel produces its own Cambodian dramas for programming. TV5 Cambodia is the first Cambodian television station to broadcast in digital.

According to a 2015 report by the Media Ownership Monitor, the channel rarely talks about opposition parties in its news service and it also carries Thai series, popular among the youth.
