= Nida, West Virginia =

- Unincorporated community
- Location within West Virginia Location within the United States
- Coordinates: 38°27′43″N 79°52′36″W
- Country: United States
- State: West Virginia
- County: Pocahontas
- Elevation: 2,569 ft (783 m)
- Time zone: UTC-5 (Eastern (EST))
  - Summer (DST): UTC-4 (EDT)
- Area codes: 304 & 681
- GNIS feature ID: 1555224

Nida is an unincorporated community in Pocahontas County, West Virginia, United States. Nida is located on the Greenbrier River, 6.5 miles (10.5 km) south-southwest of Durbin.
