= Sangkae District =

Sangkae District ស្រុកសង្កែ
- District (Srok)
- Interactive map of Sangkae District
- Country: Cambodia
- Province: Battambang

Population (1998)
  - Total: 106,267
- Time zone: UTC+7 (ICT)

Sangkae District (Khmer: ស្រុកសង្កែ) is a district (srok) within Battambang Province, in north-western Cambodia. The Sangkae river gives its name to the district.

== Administration ==
The district is subdivided into 10 communes (khum).

=== Communes and villages ===
Khum (Commune)	Phum (Villages)
Anlong Vil	Chrab Veal, Beng, Anlong Vil, O Muni Muoy, O Muni Pir, Chumnik, Puk Chhma, Spong, Svay Kang
Norea	Norea Muoy, Norea Pi, Balat, Ta Kok
Ta Pon	Boeng Tuem, Svay Sa, Samdach, Basaet, Ta Pon
Roka	Chhung Tradak, Pou Battambang, Ambaeng Thngae, Roka, Ta Haen Muoy, Ta Haen Pi
Kampong Preah	Prey Chaek, Panhnha, Kralanh, Kampong Preah, Andoung Trach, Srah Kaev
Kampong Preang	Sambok Ak, Sala Trav, Kach Roteh, Thmei, Os Touk, Kbal Thnal
Reang Kesei	Tuol Snuol, Wat Kandal, Reang Kesei, Reang Kraol, Prey Svay, Svay Cheat, Boeng Veaeng, Damnak Dangkao, Kakaoh Kambot
O Dambang Muoy	Wat Ta Meum, Baoh Pou, O Khcheay, O Sralau, Wat Chaeng, Samraong Kaong
O Dambang Pi	O Dambang, Svay Chrum, Kampong Mdaok, Svay Thum, Dampouk Khpos, Tuol Lveang
Wat Ta Meum	Kampong Ampil, Kampong Chlang, O Sralau, O Khcheay, Sla Kram, Anlong Lvea
