= Ministry of Tourism (Cambodia) =

Government ministry of Cambodia

Ministry of Tourism of the Kingdom of Cambodia
- ក្រសួងទេសចរណ៍

Agency overview
- Jurisdiction: Government of Cambodia
- Minister responsible: H.E. HUOT Hak, Minister of Tourism
- Website: www.tourism.gov.kh

The Ministry of Tourism (Khmer: ក្រសួងទេសចរណ៍; Krasuong Tesachar) is a government ministry of Cambodia.

The current Minister of Tourism is Excellency Mr. HUOT Hak.

== Functions ==
The Ministry of Tourism has the following functions and responsibilities:

- Defining and developing tourism policies and the Tourism Development Plan;
- stimulating and encouraging investments in the tourism sector in accordance with national development strategies;
- organizing and controlling the tourism industrial sector;
- organizing and supervising the provision of professional services in the tourism sector;
- organizing, supervising, and maintaining the natural and man-made tourism resorts and tourism development areas in the Kingdom of Cambodia;
- considering and supervising proposals to establish private schools and other vocational training centers serving the tourism sector;
- conducting advertising of tourism fields inside and outside of the country;
- organizing and establishing representatives in foreign countries in cooperation with the Ministry of Foreign Affairs and Cooperation;
- entering into contracts related to tourism, after an approval in principle from the Royal Government;
- issuing operation licenses to tourism companies, travel agencies, and tourism guides;
- supervising tourism services and other businesses related to the tourism sector;
- inspecting the tourism sector.

== See also ==
- Government of Cambodia
