= Roka, Cambodia =

Roka ឃុំរកា
- Commune
- Location within Cambodia
- Coordinates: 13°05′35″N 103°18′27″E
- Country: Cambodia
- Province: Battambang Province
- District: Sangkae District
- Villages: 6
- Time zone: UTC+07
- Geocode: 020804

Roka (Khmer: ឃុំរកា) is a Khum (commune) of Sangkae District in Battambang Province in north-western Cambodia.

== Villages ==
- Chhung Tradak
- Pou Batdambang
- Ambaeng Thngae
- Roka
- Ta Haen Muoy
- Ta Haen Pir
