= University of Health Sciences (Cambodia) =

Public university in Phnom Penh, Cambodia

Coordinates: 11°34′27″N 104°55′03″E

- សាកលវិទ្យាល័យវិទ្យាសាស្រ្តសុខាភិបាល (Khmer); Université des sciences de la santé (French)
- Motto: រួមគ្នាឆ្ពោះទៅរកឧត្ដមភាពក្នុងការបណ្ដុះបណ្ដាល និងការស្រាវជ្រាវ (Khmer)
- Motto in English: Together Towards Excellence in Health Sciences Training and Research
- Type: Public research
- Established: 6 June 1946; 80 years ago
- Affiliations: Agence universitaire de la Francophonie; Ministry of Health
- Rector: Saphonn Vonthanak
- Academic staff: 1,720
- Students: 6,143
- Undergraduates: BMedSc, BDentSc, BPharm, BNurs, BMidW, BPH, BSc, Professional Diplomas, Associate degrees.
- Postgraduates: MD, DDS, PharmD, MPH, MSc, MHA.
- Doctoral students: Specialization (MD-D.E.S), PhD.
- Location: 73 Monivong Blvd (93), Phnom Penh, Cambodia
- Nickname: សាលាក្រហម (IPA: [salaː krɑhɑːm]; "Red School")
- Website: uhs.edu.kh

The University of Health Sciences (UHS; Khmer: សាកលវិទ្យាល័យវិទ្យាសាស្រ្តសុខាភិបាល, ស.វ.ស., UNGEGN: Sakâlôvĭtyéaloăy Vĭtyéasastr Sŏkhaphĭbal, S.V.S.; French: Université des sciences de la santé, USS) is a public university offering degrees in health sciences (medicine, pharmacy, dentistry, nursing, public health, etc.) in Phnom Penh, Cambodia.

University of Health Sciences

== History ==
The University of Health Sciences was first established in June 1946 as the Royal School for Medical Officers, following which it became the Cambodian Royal School for Medicine in 1953, and the Faculty of Medicine and Pharmacy in 1962. In 1967, the Faculty of Pharmacy was moved to Royal Khmer University, now known as Royal University of Phnom Penh.

In 1971, it became the Medical and Paramedical Faculty, in which a dentistry section was developed. It was totally abandoned and severely damaged throughout the genocidal regime of Pol Pot.

The university resumed its activities in January 1980 as the combined faculty of Medicine, Pharmacy and Dentistry, and it became the University of Health Sciences in 1997. In late 2001, the university became a public administrative institution comprising the Faculty of Medicine, the Faculty of Pharmacy, the Faculty of Dentistry, and the Technical School for Medical Care.

In addition to its primary mission to train in the field of human resources for health (sub- decree 127 of the Royal Government of Cambodia), the UHS is to become a multidisciplinary University by 2012, in accordance with the recommendations of government sub-decree 54.

== Faculty of Medicine ==
After 6 years of general medical education (a foundation year + 5 years), all students will graduate with Bachelor of Medical Sciences (BMedSc) (បរិញ្ញាបត្រវិទ្យាសាស្រ្តវេជ្ជសាស្ត្រ). This degree does not allow graduates to work independently as Physician, but it is possible for those who wish to continue to master's degrees in other fields relating to medical sciences such as Public Health, Epidemiology, Biomedical Science, Nutrition...

Medical graduates, who wish to be fully qualified as physicians or specialists must follow the rule as below:

- General Practitioner's (GP) course is of 8 years (BMedSc + 2-year internship). Clinical rotation in the internship is modulated within 4 main disciplines (general medicine, surgery, gynecology, pediatrics). The medical degree awarded is Doctor of Medicine (MD) (សញ្ញាបត្រវេជ្ជបណ្ឌិត) (equivalent to master's degree).
- After graduating with BMedSc; any students, who wish to enter Residency Training Programs, are required to sit for a rigorous Entrance Exam. The duration of residency programs lasts from 3 to 4 years after BMedSc (BMedSc + 3– 4 years of specialization) to the award of D.E.S. (Diplôme d'Etudes Spécialisées). The graduates, after a successful defense of their practicum thesis, are officially awarded the Degree of Specialized Doctor (MD-with specialization) (សញ្ញាបត្រវេជ្ជបណ្ឌិតឯកទេស) "Professional Doctorate".

All Medical graduates must complete Thesis Defense and pass the National Exit Exam (ប្រឡងចេញថ្នាក់ជាតិក្នុងវិស័យសុខាភិបាល) to become either GPs or Medical or Surgical Specialists.

- Medical Specialties:
  - Internal Medicine (Nephrology, Neurology, Infectious Diseases...)
  - Cardiology
  - Oncology
  - Pneumology
  - Endocrinology
  - Pediatrics
  - Anesthesia, Reanimation and Emergency Medicine
  - Radiology and Medical Imaging
  - Psychiatry
  - Dermatology
  - Anatomo-Pathology
  - Hepato-Gastro-Enterology
- Surgical Specialties:
  - General and Digestive Surgery
  - Neuro-Surgery
  - Urology
  - Traumatology and Orthopedics
  - Gynecology and Obstetrics
  - ENT and Maxillofacial Surgery
  - Ophthalmology
  - Pediatric Surgery
  - Plastic Surgery and Reconstructive

== Faculty of Pharmacy ==
The faculty of Pharmacy offers 5 year undergraduate program (a year foundation study plus 4 year of pharmaceutical sciences) leading to Bachelor of Pharmacy (BPharm) (បរិញ្ញាបត្រឱសថសាស្ត្រ) superseded the old title of "Diploma of Pharmacist".

After finishing the undergraduate curriculum, all graduates are required to sit for the National Licensing Exam to become Certified Pharmacist (ឱសថការី).

Postgraduate degrees are available through a contesting Entrance Exam. The degrees consist of:

- Master of Science (MSc; Biomedical or Pharmaceutical) (បរិញ្ញាបត្រជាន់ខ្ពស់វិទ្យាសាស្រ្ត; ជីវវេជ្ជសាស្រ្ត ឬឱសថ) last for 2 years.
- Doctor of Pharmacy (PharmD) (ឱសថបណ្ឌិត) "specialized" with a minimum duration of 3 years.
- Doctor of Philosophy (PhD) (បណ្ឌិតវិទ្យាសាស្រ្ត) for those who wishes to involve in advanced research and academic career, the school offers chances by cooperating with foreign universities (especially from France, Belgium), the candidate can apply for the abroad in related field such as pharmaceutical or biomedical science.

== Faculty of Dentistry ==
It takes 7 years to complete dental curriculum to get the degree of Doctor of Dental Surgery (DDS) (សញ្ញាបត្រទន្តបណ្ឌិត).

At the end of year 5 (a foundation year + 4 years), all dental students will graduate with Bachelor of Dental Sciences (BDentSc) (បរិញ្ញាបត្រវិទ្យាសាស្រ្តទន្តវទនសាស្រ្ត); However this degree does not allow those graduate to become fully qualified Dentist.

The DentSc is the bridge for dental students to go further for 2 years of internship. After completing 7 years dental education, the graduates must sit for the National Licensing Exam and defense thesis to become Doctor of Dental Surgery (equivalent to master's degree).

For specialization, the school run a program with technical support from foreign universities (Australia, Japan). The current specialty training degree is eligible only for DDS holders, this program is called "Master of Dental Sciences in Orthodontic (MDentSc)" (បរិញ្ញាបត្រជាន់ខ្ពស់ផែ្នកអ័កតូឌុងទីក) which last for 4 years of combined lectures and practicum.

== Technical School for Medical Care ==
The school consists of the training of Nurses, Midwives, Radiation Technicians, Medical Laboratory Technicians, Physiotherapists. There 2 main categories of degrees offered at the TSMC including:

- Professional Diplomas of related fields (equivalent to Associate degrees) with duration of 3 years of study. ឧ: សញ្ញាប័ត្រ គិលានុបដ្ឋាកមធ្យម, សញ្ញាប័ត្រ ឆ្មបមធ្យម, បរិញ្ញាប័ត្ររង មន្ទីពិសេាធន៍, បរិញ្ញាប័ត្ររង បច្ចេកទេសវិទ្យុសាស្រ្ត, បរិញ្ញាប័ត្ររង ព្យាបាលដោយចលនា
- Bachelor's degrees : Bachelor of Nursing (BSN). បរិញ្ញាប័ត្រ គិលានុបដ្ឋាក, and Bachelor of Midwifery (BMidW) បរិញ្ញាប័ត្រ ឆ្មប for 4 years of curriculum.
- There is also alternative way for those who already got a "Diploma of Nursing" "សញ្ញាប័ត្រ គិលានុបដ្ឋាកមធ្យម" who wish to get a "BSN" "បរិញ្ញាប័ត្រ គិលានុបដ្ឋាក" or "BMidW" "បរិញ្ញាប័ត្រ ឆ្មប". The requirement is to do more educational scheme for 12 months.
- There is also alternative way for those who already got a "Professional Diplomas (Associate's degree) of Medical Laboratory Technology " "បរិញ្ញាប័ត្ររង មន្ទីពិសេាធន៍" who wish to get a "The Bridging Bachelor in Medical Laboratory Technology (BBL)" "បរិញ្ញាប័ត្រ មន្ទីពិសេាធន៍". The requirement is to do more educational scheme for 2 years.
- Loading... Master of Medical Laboratory Science (MLS-2years) and The Professional Doctorate of Clinical Laboratory Sciences (DCLS-3years) programs curriculum will be soon accomplished.

== Other degrees in Health Sciences ==
The UHSC open a new degree in Public Health in academic year 2013-2014: The program will lead to confer Bachelor of Public Health (BPH). បរិញ្ញាប័ត្រ សុខភាពសាធារណះ.

The university plans to open more degrees related to health sciences in the near future such as Nutrition, Epidemiology... etc.

The UHSC have a strong cooperation with the School of Public Health (SPH) of the National Institute of Public Health (NIPH). The SPH started to offer master's programs relating to health sciences since 2007. The degrees available at SPH are:

- Master of Public Health (MPH) បរិញ្ញាប័ត្រជាន់ខ្ពស់ សុខភាពសាធារណះ (with option of "Disease Control and Prevention" or "Health system development")
- Master of Science (MSc) in Epidemiology or in Nutrition. បរិញ្ញាប័ត្រជាន់ខ្ពស់ វិទ្យាសាស្រ្ត
- Master of Hospital Administration (MHA) បរិញ្ញាប័ត្រជាន់ខ្ពស់ រដ្ឋបាលមន្ទីរពេទ្យ (planned to open in academic year 2014–2015).
- Master of Health Professions Education (MHPEd) បរិញ្ញាប័ត្រជាន់ខ្ពស់ អប់រំវិជ្ជាជីវះសុខាភិបាល which is currently available only for university staffs and this program is supervised by the University of the Philippines Manila.

== Affiliated Hospitals and National Centers ==
The UHS-C has 6 affiliated university-hospitals and 4 national centers for giving places to medical students for clinical clerkship, internship and residency training.

- Calmette Hospital
- Khmer-Soviet Friendship Hospital (KSFH)
- The National Center for Mother and Child Protection (NCMCP)
- National Pediatric Hospital
- Group of Kuntha Bopha Hospitals: consist of 4 hospitals in Phnom Penh and 1 in Siem Reap.
- Preah Kossamak Hospital
- Ang Doung Hospital (Eye, ENT)
- Kean Khleang Rehabitation, Dermatology and Leprosy Clinic
- The National Center for Tuberculosis and Leprosy Control
- The National Center for HIV/AIDS, Dermatology and STD
- The National Center for Parasitology, Entomology and Malaria Control

== See also ==
- Ministry of Health, Cambodia
- Ministry of Education, Youth and Sport, Cambodia.
- The National Institute of Public Health, Cambodia.
