= Ministry of Posts and Telecommunications (Cambodia) =

Government ministry of Cambodia

- ក្រសួងប្រៃសណីយ៍ និងទូរគមនាគមន៍

Agency overview
- Jurisdiction: Government of Cambodia
- Headquarters: 13 Monivong Blvd, Phnom Penh, Cambodia 12201
- Minister responsible: Chea Vandet, Minister of Posts and Telecommunications
- Website: mptc.gov.kh

The Ministry of Posts and Telecommunications (Khmer: ក្រសួងប្រៃសណីយ៍ និងទូរគមនាគមន៍) is the government ministry that governs the postal system and the telecommunications systems of Cambodia. The ministry maintains offices in Phnom Penh.

Telecom Cambodia and Camnet Internet Service, the country's principal telecom operator and internet service provider, function under the jurisdiction of the Ministry.

The main office is situated at the former site of the Roman Catholic Cathedral of Phnom Penh, destroyed by the Khmer Rouge in 1975.

== Departments ==
Administrative departments of the Ministry include:

- Posts Department
- International Telecom Department
- Domestic Telecom Department
- Inspection Department
- Finance and Plan Department
- Frequency Management and Licensing Department

== See also ==
- Communications in Cambodia
- Government of Cambodia
- SEATEL Cambodia
