= Health in Cambodia =

Life expectancy in Cambodia

The quality of health in Cambodia is rising along with its growing economy. The public health care system has a high priority from the Cambodian government and with international help and assistance, Cambodia has seen some major and continuous improvements in the health profile of its population since the 1980s, with a steadily rising life expectancy.

A health reform of Cambodia in the 1990s, successfully improved the health of the population in Cambodia, placing Cambodia on a track to achieve the Millennium Development Goal targets set forth by the United Nations. One such example is the Cambodian Health Equity Fund, largely financed by the country itself, created in 2000 to increase access to free health care to around 3 million poor people. The Fund, which pays for traveling expense and even daily allowance for anyone accompanying a patient, has resulted in increasing health care seeking among Cambodians who otherwise could not afford any kind of medical care. As a result of the reform, mortality rates significantly dropped. Similarly, life expectancy at birth in 2010 was 62.5 years, a 1.6 folds increase from 1980.

The Cambodian population and healthcare system struggles with many of the diseases common to the Tropics, in particular in rural areas. In addition, malnutrition of children has long been a major problem. HIV became an increasing problem in 1998, but the epidemic has since been almost curbed.

The Human Rights Measurement Initiative finds that Cambodia is fulfilling 81.2% of what it should be fulfilling for the right to health based on its level of income. When looking at the right to health with respect to children, Cambodia achieves 96.8% of what is expected based on its current income. In regards to the right to health amongst the adult population, the country achieves only 89.7% of what is expected based on the nation's level of income. Cambodia falls into the "very bad" category when evaluating the right to reproductive health because the nation is fulfilling only 57.1% of what the nation is expected to achieve based on the resources (income) it has available.

== Background ==
Cambodia gained its independence from France in 1953, but the road to self-governance would prove to be very difficult. In 1967, the Cambodian Civil War broke out and the following decade turned out disastrous for the country and the Cambodian people. The Vietnam War spread across the border and the US initiated massive bombing campaigns in Cambodia, which further aggravated the civil war and destroyed infrastructure and agricultural resources in the entire eastern half of the country, in particular the rural areas. In 1970, a coup d’état, supported by the United States, brought down the Cambodian government of King Norodom Sihanouk, and the Khmer Republic, an unstable military republican regime, was installed. As the civil war progressed, the regime was eventually overthrown by the Khmer Rouge in 1975 and in the aftermath, an internal genocide began, further destroying the economy and the capital city, massacred intellectuals, and crumbled the country apart, resulting in the deaths of around 1.7 million people (21% of the population) in total. The Khmer Rouge came to a demise in 1989, and the United Nations took over and sponsored a national election that supported numerous developmental agencies and nongovernmental organizations (NGOs) to come into Cambodia, which helped in the rebuilding of the country.

Cambodia is officially no longer a country of military conflict, as it has experienced a period of relative political stability in response to the 1998 election. During the newfound political stability, the country has experienced significant and consistent economic growth, but from a very deprived foundation. To be specific, Cambodia experienced a gross domestic product (GDP) increase of more than 7% per year. As of 2012, Cambodia has reached GDP per capita of US$944, right on the verge of achieving the threshold for lower middle-income country status of US$1035. Although the economy has been growing, the gains have not been equally distributed. Most of the income gain has been distributed exclusively to the urban population.

=== Health care inequality ===
Inequality in health care persists between people of different socioeconomic backgrounds, most prominently contrasted between the rural and urban population. According to the CDHS data in 2010, the rate of children under 5 with moderate to severe malnutrition or with acute respiratory infection was more than twice as high in children living in rural areas compared to those living in urban areas, as well as children in lowest quintile household compared to those in highest quantile household. There are many social stratifications, such as wealth, education level, and living location, that influence inequality among access to health care services. An in-depth study by The Centre for Advanced Studies was done in four poor communities of Phnom Penh Cambodia which resulted in the conclusion that more specifically, a females lack of general education is the leading cause to low levels of health systems being utilized by women. Due to a woman lacking education, they lack the knowledge that services to benefit their health are even available to them, creating this health care inequality.

=== Dual burden of disease ===
Dual burden of disease refers to the prevalence of both infectious and chronic disease in each population, mainly due to shifts in diet and physical activity pattern in response to globalization, especially in the low and middle income countries. Currently, rate of non-communicable diseases occurring in Cambodia has been rising, and mortality due to non-communicable increasingly matching up with the number of death due to infectious disease. Such dual burden/epidemiological transition from infectious to chronic disease burden has been identified, as the burden death due to infectious disease has shifted towards deaths due to injuries and chronic diseases, bush as cardiovascular disease, cancers, and respiratory diseases. Malnutrition remains to be a major risk factor for children's health. Childhood stunting, wasting, and underweight due to malnutrition remains to be a problem in Cambodia. Mortality data suggests emerging burdens specifically from injuries (traffic accidents), high blood pressure, heart disease, and liver cancer.

=== Life expectancy ===
Average life expectancy at birth was determined to be about 71.4 years in 2012. Specifically, the average life expectancy for females has been 74.2 years, and the average for males has been 68.8 years. This is a significant, more than two times longevity increase from only 29.6 years in 1980.

Period	Life expectancy in Years	Period	Life expectancy in Years
1950–1955	40.3	1985–1990	52.0
1955–1960	41.1	1990–1995	54.3
1960–1965	41.4	1995–2000	56.4
1965–1970	42.0	2000–2005	60.8
1970–1975	37.8	2005–2010	65.1
1975–1980	14.5	2010–2015	67.6
1980–1985	45.1		

Source: UN World Population Prospects

== Common health problems ==
=== Infectious diseases ===
Major infectious diseases includes food and waterborne diseases (of which there is a very high risk) such as bacterial and protozoal diarrhoea, hepatitis A, and typhoid fever. Vector borne diseases include dengue fever, Japanese encephalitis, and malaria.

Cambodia has been certified as being polio free since October 2000.

==== Tuberculosis ====
Tuberculosis incidence and prevalence declined significantly, and within just 20 years from 1990 to 2010, the incidence rate declined by 25%, and the prevalence rate declined by 48%. Efforts through active screening, such as outreach activities conducted by the National Centre for Tuberculosis and Leprosy Control, and introduction of directly observed treatment short course (DOTS) in 1990s drastically reduced burdens due to TB in Cambodia.

==== Malaria ====
Significant progress has been achieved in malaria prevention and control in Cambodia in the last decade. Since 2009, malaria incidence, cases, and deaths have all decreased. Despite the successes, malaria remains a major public health concern. Challenges to reaching national elimination goals include mobile populations and artemisinin resistance. Mobile populations are a challenge because malaria predominantly affects adult males who move from low to high transmission areas and lack access to malaria services and education, making them more vulnerable to infection. Artemisinin drugs are the first-line treatment for malaria throughout the Greater Mekong Subregion. Plasmodium falciparum resistance to artemisinin drugs was first confirmed in western Cambodia; treatment failures to artemisinin-based combination therapy (ACT) have been reported from multiple sites on the Thailand-Cambodia border. Currently five ACTs are failing in Cambodia.

In 2014, Malaria Elimination in the Greater Mekong Subregion countries was developed as a coordinated strategy for malaria elimination by 2030. As a result, the Cambodian National Malaria Program updated its national strategic plan to the Malaria Elimination Action Framework 2016-2020 which has the ultimate goal of national elimination of P. falciparum and multi-drug resistant malaria by 2020. In 2016, Cambodia moved from control to elimination activities concentrated in 18 operational districts in the northwest of Cambodia. The following surveillance activities were intensified in the 18 districts: following up on cases, investigating focal areas, and conducting response interventions. The National Malaria Program aimed to develop evidence-based approaches that could be scaled up to these 18 operational districts targeting elimination.

==== Dengue fever ====
Dengue fever is especially prevalent among children in between 4 and 6 years old, living in urban Cambodia. Dengue fever was first isolated in Cambodia in 1963. Since the beginning of passive surveillance in 1980, the case fatality rate has decreased from 15% to 0.3% from 1980 to 2010.

==== HIV/AIDS ====
HIV emerged as a major infection affecting the lives of approximately 2.4% of the population in 1998. Major public health work has been done to reduce the prevalence rate through implementing education and promoting safe sex via condom use targeted to specific population groups who are at the core of the infection web, including commercial sex workers, injecting drugs users, men who have sex with men. Some of the interventions implemented include awareness of safer sex and condom use campaign, universal access to HIV testing, and prophylaxis to HIV positive mothers to reduce mother-to-child transmission of the virus.

Cambodia's HIV/AIDS epidemic is spread primarily through heterosexual transmission and revolves largely around the sex trade. HIV transmission occurs mainly in sexual partnerships where one partner has engaged in high-risk behaviors. Women constitute a growing share of people living with HIV/AIDS, comprising an estimated 47 percent of people living with HIV/AIDS in 2003, compared with 37 percent in 1998.

This increased proportion of infections among women may reflect declining prevalence rates among males, as well as deaths among males infected in the early years of Cambodia's epidemic. Significantly, a low prevalence rate in the general population masks far higher prevalence rates in certain sub-populations, such as injecting drug users, people in prostitution, men who have sex with men, karaoke hostesses and beer girls, and mobile and migrant populations.

By 2014, HIV prevalence was reduced to 0.4 percent through a successful prevention program. However, in 2015 a localized, yet massive, outbreak of HIV stemming mostly from Roka occurred. The cause is thought to be the reuse of syringes by an unlicensed doctor who has since been jailed operating in the region.

=== Mental health ===
Cambodia is still psychologically struggling with the painful legacy of the Khmer Rouge era. At the same time, the people must cope with challenges like poverty, unemployment, political tensions and climate change. The health-care system is still ill-prepared to deal with mental-health problems. One NGO is standing out in providing mental-health services: the Transcultural Psychosocial Organisation (TPO) Cambodia.

=== Chronic diseases ===
==== Diabetes ====
A survey from MOH, done in 2010, indicated that 2.9% of population among adults aged 25 – 64 years had diagnosed diabetes.

==== Hypertension ====
Similar, 11.2% of the population among adults aged 25 – 64 years self-identified as having been diagnosed as having high blood pressure.

=== Injury ===
Since 1996, reported incidences of death due to injury have increased drastically in corollary to increasing number of vehicles. According to the health data from MOH, being male and being a motorcycle rider contributed most significantly to the burden, accounting for 80% and 67% of all mortalities due to injuries in 2010, respectively.

=== Maternal and child healthcare ===
The 2015 maternal mortality rate per 100,000 births for Cambodia is 161. This is compared with 290 in 2010, 265.8 in 2008, and 409.1 in 1990. The under 5 mortality rate, per 1,000 births is 90 and the neonatal mortality as a percentage of under 5's mortality is 34. In Cambodia the number of midwives per 1,000 live births is 6 and the lifetime risk of death for pregnant women 1 in 110. Prematurity, pneumonia, birth asphyxia, diarrhea, and injuries remain the top 5 killers of children under 5 years of age in Cambodia. Notably, the rate of diarrheal disease and measles decreased significantly in response to high vaccination coverage campaign set forth by the Ministry of Health.

== Public health in Cambodia ==
Unsafe drinking water and lack of sanitation facilities are major risk factors of infectious disease, especially diarrhea. However, such sanitary conditions have been improving since the 1990s along with the improvements of the economy and governance of the nation. Specifically, in 2010, it was estimated by the WHO that around 64% of households were able to receive safe drinking water, with urban counterparts of the country receiving higher rates (87%) of improved water than the rural counterpart (58%).

=== Organizations and governance ===
Ministry of Health (MOH): Ministry of Health in Cambodia has been taking the leading role in improving the health of the people in Cambodia since the 1990s when help from foreign NGOs and external government aids were welcomed in Cambodia after the establishment of relative political stability. Thanks to the MOH, public health administration governance has been centralized and organized so that decisions and actions are facilitated to act quickly and critically in response to public health problems. Specifically, the MOH follows the current Health Strategic Plan 2008-2015 to better the health of the nation.

=== Governmental subsidies ===
Under the supervision of Cambodian Ministry of Health, governmental health facilities are reimbursed for treatment of low-income patients. In 2012, it was estimated that subsidies were given to around 25,000 inpatients and outpatients, with a total expenditure of US$285,000. However, such governmental infrastructure is not available in rural provinces: NGOs take bigger roles in the rural healthcare setting in Cambodia.

== Regional: Ratanakiri ==
Health indicators in Ratanakiri are the worst in Cambodia. Malaria, tuberculosis, intestinal parasites, cholera, diarrhea, and vaccine-preventable diseases such as measles are endemic. Rattanakiri has Cambodia's highest rates of maternal and child mortality, with 22.9% of children dying before the age of five. Ratanakiri also has the country's highest rates of severe malnutrition.

Ratanakiri residents' poor health can be attributed to a variety of factors, including poverty, physical remoteness, language and cultural barriers that prevent Khmer Loeu from obtaining medical care, poor infrastructure and access to water, lack of accountability in the medical community, and exacerbating environmental factors such as natural resource degradation, decreasing food production, and internal migration. The province has one referral hospital, 10 health centers, and 17 health posts. Medical equipment and supplies are minimal, and most health facilities are staffed by nurses or midwives, who are often poorly trained and irregularly paid.

=== Statistics ===
Note: These statistics are aggregated for both Ratanakiri and Mondulkiri provinces.

Vaccinations

- DPT1: 44%
- DPT2: 24%
- DPT3: 19%
- Measles: 39%

Nutrition

- Children moderately underweight: 35%
- Children severely underweight: 19%

Access to health care

- Visited health facility in last year: 13%

Sexual health

- Age at first intercourse: 18.0
- Age at First Marriage: 18.6
- Knows that a healthy person can have AIDS: 78%
- Knows that condoms can be used to prevent AIDS: 33%
- Uses any method of birth control: 8%
- Uses condoms: 1%
- Uses modern method of birth control: 7%
- Delivery Assistance by Doctor: 1%
- Delivery Assistance by SBA: 14%

== See also ==
- Ministry of Health, Cambodia
- Traditional Cambodian medicine
- National Malaria Center of Cambodia
- Cambodian Red Cross
- Institute Pasteur du Cambodge

== Sources and further reading ==
- J. Ovesen and I. Trankell (2010). Cambodians and Their Doctors (PDF). NIAS Press.
