= List of defunct airlines of Cambodia =

This is a list of defunct airlines of Cambodia.

Airline	Image	IATA	ICAO	Callsign	Commenced operations	Ceased operations	Notes
Air Cambodge		VJ	RAC	AIR CAMBODGE	1970	2001	Founded as Royal Air Cambodge
Air Dream		AD	ADA		2007	2007	
Angkor Airways		G6	AKW	ANGKORWAYS	2004	2008	
Angkor Wat Airlines					1973	1974	
Apsara International Air		IP	AQQ	APSARA	2014	2016	
Bassaka Air		5B	BSX	BASSAKA	2014	2020	
Cambodair					1973	1974	
Cambodia Airlines		Y6	CCL	ANGKOR WAT	1997	2014	Operations ceased in 2005, but resurrected in 2013
Cambodia Bayon Airlines		BD	BYC	BAYON AIR	2007	2019	
Cambodia International Airlines		XE		CIA	1992	1994	grounded, and then threatened with court action
First Cambodia Airlines		F6	FCC	FIRSTCAMBODIA	2004	2004	
Imtrec Aviation			IMT		2000	2008	
JC International Airlines	XU-998 (26632656499)	QD	JCC	CAMBO	2016	2023	
Kampuchea Airlines		E2	KMP	KAMPUCHEA	1997	2004	
KC International Airlines		3Q	KCH		2017	2019	
Khmer Akas					1970	1973	Renamed/merged to Khmer Airlines
Khmer Airlines					1973	1975	
Khmer Hansa Airlines					1971	1975	
Lanmei Airlines		LQ	MKR	AIR LANME	2016	2024	
Mekong Airlines		M8	MKN	MEKONG AIRLINES	2003	2003	
PMTair		U4	PMT	MULTITRADE	2003	2008	
President Airlines		TO	PSD		1997	2007	
Royal Air Cambodge		VJ	RAC	AIR CAMBODGE	1956	2001	was Air Cambodge from 1970-1994
Royal Khmer Airlines		FE	RKH	KHMER AIR	2004	2007	
Royal Phnom Penh Airways		RL	PPW		2000	2004	
Siem Reap Airways International		FT	SRH	SIEMREAP AIR	2000	2008	
Skywings Asia Airlines		ZA	SWM		2011	2014	Rebranded as Sky Angkor Airlines
Small Planet Airlines		C8	LKH	SKYPLANET	2017	2018	
TonleSap Airlines		K9	TSP	TONLESAP AIR	2011	2013	Rebranded as Wat Phnom Airlines
Transair Cambodia		6H			1992	1993	
Wat Phnom Airlines		WD	WPH	WAT PHNOM	2013	2014	
Yana Airlines		M8	CYG		1998	2002	Rebranded as Mekong Airlines
