= PMTair Flight 241 =

2007 aviation accident

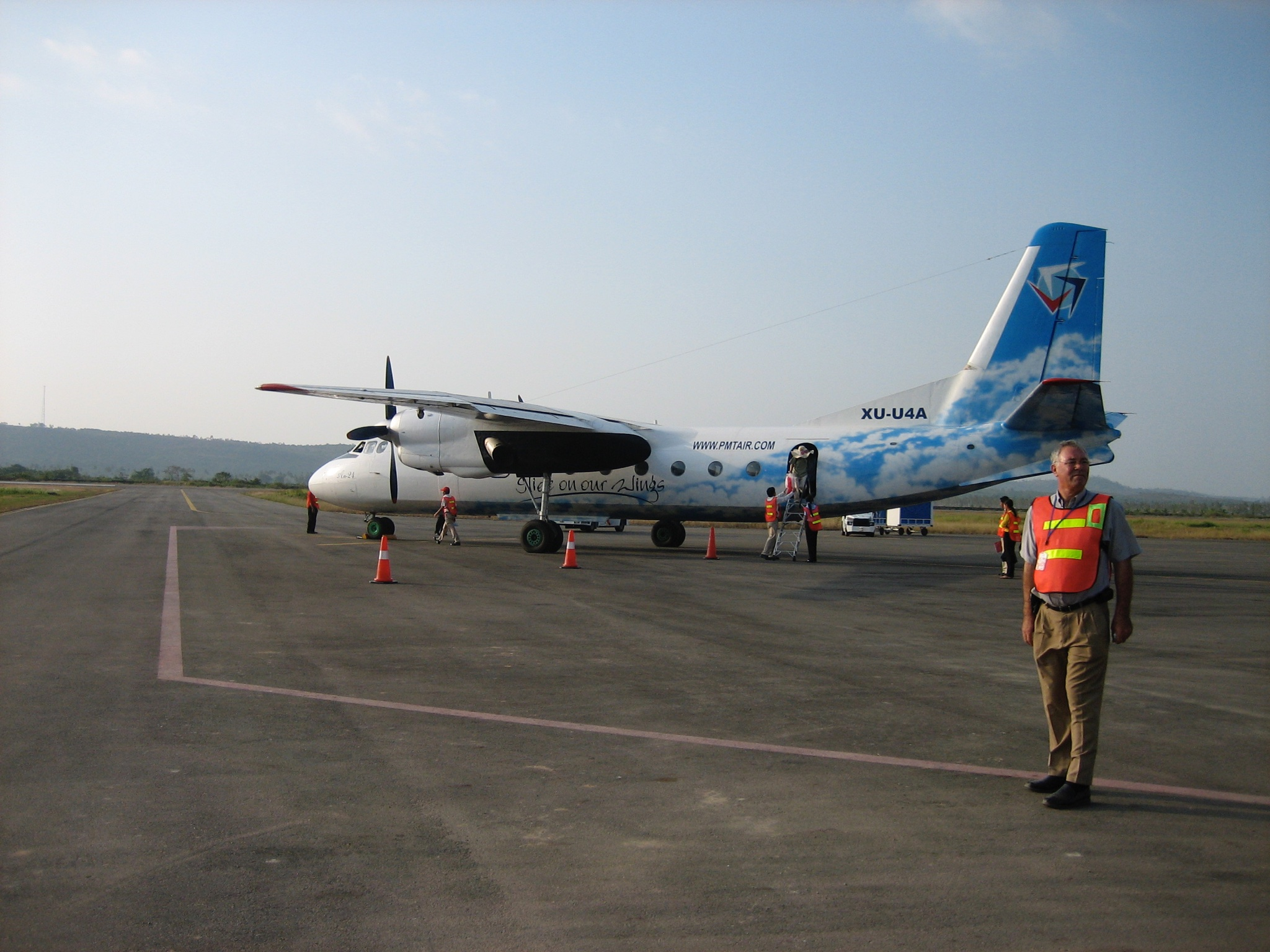
- XU-U4A, the aircraft involved in January 2007

Accident
- Date: 25 June 2007
- Summary: Crashed into mountainous terrain during approach
- Site: Phnom Damrey Mountain, Kampot Province, Cambodia; 10°51′1.25″N 103°55′34.9″E

Aircraft
- Aircraft type: Antonov An-24B
- Operator: PMTair
- IATA flight No.: U4241
- ICAO flight No.: PMT241
- Call sign: MULTITRADE 241
- Registration: XU-U4A
- Flight origin: Siem Reap International Airport, Siem Reap, Cambodia
- Destination: Sihanoukville International Airport, Sihanoukville, Cambodia
- Occupants: 22
- Passengers: 18
- Crew: 4
- Fatalities: 22
- Survivors: 0

Progress Multi Trade Air Flight 241 was a scheduled domestic passenger flight from Siem Reap to Sihanoukville, Cambodia. The flight was operated by regional airliner PMTair using an Antonov An-24. On 25 June 2007, the Antonov An-24, registered as XU-U4A, disappeared over the Cambodian jungle near Bokor Mountain in Kampot while on approach to Sihanoukville. A massive search and rescue operation ensued with thousands of soldiers and police scoured the area. The aircraft was found to have crashed in southwestern Cambodia, northeast of Dâmrei Mountains. All 22 people on board, most of whom were South Korean tourists, were killed. It remains the deadliest air disaster in Cambodian history since 1997.

An investigation was completed in March 2008. The investigation concluded that the crash had been caused by several factors, including the pilots' decision to continue their flight beyond their designated flight route, their decision to continue the descent in inclement weather condition, and poor management from PMTAir. Director of Flight Directors for Cambodian State Secretariat of Civil Aviation, Kao Sivoeun, however, stated that investigators could not determine whether the airline or the pilots were the ones to blame.

== Background ==
The aircraft was making a domestic passenger flight from Siem Reap International Airport in Siem Reap to Sihanoukville International Airport in Sihanoukville, Cambodia. Siem Reap was the main tourist hubs city to Sihanoukville in Cambodia. On the other hand, Sihanoukville was one of the most popular tourist destination in the country. Sihanoukville is famous for its beaches, while Siem Reap is site of the famed Angkor Wat temple complex.

Tourism industry in Cambodia has improved, and most of the tourists were from South Korea. According to Cambodia's Tourism Ministry, South Korea had the highest number of tourists visiting Cambodia in 2006. Around 221,000 South Koreans were among 2006's total of 1.7 million foreign visitors. The airline, PMTair, was a small Cambodian airline that began flying from Siem Reap to Sihanoukville in January 2007, a new route to spur the country's burgeoning tourism industry, which had been decimated due to the country's prolonged civil war. According to PMTAir's website, the airline has six roundtrip flights a week between Siem Reap and Incheon and Busan.

== Aircraft ==
The aircraft was an Antonov An-24B, manufactured in Ulan-Ude, Russia in 1969 with a manufacturer serial number of 99901908. It was owned and operated by PMTair. As of 25 June, the aircraft had accumulated a flying cycles of more than 25,000 cycles. It was equipped with two AI-24 turboprop engines. There were no recorded technical defects prior to the aircraft's accident flight.

== Passengers and crew ==
Nationality	Passengers	Crew	Total
South Korea	13	0	13
Cambodia	2	3	5
Czech Republic	3	0	3
Uzbekistan	0	1	1
Total	18	4	22

There were 22 people on board the aircraft, though reports could not agree on the total number of passengers and crews. News media reported a total of 18 passengers and 4 crew members, however the official investigation report stated that there were 4 crew members and 18 passengers on board, without a confirmation on their nationalities. Of the passengers, thirteen were South Koreans and the other three were from the Czech Republic. The Korean passengers were part of a tour group. The crew was made up of 3 flight crew and 1 cabin crew, consisting of an Uzbekistani pilot and a Cambodian co-pilot, a Cambodian flight engineer and a Cambodian flight attendant. The other flight attendants, all of whom were Cambodians, were listed as passengers.

The commander of Flight 241 was identified as 56-year old Nikolay Pavlenko and his co-pilot was identified as 42-year old Uth Chan Dara. During the flight, the co-pilot was the pilot flying. The flight engineer was identified as 43-year old Hean Chan Dara. Pavlenko was an Uzbekistan citizen and previously had undergone training in the USSR. He had accrued a total flying experience of 10,345 flight hours, of which more than 5,000 were on the Antonov An-24. Compared to Pavlenko, Co-pilot Dara was less experienced with a total flying experience of 3,520 flight hours.

== Flight ==
Flight 241 departed Siem Reap at 10:01 local time with 18 passengers and 4 crew members. Co-pilot Dara was the pilot flying while Captain Pavlenko was the pilot not flying. The crew had received weather information from air traffic controller earlier through phone. According to said information, there was cloud and rain north of Sihanoukville. The flight was later cleared to fly direct to Sihanoukville.

As the aircraft reached the mid-point of the route between Siem Reap and Sihanoukville, it started to deviate to the left of the track. The crew might have decided to deviate in response to the deteriorating weather condition along the route. Their decision to deviate, however, was not informed to the ATC. The controller in the ATC noticed that the aircraft had deviated to the left but decided not to question the crew on the matter.

At 10:36 local time, the crew requested the controllers in Sihanoukville about the general weather condition in the area. Afterwards, the crew requested the controllers from Phnom Penh Control Area to descend to 8,000 feet (2,400 m), which was later granted by the controller. The controller later handed over the contact of Flight 241 to Sihanoukville at 10:42 local time.

As they became nearer to their destination airport, the crew requested to descend to 3,000 feet (910 m). Sihanoukville cleared them to descend to 3,000 feet (910 m). At 10:46 local time, the aircraft descended below Phnom Penh's radar coverage and its blip disappeared from the screen. Radio communication with Sihanoukville was still normal.

At 10:47 local time, the crew requested to descend further to 2,000 feet (610 m). As Sihanoukville Airport was neither equipped with radar nor other navigational aids such as VOR, DME and ILS, the crew had to rely to visual ground observation. The controller asked the crew on whether they had established visual contact with the ground and the crew answered with "would see ground in a moment." They were then asked by the controller on whether they were facing difficulties during the descent, in which the crew answered with "That's ok, that's ok." The ATC then cleared the flight crew to descend to 2,000ft and the clearance was read back by the crew at 10:48. This was the last transmission from the crew.

== Search and rescue ==
Contact was lost with the aircraft at 10.50 local time, five minutes before it had been due to land. The aircraft went missing over the dense and mountainous Kampot's jungle. A search and rescue team was assembled by the authorities, involving more than thousands of soldiers and local police officers. The search and rescue efforts were hampered by rough terrain and adverse weather condition.

South Korean relatives that heard the news of the disappearance of the flight immediately flew from Incheon International Airport to Phnom Penh. They were later transported by a bus to a hotel in the region. South Korean embassy have also been informed about the disappearance. South Korean officials and diplomats were called to the airport to check the situation. Prime Minister of Cambodia, Hun Sen, stated that the government would reward a total of USD$5,000 for anyone who managed to find the crash site, later added that there was little hope of finding survivors among the 22 people.

On the second day of the search operation, several searchers in helicopters set out after a rain storm cleared, scouring a stretch of dense jungle and mountainous terrain, but returned with no further clues as to where the aircraft may be located. Prime Minister Hun Sen visited Kampot Town to discuss the search and rescue efforts with Cambodia's top military officials. He later asked for the United States to use its high-tech surveillance satellites to help search for the missing aircraft. The United States later joined the search and rescue effort of Flight 241. Later, the wreckage of Flight 241 was found on Phnom Damrey Mountain at an elevation of 2,700 feet (820 m), in upside down condition with bodies strewn around the wreckage. There were no survivors. Prime Minister Hun Sen then conducted a press conference in response to the discovery, and stated "This is a tragedy no one should have to experience."

== Investigation ==
Under the State Secretariat for Civil Aviation, the Aircraft Accident Investigation Committee was ordered to investigate the accident. The team would be assisted with the Russian Interstate Aviation Committee (IAC) for the read-out of the aircraft's flight recorders. Both flight recorders, however, were later declared as unusable as the IAC reported that both recorders didn't contain any data on the accident flight. The team could only rely on the ATC and radar recording of the accident flight.

The inspection on the crash site showed that there were two areas of wreckage. The majority of the aircraft's structures were located at the main wreckage site. Approximately 500 meters from the main wreckage were the aircraft's right hand wing and right hand stabilizer. The right wing was bent to 90° due to collision with trees. As per the result of the wreckage inspection, it could be concluded that the aircraft's right wing and stabilizer had hit trees first, losing the aircraft's lift and eventually caused it to crash 500 metres (1,600 ft; 550 yd) from the first point of impact in an inverted condition. Further inspection revealed that the aircraft didn't explode upon impact, as per the statement from the spokesman of Korean Ministry of Foreign Affairs and Trade Cho Hee-Yong. All of the bodies except one were located inside the aircraft.

The ATC recording didn't find any abnormalities on the communication between the controllers and the flight crew. However, investigators noted that the majority of the communication, including several critical parts, were carried out with the Khmer language rather than English, despite the fact that the commander of the flight was an Uzbek citizen who didn't understand Khmer. The investigation could not confirm on whether the co-pilot had informed or translated his communication with the tower to the commander as the cockpit voice recorder was unusable.

The radar recording showed that the flight indeed had deviated to the left of its designated track. This deviation was probably caused by the weather condition near Sihanoukville. Satellite data from the region showed that there was a wide coverage of clouds. The aircraft eventually entered clouds and this decreased the visibility of the surrounding environment. Investigators stated that the crew, who were confused on their actual position, decided to continue their descent despite the deteriorating weather condition. The aircraft eventually collided with trees and terrain approximately 27 nautical miles (50 km; 31 mi) from the airport.

In March 2008, Cambodian investigators completed their investigation on the crash of Flight 241. It stated three following factors as the cause of the crash: the crew's decision to fly the aircraft through a mountainous terrain despite their lack of awareness on their exact position and the surrounding terrain, the crew's decision to continue their descent despite the adverse weather condition, and the poor management of PMTair. The report couldn't determine the main cause of the accident, as they were not sure if PMTair or the pilot was to blame.

== Aftermath ==
Immediately after the crash, South Korean aviation authorities held safety inspections on PMTair and six other foreign airlines. The other six were Dalavia, Garuda Indonesia Airlines, Iran Air, Royal Khmer Airlines, Sakhalinsk Airlines and Vladivostok Air. Cambodian authorities later suspended all domestic flights of PMTAir. Flights were only allowed to resume after the release of the investigation report. The airline eventually ceased all operations in 2008.

In 2011, a Korean court ruled in favour of the lawsuits from 11 families of the victims and ordered PMTAir to pay compensations to the families with a total of KRW 3.2 billion.

== See also ==
- Trigana Air Service Flight 267
- Vietnam Airlines Flight 815
- Angara Airlines Flight 2311, another Antonov An-24 that crashed on approach to its destination.
