= PMTair =

Airline of Cambodia (2003–2008)

PMTAir
| IATA | ICAO | Call sign |
|---|---|---|
| U4 | PMT | MULTITRADE |
- Founded: 14 January 2003
- Ceased operations: 2008
- Hubs: Phnom Penh International Airport
- Focus cities: Siem Reap International Airport
- Fleet size: 7
- Destinations: 4 (at closure)
- Parent company: Progress Multitrade Co., Ltd.
- Headquarters: Phnom Penh, Cambodia
- Website: www.pmtair.com

PMTair (Progress Multi Trade Air) was a Cambodian airline offering regularly scheduled domestic and international passenger and cargo services out of Phnom Penh International Airport.

== History ==
PMTair was founded on 14 January 2003 and was owned by Progress Multitrade Co., Ltd. A certificate of airworthiness was issued by the Cambodian Civil Aviation Authority on 14 October 2003.

The airline was dissolved in 2008.

== Destinations ==
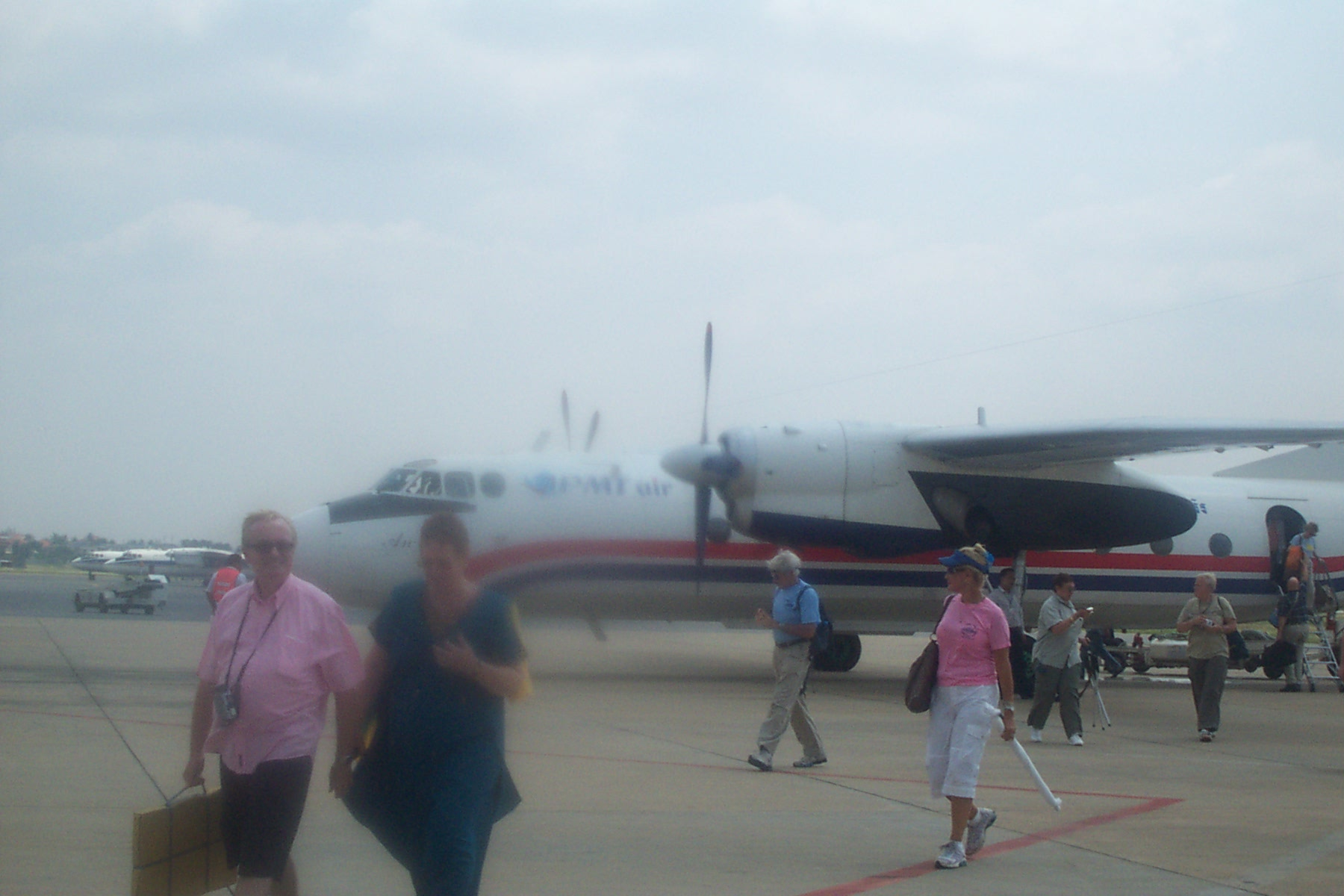
Passengers disembark from a PMTair Antonov An-24 at Phnom Penh International Airport in September 2006.

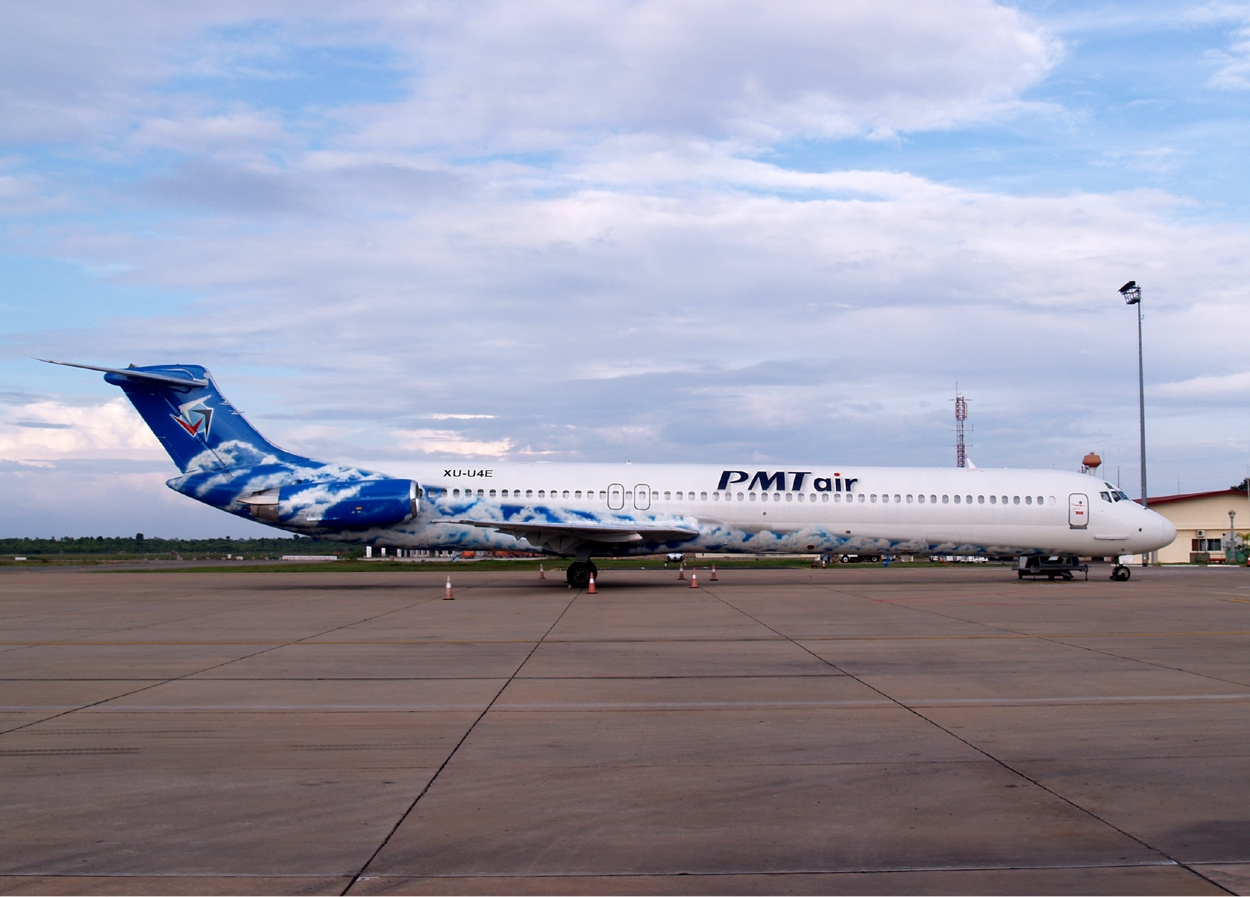
A PMTair McDonnell Douglas MD-83 at Siem Reap-Angkor International Airport, Cambodia in 2007.

During its five-year existence, PMTair served the following destinations:

- Cambodia
  - Phnom Penh – Phnom Penh International Airport – hub
  - Ratanakiri
  - Siem Reap – Siem Reap International Airport – focus city
  - Sihanoukville – Sihanouk International Airport
- South Korea
  - Busan – Gimhae International Airport
  - Seoul – Incheon International Airport
- Thailand
  - Bangkok
  - Pattaya – U-Tapao International Airport
- Vietnam
  - Hanoi – Noi Bai International Airport

== Fleet ==
The PMTair fleet included the following aircraft (as of 30 August 2008):

- 2 Antonov An-12 (cargo)
- 1 Antonov An-24
- 2 Boeing 737-200
- 2 McDonnell Douglas MD-83 (one aircraft is operated for Wind Rose Aviation)

== Accidents and incidents ==
- On November 21, 2005, a Yunshuji Y7-100C operated by PMTair left the runway when landing at Ban Lung, Ratanakiri and sheared a leg off its landing gear. Fifty-nine passengers and six crew members were aboard. There were no injuries. The aircraft was XU-072, leased from Royal Phnom Penh Airways, and formerly operated by President Airlines. As a result of this accident, United Nations personnel were barred from using the airline.
- On June 25, 2007, PMTair Flight 241, an Antonov An-24 with 16 passengers and six crew crashed in a mountainous jungle area of Kampot Province. The flight had departed Angkor International Airport and was heading for Sihanoukville International Airport, and disappeared from radar at around 10:40 a.m. local time (0340 UTC). Aboard were 13 South Koreans and three Czech passengers, and the crew of one Uzbekistani pilot and five Cambodians. Because of weather and rugged terrain, search-and-rescue crews took two days to find the crash site. No survivors were found.
