= Royal Air Philippines =

Airline of the Philippines

| IATA | ICAO | Call sign |
|---|---|---|
| RW | RYL | DOUBLE GOLD |
- Founded: August 22, 2002; 24 years ago (as Royal Air Charter Service)
- Commenced operations: December 14, 2018; 7 years ago (as Royal Air Philippines)
- Ceased operations: January 4, 2026 (passenger operations)
- AOC #: 2010024
- Fleet size: 4
- Destinations: 17
- Parent company: Lanmei Group
- Headquarters: Clark International Airport, Philippines
- Key people: Ed Novillas (CEO)
- Website: www.flyroyalair.com

Royal Air Charter Service, Inc., operating as Royal Air Philippines, is a Philippine-registered airline. The company was established on 22 August 2002, as a charter airline. It began operations as a low-cost carrier on 14 December 2018, with an inaugural flight from its hub in Clark, Pampanga, to Caticlan in Aklan.

The airline operates a pair of Airbus A321-200PCFs, providing domestic and international cargo services.

On 29 December 2025, it was announced that the airline would be discontinuing all scheduled passenger flights, effective 4 January 2026. No update regarding the continuity of its cargo operations was given.

== History ==
Royal Air Charter Service began its operations on 22 August 2002, as a charter airline. The airline began increasing its chartered domestic and international flights after it was granted the right to provide chartered air services through a Certificate of Public Convenience and Necessity (CPCN) issued by the Civil Aeronautics Board (CAB) in May 2017. On 21 June 2018, the airline began regular daily flights from Cebu to Macau using ex-SWISS BAe Avro RJ100 aircraft. On 27 July, the airline announced that it was working with the Philippines' Department of Tourism to establish a regular daily charter service between Macau and Subic Bay.

On 26 July 2018, the CAB gave the airline the authority to operate as a commercial scheduled domestic and international flights. By September 2018, the company announced that it would commence daily domestic commercial operations from Clark International Airport in Pampanga on 12 November 2018, to five destinations, namely, Cebu, Caticlan in Aklan, Tagbilaran in Bohol and Puerto Princesa and San Vicente in Palawan. On 14 December 2018, the airline had its inaugural domestic commercial flight from Clark to Caticlan and back. The company further expanded its international charter service and domestic commercial operations after it was able to lease two Airbus A319 aircraft from Cambodian budget carrier Lanmei Airlines. The airline began offering charter flights from Cambodia and China to key Philippine cities such as Clark, Manila, Kalibo and Puerto Princesa. On 19 May 2019, the airline announced the opening of its Cebu hub and launched its inaugural Cebu to Davao flight, with four flights a week between the two cities.

On 18 August 2019, the airline began operating twice a week chartered flights between Macau, Cagayan North International Airport within the Cagayan Special Economic Zone in Lal-lo, Cagayan, and Clark. The company thus became the first airline to operate in the airport, which opened in 2016. However, on 31 January 2020, the airline temporarily ceased its Macau-Lal-lo flights after the COVID-19 pandemic began. The airline also suspended its charter flights between Wuhan and Kalibo on 23 January following the COVID-19 outbreak there.

On 6 January 2020, the airline added its first Airbus A320-200 to its fleet. The aircraft was previously in service with Lanmei Airlines and was leased from Minsheng Financial Leasing. The aircraft entered service with the airline on 9 January, with an inaugural flight from Manila to Sihanoukville in Cambodia.

In June 2023, all Royal Air Philippines Domestic flights transferred from Terminal 4 to Terminal 2 and all Royal Air Philippines International flights transferred to Terminal 1 of Ninoy Aquino International Airport (NAIA) as part of the Schedule and Terminal Assignment Rationalization (STAR) Program of the Manila International Airport Authority.

On 4 January 2026, the airline ceased all passenger operations, and at that time it was unclear if cargo operations would continue. As of 6 February 2026, according to the flight tracking service Flightradar24, the airline continues to operate cargo flights.

== Features and amenities ==
Royal Air Philippines passengers received 10 kg (22 lb) free check-in allowance on top of the 7 kg (15 lb) allowance on hand-carry items. The airline also offers in-flight entertainment through its Sapphire In-Flight Entertainment Platform, which is a partnership with Global JD Capital Pte Ltd. In August 2020, the airline announced a partnership with Sabre Corporation that enabled the airline to use Sabre distribution software in its ticketing systems.

== Destinations ==
As of March 2025, Royal Air Philippines flies (or has flown) to the following destinations:

| Country | City | Airport | Notes | Refs |
|---|---|---|---|---|
| Cambodia | Sihanoukville | Sihanouk International Airport | Terminated | |
| China | Beijing | Beijing Daxing International Airport | | |
| China | Chengdu | Chengdu Shuangliu International Airport | Terminated | |
| China | Chengdu | Chengdu Tianfu International Airport | | |
| China | Guangzhou | Guangzhou Baiyun International Airport | Terminated | |
| China | Haikou | Haikou Meilan International Airport | Terminated | |
| China | Kunming | Kunming Changshui International Airport | Terminated | |
| China | Nanjing | Nanjing Lukou International Airport | | |
| China | Nanning | Nanning Wuxu International Airport | | |
| China | Ningbo | Ningbo Lishe International Airport | | |
| China | Quanzhou | Quanzhou Jinjiang International Airport | Terminated | |
| China | Shanghai | Shanghai Pudong International Airport | | |
| China | Shenzhen | Shenzhen Bao'an International Airport | Terminated | |
| China | Wuhan | Wuhan Tianhe International Airport | Terminated | |
| China | Wuxi | Sunan Shuofang International Airport | | |
| China | Yichang | Yichang Sanxia Airport | | |
| China | Zhangjiajie | Zhangjiajie Hehua International Airport | Terminated | |
| China | Zhengzhou | Zhengzhou Xinzheng International Airport | Terminated | |
| China | Macau | Macau International Airport | | |
| Hong Kong | Hong Kong | Hong Kong International Airport | | |
| Philippines | Caticlan | Godofredo P. Ramos Airport | | |
| Philippines | Cebu | Mactan–Cebu International Airport | Terminated | |
| Philippines | Clark | Clark International Airport | Terminated | |
| Philippines | Davao | Francisco Bangoy International Airport | Terminated | |
| Philippines | Kalibo | Kalibo International Airport | | |
| Philippines | Lal-lo | Cagayan North International Airport | | |
| Philippines | Manila | Ninoy Aquino International Airport | | |
| Philippines | Puerto Princesa | Puerto Princesa International Airport | | |
| Philippines | Tagbilaran | Bohol–Panglao International Airport | | |
| South Korea | Busan | Gimhae International Airport | Terminated | |
| South Korea | Jeju | Jeju International Airport | Terminated | |
| South Korea | Muan | Muan International Airport | Terminated | |
| South Korea | Seoul | Incheon International Airport | Terminated | |
| Taiwan | Taichung | Taichung International Airport | Terminated | |
| Taiwan | Taipei | Taoyuan International Airport | | |
| Vietnam | Da Nang | Da Nang International Airport | | |
