= Royal Air Cambodge =

National airline of Cambodia (1956–2001)

Royal Air Cambodge Khmer: អាកាសចរណ៍ភូមិន្ទ កម្ពុជា
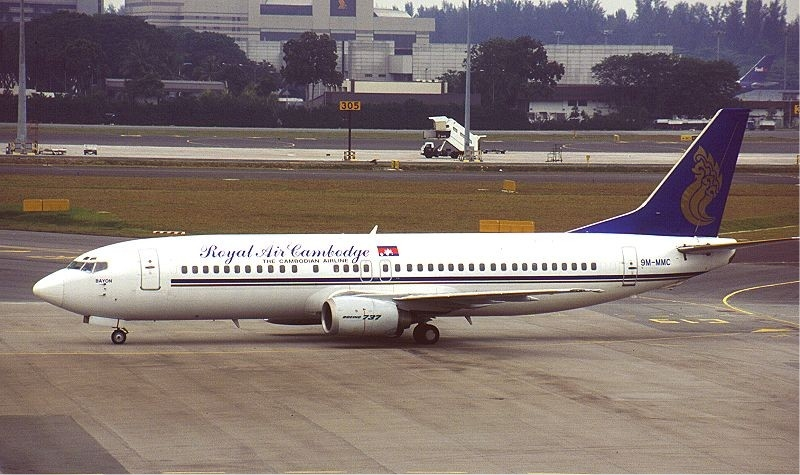
- Royal Air Cambodge Boeing 737-400 in 1999.
IATA	ICAO	Call sign
VJ	RAC	AIR CAMBODGE
- Founded: 1956
- Commenced operations: 1970 (as Air Cambodge); 1994 (as Royal Air Cambodge)
- Ceased operations: October 16, 2001
- Hubs: Phnom Penh International Airport
- Parent company: Government of Cambodia (51%)
- Website: www.royal-air-cambodge.net (Archive)

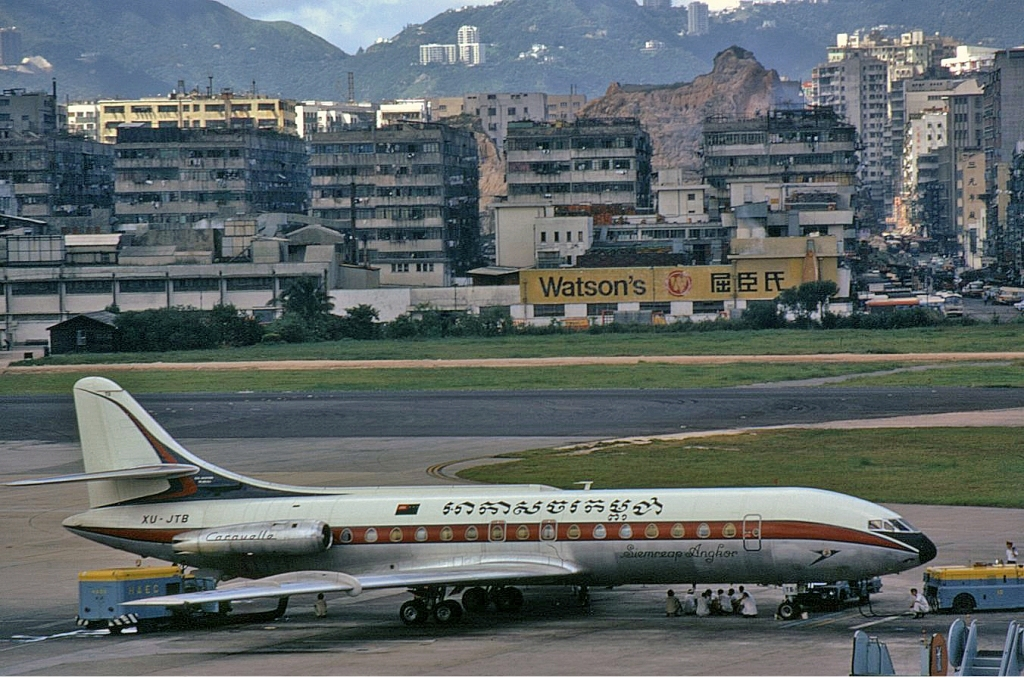
Air Cambodge Sud Aviation Caravelle III (XU-JTB) at Hong Kong's Kai Tak Airport in 1973.

Royal Air Cambodge (Khmer: អាកាសចរណ៍ភូមិន្ទ កម្ពុជា; known as 'Air Cambodge' (Khmer: អាកាសចរ កម្ពុជា) from 1970 to 1975) was the flag carrier airline of Cambodia, headquartered in Phnom Penh.

== History ==
The company was founded in 1956. After the establishment of the Khmer Republic in 1970, the airline was re-named 'Air Cambodge'. It was reformed, under the original name 'Royal Air Cambodge', after the restoration of the monarchy and democracy in the early 1990s and the recovery of the economy in 1994. The airline's partner was Malaysia Airlines and aircraft was leased from them. The enterprise however was loss-making, totaling over 30 million US dollars. The decision to close its business was made partly because of a decrease of passengers numbers in the wake of the September 11 terrorist attacks, which brought the whole aviation industry as a whole in deep crisis. Royal Air Cambodge had to shut down on 16 October 2001. The Cambodian government later joined with Vietnam Airlines to set up the new national flag carrier Cambodia Angkor Air in 2009.

== Former destinations ==
Royal Air Cambodge flew to the following destinations:

Country	City	Airport	Notes
Cambodia	Battambang	Battambang Airport	
Cambodia	Kratié	Kratié Airport	
Cambodia	Koh Kong	Koh Kong Airport	
Cambodia	Phnom Penh	Phnom Penh International Airport	Hub
Cambodia	Banlung	Ratanakiri Airport	
Cambodia	Siem Reap	Siem Reap International Airport	
Cambodia	Stung Treng	Stung Treng Airport	
China	Guangzhou	Guangzhou Baiyun International Airport	
Hong Kong	Hong Kong	Kai Tak Airport	Airport Closed
Hong Kong	Hong Kong	Hong Kong International Airport	
Malaysia	Kuala Lumpur	Subang International Airport	
Malaysia	Kuala Lumpur	Kuala Lumpur International Airport	
Malaysia	Kota Kinabalu	Kota Kinabalu International Airport	
Singapore	Singapore	Paya Lebar Airport	
Singapore	Singapore	Changi Airport	
Thailand	Bangkok	Don Mueang International Airport	
Vietnam	Ho Chi Minh City	Tan Son Nhat International Airport	

== Fleet ==
Royal Air Cambodge fleet informationHistory 1994-2001
Aircraft	In service	Passengers			Notes
Aircraft	In service	C	Y	Total	Notes
ATR 72-201	3	0	68	68	EX: Kampuchea Airlines
Boeing 737-200	1	0	112	112	XU-711
Boeing 737-400	3	16	128	144	All leased from Malaysia Airlines
Total	7				

== See also ==
- Air Vietnam
- Royal Air Lao
