= Royal Phnom Penh Airways =

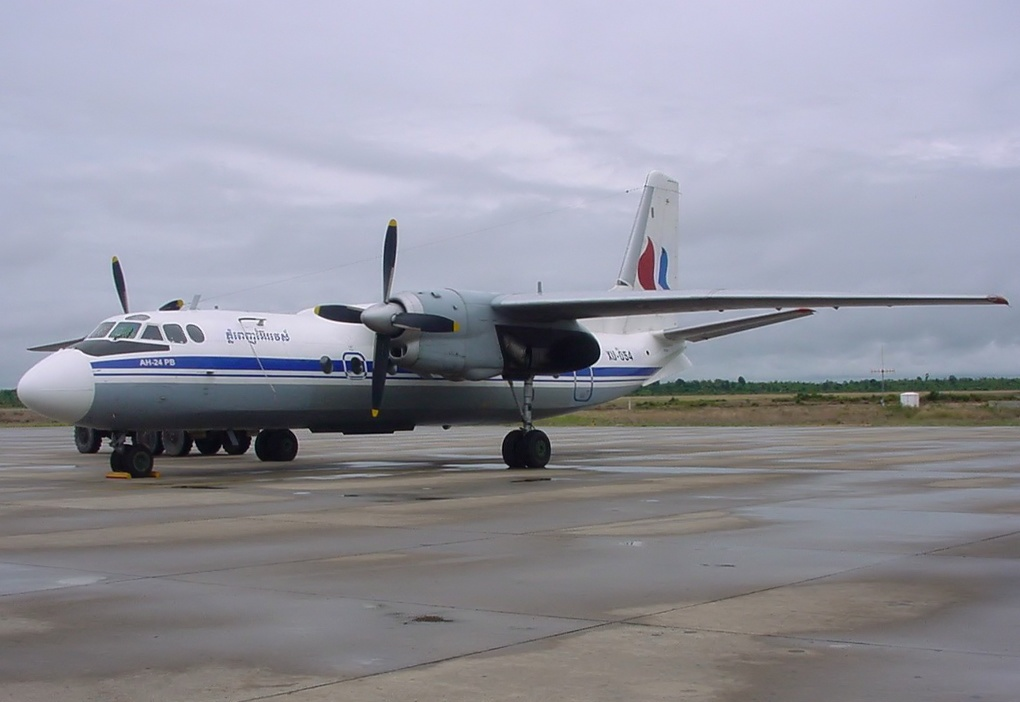
IATA	ICAO	Call sign
RL	PPW	-
- Founded: 1999
- Ceased operations: 2004
- Hubs: Pochentong International Airport
- Secondary hubs: Angkor International Airport
- Destinations: 6 (at closure)
- Headquarters: Phnom Penh, Cambodia

Royal Phnom Penh Airways was an airline based in Phnom Penh, Cambodia. It operated domestic services, as well as regional flights to Thailand out of Phnom Penh International Airport and Angkor International Airport, Siem Reap.

== History ==
The airline was established on 24 October 1999 and began international services on 28 December 2000. It was wholly owned by Prince Norodom Chakrapong. It was planned to extend international services to Ho Chi Minh City, to China and to Singapore, but the airline was shut down in 2004.

== Services ==
At closure, Royal Phnom Penh Airways operated the following services:

Country	City	Airport	Notes
Cambodia	Battambang	Battambang Airport	
Cambodia	Phnom Penh	Pochentong International Airport	Hub
Cambodia	Ratanankiri	Ratanankiri Airport	
Cambodia	Siem Reap	Angkor International Airport	Secondary Hub
Cambodia	Stung Treng	Stung Treng Airport	
Thailand	Bangkok	Bangkok International Airport	
