= Air Dream =

Cambodian charter airline

IATA	ICAO	Call sign
AD	ADA	-
- Founded: 2007
- Ceased operations: 2007
- Fleet size: 1
- Destinations: 2
- Headquarters: Cambodia

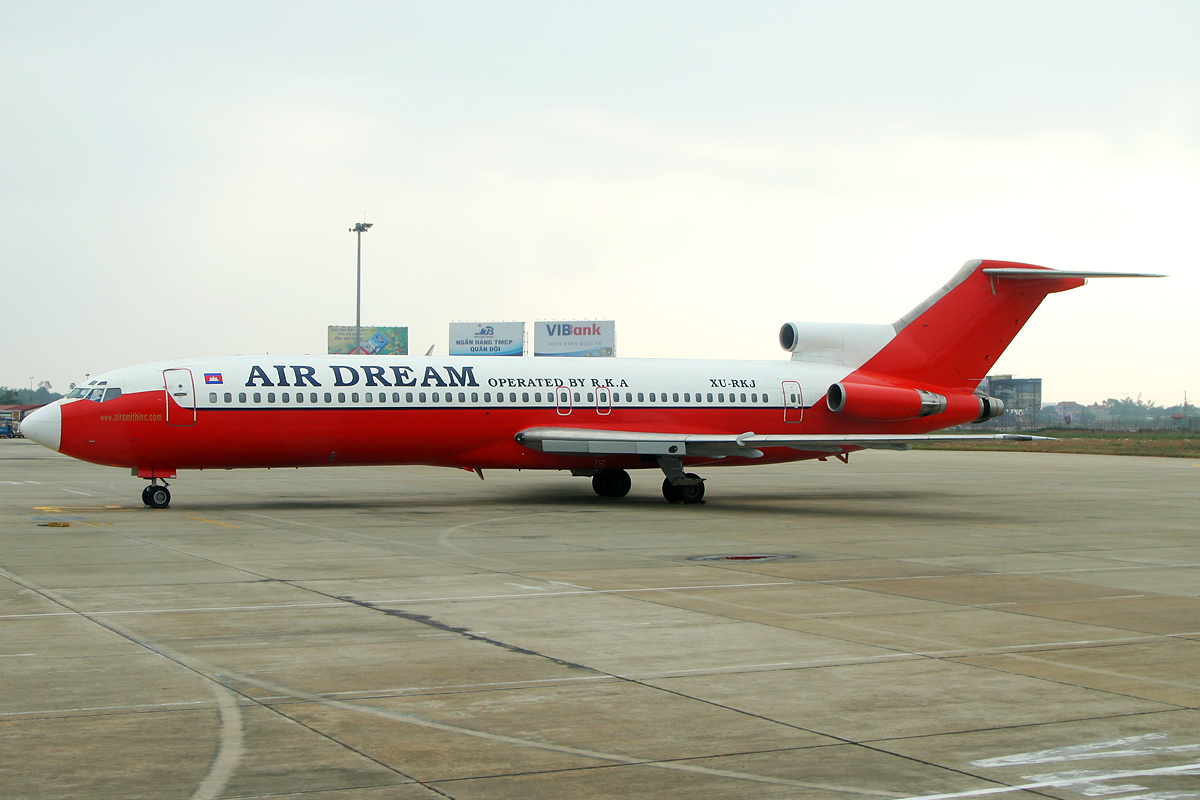
Air Dream Boeing 727-200

Air Dream was a short-lived charter airline based in Cambodia. During 2007, it operated flights between Siem Reap, Cambodia, and Hanoi, Vietnam. Its single aircraft, chartered from financially troubled Royal Khmer Airlines, was flown to Noi Bai International Airport, Hanoi, in late 2007 for maintenance reasons and abandoned there subsequently, as the airline was shut down.

== Fleet ==
Air Dream operated one ageing Boeing 727-200 jet airliner, which was originally delivered to American Airlines in 1988.
