= Angkor Airways =

Airline of Cambodia (2004–2008)

Angkor Airways Corporation
IATA	ICAO	Call sign
G6	AKW	AIR ANGKOR
- Founded: 2004
- Ceased operations: 9 May 2008
- Hubs: Phnom Penh International Airport
- Focus cities: Siem Reap International Airport
- Fleet size: 2
- Destinations: 7
- Parent company: Far Eastern Air Transport
- Headquarters: Phnom Penh, Cambodia
- Website: www.angkorairways.com

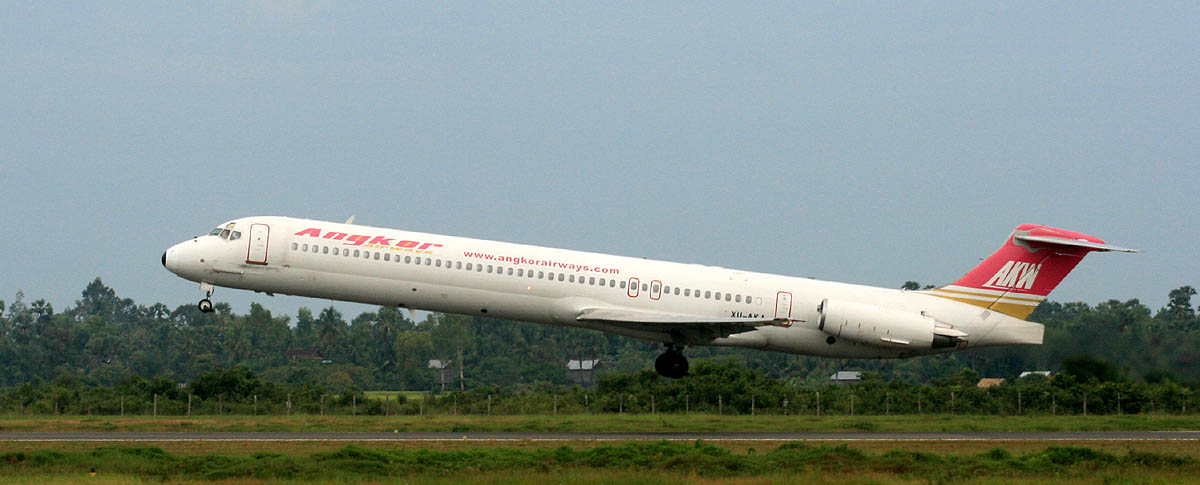
Angkor Airways MD-83

Angkor Airways was a Cambodian airline that was based in Phnom Penh. The airline started service in 2004 and had been substantially invested by Taiwan's Far Eastern Air Transport (FAT) as its subsidiary to make use of the Angkor International Airport in Siem Reap as its hub and as a fast transit station between Taiwan and People's Republic of China (where direct flights between the two locations were previously banned due to the political status of Taiwan), while meantime also operated some charter flights in the East Asia and Southeast Asia region. All its fleets were wet leased from the FAT.

Following a chain of financial crises of its parent FAT, on May 9, 2008, the airline ceased all operations due to financial issues.

== Destinations ==
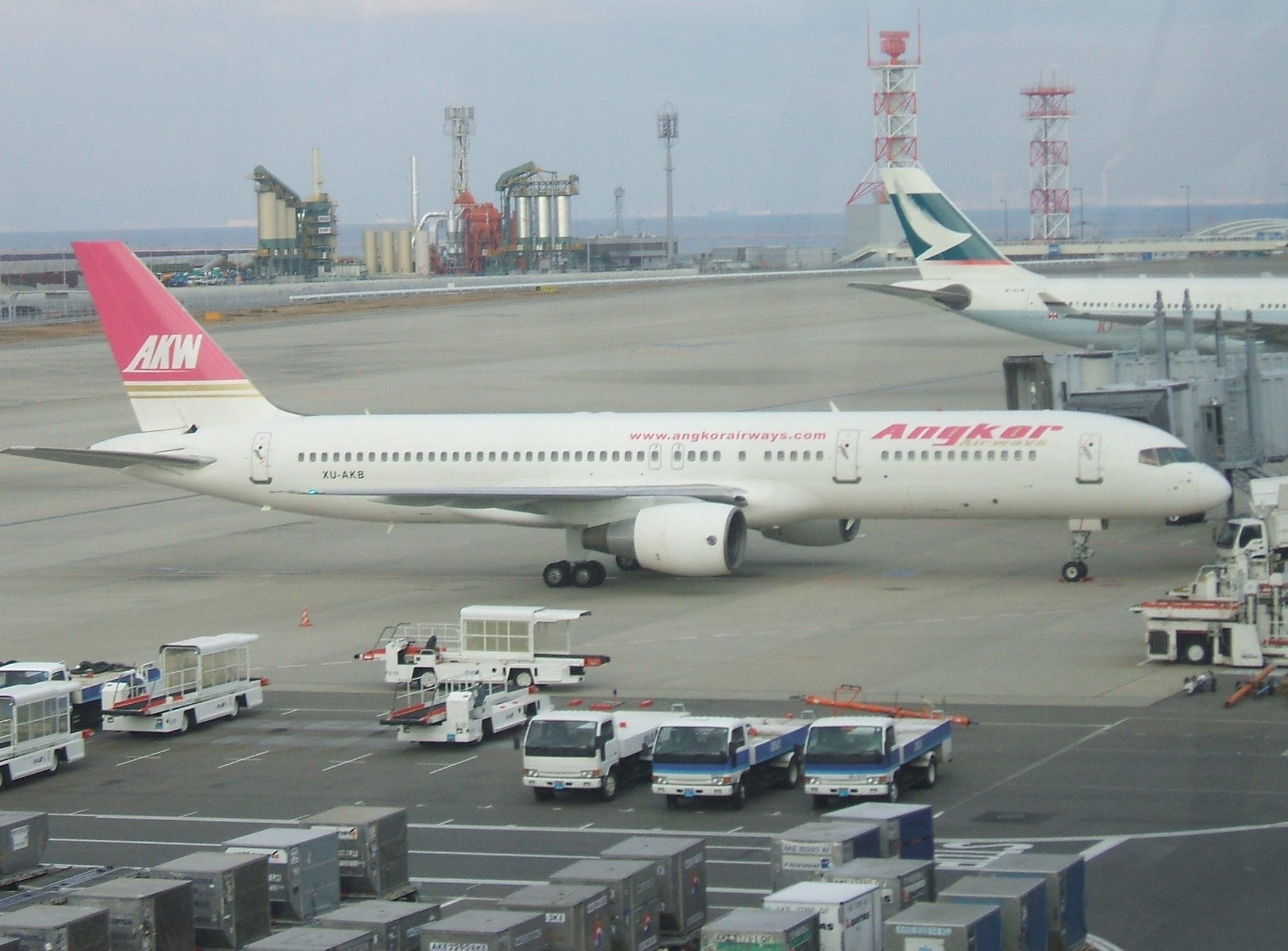
Angkor Airways Boeing 757

- Cambodia
  - Phnom Penh – Phnom Penh International Airport (main hub)
  - Siem Reap – Siem Reap International Airport (focus city)
- China
  - Chengdu – Chengdu Shuangliu International Airport
  - Kunming – Kunming Wujiaba International Airport
- Japan
  - Tokyo – Narita International Airport (charter)
  - Nagoya – Chubu Centrair International Airport (charter)
  - Niigata – Niigata Airport (charter)
  - Osaka – Kansai International Airport (charter)
  - Fukuoka – Fukuoka Airport (charter)
- Taiwan
  - Taipei – Taoyuan International Airport
  - Kaohsiung – Kaohsiung International Airport

== Fleet ==
The Angkor Airways fleet included the following aircraft (at April 2008):

- 1 Boeing 757-200 (which is leased from Far Eastern Air Transport)
- 1 McDonnell Douglas MD-83 (which is leased from Far Eastern Air Transport)
