= Bassaka Air =

Cambodian passenger airline

Bassaka Air អាកាសចរណ៍ បាសាកា
IATA	ICAO	Call sign
5B	BSX	BASSAKA
- Founded: 2013
- Commenced operations: 2014
- Ceased operations: February 2020
- Hubs: Phnom Penh International Airport
- Focus cities: Siem Reap Airport
- Fleet size: 2
- Destinations: 7
- Headquarters: 335 Preah Sihanouk Boulevard, Phnom Penh, Cambodia
- Website: www.bassakaair.com

Bassaka Air Limited (Khmer: អាកាសចរណ៍ បាសសាកា) was a passenger airline in Cambodia, headquartered in Phnom Penh.

== History ==
The airline was once called PP Air and changed its name to Bassaka Air. Bassaka Air also provided charter flight services to China. Bassaka Air received its air operator certificate on 6 October 2014. It commenced domestic flights on 1 December 2014 and international flights shortly thereafter on 1 May 2015, operating two Airbus A320 aircraft. Bassaka Air operated daily flights to Siem Reap and offered international service to Macau from Phnom Penh.

== Destinations ==
Bassaka Air served the following destinations:

Country/territory	City/region	Airport	Notes/refs
Cambodia	Phnom Penh	Phnom Penh International Airport	Hub
Cambodia	Siem Reap	Siem Reap International Airport	Focus city
China	Changsha	Changsha Huanghua International Airport	
China	Hangzhou	Hangzhou Xiaoshan International Airport	
China	Qingdao	Qingdao Liuting International Airport	
China	Xi'an	Xi'an Xianyang International Airport	
Macau	Macau	Macau International Airport	

== Fleet ==
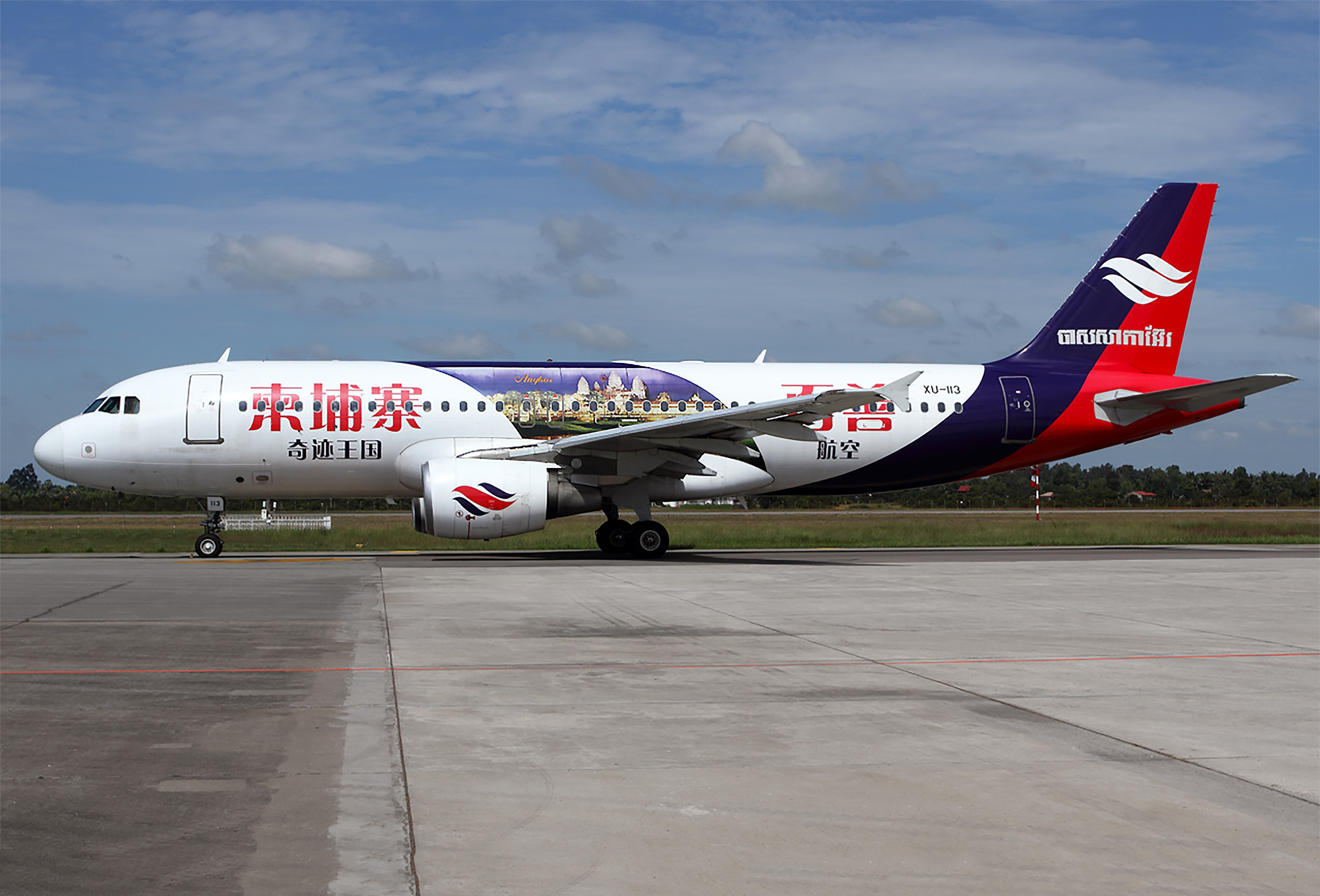
Bassaka Air Airbus A320-200

The Bassaka Air fleet consists of the following aircraft (as of August 2019):

Bassaka Air fleet
Aircraft	In service	Orders	Passengers			Notes
Aircraft	In service	Orders	C	Y	Total	Notes
Airbus A320-200	2	—	12	138	150	
Total	2	—				

== See also ==
- Transport in Cambodia
- List of airlines of Cambodia
