= President Airlines =

Cambodian airline (1998–2007)

IATA	ICAO	Call sign
TO	PSD	-
- Founded: 1997
- Commenced operations: October 1998
- Ceased operations: 2007
- Hubs: Phnom Penh International Airport
- Focus cities: Siem Reap International Airport
- Fleet size: 1
- Destinations: 4 (at closure)
- Headquarters: Phnom Penh, Cambodia
- Website: www.presidentairlines.com (defunct)

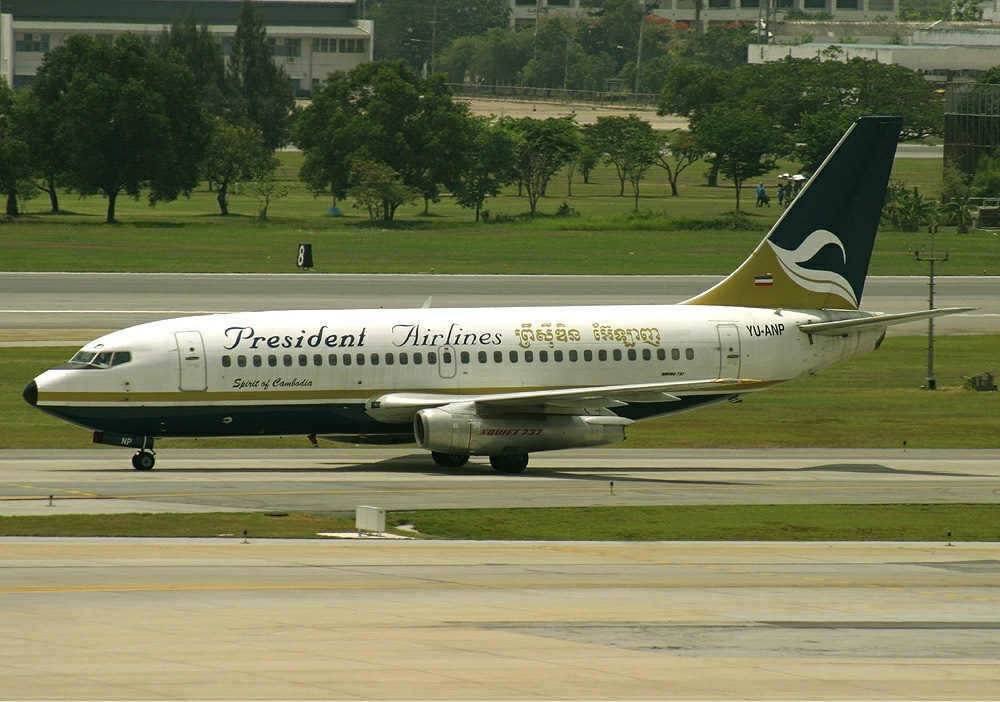
President Airlines Boeing 737-200 Don Mueang International Airport in 2003

President Airlines was an airline based in Phnom Penh, Cambodia. It was privately owned and operated scheduled passenger flights from Phnom Penh to domestic destinations, as well as flights to Thailand, China and Hong Kong out of Phnom Penh International Airport.

== History ==
President Airlines was established in 1997 and began operations in October 1998. Initially, it operated one Fokker F28 aircraft carrying passengers and cargo from Phnom Penh to Siem Reap. President Airlines subsequently consolidated its domestic routes and opened international services. In 2002, the airline joined IATA, thus allowing IATA Travel Agents to issue tickets through their respective reservations systems.

President Airlines was shut down in 2007.

== Fleet ==
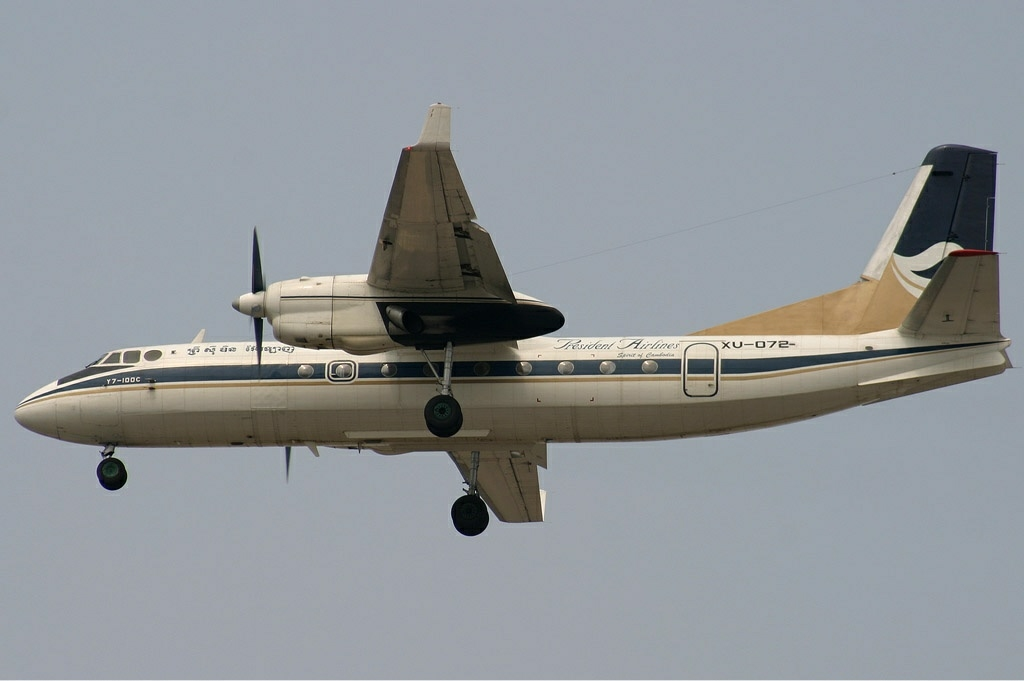
President Airlines Xian Y-7 at Don Mueang International Airport in 2005

The President Airlines fleet included the following aircraft:

President Airlines fleet
Aircraft	Total	Introduced	Retired	Notes
Antonov An-12	3	1999	2003	
Antonov An-24RV	5	1999	2005	
Antonov An-26	1	1999	2002	
Beechcraft 90	1	1998	2002	
Boeing 737-200	1	2003	2004	Leased from Aviogenex
Fokker F27 Friendship	1	1998	2005	
Fokker F28 Fellowship	1	1998	2002	
Xian Y-7	1	2005	2005	

== See also ==
- List of defunct airlines of Cambodia
