= First Cambodia Airlines =

Cambodian private airline

- First Cambodia Airlines logo
IATA	ICAO	Call sign
F6	FCC	First Cambodia
- Founded: February 2004
- Ceased operations: 2 August 2004
- Operating bases: Phnom Penh International Airport
- Fleet size: 1
- Destinations: See Services
- Headquarters: Cambodia

First Cambodia Airlines (Chinese: 柬埔寨第一航空) was a privately owned airline based in Phnom Penh that operated scheduled passenger services between February and August 2004. Owned by Hong Kong-based Newskyland and Cambodian investors Suor Pheng and Hun Mana (daughter of Prime Minister Hun Sen), the carrier leased two ATR 72-500 aircraft to serve routes connecting Phnom Penh with Singapore, Kuala Lumpur, Guangzhou, Siem Reap and other destinations. It also leased an Airbus A320-232 aircraft from ILFC.

== History ==
The airline was established in February 2004, but ceased operations on 2 August 2004 after financial difficulties meant its aircraft had to be returned to the lessor. Its launch and rapid collapse were covered in detail by the aviation press, reflecting its part in Cambodia's post-Royal Air Cambodge era, with in-depth analysis in Flight Global.
