= Cambodia Bayon Airlines =

Airline of Cambodia (2014–2019)

Cambodia Bayon Airlines អាកាសចរណ៍ កម្ពុជា បាយ័ន 柬埔寨巴戎航空
IATA	ICAO	Call sign
BD	BYC	Bayon Air
- Founded: August 2014
- Commenced operations: December 2014
- Ceased operations: 2019
- Hubs: Phnom Penh International Airport
- Focus cities: Siem Reap International Airport
- Fleet size: 2
- Destinations: 4
- Parent company: Joy Air; Aviation Industry Corporation of China
- Headquarters: Phnom Penh, Cambodia
- Key people: Yang Yu (President)
- Employees: 161 (on July 31, 2015)
- Website: www.bayonairlines.com

Cambodia Bayon Airlines (Khmer: អាកាសចរណ៍ កម្ពុជា បាយ័ន/បាយ័នអ៊ែរឡាញ) was an airline based in Phnom Penh, Cambodia. Its main hub was at Phnom Penh International Airport. The airline was a wholly owned subsidiary of Bayon Airlines Holding Ltd., which was in turn a subsidiary of the Chinese carrier Joy Air. It was registered in April 2014. The air operator's certificate was received in December 2014; the airline had its inaugural flight on December 31, 2014. Cambodia Bayon Airlines' first operational base in Cambodia was Phnom Penh. The company also had operational bases in Siem Reap, Sihanoukville and Ho Chi Minh City. The company slogan was For You. With You. About You.

== History ==
Cambodia Bayon Airlines was born in 2014 from the wish to invest in Cambodia's growing aviation market, based on the expertise of Chinese carrier Joy Air and aircraft manufacturer AVIC Aviation Industry Corporation of China.

17 April 2014: Establishment of Cambodia Bayon Airlines, in Phnom Penh, Cambodia

21 August 2014: Planning approval from the Prime Minister's Office, of the Kingdom of Cambodia

15 December 2014: Delivery of Bayon Airlines' first MA60 aircraft

30 December 2014: First scheduled flight, between Phnom Penh and Siem Reap

12 April 2015: Launch of domestic flights to Sihanoukville (city)

1 July 2015: Launch of international flights to Ho Chi Minh City, Vietnam

In 2019, the airline ceased all operations.

== Destinations ==
Cambodia Bayon Airlines operated the following routes prior to its closure:

=== Routes ===
- Cambodia
  - Phnom Penh International Airport - Siem Reap International Airport
  - Siem Reap International Airport - Sihanoukville International Airport
  - Phnom Penh International Airport - Sihanoukville International Airport
- Vietnam
  - Phnom Penh International Airport - Ho Chi Minh City, Tan Son Nhat International Airport

== In-flight services ==
Cambodia Bayon Airlines' MA60 airplanes have a capacity for 50 passengers and offer 48 economy seats and 2 business class seats. Full catering service is offered on both domestic and international flights. This includes a free meal and a complimentary drink. In-flight magazine is available on all flights. At Sihanoukville International Airport, a free shuttle service is offered, bringing flight guests from and to the city center.

== Fleet ==
=== Current ===
The Cambodia Bayon Airlines fleet consists of the following aircraft at August 2019:

Cambodia Bayon Airlines fleet information
Aircraft	In service	Orders	Passengers			Notes
Aircraft	In service	Orders	C	Y	Total	Notes
Xian MA60	2	18	-	60	60	
Total	2	18				

Cambodia Bayon Airlines has imported its second Xian MA60 aircraft from the state-owned Aviation Industry Corporation of China (AVIC); and the number of aircraft is expected to rise to five by the end of 2015. Cambodia Bayon Airlines plans to import at least 20 aircraft over 10 years, to serve its customers.

== See also ==
- Transport in Cambodia
- List of airlines of Cambodia
