= Cambodia Airlines =

Airline of Cambodia (1997–2005; 2013–2014)

IATA	ICAO	Call sign
Y6	CCL	ANGKOR WAT
- Founded: Part 1: 1997; Part 2: 2013
- Ceased operations: Part 1: 2005; Part 2: 2014
- Hubs: Phnom Penh International Airport
- Fleet size: 7
- Destinations: 3
- Parent company: The Royal Group (51%); PAL Holdings, Inc (49%)
- Headquarters: Phnom Penh, Cambodia
- Key people: Kith Meng (Chairman, The Royal Group); Ramon S. Ang (CEO, PAL Holdings, Inc.)

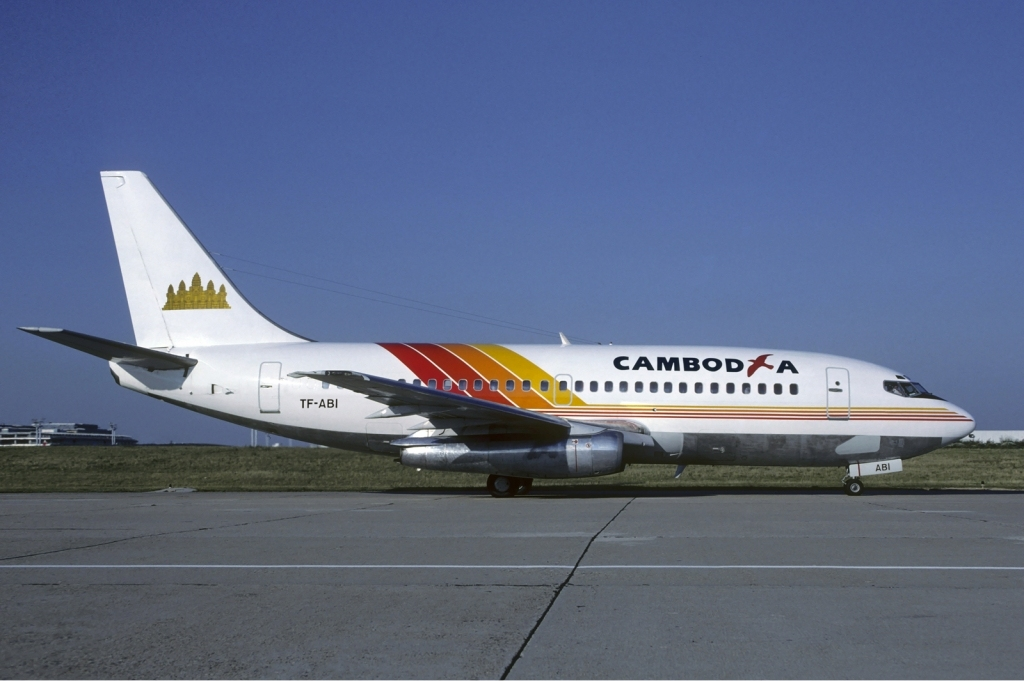
A Cambodia Airlines (1st incarnation) Boeing 737-200.

Cambodia Airlines was an airline in Cambodia owned by The Royal Group and PAL Holdings, Inc. of the Philippines. As of September 2022, the airline is no longer operating.

== History ==
Cambodia Airlines was founded in 1997 but its operations ceased in 2005.

In 2013, Philippine's flag carrier, Philippine Airlines, formed a joint venture with The Royal Group of Cambodia by buying a 49% stake in Cambodia Airlines. San Miguel Corporation, a diversified conglomerate in the Philippines, bought a stake in PAL Holdings, Inc. and took control of the management of Philippine Airlines from the Lucio Tan group. The Royal Group of Cambodia owned 100% of Cambodia Airlines before the joint venture. Operations between Manila and Phnom Penh were expected to begin in June 2013 while international flights were set to start in October the same year.

== Fleet ==
Cambodia Airlines initially leased two Airbus A320 for international flights and two Bombardier Dash 8 for domestic.

Cambodia Airlines fleet
Aircraft	In service	Orders	Passengers				Route	Notes
Aircraft	In service	Orders	C	P	Y	Total	Route	Notes
Airbus A320-200	-	5	0	0	177	177	International	
Bombardier Dash 8 Q400	-	2	0	0	76	76	Domestic	2015
Total		7						
