= Mekong Airlines =

Cambodian airline

IATA	ICAO	Call sign
M8	MKN	MEKONG AIRLINES
- Founded: 2002
- Commenced operations: January 2003
- Ceased operations: July 2003
- Operating bases: Phnom Penh
- Key people: Denzil Sprague (CEO); Heath Shen (President); Chung Leik Kok (Managing Director); Ross Pollock (Commercial Manager)

Mekong Airlines was an airline based in Cambodia that operated in 2003.

== History ==
Founded in 1998 as Yana Airlines (Khmer: ក្រុមហ៊ុនអាកាសចរណ៍យ៉ាណា), the company was renamed to Mekong Airlines in 2002.

Mekong Airlines operated scheduled flights to several destinations in Cambodia and southeast Asia using a leased Boeing 737-500, which was put in service in January 2003 and returned in October of that year, marking the end of the airline's business. The airline's operations ceased in July 2003 following weak demand caused by the SARS outbreak.

The airline was a joint venture between Cambodian, Australian and other investors.

== Fleet ==
Mekong Airlines operated a single Boeing 737-500 aircraft throughout operations.
