= Siem Reap Airways =

Regional airline of Cambodia (2000–2008)

Siem Reap Airways International Co., Ltd.
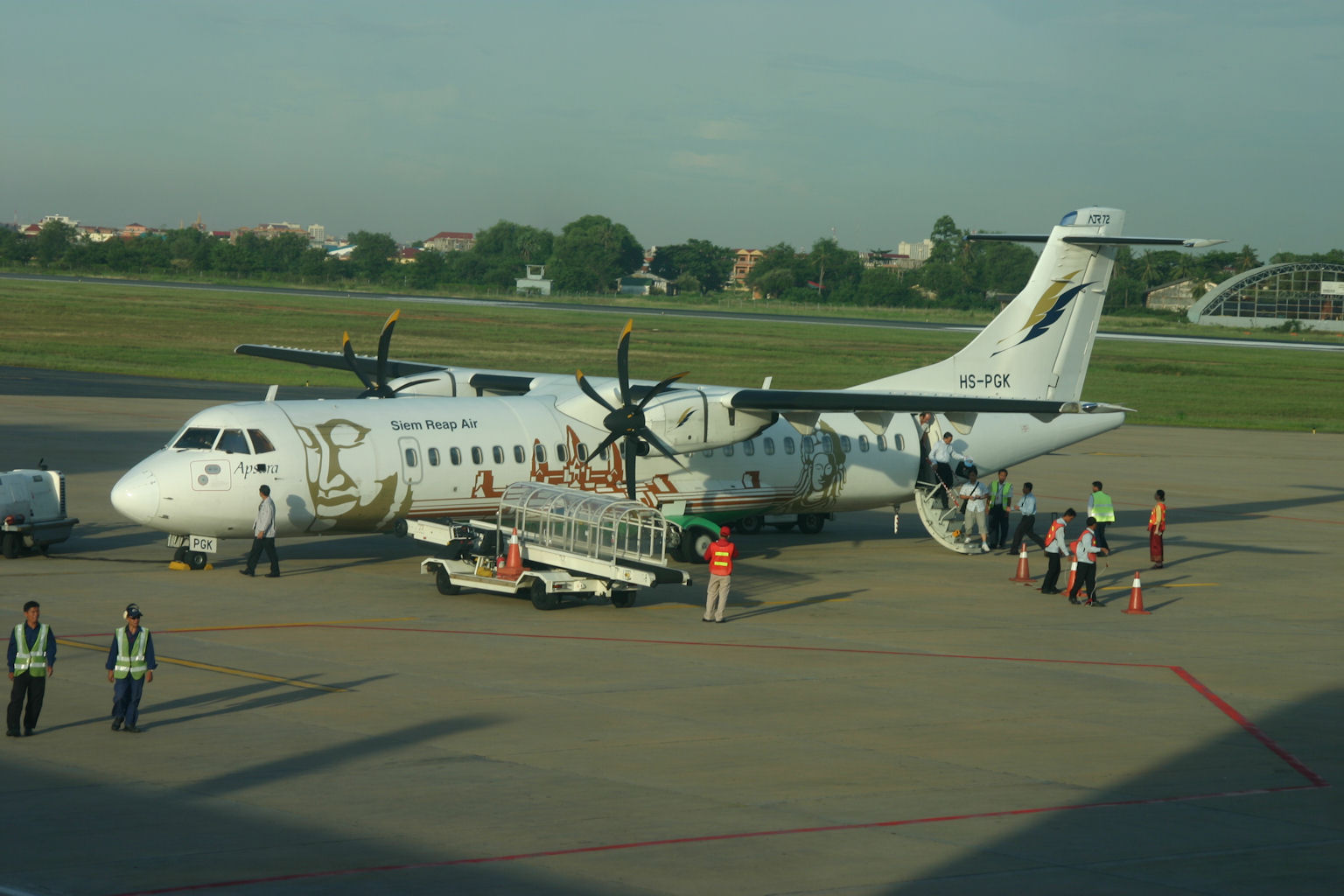
IATA	ICAO	Call sign
FT	SRH	SIEMREAP AIR
- Founded: 7 May 1998
- Commenced operations: 29 October 2000
- Ceased operations: 1 December 2008
- Hubs: Phnom Penh
- Secondary hubs: Bangkok–Don Mueang (2000–2006); Bangkok–Suvarnabhumi (2006–2008); Siem Reap
- Fleet size: 3
- Parent company: Bangkok Airways
- Headquarters: Phnom Penh, Cambodia
- Website: www.siemreapairways.com

Siem Reap Airways International was a Cambodian regional airline based in Phnom Penh, Cambodia. Wholly owned by Bangkok Airways of Thailand, its primary hub was Phnom Penh International Airport, with secondary hubs at Suvarnabhumi Airport and Siem Reap International Airport. It ceased operations on 1 December 2008.

== Destinations ==
During its eight-year existence, Siem Reap Airways flew to the following destinations:

- Cambodia
  - Koh Kong – Koh Kong Airport
  - Phnom Penh – Phnom Penh International Airport (Hub)
  - Siem Reap – Siem Reap International Airport (Hub)
  - Sihanoukville – Sihanouk International Airport
- Hong Kong
  - Hong Kong – Hong Kong International Airport
- Laos
  - Luang Prabang — Luang Prabang International Airport
  - Pakse — Pakse International Airport
- Thailand
  - Bangkok
    - Don Mueang International Airport (Hub; 2000–2006)
    - Suvarnabhumi Airport (Hub; 2006–2008)
- Vietnam
  - Ho Chi Minh City — Tan Son Nhat International Airport

== Fleet ==
During its eight-year existence, Siem Reap Airways operated the following aircraft types (all operated by Bangkok Airways):

Siem Reap Airways fleet
Aircraft	Total	Introduced	Retired	Notes
Airbus A320-200	2	2005	2008	
ATR 72-202	2	2000	2006	
ATR 72-500	1	2002	2008	
Boeing 717-200	1	2001	2008	

== Banned EU status ==
Siem Reap Airways appeared on the European Union's list of prohibited carriers for safety reasons and was therefore banned from operating services of any kind to or within any EU nations. As of 1 December 2008, the airline sought clarification from the European Union about the ban.
