= Phnom Penh International Airport =

Airport in Phnom Penh, Cambodia (1959–2025)

Phnom Penh International Airport អាកាសយានដ្ឋានអន្តរជាតិភ្នំពេញ

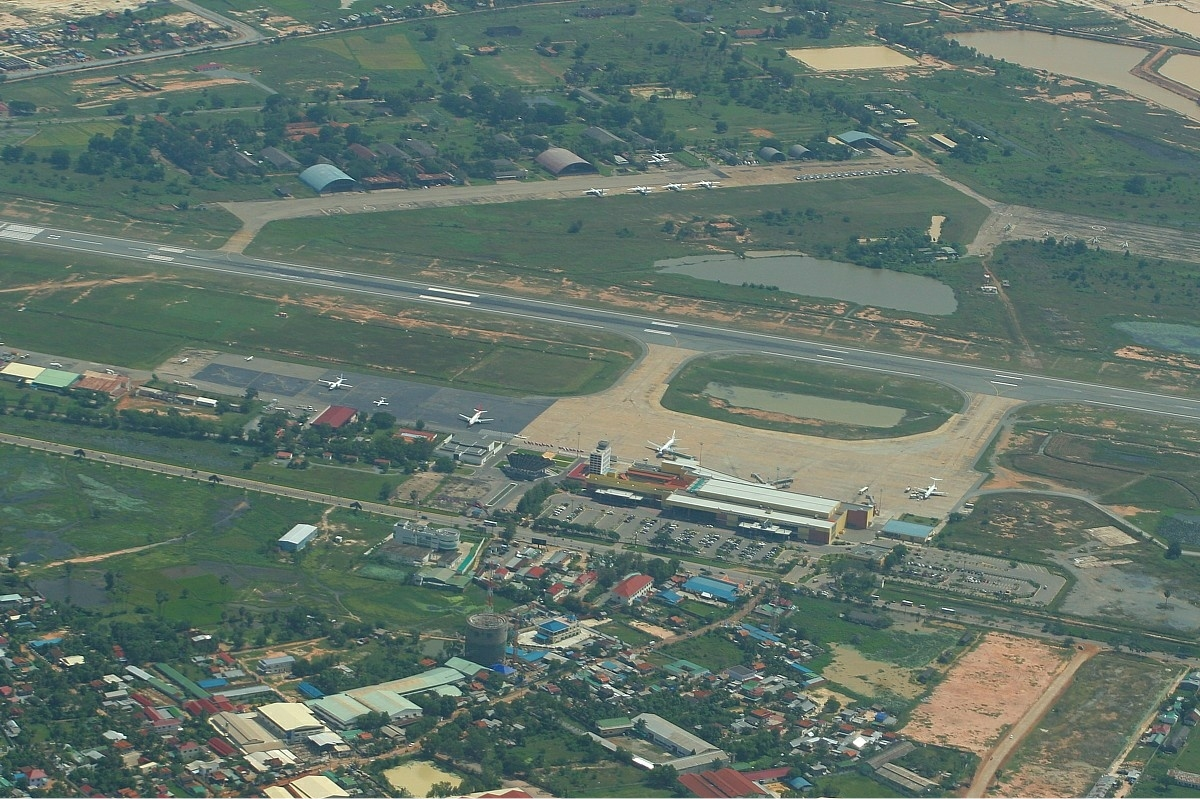
- IATA: PNH; ICAO: VDPP

Summary
- Airport type: Public / military
- Owner: Royal Government of Cambodia
- Operator: Société Concessionnaire de l'Aeroport (SCA, operating as Cambodia Airports)
- Serves: Phnom Penh, Cambodia
- Location: Pou Senchey
- Opened: 19 January 1959
- Passenger services ceased: 8 September 2025
- Hub for: Royal Air Cambodge (1959–2001); Mekong Airlines (1998–2003); Kampuchea Airlines (1997–2004); Royal Phnom Penh Airways (1999–2004); First Cambodia Airlines (Feb 2004–Aug 2004); President Airlines (1997–2007); Siem Reap Airways (2000–2008); PMTair (2003–2008); Angkor Airways (2004–2008); Royal Khmer Airlines (2000–2011); Cambodia Airlines (1997–2005; 2013–2014); Cambodia Bayon Airlines (2014–2019); Bassaka Air (2013–2020); JC International Airlines (2014–2023); Lanmei Airlines (2016–2024); Air Cambodia (2009–2025); Cambodia Airways (2017–2025)
- Focus city for: Vietnam Airlines (2009–2025)
- Operating base for: Sky Angkor Airlines (2010–2025); AirAsia Cambodia (2022–2025)
- Built: 1924
- Elevation AMSL: 12 m (39 ft)
- Coordinates: 11°32′47″N 104°50′38″E
- Website: pnh.cambodia-airports.aero

Maps
- Location of airport in Cambodia

Runways
Direction	Length		Surface
Direction	m	ft	Surface
05/23	3,000	9,843	Asphalt

Statistics (2024)
- Passenger movements: 4,746,000 ▲19%
- Aircraft movements: 41,022 ▲12%
- www.vinci-airports.com

Phnom Penh International Airport (IATA: PNH, ICAO: VDPP), formerly Pochentong International Airport, is the former international airport serving Phnom Penh, Cambodia and the country's main international gateway. It was Cambodia's second largest airport by area after the new Siem Reap–Angkor International Airport before its closure. It is located in the Pou Senchey District, 10 km (5.4 nautical miles) west of Phnom Penh city centre.

The airport was replaced by Techo International Airport on 9 September 2025.

== History ==
The history of Pochentong Airport dates back to 1924, as the current site was used for an airfield. During the Japanese occupation of Cambodia they built as many as fifteen airports through the country, including on the site of the current airport. After independence from France in 1953, King Norodom Sihanouk ordered new airstrips or improvements to existing sites.

During the Cambodian War, the airport was used extensively for airlifts of military and civilian supplies. Between October and December 1973, C-130s of the 374th Tactical Air Lift brought 3,000 tons of rice in via airlift. After the last land and water based routes fell into the hands of the Khmer Rouge in April 1975, the airport became the sole path for supplies for Phnom Penh.

After the collapse of the Khmer Republic in 1975, Pochentong was almost completely closed to international travel, except some flights directly from Beijing and Pyongyang. These flights consisted of cadres to train the new government, as well as some Cambodian intellectuals and diplomats who volunteered to return to the country.

In July 1995, the Royal Government of Cambodia (RGC) signed a concession agreement with the French–Malaysian joint venture company. The company, Société Concessionaire d'Aéroport (SCA, operating as "Cambodia Airports"), is 70% owned by Vinci Airports and 30% owned by Muhibbah Masteron. In return for a 20-year concession, SCA committed to a $100 million improvement program.

In March 2011, Air France began flights to Paris via Bangkok using Airbus A340s. The stopover changed to Ho Chi Minh City the following year. The route lasted until March 2013.

In 2014, SCA announced the start of the $100 million project to expand the passenger terminals at Phnom Penh and Siem Reap international airports to accommodate continued strong passenger growth. The project saw the extension of the parking lots and terminals, more check-in and immigration counters, and new baggage handling systems. Additionally, the commercial areas were enlarged to accommodate more retail shops, new restaurants and food and beverage outlets, and mezzanine lounges to serve first-class and business travelers. The expansions allowed the airport to double its capacity to handle 5 million passengers a year from 2.5 million passengers.

In 2015, Cambodian opposition politician Son Chhay asked the government to rescind the concession agreement with SCA. He claimed that Cambodia "may be getting ripped off in the deal".

In 2020, it was reported that SCA would lose the concession for Phnom Penh (along with Siem Reap) after plans were announced to build two new airports in those locations. However, SCA subsequently secured an MoU with State Secretariat of Civil Aviation to operate the new Phnom Penh Airport, Techo International Airport.

On 16 May 2025, Prime Minister Hun Manet stated that Pochentong Airport would be preserved as a historical site, recognizing its origins as the work of His Majesty King Father Norodom Sihanouk. This preservation serves to protect significant infrastructure and to honor the nation's history and memory.

== Future development ==
In January 2018, the Cambodian government approved a proposal to build a new airport to serve Phnom Penh that will cost an estimated US$1.5 billion. The new international airport will replace the existing Phnom Penh International Airport, with initial plans having the facilities being constructed on partially reclaimed land adjacent to Boueng Cheung Loung, a large lake in Kandal Province about 30 kilometres south of Phnom Penh.

Cambodia Airport Investment, a joint venture 90 percent owned by Overseas Cambodia Investment Corporation (OCIC), one of the country's largest real estate developers, and 10 percent by the government's State Secretariat of Civil Aviation, plans to invest the $1.5 billion to construct the new airport. The OCIC will invest US$280 million, while unspecified "foreign banks" will provide US$1.1 billion in funding. The OCIC will own 90 per cent of the shares in the completed airport, with the rest going to the SSCA While the construction plans are still in the early stages of development, the 4F class airport will be capable of handling large long-haul aircraft and will reportedly cover an area of around 2,600 hectares, which would make it one of the largest airports in the world.

In 2020, then-Prime Minister Hun Sen announced that the Phnom Penh airport would remain active after the new airport was activated, primarily serving as air freight, military, local flights, private flights, and high-level visitors.

At the official launch of Techo International Airport on 20 October 2025, Prime Minister Hun Manet reaffirmed his earlier pledge to preserve the historical Phnom Penh International Airport and continue to keep it as state property with plans to convert it to a public park and multipurpose area, while preserving its runway for emergency landings, rebuffed the claims that the airport would be sold to the private sector for commercial and residential uses. The comprehensive plan of the airport's development is still unknown, but the Cambodian Prime Minister said in the same speech that the transformation plan is expected to be completed by early 2026.

== Facilities ==
=== Overview ===
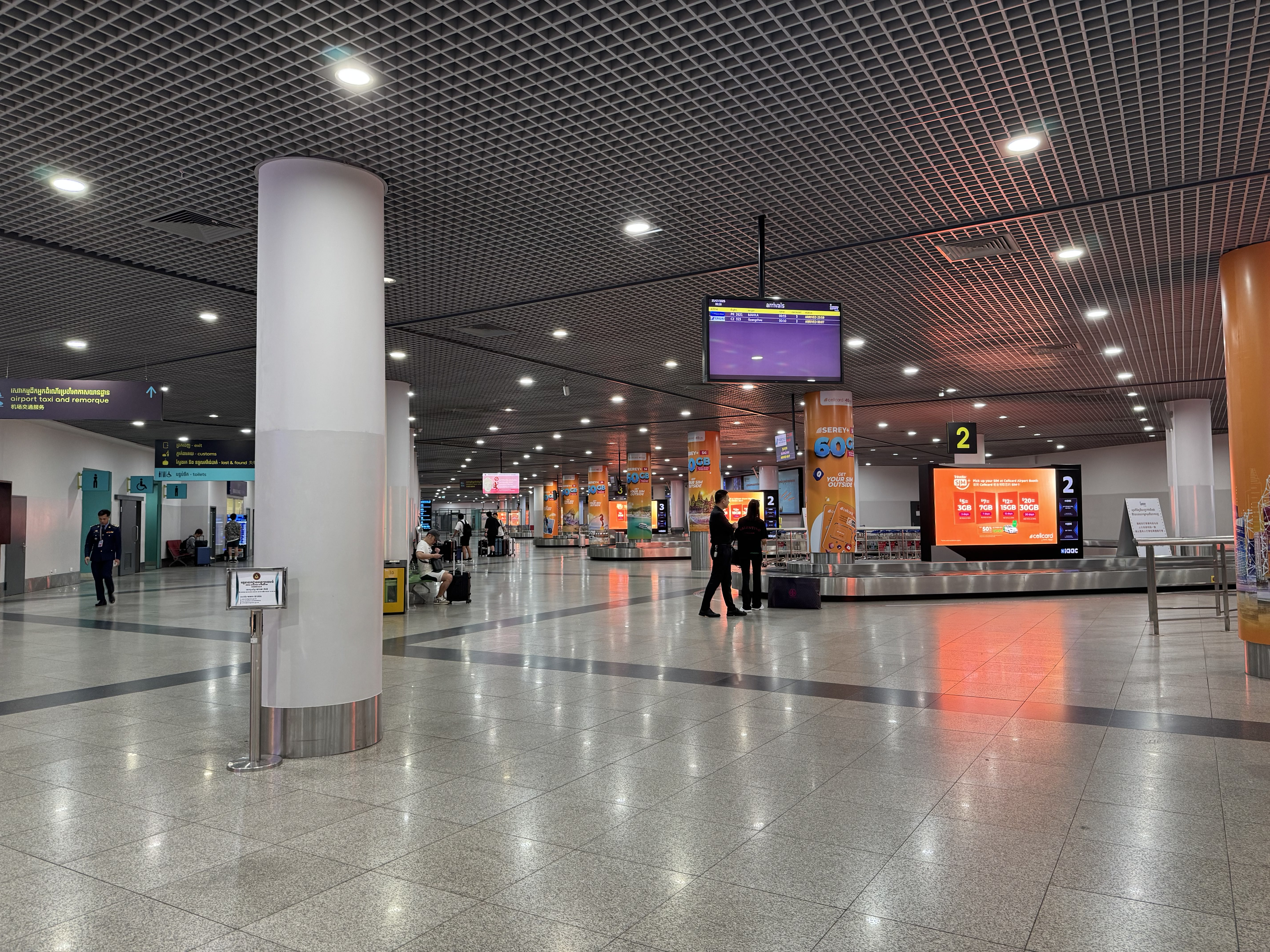
The baggage reclaim area of Phnom Penh International Airport in July 2025

The airport is at an elevation of 40 feet (12 metres) above mean sea level. It has one runway designated 05/23 with an asphalt surface measuring 3,000 by 50 metres (9,840 by 160 feet). The airport has two terminal buildings – one for international and one for domestic operations. In 2022, it added a new facility for VIP service. The international terminal has four aerobridges built in 2003. Three more aerobridges were added during the passenger terminal expansion in 2016–2017. The airport's design capacity is 5 million people per year.

== Former airlines and destinations ==
The last flights in Phnom Penh International Airport operated on 8 September 2025, after which all flights transferred to Techo International Airport on 9 September.

=== Passenger ===
*Destinations at time of airport closure on 8 September 2025:

Airlines	Destinations
AirAsia Cambodia	Hanoi, Ho Chi Minh City, Kuala Lumpur–International, Siem Reap
Air Cambodia	Bangkok–Suvarnabhumi, Delhi, Guangzhou, Hanoi, Ho Chi Minh City, Hong Kong, Nanning, Phu Quoc, Shenzhen, Siem Reap, Sihanoukville, Zhengzhou
Air China	Beijing–Capital
Asiana Airlines	Seoul–Incheon
Cambodia Airways	Bangkok–Suvarnabhumi, Changsha, Chengdu–Tianfu, Chongqing, Dara Sakor, Guangzhou, Haikou, Hong Kong, Kuala Lumpur–International, Macau, Ningbo, Penang, Sanya, Shenzhen, Siem Reap, Singapore
China Airlines	Taipei–Taoyuan
China Eastern Airlines	Kunming, Shanghai–Pudong, Wuhan
China Southern Airlines	Guangzhou
Emirates	Dubai–International, Singapore
EVA Air	Taipei–Taoyuan
Indonesia AirAsia	Jakarta–Soekarno-Hatta
Korean Air	Seoul–Incheon
PAL Express	Manila
Qatar Airways	Doha, Ho Chi Minh City
Shenzhen Airlines	Shenzhen
Singapore Airlines	Singapore
Sky Angkor Airlines	Bangkok–Suvarnabhumi, Changsha, Macau, Seoul–Incheon, Shanghai–Pudong
Spring Airlines	Chengdu–Tianfu, Guangzhou, Shanghai–Pudong, Shenzhen, Xi'an
Thai AirAsia	Bangkok–Don Mueang
Thai VietJet Air	Bangkok–Suvarnabhumi
Vietnam Airlines	Hanoi, Ho Chi Minh City, Vientiane

=== Cargo ===
Airlines	Destinations
Cathay Cargo	Hong Kong, Penang, Singapore
K-Mile Air	Bangkok–Suvarnabhumi
Pattaya Airways	Bangkok–Suvarnabhumi
Qatar Cargo	Bangkok–Suvarnabhumi, Doha, Hyderabad, Yangon

== Statistics ==
Statistics for Phnom Penh International Airport
Year	Total passengers	Change from previous year	Total aircraft movements	Change from previous year
1998	600,000		6,000	
1999	700,000		8,000	
2000	800,000		9,000	
2001	900,000		17,000	
2002	900,000		18,000	
2003	900,000		16,000	
2004	1,200,000		18,000	
2005	1,081,745	▼10%	17,035	▼4%
2006	1,322,267	▲22%	19,282	▲13%
2007	1,598,424	▲21%	20,881	▲9%
2008	1,691,870	▲6%	20,383	▼3%
2009	1,587,986	▼6%	20,352	▼0.15%
2010	1,673,421	▲6%	20,156	▼1%
2011	1,839,892	▲10%	21,365	▲6%
2012	2,077,282	▲13%	22,534	▲6%
2013	2,393,680	▲15%	26,583	▲18%
2014	2,665,894	▲12%	27,936	▲5%
2015	3,079,068	▲16%	31,409	▲13%
2016	3,388,553	▲10%	33,435	▲7%
2017	4,240,000	▲25%	41,057	▲23%
2018	5,423,000	▲28%	52,217	▲27%
2019	6,029,000	▲11%	56,018	▲8%
2020	1,331,000	▼78%	18,346	▼67%
2021	250,000	▼81%	10,173	▼45%
2022	1,971,000	▲789%	22,323	▲220%
2023	3,976,000	▲201%	36,673	▲64%
2024	4,746,000	▲19%	41,022	▲12%

In the first half of 2025, Phnom Penh international airport obtained 2,695,000 passengers and 23,432 commercial flights, sharing the increase in percentage of 18% and 18% respectively.

== Ground transportation ==
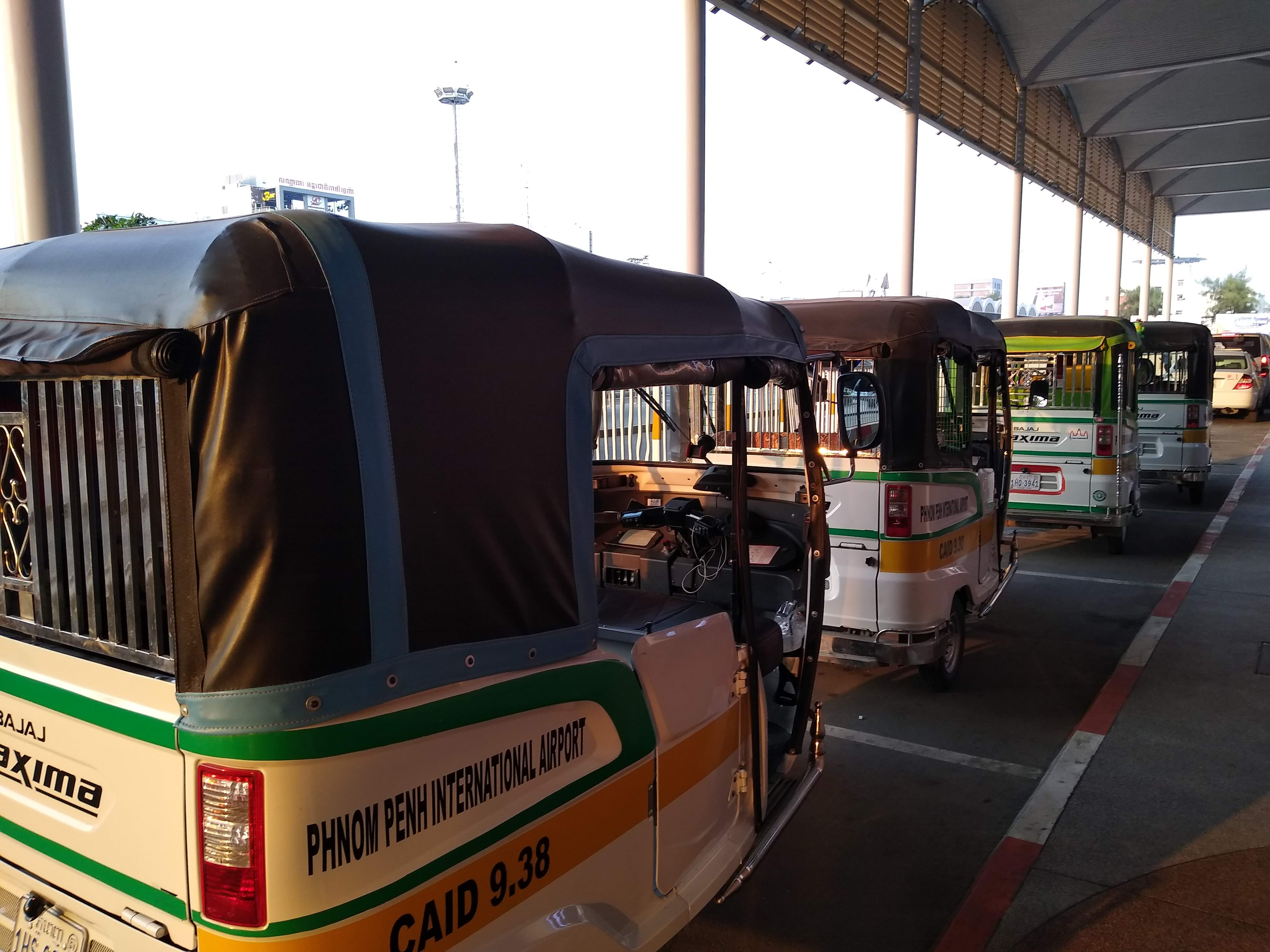
Tuk-tuks at Phnom Penh International Airport

There are a few options to transfer to or from Phnom Penh International Airport and the city. Outside the arrival hall, passengers can take a taxi provided by the Airport Taxi Association or book a ride from Grab, a ride-hailing app. In April 2018, trains operated by Royal Railway Cambodia began running express from Phnom Penh International Airport (parking area) to Phnom Penh railway station (City Center). Trains run every 30 minutes and the journey takes roughly 30 minutes, fare of one-way is US$2.50. There is also the city bus and an airport express bus.

== Accidents and incidents ==
- 3 December 1973: A Douglas DC-3 XW-PHV of Air Union was reported to have crashed shortly after take-off.
- 19 January 1975: A Douglas C-47A XU-HAK, Douglas DC-3 XU-KAL of Khmer Hansa and Douglas C-47A N86AC of South East Asia Air Transport were all destroyed in a rocket attack on the airport.
- 22 February 1975: A Douglas C-47A XU-GAJ of Khmer Hansa was damaged beyond economic repair in a rocket attack.
- 10 March 1975: A Douglas DC-3 of Samaki Airlines was damaged beyond economic repair in a rocket attack.
- 11 March 1975: A Douglas DC-3 of Khmer Hansa was damaged beyond economic repair in a rocket attack.
- 14 March 1975: A Vickers Viscount XW-TDN of Royal Air Lao crashed at Phnom Penh International Airport. The pilot was not qualified to fly the aircraft. All four people on board were killed. Accident aircraft also reported as XW-TFK with a date of 15 March.
- 11 April 1975: A Douglas DC-3 (possibly XW-PKT) of Sorya Airlines was hit by shrapnel shortly after take-off. The aircraft was destroyed by fire and two of the three occupants were killed. The same day, Douglas C-47B XW-TFB of Air Cambodge was damaged beyond economic repair in a rocket attack.
- 3 September 1997: Vietnam Airlines Flight 815, operated by a Tupolev Tu-134 crashed on approach to Pochentong Airport, killing 65 of the 66 passengers on board. The aircraft was entirely destroyed. The aircraft was flying from Ho Chi Minh City to Phnom Penh. The Tupolev was approaching the Phnom Penh airport runway in heavy rain from 2,000 meters; at this point the control tower ordered the pilot to attempt an approach from the west due to a wind pick-up. The crew then lost communication with the tower, and three minutes later the aircraft collided at low level with trees, damaging the left wing. The aircraft then slid 200 yards into a dry rice paddy before exploding. Pilot error was later identified as the cause of the crash; the pilot continued his landing descent from an altitude of 2,000 meters to 30 meters even though the runway was not in sight, and ignored pleas from his first officer and flight engineer to turn back. When the aircraft hit the trees, the pilot finally realized the runway was not in sight and tried to abort the approach; the flight engineer pushed for full power, but the aircraft lost control and veered left; the right engine then stalled, making it impossible to gain lift.

== See also ==
- Techo International Airport
- Siem Reap–Angkor International Airport
- Sihanouk International Airport
- List of defunct international airports
