= JC International Airlines =

Airline of Cambodia (2014–2023)

JC International Airlines Co., Ltd. ជេសុី អុិនធើណេសិនណល អ៊ែរឡាញ Chési Ĭntheunésĕnnâl Êlanh អាកាសចរណ៍អន្តរជាតិជេសុី 柬埔寨景成國際航空
IATA	ICAO	Call sign
QD	JCC	CAMBO
- Founded: 2014
- Commenced operations: 17 March 2017
- Ceased operations: February 2023
- Hubs: Phnom Penh International Airport
- Fleet size: 5
- Destinations: 3
- Headquarters: Phnom Penh, Cambodia
- Website: www.jc-airlines.com

JC International Airlines was an airline based at Phnom Penh International Airport in Cambodia.

== History ==
JC International Airlines was founded in Phnom Penh with registered capital of US$50 million. The total investment will be US$ 1 billion. JC (Cambodia) International Airlines received Initial Principal Approval from the Royal Government of Cambodia on 14 October 2014. On 17 March 2017, JC launched its inaugural service.

In February 2023 JC suspended their flights and started restructure. The airlines had a legal settlement with a local court for parent company Yunnan Jingcheng Group in the beginning of 2024. They plan to restart operations in November 2025 with new ownership and new management team.

== Final destinations ==
JC International Airlines served the following destinations:

Country / territory	City / region	Airport	Notes	Refs
Cambodia	Phnom Penh	Phnom Penh International Airport	Hub	
China	Kunming	Kunming Changshui International Airport		
Thailand	Bangkok	Suvarnabhumi Airport		

== Fleet ==
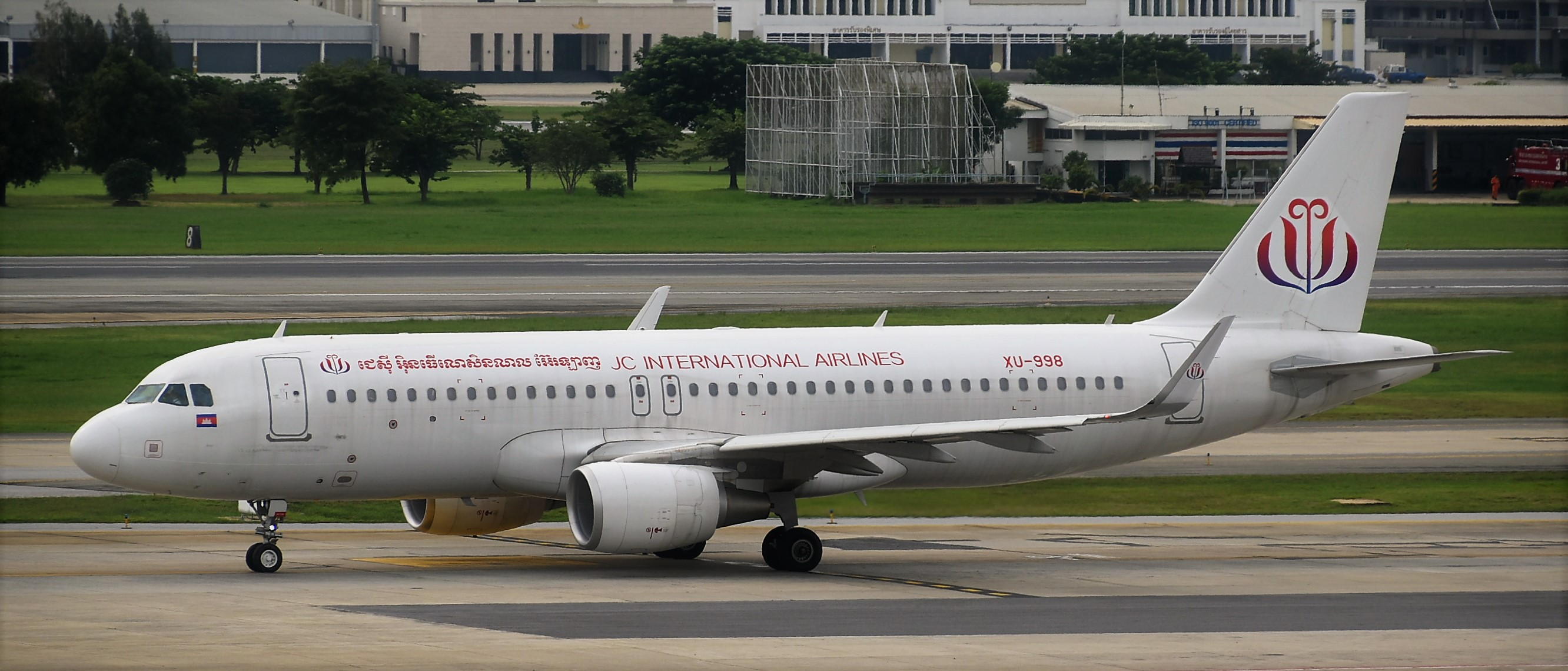
JC International Airlines Airbus A320-200

JC International Airlines operated the following aircraft during its existence (As of March 2025):

Aircraft	Historic	Orders	Passengers	Notes
Airbus A320-200	5	1	180	
Total	5	—		

== See also ==
- List of airlines of Cambodia
- Transport in Cambodia
