= Royal Khmer Airlines =

Airline of Cambodia (2000–2011)

IATA	ICAO	Call sign
FE	RKH	KHMER AIR
- Founded: 2000
- Commenced operations: 15 May 2004
- Ceased operations: November 2011
- Hubs: Phnom Penh International Airport
- Fleet size: 4
- Headquarters: Phnom Penh, Cambodia
- Website: www.royalkhmerairlines.com

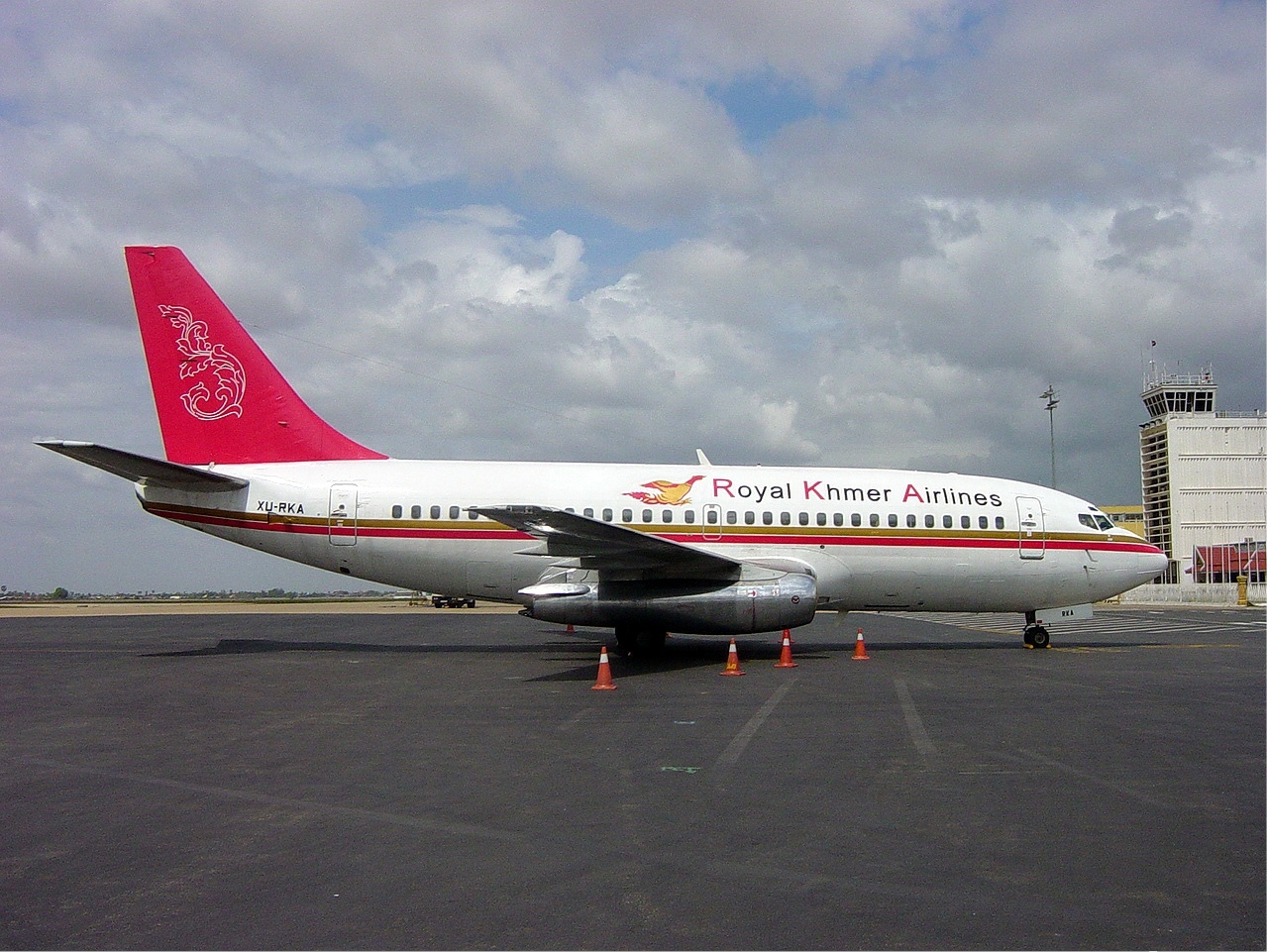
A Royal Khmer Airlines Boeing 737-200 at Phnom Penh International Airport (2004).

Royal Khmer Airlines was a small airline based in Phnom Penh, Cambodia. It operated scheduled passenger services out of Phnom Penh International Airport and Siem Reap International Airport.

== History ==
Finally, Royal Khmer Airlines acquired aging Boeing 737-200, which was put in service on 15 May 2004, and subsequently started scheduled passenger operations. These services proved to be unreliable and during much of 2005, the airline was inoperative. In November 2011, the airline was shut down.

== Fleets ==
Royal Khmer Airlines had 04 fleets and all are Boeing 737-200 such as XU-RKA, XU-RKB, XU-RKC, XU-RKH

== Destinations ==
Royal Khmer Airlines published its last flight timetable in late 2006, which listed the following scheduled destinations:

- Cambodia
  - Phnom Penh – Phnom Penh International Airport
  - Siem Reap – Siem Reap International Airport
- South Korea
  - Seoul – Incheon International Airport
- Vietnam
  - Hanoi – Noi Bai International Airport
  - Ho Chi Minh City – Tan Son Nhat International Airport
