= Lanmei Airlines =

Cambodian airline

Lanmei Airlines ឡានម៉ីអ៊ែរឡាញ
IATA	ICAO	Call sign
LQ	MKR	AIR LANME
- Founded: 2016
- Commenced operations: 15 September 2017
- Ceased operations: 2024
- Hubs: Phnom Penh International Airport
- Secondary hubs: Siem Reap–Angkor International Airport
- Focus cities: Sihanouk International Airport
- Fleet size: 2
- Destinations: 8
- Headquarters: Phnom Penh, Cambodia
- Key people: Dr. Lee Kun Li Yue Zhou
- Website: www.lanmeiairlines.com

Lanmei Airlines (Cambodia) Co., Ltd (Khmer: ឡានម៉ីអ៊ែរឡាញ; Chinese: 澜湄航空) was a Cambodian airline that operated scheduled flights.

== History ==
Based in Phnom Penh and Siem Reap, Lanmei Airlines was a local Cambodia air transport company. "Lanmei" is an abbreviation for the Lancang-Mekong River. The Lancang River originates in Southwest China and becomes known as Mekong.

Lanmei Airlines commenced four times weekly Phnom Penh-Hanoi and Phnom Penh-Siem Reap-Ho Chi Minh City services on 15 September 2017 and three times weekly Phnom Penh-Siem Reap-Macau-Phnom Penh service on 16 September 2017. In the Coronavirus period, Lanmei Airlines Flew to Kathmandu, Islamabad, Lahore, New Delhi, and Yangon. Lanmei Airlines and Cambodian MJ Airlines signed a strategic cooperation agreement in November 2018. In 2024 the airline ceased all operations.

== Destinations ==
As of January 2023, Lanmei Airlines served the following destinations:

Country	City	Airport	Notes	Refs
Cambodia	Phnom Penh	Phnom Penh International Airport	Hub	
Cambodia	Siem Reap	Siem Reap–Angkor International Airport	Hub	
Cambodia	Sihanoukville	Sihanouk International Airport	Focus city	
China	Changsha	Changsha Huanghua International Airport		
China	Chengdu	Chengdu Shuangliu International Airport	Terminated	
China	Fuzhou	Fuzhou Changle International Airport	Terminated	
China	Guangzhou	Guangzhou Baiyun International Airport		
China	Guiyang	Guiyang Longdongbao International Airport	Terminated	
China	Jieyang	Jieyang Chaoshan International Airport	Terminated	
China	Nanchang	Nanchang Changbei International Airport	Terminated	
China	Nanjing	Nanjing Lukou International Airport	Terminated	
China	Nanning	Nanning Wuxu International Airport		
China	Shenzhen	Shenzhen Bao'an International Airport	Terminated	
China	Shijiazhuang	Shijiazhuang Zhengding International Airport	Terminated	
China	Tianjin	Tianjin Binhai International Airport	Terminated	
China	Wuhan	Wuhan Tianhe International Airport	Terminated	
China	Xiamen	Xiamen Gaoqi International Airport	Terminated	
China	Xi’an	Xi'an Xianyang International Airport	Terminated	
Hong Kong	Hong Kong	Hong Kong International Airport	Terminated	
Macau	Macau	Macau International Airport	Terminated	
Malaysia	Kuala Lumpur	Kuala Lumpur International Airport		
Philippines	Manila	Ninoy Aquino International Airport	Terminated	
Thailand	Bangkok	Suvarnabhumi Airport		
Vietnam	Ho Chi Minh City	Tan Son Nhat International Airport	Terminated	

== Fleet ==
=== Current ===
As of March 2024, Lanmei Airlines had the following aircraft:

Aircraft	In service	Orders	Passengers	Notes
Airbus A320-200	0	—	180	Returned to lessor.
Total	0			

=== Former fleet ===
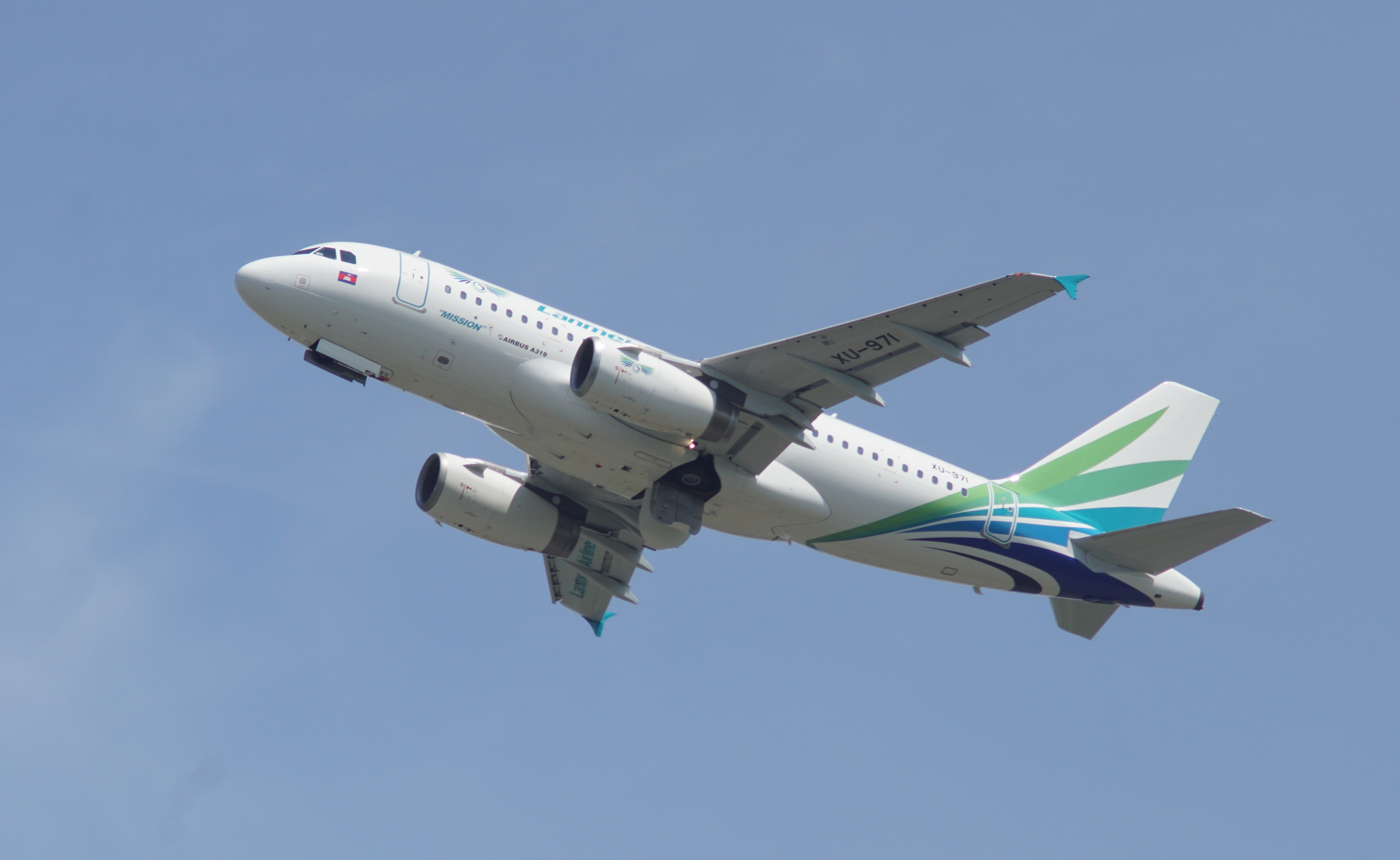
former Lanmei Airlines Airbus A319-100

Lanmei Airlines formerly also operated the following aircraft types:

Aircraft	Total	Introduced	Retired	Notes
Airbus A319-100	3	2017	2020	
Airbus A321-200	2	2017	2023	

== See also ==
- List of airlines of Cambodia
- Transport in Cambodia
