= Kampuchea Airlines =

Cambodian airline

IATA	ICAO	Call sign
E2	KMP	KAMPUCHEA
- Founded: 1997
- Ceased operations: 2004
- Hubs: Phnom Penh International Airport
- Headquarters: Phnom Penh, Cambodia
- Key people: Udom Tantiprasongchai Chairman

Kampuchea Airlines was an airline based in Phnom Penh, Cambodia, operating regional passenger services out of Phnom Penh International Airport.

== History ==
Kampuchea Airlines was operating Boeing 737-200 jetliners and ATR 72 turboprops during the early 1990s. In 1994 it was jointly operating scheduled services with S.K. Air, another air carrier. According to the August 13, 1994 joint Kampuchea Airlines-S.K. Air timetable, nonstop flights were being operated between Phnom Penh (PNH) and both Bangkok (BKK) and Ho Chi Minh City (SGN) with Boeing 737 jets with this timetable also stating that flights would be operated with British Aerospace BAe 146 jets from August 13 to September 10, 1994.

Kampuchea Airlines was shut down in 2004.

== Destinations in 1997 ==
According to its October 27, 1997 timetable, Kampuchea Airlines was serving the following destinations with Lockheed L-1011 and Boeing 727 jetliners:

- Bangkok
- Hong Kong
- Kuala Lumpur
- Macau
- Phnom Penh - Home base & hub
- Singapore

== Fleet ==
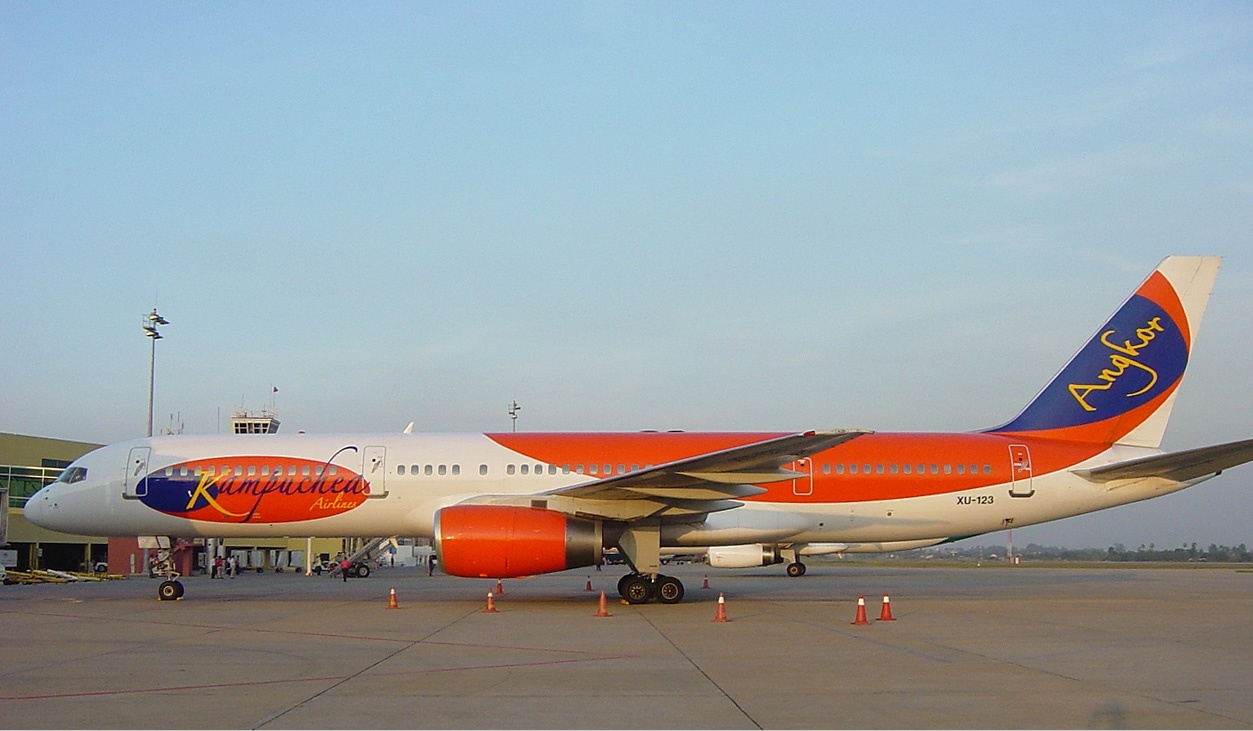
Kampuchea Airlines Boeing 757-200 at Phnom Penh International Airport

Over the years, Kampuchea Airlines operated the following aircraft types at various times:

Kampuchea Airlines fleet
Aircraft	Introduced	Retired
Antonov An-24	?	?
ATR-72	1993	?
Boeing 727-200	?	?
Boeing 737-200	1992	?
Boeing 757-200	2003	2004
BAe 146-100	1997	2004
Lockheed L-1011	1997	2004
Mil Mi-8 (helicopter)	?	?
Tupolev Tu-134	?	?

== Accidents and incidents ==
On February 25 1996, an Antonov An-24RV overran the runway at Ban Lung-Ratanakiri Airport causing the aircraft to crash into a building, all 42 occupants survived and there were no deaths on the ground.
