= Battambang Airport =

Airport in Cambodia

Battambang (Vealbekchan) Airport
- IATA: BBM; ICAO: VDBG

Summary
- Airport type: Public
- Serves: Battambang, Cambodia
- Elevation AMSL: 59 ft (18 m)
- Coordinates: 13°05′44″N 103°13′27″E

Map
- Location of airport in Cambodia

Runways
Direction	Length		Surface
Direction	m	ft	Surface
07/25	1,600	5,250	Asphalt
- Source: DAFIF

Battambang (Vealbekchan) Airport (Khmer: ព្រលានយន្តហោះវាលបែកចានខេត្តបាត់តំបង) (IATA: BBM, ICAO: VDBG) is an airport serving Battambang, the capital city of Battambang Province, Cambodia. The airport is located 3 kilometers away from Battambang's city center and has a total land area of 128.68 hectares.

== History ==
The airport was originally built in 1968 as an auxiliary airstrip for the Royal Khmer Aviation and was the second largest military airfield in the country. Following the outbreak of the Cambodian Civil War in May 1970, the new Khmer Air Force (KAF) was faced with both an escalation of hostlities and the increase in activity on his main Airbase at Pochentong near Phnom Penh, which led to the KAF Command's decision to move the Air Academy (École de l'Air; formerly, the Royal Flying School) and its Advanced Training Squadron in August that year to more quieter and less congested facilities at Battambang airfield, re-designated Airbase 201 (Base Aérienne 201 or BA 201). This enabled the KAF Air Academy and its training squadron to function unhindered until the fall of the Khmer Republic in April 1975, when Battambang airbase was taken over by the Khmer Rouge.

With the creation of the People's Republic of Kampuchea in the late 1970s, the airport continued to function but ended all flights in 1987 and was abandoned until 1993, when it was reactivated as a logistics base for UN flights in support of the UNTAC peacekeeping mission, hosting six Australian Army Aviation UH-60 Black Hawk helicopters. After the UN mission ended, the airport passed under the control of the new Cambodian government but was little used until 2018, when became once again a military airbase and was reopened for small, private aircraft flights. In early 2020 the airport was planned to reopen for domestic-commercial flights, although later in December that same year it was announced that the reopening plan was still under consideration.

== Facilities ==
The airport resides at an elevation of 60 feet (18 m) above mean sea level. It has one runway designed 07/25 with an asphalt surface measuring 1,600 by 40 metres (5,249 ft × 131 ft).

== Accidents and incidents ==
- On June 27, 1974, a Cambodia Air Commercial Boeing S.307B-1 Stratoliner with 6 crew members and 33 passengers on board departed from Battambang bound for Pochentong International Airport near Phnom Penh, but 3 minutes after takeoff, it lost power to three of its four engines and was forced to make an emergency landing in a rice paddy. The impact with the ground caused a fire that cost the lives of 19 of the 39 occupants of the flight.
- On December 25, 1974, a cargo flight using a Curtiss C-46A-10-CU Commando of Cambodian International Airlines took off from Battambang bound for Pochentong International Airport near Phnom Penh, but after about 130 km of flight, at the height of Bamnak, it crashed into the forest on the slope of a mountain named Phnom Aural, killing its two pilots.
