= Siem Reap International Airport =

Airport of Siem Reap, Cambodia (1932–2023)

Siem Reap International Airport អាកាសយានដ្ឋានអន្តរជាតិសៀមរាប Akasayeanatthan Antaracheat Siem Reap

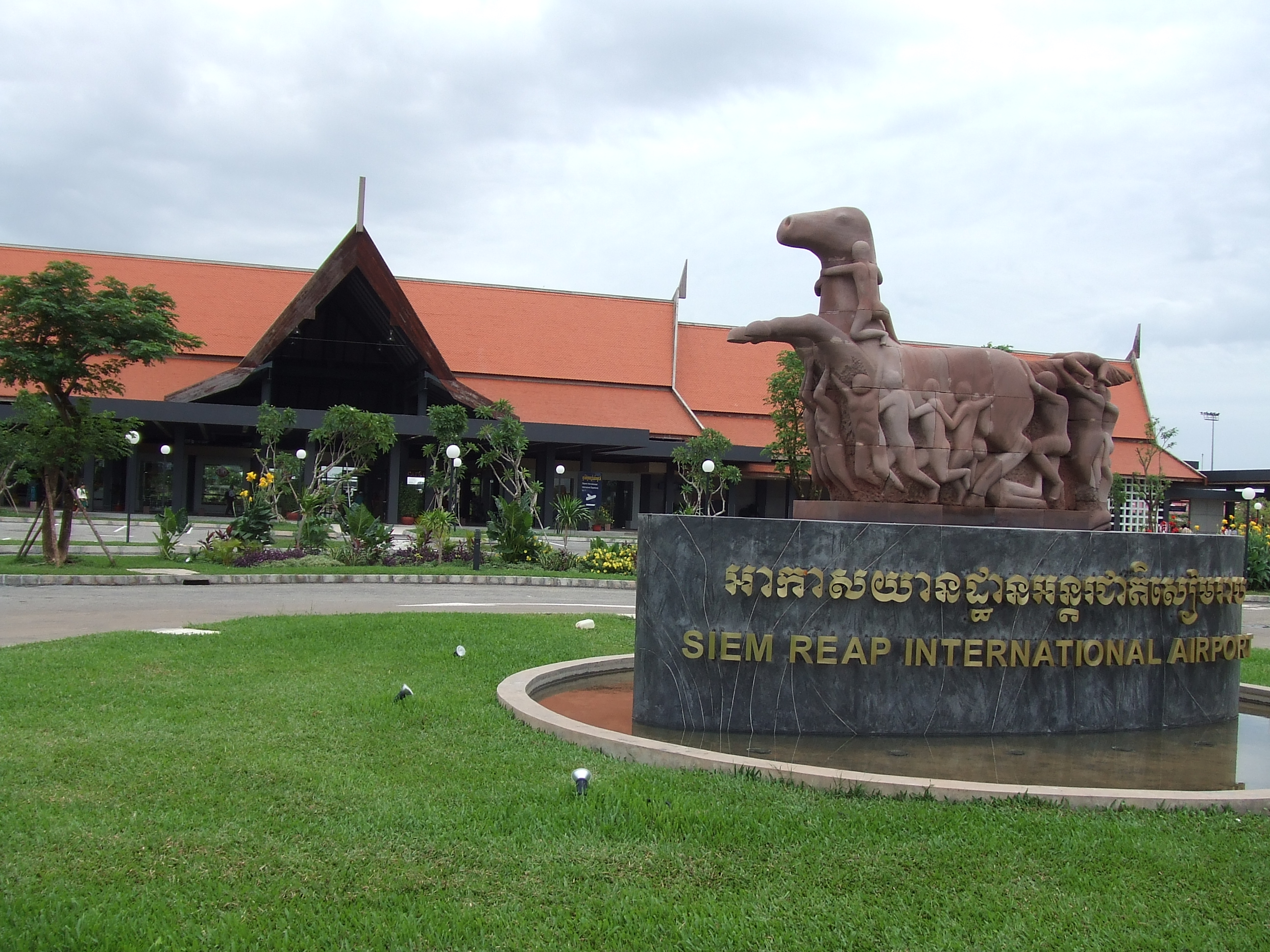
- IATA: REP; ICAO: VDSR

Summary
- Airport type: Defunct
- Owner: Cambodia Airports
- Operator: VINCI Airports
- Serves: Siem Reap, Cambodia
- Opened: 1932
- Closed: 15 October 2023
- Hub for: Siem Reap Airways (2000–2008)
- Elevation AMSL: 60 ft (18 m)
- Coordinates: 13°24′38″N 103°48′46″E
- Website: rep.cambodia-airports.aero

Map
- Location of airport in Cambodia

Runways
Direction	Length		Surface
Direction	m	ft	Surface
05/23	2,550	8,366	Concrete (closed)

Statistics (2022)
- Passenger movements: 372,000 ▲
- Aircraft movements: 4,773 ▲
- Source: www.vinci-airports.com

Siem Reap International Airport (IATA: REP, ICAO: VDSR) was an international airport that served Siem Reap and Angkor. It opened in 1932 and closed in 2023 upon the opening of Siem Reap–Angkor International Airport. It was the second-busiest airport in Cambodia after Phnom Penh International Airport.

== History ==
Siem Reap Airport opened in 1932 under French supervision. A modern terminal was inaugurated in 2006.

Due to increased traffic and pollution damage caused to Angkor Wat, in 2010, plans for replacing the airport with a larger airport further from the temple complex were announced. After delays due to the COVID-19 pandemic, in 2023, the Siem Reap–Angkor International Airport was opened and the Siem Reap International Airport was closed.

== Facilities ==
The airport was at an elevation of 60 feet (18 m) above mean sea level. It had one runway, designated 05/23, with a concrete surface measuring 2,550 by 45 metres (8,366 ft × 148 ft). On 28 August 2006, a new terminal opened.

Air traffic control was provided by CATS (Cambodia Air Traffic Services), with full approach and aerodrome VHF facilities housed in the control tower between the fire station and the domestic terminal. CATS were also responsible for clearing takeoffs and landings of tourist helicopters from the "Big Balloon" site, 3 kilometres (1.9 mi) away, near Angkor Wat. Helicopters Cambodia and Sokha Helicopters operated from the airport, with Sokha mainly operating from the Big Yellow Balloon site.

The airport was 6 kilometres (3.7 mi) outside Siem Reap, just off National Route 6 north. Runway alignments were 23 and 05, with only 23 being used for takeoff, due to flight restrictions over Angkor temple.

== Airfield ==
- Runway: 2,550 m (8,370 ft) long x 45 m (148 ft) width (with shoulders 2.5 m wide each).
- Parallel taxiway: length: 240 m (790 ft) width: 20 m (66 ft) and 10 metres of shoulders. Under construction: 1 (length: 600 metres, width: 25 metres and 15 metres of shoulders).
- Number of stands: 10

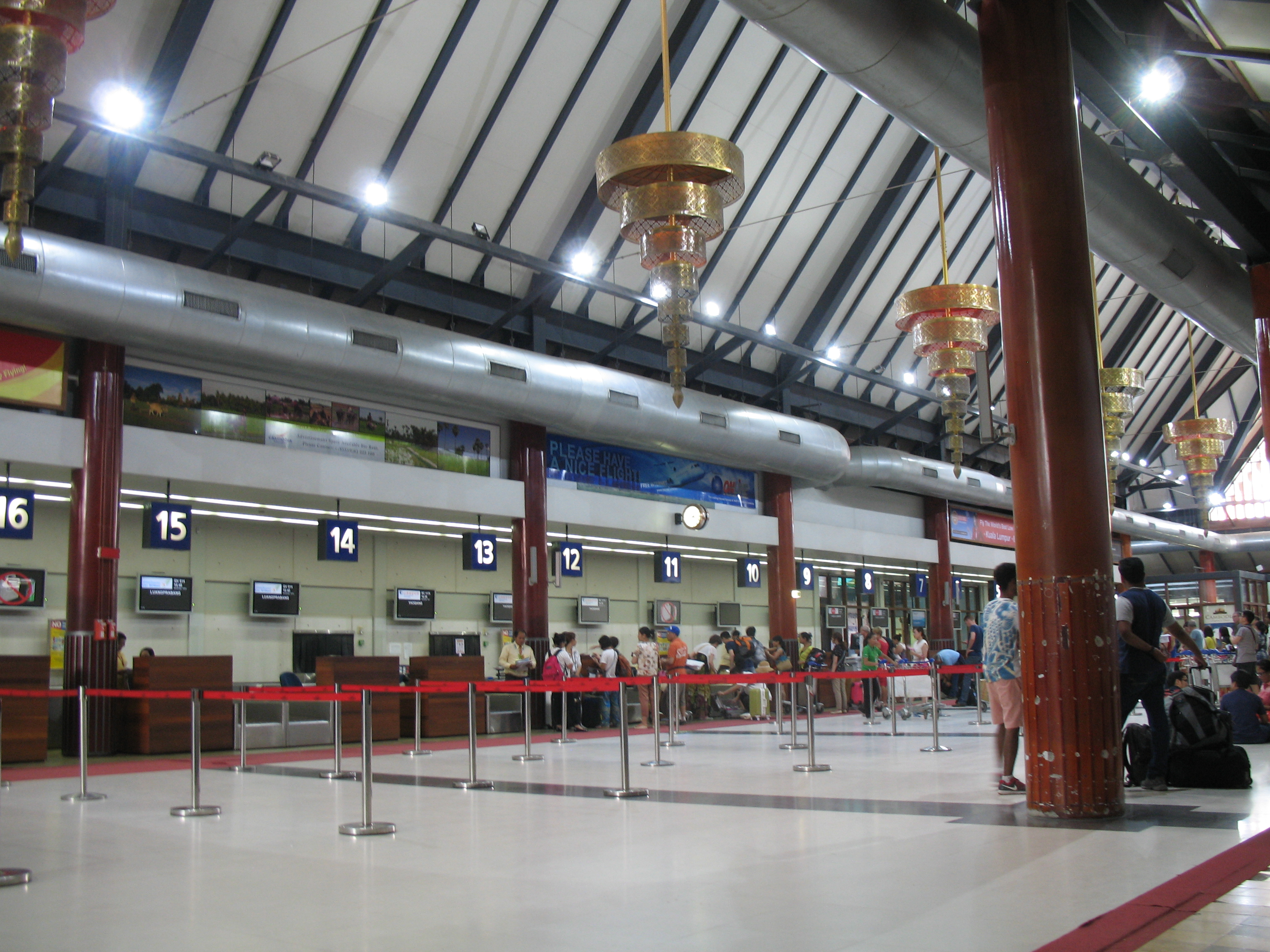
Interior view of Siem Reap International Airport

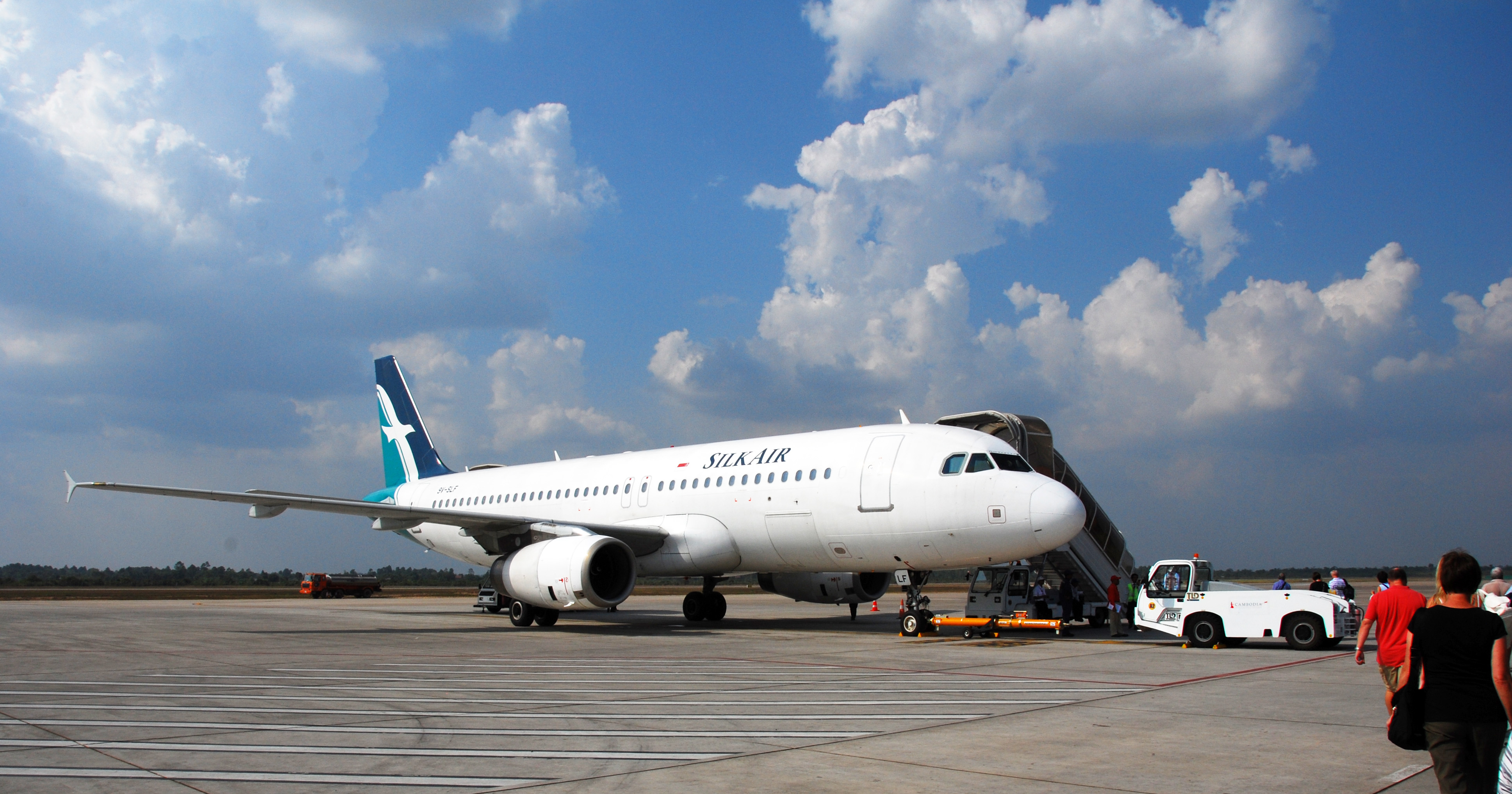
Apron area of the airport

== Former airlines and destinations ==
In November 2012, for one season, Condor operated service to/from Frankfurt using a Boeing 767. The outbound flight from Siem Reap operated via Phuket, while the inbound one was nonstop.

Airlines	Destinations
Bangkok Airways	Bangkok–Suvarnabhumi
Cambodia Angkor Air	Da Nang, Hanoi, Ho Chi Minh City, Phnom Penh, Sihanoukville, Vientiane
Thai AirAsia	Bangkok–Don Mueang
Vietnam Airlines	Hanoi, Ho Chi Minh City, Luang Prabang

== Statistics ==
Year	Passengers	Aircraft movements
2012	2,223,029	26,248
2013	2,663,337	31,590
2014	3,018,669	35,696
2015	3,296,513	37,296
2016	3,478,300	37,698
2017	4,209,000	43,568
2018	4,480,000	44,314
2019	3,926,000	39,750
2020	619,000	7,751
2021	2,000	161
2022	372,000	4,773

== Accidents and incidents ==
In August 2002, a Bangkok Airways ATR 72-200 skidded off the runway. The airport was closed for two days.

== See also ==
- List of airports in Cambodia
- Siem Reap–Angkor International Airport
- Battambang Airport
- Kampong Cham Airport
- Phnom Penh International Airport
