= List of bridges in Cambodia =

== Historical and architectural interest bridges ==
	Name	Khmer	Distinction	Length	Type	Carries Crosses	Opened	Location	Province	Ref.
1	Spean Toap	ស្ពានទ័ព	Northwest Royal Road	150 m (490 ft)	Masonry; 28 corbelled arches, laterite	Old National Road 68; Stueng Chas	12th century	Chong Kal District; 13°54′14.9″N 103°31′54.6″E	Oddar Meanchey	
2	Spean Praptos	ស្ពានព្រះទិស	South- east Royal Road	86 m (282 ft)	Masonry; 21 corbelled arches, laterite	Old National Highway 6 Chi Kraeng River	12th century	Chi Kraeng District; 13°07′35.7″N 104°20′21.3″E	Siem Reap	
3	Spean Memay	ស្ពានមេម៉ាយ	West Royal Road; Angkor; World Heritage Site (1992)	79 m (259 ft)	Masonry; 29 arches, laterite	Siem Reap River (former path)	12th century	Siem Reap; 13°26′43.6″N 103°45′40.0″E	Siem Reap	
4	Spean Ta Ong	ស្ពានតាអុង	East Royal Road	63 m (207 ft)	Masonry; 14 corbelled arches, laterite	Chi Kraeng River	12th century	Chi Kraeng District; 13°25′18.9″N 104°24′24.1″E	Siem Reap	
5	Spean Khvav	ស្ពានខ្វាវ		26 m (85 ft)	Masonry; 7 corbelled arches, laterite	East Royal Road	12th century	Chi Kraeng District; 13°25′10.3″N 104°29′05.7″E	Siem Reap	
6	Spean Thma	ស្ពានថ្ម	Angkor; World Heritage Site (1992)		Masonry; 14 corbelled arches, sandstone	Siem Reap River (former path)	15th century	Siem Reap; 13°26′45.8″N 103°52′46.1″E	Siem Reap	
7	Kampong Cham Bamboo Bridge	ស្ពានឫស្សីកោះប៉ែន	Dismantled and rebuilt each year	1,000 m (3,300 ft)	Trestle; Bamboo	Mekong		Kampong Cham; 11°58′27.4″N 105°27′41.8″E	Kampong Cham	
8	Diamond Gate Bridge demolished in 2012 rebuilt under the name "Twin Dragon Bridges"	ស្ពានពេជ្រ	Phnom Penh stampede		Suspension; Composite steel/concrete deck, concrete pylons	Road bridge Bassac River	2010	Phnom Penh–Koh Pich; 11°33′21.7″N 104°56′22.1″E	Phnom Penh	

== Major bridges ==
This table presents a non-exhaustive list of the road and railway bridges with spans greater than 100 metres (328 ft) or total lengths longer than 500 metres (1,640 ft).

	Name	Khmer	Span	Length	Type	Carries Crosses	Opened	Location	Province	Ref.
1	Neak Loeung Bridge	ស្ពានត្សឹបាសា	330 m (1,080 ft)	2,215 m (7,267 ft)	Cable-stayed; Concrete deck and pylons 155+330+155	National Highway 1 Mekong	2015	Neak Loeung; 11°16′33.3″N 105°16′44.9″E	Prey Veng; Kandal	
2	Koh Puos Bridge	ស្ពានកោះពស់	200 m (660 ft)	900 m (3,000 ft)	Box girder Prestressed concrete 110+200+110	Road bridge Bay of Kompong Som	2011	Sihanoukville–Koh Puos; 10°37′34.5″N 103°29′24.3″E	Sihanoukville	
3	Koh Norea Bridge	ស្ពានកោះនរា	180 m (590 ft)	483 m (1,585 ft)	Extradosed; Concrete box girder deck, concrete pylons 108+180+108	Road bridge Bassac River	2023	Phnom Penh–Koh Pich; 11°33′02.4″N 104°56′48.2″E	Phnom Penh	
4	Prek Tamak Bridge	ស្ពានព្រែកតាមាក់	170 m (560 ft)(x3)	1,060 m (3,480 ft)	Box girder Prestressed concrete 95+3x170+95	National Highway 8 Mekong	2010	Khsach Kandal District–Mukh Kampul District; 11°45′05.9″N 105°00′15.1″E	Kandal	(Note: Also called 3rd Cambodia–China Friendship Bridge.)
5	Chroy Changvar Bridge I	ស្ពានជ្រោយចង្វារ I	135 m (443 ft)	711 m (2,333 ft)	Box girder Steel; 65+135+65	Tonlé Sap	1966; 1995	Phnom Penh; 11°35′14.2″N 104°55′18.5″E	Phnom Penh	(Note: Also called Cambodian–Japanese Friendship Bridge, it was severely damaged during the civil war in 1972 and 1973 and remained closed until it reopened in February 1994.)
6	Prek Kdam Bridge		135 m (443 ft)(x3)	981 m (3,219 ft)	Box girder Prestressed concrete 75+3x135+75	National Highway 61; Tonlé Sap	2009	Ponhea Lueu District; 11°48′54.6″N 104°48′29.5″E	Kandal	(Note: Also called 2nd Cambodia–China Friendship Bridge.)
7	Chroy Changvar Bridge II	ស្ពានជ្រោយចង្វារ II	135 m (443 ft)(x3)	711 m (2,333 ft)	Box girder Prestressed concrete	Tonlé Sap	2014	Phnom Penh; 11°35′15.0″N 104°55′18.3″E	Phnom Penh	(Note: Also called 5th Cambodia–China Friendship Bridge.)
8	Stung Treng Bridge		135 m (443 ft)(x3)	1,731 m (5,679 ft)	Box girder Prestressed concrete 75+3x135+75	National Highway 64; Mekong	2015	Stung Treng; 13°31′38.2″N 105°56′06.8″E	Stung Treng	(Note: Also called 6th Cambodia–China Friendship Bridge.)
9	Takhmao Bridge	ស្ពានព្រែកសំរោង	135 m (443 ft)	855 m (2,805 ft)	Box girder Prestressed concrete 75+135+75	Phnom Penh Second Ring Road; Bassac River	2015	Ta Khmau Municipality–Phnom Penh; 11°28′07.3″N 104°57′37.4″E	Kandal; Phnom Penh	(Note: Also called 4th Cambodia–China Friendship Bridge.)
10	Anlong Chen Bridges		135 m (443 ft)	625 m (2,051 ft)	Box girder Prestressed concrete 75+135+75	Phnom Penh Third Ring Road; Bassac River	2023	Kampong Svay–Anloung Chen Island; 11°26′59.2″N 105°03′05.3″E	Kandal	
11	Kizuna Bridge	ស្ពានគីហ្សូណា	120 m (390 ft)(x7)	1,360 m (4,460 ft)	Box girder Prestressed concrete 80+7x120+80	National Highway 7 Mekong	2001	Kampong Cham; 11°59′06.5″N 105°28′11.4″E	Kampong Cham; Tboung Khmum	
12	Russey Keo Bridge	ស្ពានឬស្សីកែវ	120 m (390 ft)(x3)	504 m (1,654 ft)	Extradosed; Concrete box girder deck, 4 concrete pylons 72+3x120+72	Road bridge Tonlé Sap	2023	Phnom Penh; 11°36′34.0″N 104°55′16.2″E	Phnom Penh	
13	Monivong Bridge	ស្ពានព្រះមុនីវង្ស	118 m (387 ft)	269 m (883 ft)	Box girder Prestressed concrete Twin bridges 75+118+75	National Highway 1 Bassac River	1960s 2009	Phnom Penh; 11°31′52.2″N 104°55′58.9″E	Phnom Penh	
14	Phnom Penh-Areyksat Bridge planned			3,549 m (11,644 ft)	Cable-stayed	Road bridge Mekong; Tonlé Sap	2030	Phnom Penh-Khan Chroy Changvar-Arey Ksat; 11°34′33.6″N 104°56′41.7″E	Kandal; Phnom Penh	(Note: Also called Cambodia-South Korea Friendship Bridge.)
15	Koh Kong Bridge	ស្ពានកោះកុង		1,900 m (6,200 ft)	Beam; Prestressed concrete	National Highway 48; Kah Bpow River	2002	Khemarak Phoumin; 11°37′03.3″N 102°58′15.7″E	Koh Kong	
16	Kratié Bridge	ស្ពានក្រចេះ		1,761 m (5,778 ft)	Box girder Prestressed concrete	Road bridge Mekong	2026	Kratié; 12°25′54.4″N 106°01′29.1″E	Kratié	
17	Steung Trang-Krouch Chhmar Bridge	ស្ពានស្ទឹងត្រង់-ក្រូចឆ្មារ		1,131 m (3,711 ft)	Box girder Prestressed concrete	Road bridge Mekong	2021	Steung Trang district–Krouch Chhmar District; 12°16′08.2″N 105°33′11.0″E	Kampong Cham; Tboung Khmum	(Note: Also called 8th Cambodia–China Friendship Bridge.)
18	Sekong Bridge	ស្ពានសេកុង		1,057 m (3,468 ft)	Box girder Prestressed concrete	National Highway 7 Kong River	2008	Stung Treng; 13°32′15.8″N 105°59′24.4″E	Stung Treng	(Note: Also called 1st Cambodia–China Friendship Bridge.)
19	Prek Pnov Bridge	ស្ពានព្រែកព្នៅ		996 m (3,268 ft)	Box girder Prestressed concrete	Phnom Penh Third Ring Road; Tonlé Sap	2010	Phnom Penh; 11°39′29.0″N 104°52′05.7″E	Phnom Penh	
20	Stung Russei Chrum Bridge	ស្ពានស្ទឹងឫស្សីជ្រុម		530 m (1,740 ft)	Box girder Prestressed concrete	National road 10; Stung Russei Chrum	2025	road 10; 11°55′49.75″N 103°13′36.9″E	Koh Kong	
21	Koh Thom Bridge	ស្ពានមិត្តភាពកម្ពុជាចិនកោះធំ		417 m	Box girder Prestressed concrete	Bassac River	2017	Kaoh Thum District; 11°06′36.3″N 105°03′34.2″E	Kandal	(Note: Also called 7th Cambodia–China Friendship Bridge.)
22	Chak Angrae Kraom-Prek Pra Bridge	ស្ពានចាក់អង្រែក្រោម-ព្រែកប្រា		845.70 m	Box girder Prestressed concrete	Bassac River	2028	Khan Mean Chey-Khan Chbar Ampov; 11°29′49″N 104°56′43″E	Phnom Penh	
23	Dei Edth-Thmor Kor Bridge	ស្ពានដីឥដ្ឋ-ថ្មគរ		1600 m	Box girder Prestressed concrete	Mekong River	2028	Lvea Aem District-Kien Svay District; 11°30′15″N 105°6′4″E	Kandal	

== See also ==
- Transport in Cambodia
- Rail transport in Cambodia
- Geography of Cambodia
- List of rivers of Cambodia
- List of crossings of the Mekong River

== Notes and references ==
- Notes
- Nicolas Janberg. "International Database for Civil and Structural Engineering". Structurae.com.
- Others references
