= Ancient roads in Cambodia =

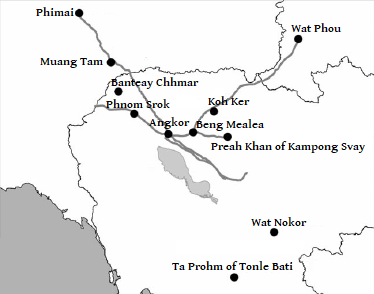
Map of the ancient Khmer road system radiating from Angkor, showing major royal highways.

Ancient roads in Cambodia refers to the transport networks that developed in the territory of present-day Cambodia from the early centuries CE to the end of the Khmer Empire in the 14th century. These systems combined waterways, canals, and overland routes, and were essential for the movement of goods, armies, and religious pilgrims.

In the Funan period (1st–6th centuries CE), transport centred on man-made canals that linked inland settlements with maritime trade. Under Chenla (6th–8th centuries CE), river corridors remained dominant, but inscriptions suggest the emergence of inland tracks. By the Angkorian period (9th–14th centuries CE), transport had become highly systematised, with raised causeways, corbelled bridges, and an expanding highway network. The reign of Jayavarman VII (c. 1181–1218) marked the peak of this development, when royal roads were lined with shrines, hospitals, and monumental bridges, creating one of the most extensive transport systems in premodern Southeast Asia.This progression from canals to highways reflects a steady increase in organisational complexity over more than a millennium

== Funan (1st–6th centuries CE) ==
Transport in the Funan Kingdom was dominated by an extensive system of man-made canals. Chinese accounts describe Funan's rulers constructing waterways that connected settlements in the Mekong Delta to the sea. Archaeological work at Óc Eo has revealed canal alignments over 30 kilometres long, linking inland centres such as Angkor Borei with maritime routes to India and China.

These canals supported both irrigation and communication, enabling the transport of agricultural produce, craft goods, and imported luxuries. Scholars argue that this large-scale integration of hydraulic engineering and movement laid the foundation for the transport systems of later Cambodian states.

== Chenla (7th–8th centuries CE) ==
With the decline of Funan, political centres shifted inland under Chenla, where transport depended primarily on the Mekong and its tributaries. Capitals such as Sambor Prei Kuk were connected to the delta through these waterways, which continued to serve as the main corridors for movement and exchange.

Inscriptions from this period mention land grants linked to shrines and pathways, providing some of the earliest evidence for organised overland communication in Cambodia. Although less developed than later Angkorian roads, these routes suggest a gradual extension of transport beyond rivers, marking a transition from the canal-based systems of Funan toward the integrated road and bridge networks of the Angkor period.

== Angkor period (9th–14th centuries CE) ==
=== Early development (9th–11th centuries) ===
The foundation of the Khmer Empire in the 9th century CE marked the beginning of formal overland road construction. While rivers remained crucial for the transport of heavy goods, successive kings invested in raised causeways and stone bridges that extended Angkor's reach into the surrounding provinces.

Under Suryavarman I (r. 1006–1050), laterite embankments were laid across floodplains to create durable highways, while corbelled-arch bridges provided permanent crossings of seasonal rivers. Surviving examples include the early phases of Spean Praptos and Spean Thma, which illustrate how Khmer stone masonry techniques were adapted to transport infrastructure.

Archaeological surveys suggest that several of the great royal road alignments, later monumentalised by Jayavarman VII, were already established during this period. These routes formed the first stages of the hub-and-spoke network later expanded under his reign, complementing Angkor's canal and reservoir systems to create an integrated network of land and water transport.

=== Jayavarman VII (late 12th–13th centuries) ===
The reign of Jayavarman VII (c. 1181–1218) marked the culmination of Angkorian road building. While many of the major road alignments were already in place by the 11th century, his reign saw their monumental expansion and integration into a single, coordinated system. Following the Cham invasions of the 1170s, Jayavarman enlarged the network and furnished it with civic and religious infrastructure. Roads served multiple purposes: they facilitated the movement of officials, armies, and traders, while also projecting his authority as a Buddhist ruler committed to the welfare of his subjects.

Several highways radiated outward from Angkor: north toward Phimai, northwest to Banteay Chhmar, south to the Mekong basin, and east to Preah Khan of Kompong Svay. The East Royal Road in particular has been documented in detail, revealing a dense sequence of infrastructure that illustrates the sophistication of Jayavarman's transport system.

Roadside shrines known as dharmasala or “fire houses” were placed at intervals of about 12–15 km, offering shelter for travellers and ritual space for sacred fire. Hospitals (arogayasala) were established along the same routes, with 102 recorded across the empire, each including a chapel, water tank, and quarters for attendants.

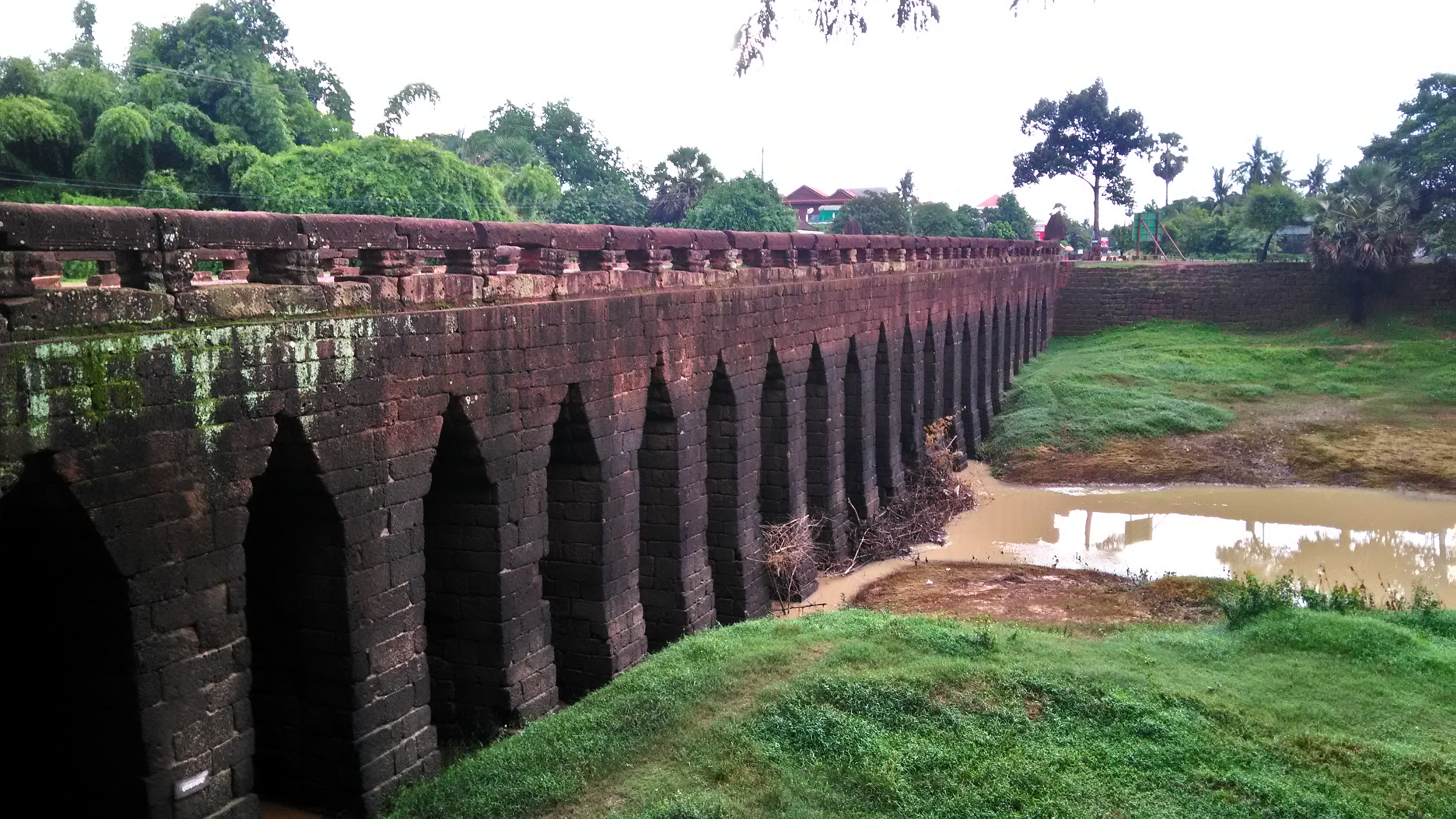
Spean Praptos, one of the largest surviving Angkorian bridges, mentioned in the text.

The East Royal Road was also notable for its monumental bridges. The most impressive, Spean Praptos, measures over 85 m and incorporates more than twenty corbelled arches. Uchida and colleagues identified 25 such bridges along the route, built with sandstone sourced both from Phnom Kulen and from local quarries, showing a decentralised approach to construction. Lidar surveys have since revealed additional embankments, shrines, and hospitals along this road, confirming that it functioned as the backbone of Angkor's eastern frontier and as a direct link to provincial centres. By combining waterways with such formal highways, Jayavarman created one of the most extensive transport systems in premodern Southeast Asia.

== Legacy and conservation ==
Although Angkor's political power declined after the 14th century, many of its roads and bridges remained in use for centuries, serving local communities and travellers. Recent lidar surveys have revealed additional embankments, shrines, and hospitals hidden beneath forest cover, demonstrating that significant portions of the transport network survive beneath the modern landscape.

Several monumental bridges, including Spean Praptos, have been stabilised or restored, and Cambodia's heritage agencies continue to monitor their condition. UNESCO recognises these transport systems as integral to the Angkor World Heritage Site, highlighting their role not only in Khmer history but also in the global study of premodern infrastructure.
