= Siem Reap municipality =

Municipality in Cambodia

Siem Reap municipality ក្រុងសៀមរាប Krong Siem Reap
- Municipality
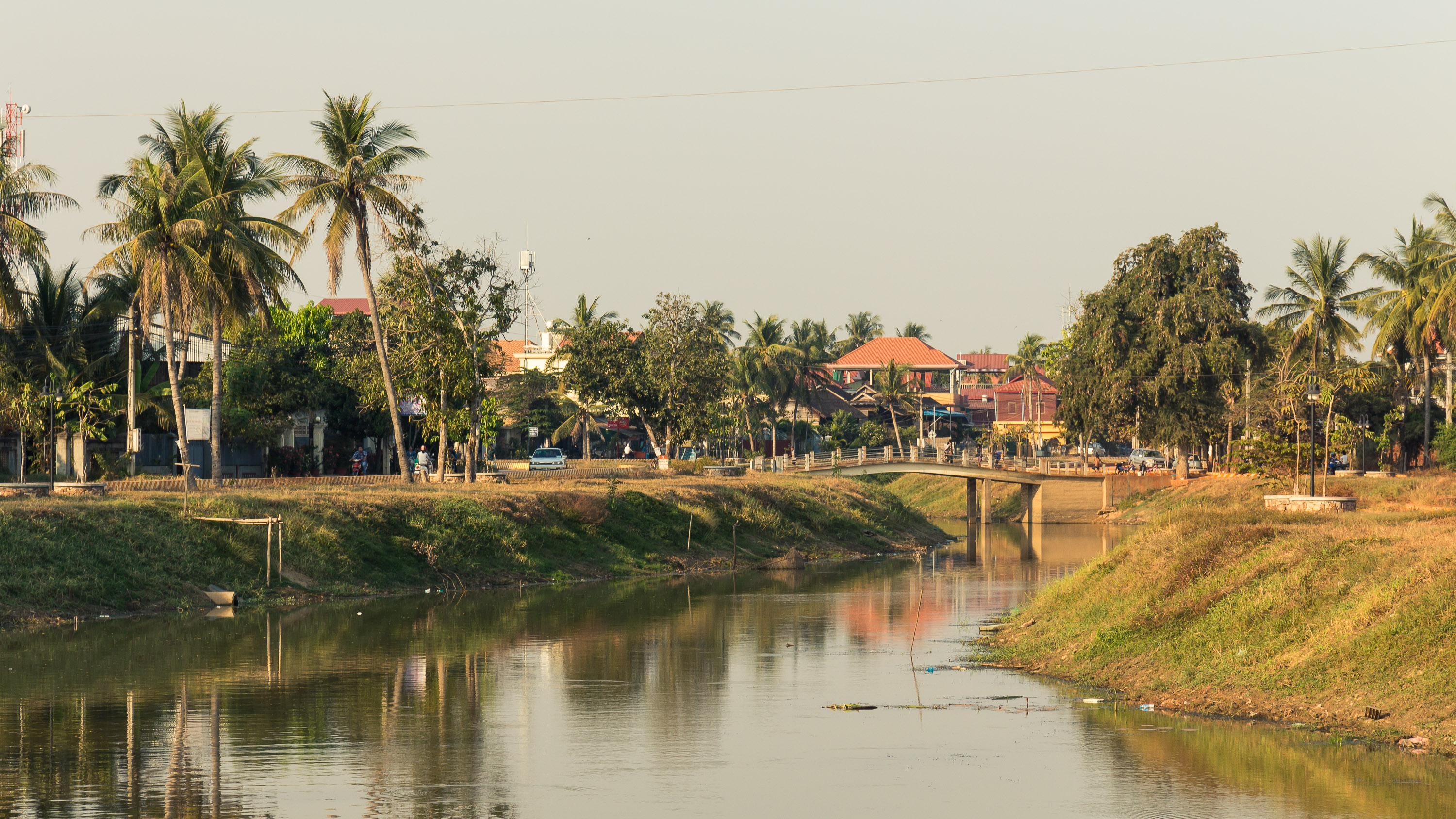
- Siem Reap River

- Municipality location in Siem Reap Province
- Coordinates: 13°21′42″N 103°51′32″E
- Country: Cambodia
- Province: Siem Reap
- Quarters: 12
- Villages: 99
- Capital: Siem Reap

Government
  - Type: City municipality

Area
  - Total: 472.73 km^{2} (182.52 sq mi)

Population (2019)
  - Total: 245,494
- Time zone: UTC+7 (ICT)
- District Code: 1710

Siem Reap municipality (Khmer: ក្រុងសៀមរាប) is a municipality (krong) in Siem Reap Province, Cambodia. It covers an area of approximately 472.73 km^{2} (182.52 sq mi) and had a population of 245,494 in 2019. It is subdivided into 12 quarters and 99 villages. The Siem Reap River flows through the municipality. The city of Siem Reap serves as the capital of the province. Parts of the municipality form part of the Angkor archeological park and heritage site.

== Geography ==
Siem Reap is one of the two municipalities (krong) of Siem Reap province, Cambodia. It covers a total area of approximately 472.73 km^{2} (182.52 sq mi), of which 253.81 km^{2} (98.00 sq mi) was classified as forest land, including 119.07 km^{2} (45.97 sq mi) of flooded forests, 122.87 km^{2} (47.44 sq mi) as cultivation land, and 96.05 km^{2} (37.09 sq mi) as constructed land in 2009.

The city of Siem Reap is the capital of the Siem Reap province. The municipality is situated to the north of Tonlé Sap Lake, with elevations of approximately 10 to 15 m (33 to 49 ft) above sea level. The Siem Reap River flows through the municipality connecting the Angkor area with Tonlé Sap Lake. Originating in the Phnom Kulen area, the river passes through the city of Siem Reap and flows for 85 km (53 mi) before discharging into the lake.

== Administration ==
The municipality is headed by a municipal governor. The municipality is subdivided into 12 quarters (sangkat) – Sla Kram, Svay Dankum, Kouk Chak, Sala Kamreuk, Nokor Thum, Chreav, Chong Khnies, Sngkat Sambuor, Siem Reab, Srangae, Krabei Riel, and Tuek Vil. The municipal administration office is located approximately 7 km (4.3 mi) from the sangkat office of Sla Kram, 5.5 km (3.4 mi) from Svay Dankum, 3 km (1.9 mi) from Kouk Chak, 7 km (4.3 mi) from Sala Kamreuk, 10 km (6.2 mi) from Nokor Thum, 18.5 km (11.5 mi) from Chreav, 10 km (6.2 mi) from Chong Khnies, 5.5 km (3.4 mi) from Sngkat Sambuor, 7.5 km (4.7 mi) from Siem Reab, 17 km (11 mi) from Srangae, 9.5 km (5.9 mi) from Krabei Riel, and 6 km (3.7 mi) from Tuek Vil. The 12 quarters are further subdivided into 99 villages (phum).

Administrative divisions
No.	Code	Sangkat (សង្កាត់)	ភូមិ (village)
1	1710-01	Sla Kram សង្កាត់ស្លក្រាម	ស្លក្រាម(Sla Kram), បឹងដូនប៉ា(Boeng Donpa), ចុងកៅស៊ូ(Chongkaosou), ដកពោធិ៍(Dak Pou), បន្ទាយចាស់(Banteay Chas), ទ្រាំង(Treang), មណ្ឌល៣(Mondol Bei), ធ្លកអណ្តូង(Thlok Angdoung)
2	1710-02	Svay Dankum សង្កាត់ស្វាយដង្គំ	ភ្ញាជ័យ(Phnhea Chey), កន្ដ្រក(Kantrork), គោកក្រសាំង(Kouk Krorsang), ស្វាយព្រៃ(Svay Preae), ពោធិ៍បុស្ស(Po Bos), ថ្មី(Thmei), ស្វាយដង្គំ(Svay Dangkum), សាលាកន្សែង(Sala Kanseng), គ្រួស(Kruos), វិហារចិន(Vihear Chen), ស្ទឹងថ្មី(Stueng Thmei), មណ្ឌល១(Mondol 1), មណ្ឌល២(Mondol 2), តាភុល(Ta Phul)
3	1710-03	Kouk Chak សង្កាត់គោកចក	ត្រពាំងសេះ(Trapeang Ses), វាល(Veal), ទក្សិណខាងត្បូង(Teaksen Khang Tbong), គោកតាចាន់(Kuok Ta Chan), ខ្វៀន(Khvien), គោកបេង(Kouk Beng), គោកត្នោត(Kouk Tnot), នគរក្រៅ(Nokor Krau)
4	1710-04	Sala Kamreuk សង្កាត់សាលាកំរើក	វត្ដបូព៌(Wat Bo), វត្ដស្វាយ(Wat Svay), វត្ដដំណាក់(Wat Damnak), សាលាកំរើក(Sala Kamreuk), ជន្លង់(Chunlong), តាវៀន(Ta Vien), ត្រពាំងត្រែង(Trapeang Treng)
5	1710-05	Nokor Thum សង្កាត់នគរធំ	រហាល(Rohal), ស្រះស្រង់ខាងជើង(Sras Srang Khang Cheung), ស្រះស្រង់ខាងត្បូង(Sras Srang Khang Tbaung), ក្រវ៉ាន់(Kravan), អារក្សស្វាយ(Areaks Svay), អញ្ចាញ(Anhchanh)
6	1710-06	Chreav សង្កាត់ជ្រាវ	ជ្រាវ(Chreav), ខ្នារ(Khnar), បុស្សក្រឡាញ់(Bos Kralanh), តាចេក(Ta Chek), វាល(Veal), ក្រសាំង(Krasang), បឹង(Boeng)
7	1710-07	Chong Knies សង្កាត់ចុងឃ្នៀស	ភូមិទី១(Phum I), ភូមិទី២(Phum II), ភូមិទី៣(Phum III), ភូមិទី៤(Phum IV), ភូមិទី៥(Phum V), ភូមិទី៦(Phum VI), ភូមិទី៧(Phum VII)
8	1710-08	Sambuor សង្កាត់សំបួរ	ព្នៅ(Phnov), សំបួរ(Sambuor), វាល(Veal), ជ្រៃ(Chrey), តាគង់(Ta Kong)
9	1710-09	Siem Reab សង្កាត់សៀមរាប	ពោធិបន្ទាយជ័យ(Pou Banteay Chey), ភ្នំក្រោម(Phnom Krom), ប្រឡាយ(Pralay), កក្រាញ់(Kakranh), ក្រសាំងរលើង(Krasang Roleung), ស្ពានជ្រាវ(Spean Chreav), អារញ្ញ(Aranh), ត្រៀក(Triek)
10	1710-10	Srangae សង្កាត់ស្រង៉ែ	កសិកម្ម(Kaksekam), ថ្នល់(Thnal), រការធំ(Roka Thom), ព្រៃធំ(Prey Thom), ស្រង៉ែ(Srongae), ចន្លោង(Chanlaong), តាចក(Ta Chork)
11	1710-12	Krabei Riel សង្កាត់ក្របីរៀល	តារស់(Ta Ros), រកា(Roka), ព្រៃពោធិ៍(Prey Pou), ទទា(Totea), ក្រសាំង(Krasang), ពពិស(Popis), ត្រពាំងវែង(Trapeang Veng), គោកដូង(Kouk Doung), បឹង(Boeng), ប្រម៉ា(Prama), ខ្នារ(Khnar), ព្រៃក្រូច(Prey Krouch)
12	1710-13	Tuek Vil សង្កាត់ទឹកវិល	គោកដូង(Kouk Dong), សណ្ដាន់(Sandan), ជ្រៃ(Chrey), ប្រយុទ្ធ(Prayut), បន្ទាយឈើ(Banteay Chheu), ទឹកវិល(Tuek Vil), ប្រីយ៍ចាស់(Prei Chas), ទឹកថ្លា(Tuek Thla), ប្រីយ៍ថ្មី(Prei Thmei), ជ័យ(Chey)

== Demographics ==
According to the 1998 census, the Siem Reap municipality had a population of 119,528, including 58,551 males and 60,977 females. The area had 20,985 households, with an average household size of 5.6 persons. According to the 2008 census, it had a population of 230,714. As per the 2019 census, the population was 245,494, including 120,538 males and 124,956 females. The municipality had 56,107 households, with an average household size of 4.4 persons.

== Culture and economy ==
In 2008, approximately 37% of families in the municipality were engaged primarily in agriculture, accounting for 12,614 families. About 10,604 of these families were primarily engaged in rice cultivation. Other activities included fishing, animal husbandry, and non-timber forest produce collection. Approximately 20% of the remaining families were engaged trade, and 35% in other services. In 2008, rice was cultivated across 5,916 ha (14,620 acres) during the wet season and 3,316 ha (8,190 acres) during the dry season.

=== Angkor ===
The Angkor Archaeological Park, a UNESCO World Heritage Site, lies to the north of the city of Siem Reap. It contains the remains of the old capital Khmer Empire dating between 9th and 14th centuries. The archaeological region extends from the Phnom Kulen in the north to the Tonlé Sap Lake in the south. Parts of the quarters of Kouk Chak, Nokor Thum, and Tuek Vil, of the municipality form part of the southern edge of the Angkor area.
