= Angkorian Road System =

Angkorian roads were a network of raised earthen highways constructed across mainland Southeast Asia during the height of the Khmer Empire (9th–15th centuries C.E.) Extending for more than 1,000 kilometres, the roads connected Angkor, the imperial capital in present day Cambodia, to distant provincial centres and frontier regions. The roads worked alongside river transportation to link the capital with resource zones and provincial hubs across Cambodia, Laos and Thailand. Waterborne transport continued to carry bulk goods, while the roads enabled faster movement of people, high-value goods and information. This network of roads was one of the most extensive transportation systems in premodern Southeast Asia.

== Overview ==
The main roads ran broadly perpendicular to major rivers, thus improving year round movement between Angkor and the inland centres, which were less accessible by boat. The roads lay mainly north of Tonle Sap River and connected several river basins, such as the Mun, Mekong and Tonle Sap. There were 6 main raised earthen arteries totalling over 1000 km. Like Roman roads, Angkorians built their roads mostly in long, straight sections. Unlike the Roman roads, the surfaces were earthen embankments rather than stone paving. The eastern roads accommodated carts, mounted travel, elephants and foot traffic.

== Development ==
Jayavarman VII (r.1150 - 1160) is often associated with the road system. However archaeological, epigraphic and textual evidence shows that Khmer roads were established in 3 stages.

The first stage was pre-Angkorian, from the 6th to the 8th centuries C.E. Routes that became main thoroughfares in the Angkor period have evidence of use during the Funan and Chenla periods, in particular the Southeastern Road towards Sambor Prei Kuk, and the Northeastern Road towards Vat Phu.

In the 11th century C.E., under Suryavarman (r. 1006 - 1050), many routes were formalised alongside the construction of bridges and temples.

During the 12th century C.E., both Suryavarman II (r. 1113 - 1150) and Jayavarman VII oversaw improvements to existing roads, the expansion of the road network and the equipping of it with the addition of masonry resthouses, all of which supported trade, military expeditions and pilgrimages.

== Construction ==
Roads were built as raised earthen causeways without stone paving. Bridges were typically corbelled laterite structures, sometimes featuring decorative elements or sandstone balustrades. This design allowed for rapid seasonal construction using readily available materials and facilitated straightforward upkeep. Bridge dams, like the Spean Praptos (Kompong Ldei) combined water controlled functions, as well as transport.

== Routes ==
=== Northwestern Road ===
The Northwestern Road connected Angkor to Phimai, a distance of about 225 kilometres. Seventeen laterite fire shrines (dharmaśālās) along this road correspond to stations recorded on the Inscription of Preah Khan K.908, and date to the late 12th century to early 13th century C.E. The road offered overland access to the Mun River basin and related trade. Along the northwestern road single-building fire shrines (dharmaśālās) are found (attributed to Jayavarman VII.) This combination is particularly well documented on the northwestern route, where seventeen shrines correspond to stations recorded in the Preah Khan inscription K.908.

=== Northeastern Road ===
The Northeastern Road, which was active by the 9th century C.E. connected Angkor to Vat Phu, in modern day Laos, and the Mekong corridor. It provided access to the Lao uplands, as well as access to copper and gold resources.

=== Western Road ===
The Western Road circumvents the Tonle Sap floodplain. There is less evidence here of state sanctioned masonry features, which distinguished it from the Northwestern, Eastern and Northeastern roads.

=== Eastern Royal Road ===
The Eastern Royal Road connected Angkor with Beng Melea and Preah Khan. Archaeological surveys have documented a sequence of infrastructure along this highway, including seven temples d'étape (resthouse temples), six fire shrines (dharmaśālās), and twenty-five masonry bridges. It is the only route that contains both the two main styles of resthouses, namely the multicomponent temples d'etape (commonly attributed to Suryavarman II), and later single building fire-shrines, or dharmasalas (commonly attributed to Jayavarman VII). Spacing between these resthouses is approximately 12-15 kilometres.

Preah Khan of Kompong Svay functioned as a regional hub for temple construction and resource extraction, and the road reinforced its integration into Angkor's political and economic system.

== Features ==
=== Resthouses ===
A key feature of the Angkorian road system was the construction of masonry structures, often referred to as "resthouses" in archaeological literature, the typology and distribution of which provide significant evidence for dating road construction and understanding state administrative control. Two types of "resthouses" have been identified, dharmaśālās (fire shrines or houses of merit) and temples d'étape (literally "stage temples," meaning resthouses for stages of a journey). The placement of these structures provides a relative chronology for the roads themselves. The presence of the temples d'étape indicates that the Eastern Road was established by the mid 12th century C.E., while the Northwestern Road was clearly a major thoroughfare prior to the late 12th century addition of its dharmaśālās.

==== Dharmaśālās ====
The first of these, dharmaśālās, are represented by a series of seventeen laterite monuments located along the Northwestern Road. These shrines are epigraphically linked to the buildings mentioned in the Inscription of Preah Khan stele K.908[10] and are securely dated to the late 12th century C.E, contemporaneous with the reign of Jayavarman VII. Contrasting this, three dharmaśālās located on the Eastern Road don't align with the numbers for the other two routes listed on the Preah Khan stele. Because of this, the Eastern Road dharmaśālās are generally considered to be contemporary, or near contemporary, with their northwestern counterparts.

==== Temples d'étape ====
Temples d'étape are architecturally distinct from dharmaśālās and have been found exclusively on the Eastern Road towards Preah Khan. These are larger, multicomponent complexes. Typological analysis dates their construction to the early to mid 12th century C.E., within the reign of Suryavarman II.

=== Water Tanks ===
Rectilinear earthen tanks (trapeang) were constructed along Angkorian roads and functioned to provide regularly spaced water points for travellers and their animals. According to systematic mapping the water tanks were spaced roughly 1.5 - 2.5 kilometres apart, although absolute dating is difficult because the features are earthen and often re-excavated. Nonetheless evidence that is available suggests that they were installed contemporaneously with the creation of each road.

=== Bridges ===
Masonry bridges were widespread along Angkorian roads, especially within 150 kilometres from the capital city of Angkor. They range from small culverts to major river crossings. Spean Praptos, near Kompong Kdei, is currently still standing and is approximately 87 metres long, 9 metres high and 5 metres wide. It functioned as a retaining bridge, illustrating the integration of transport and hydraulic management.

=== Jayavarman VII ===
Jayavarman VII (r.1150 - 1160) has historically been credited with the Angkorian road system, however, the archaeological record and available inscriptions indicate that the major road arteries well pre-date his reign. The stele inscription of Preah Khan links Jayavarman VII specifically to a programme of fire shrine rest houses (dharmaśālās), hospital chapels and major temple projects, rather than to the original construction of roads and bridges.

=== Significance ===
During the 12th - 13th centuries C.E., the road system effectively facilitated transport for the Angkorian state. However in the 14th - 15th centuries C.E., the armies of the Ayutthaya Kingdom used the Western and Northwestern roads for military campaigns against Angkor. Some scholars have argued that this pre-existing infrastructure ultimately left the empire vulnerable to invasion and was a factor in its decline.

Segments of the road network appear to have remained in use after the Cambodian capital's relocation to its current location in Phnom Penh, with bridges and embankments incorporated into later transport and hydraulic use.

== See also ==
- Khmer Empire
- Jayavarman VII
- Angkor
- Khmer architecture
- Spean Praptos
- Vat Phou
