= National Highway 8 (Cambodia) =

Cambodian national highway

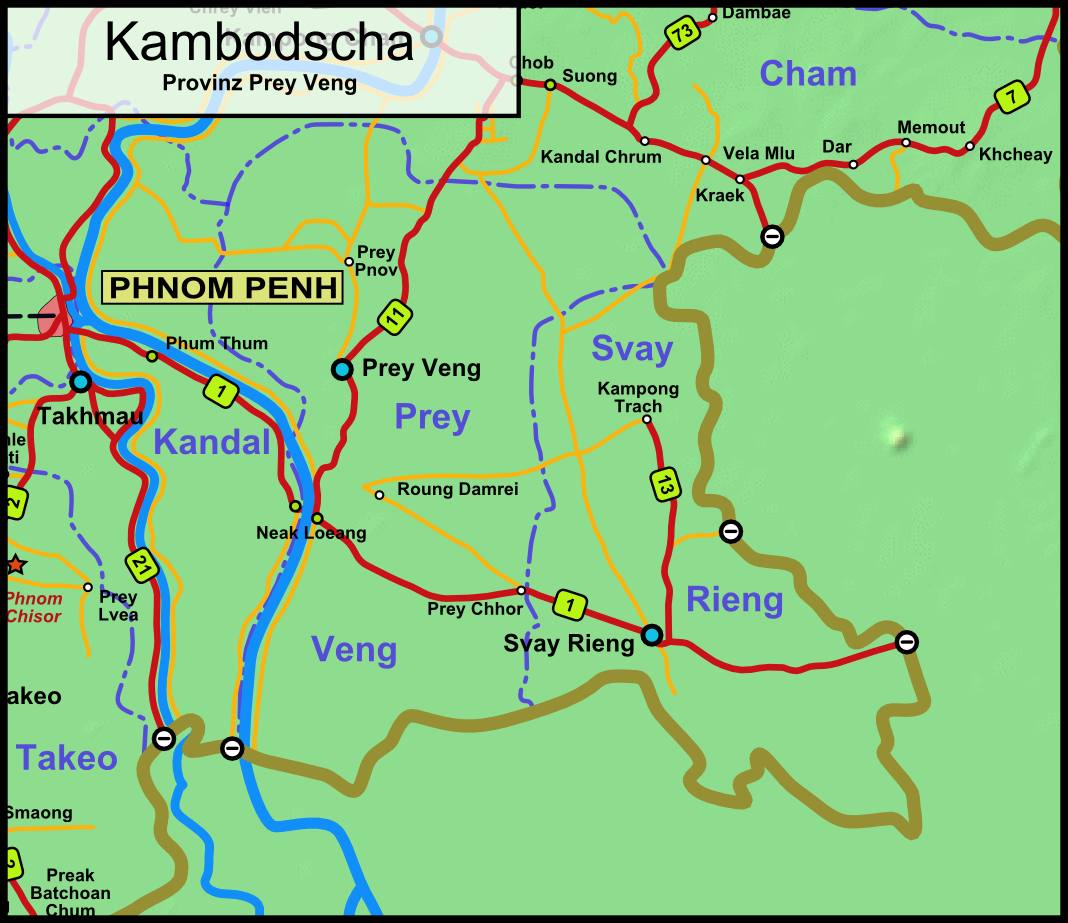
Roads in Prey Veng Province.

National Road No. 8 (10008) is a 90 km (56 mi) long national highway in the Prey Veng province of Cambodia.

The road begins at a junction with National Highway 6A, then crosses over the Mekong river on the Prek Tamak Bridge. It turns east towards the village of Amphil, near the Cambodia–Vietnam border, and then ends at a junction with National Highway 7.
