= Corbel arch =

Architectural technique

Basic principle of the corbeled arch design (a "false arch")

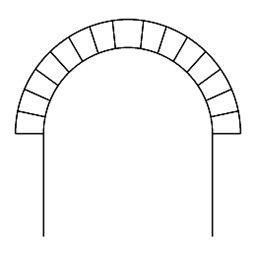
In contrast, a semicircular arch relies on wedge-shaped voussoirs held in compression by a central keystone (a "true arch")

A corbel arch (or corbeled / corbelled arch) is an arch-like construction method that uses the architectural technique of corbeling to span a space or void in a structure, such as an entranceway in a wall or as the span of a bridge. A corbel vault uses this technique to support the superstructure of a building's roof.

A corbel arch is constructed by offsetting successive horizontal courses of stone (or brick) beginning at the springline of the walls (the point at which the walls break off from verticality to form an arc toward the apex at the archway's center) so that they project towards the archway's center from each supporting side, until the courses meet at the apex of the archway (often the last gap is bridged with a flat stone). For a corbeled vault covering, the technique is extended in three dimensions along the lengths of two opposing walls.

Although an improvement in load-bearing efficiency over the post and lintel design, corbeled arches are not entirely self-supporting structures, and the corbeled arch is sometimes termed a false arch for this reason. Different from "true" arches, "false" or corbelled arches are built of horizontally laid stones or bricks, not of wedge-shaped voussoirs converging towards, and being held together by a central keystone. Unlike "true" arches, not all of the structure's tensile stresses caused by the weight of the superstructure are transformed into compressive stresses.

Corbel arches and vaults require significantly thickened walls and an abutment of other stone or fill to counteract the effects of gravity, which otherwise would tend to collapse each side of the archway inwards.

Some arches use a stepped style, keeping the block faces rectangular, while other form or select them to give the arch smooth edges, usually with a pointed shape.

== Use in historical cultures ==
Corbelling is a technique first applied by the ancient Egyptians and Chaldeans.

=== Ireland ===
The Newgrange passage tomb, built sometime between 3200 and 2500 BC during the Neolithic period, has an intact corbel arch (vault) supporting the roof of the main chamber.

The medieval buildings of the monastery at Skellig Michael are also constructed using this method.

=== Ancient Egypt ===
During the Fourth Dynasty reign of Pharaoh Sneferu (c. 2600 BC), the Ancient Egyptian pyramids used corbel vaults in some of their chambers. These monuments include the Meidum Pyramid (around 2600 BC), the Bent Pyramid (c. 2600 BC) and its satellite pyramid, and the Red Pyramid (c. 2590 BC). The Great Pyramid of Giza (c. 2580–2560 BC) uses corbel arches at the Grand Gallery. The Egyptians discovered the principle of the true arch early on, but continued to use the corbel arch in many buildings, sometimes mixing the two in the same building. In particular they avoided the true arch in temples as long as these were constructed, preferring rectangular openings with a straight lintel.

=== Ancient Mediterranean (Near East, Europe) ===
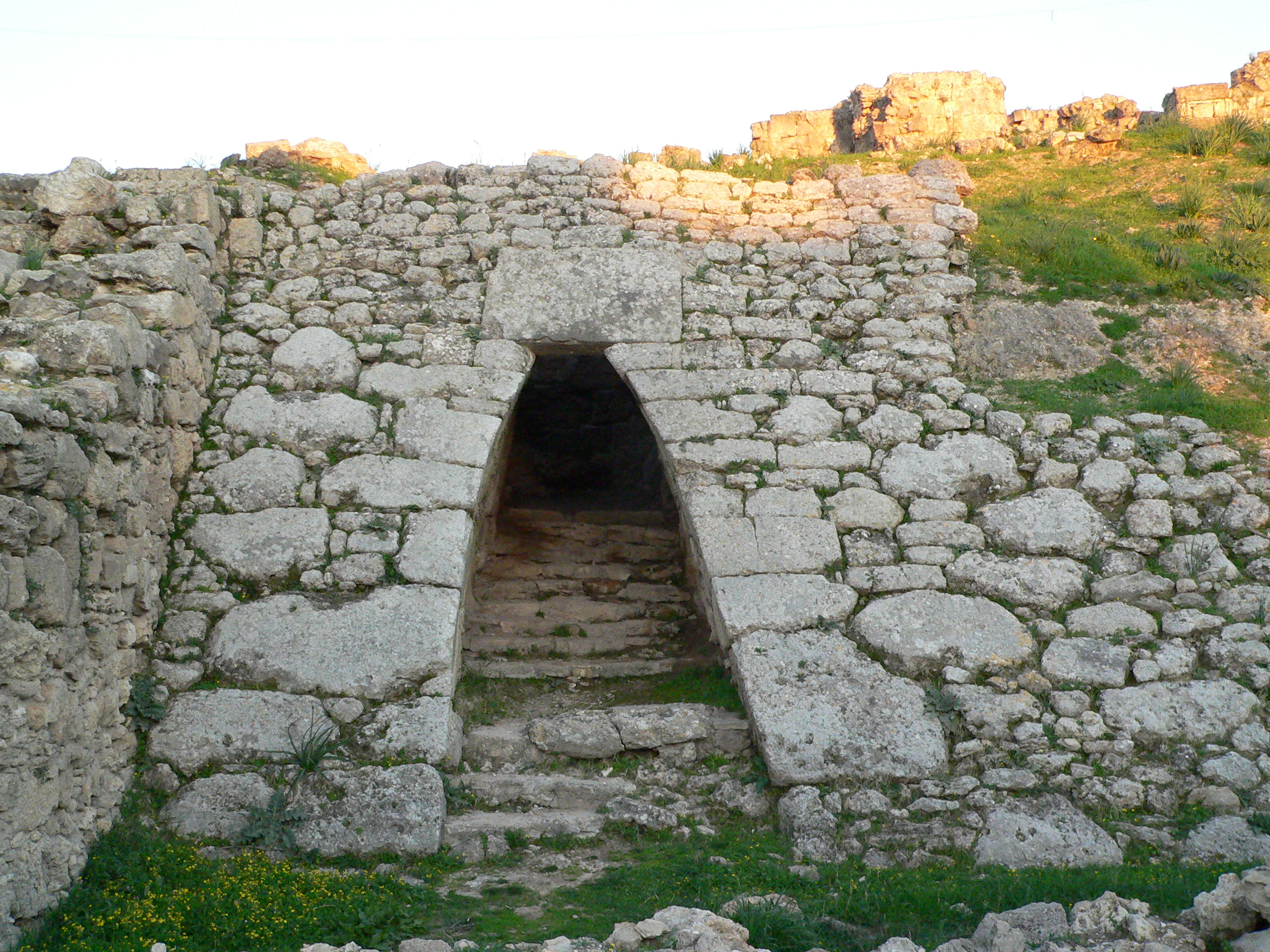
Entrance of the Bronze Age Royal Palace of Ugarit (in the ancient port city of Ugarit in northern Syria)

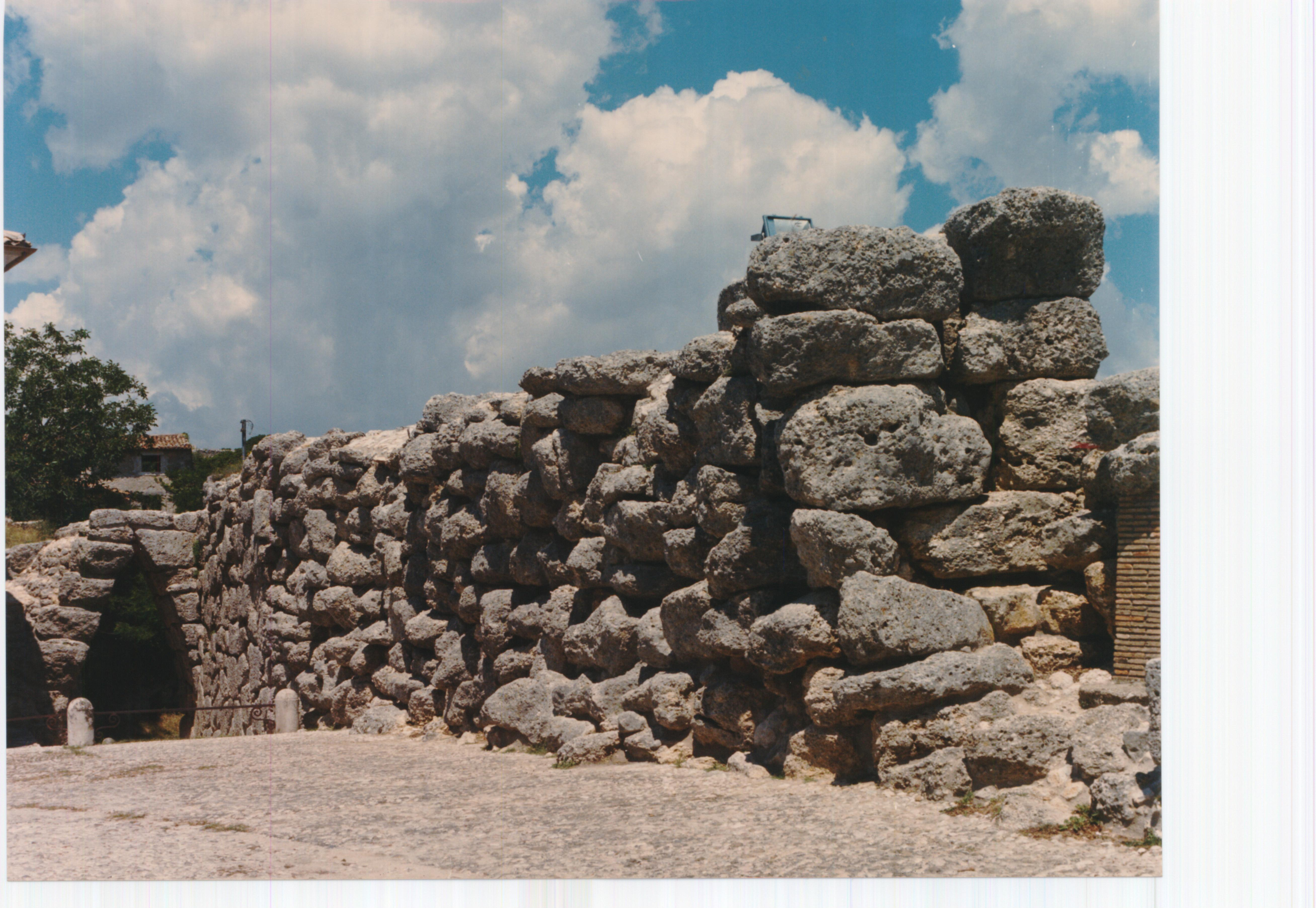
Corbel arch in Arpino's acropolis (Italy)

Corbel arches and vaults are found in various places around the ancient Mediterranean. In particular, corbelled burial vaults constructed below the floor are found in Middle Bronze II-III Ebla in Syria, and in Tell el-Ajjul, Hazor, Megiddo and Ta'anach in Canaan (today's Israel and Palestine). Ugarit, an ancient port city in northern Syria, also has corbelled structures.

Nuraghe constructions in ancient Sardinia, dating back to the 18th century BC, use similar corbel techniques. The use of beehive tombs on the Iberian Peninsula and elsewhere around the Mediterranean, going back to 3000 BC, is also similar.

==== Hittites (Anatolia) ====
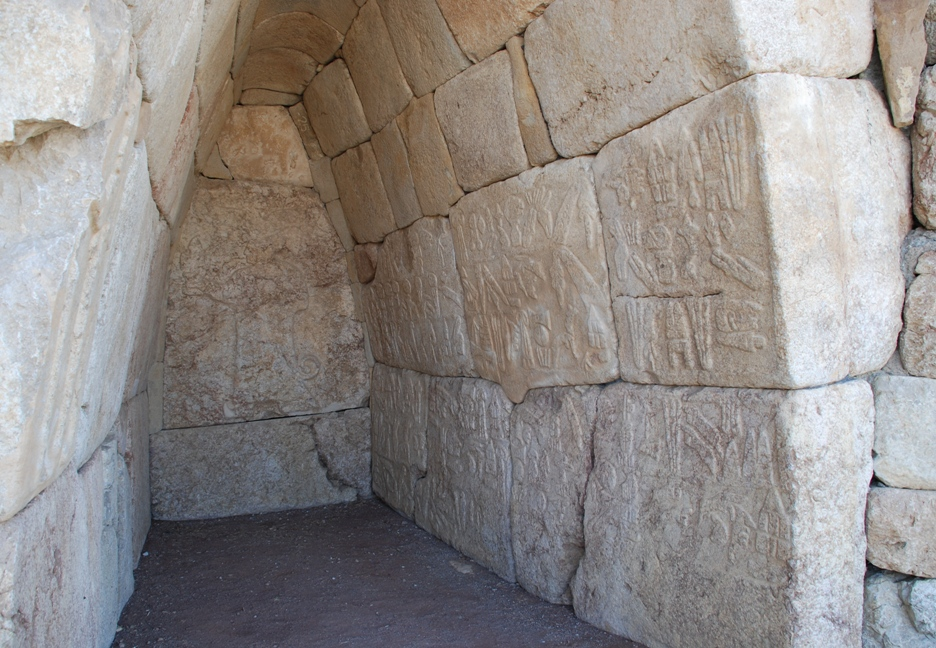
Corbelled chamber with hieroglyphs in Hattusa (Anatolia, Turkey), capital of the Hittite Empire in the late Bronze Age

The Hittites in ancient Anatolia were also building corbelled vaults. The earliest ones date to the 16th century BC.

Some similarities are found between the Hittite and Mycenaean construction techniques. Yet the Hittite corbelled vaults precede the Mycenaean ones by about 300 years. While using the corbelled technique, Hitties imitated the parabolic arches, likely due to being exposed to the Egyptian designs.

==== Greece (Mycenaean, Classical, Hellenistic) ====
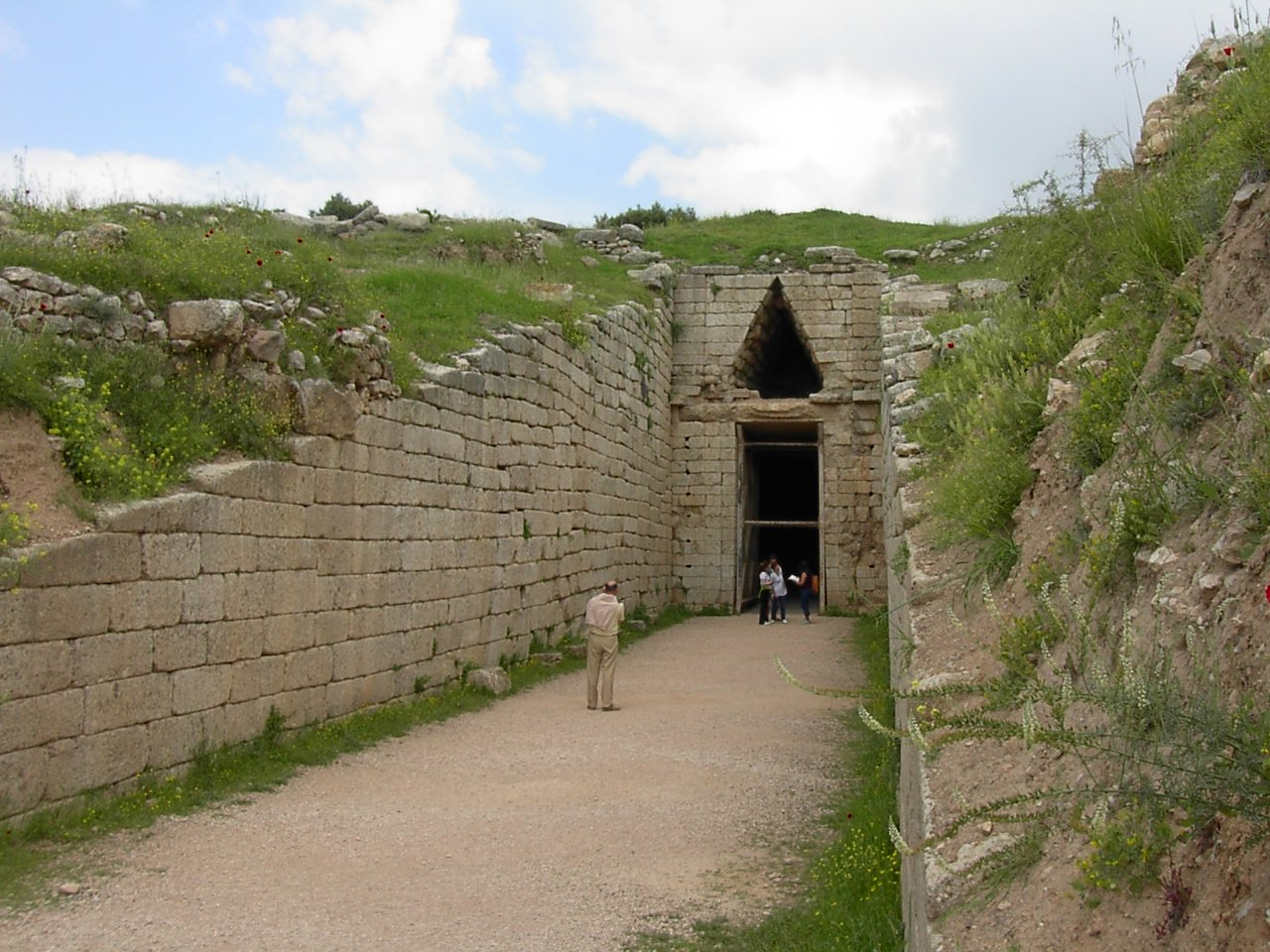
The Treasury of Atreus at Mycenae

Greece has a long list of surviving or archaeologically studied corbelled arches and vaults used for bridges and a multitude of other structures, dating from the Mycenean and Minoan, the late Classical, and the Hellenistic periods.

The ruins of ancient Mycenae feature many corbel arches and vaults, the Treasury of Atreus, built around 1250 BC, being a prominent example. The Arkadiko Bridge is one of four Mycenean corbel arch bridges, which are part of a former network of roads, designed to accommodate chariots, between Tiryns and Epidauros in the Peloponnese, in Greece. Dating to the Greek Bronze Age (13th century BC), it is one of the oldest arch bridges still in existence and use.

The well-preserved Hellenistic Eleutherna Bridge on Crete has an unusually large span of nearly 4 metres. A second nearby bridge, which had survived until the late 19th century, is tentatively dated to the late Classical period.

=== Maya civilization ===
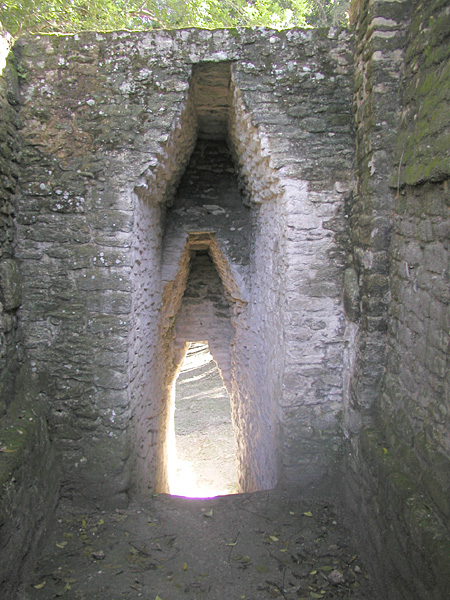
Maya corbel arch at Cahal Pech

Corbeled triangular arches are a distinctive feature of certain pre-Columbian Mesoamerican constructions and historical/regional architectural styles, particularly in that of the Maya civilization. The prevalence of this spanning technique for entrances and vaults in Maya architecture is attested at a great many Maya archaeological sites, and is known from structures dating back to the Formative or Preclassic era. By the beginning of the Classic era (ca. 250 CE) corbeled vaults are a near-universal feature of building construction in the central Petén Basin region of the central Maya lowlands.

=== India ===
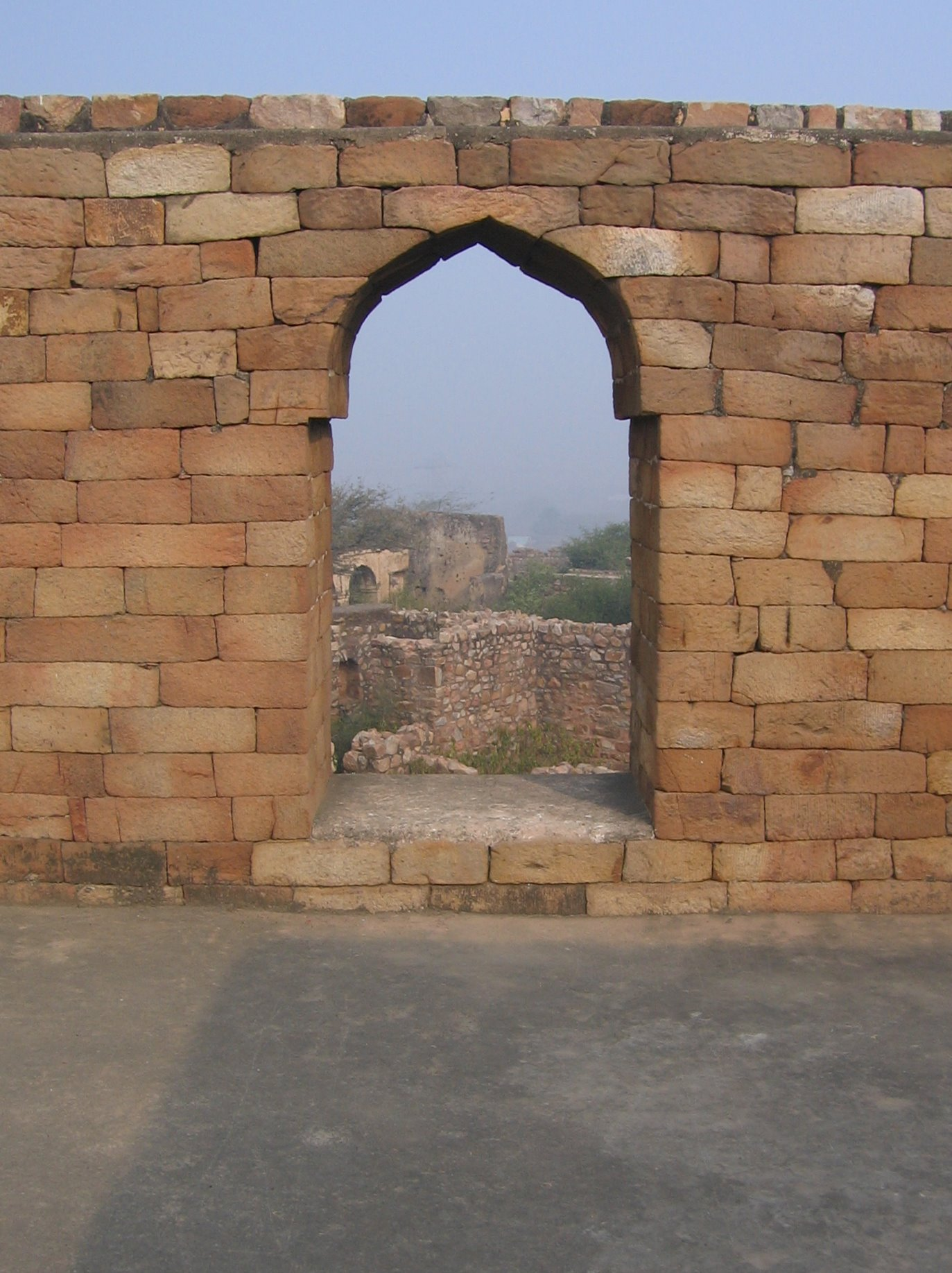
A corbelled arch at the tomb of Nasir ud din Mahmud, Ghori, New Delhi

Before the true arch was introduced in Indo-Islamic architecture, almost all the arches in Indian buildings were either trabeated or corbelled. In North India in the state of Orissa, "the later temples at Bhubaneswar were built on the principle of corbelled vaulting, which is seen first in the porch of the Mukteshvara [a temple said to epitomize North Indian architecture, circa AD 950] and, technically speaking, no fundamental change occurred from this time onwards."

The earliest large buildings of the Delhi Sultanate established in 1206 after a Muslim invasion used Indian workers used to Hindu temple architecture, but the patrons were used to Central Asian styles that used true arches heavily. Corbel arches, the largest of exceptional size, were used in the massive screens in front of the Quwwat-ul-Islam Mosque in Delhi, begun in 1193, and the Adhai Din Ka Jhonpra mosque, Ajmer, Rajasthan, c. 1229. These are examples of Islamic architecture drawing on Persia and Central Asia, where builders were well used to the true arch, that stick with the corbelled arch that Indian builders were used to.

It took almost a century from the start of the Delhi Sultanate in 1206 for the true arch to appear. By around 1300 true domes and arches with voussoirs were being built; the ruined Tomb of Balban (d. 1287) in the Qutb complex in Delhi may be the earliest survival.

=== Indonesia ===
The candi or temples of Indonesia which were constructed between 8th to 15th century, made use of corbel arch technique to create a span opening for gate or inner chamber of the temple. The notable example of corbel arch in Indonesian classic temple architecture are the arches of Borobudur. The interlocking andesite stone blocks creating the corbel arch, are notable for their "T" formed lock on the center top of the corbel arch.

=== Cambodia ===
All the temples in Angkor made use of the corbel arch, between the AD 9th and 12th centuries.

== Gallery ==
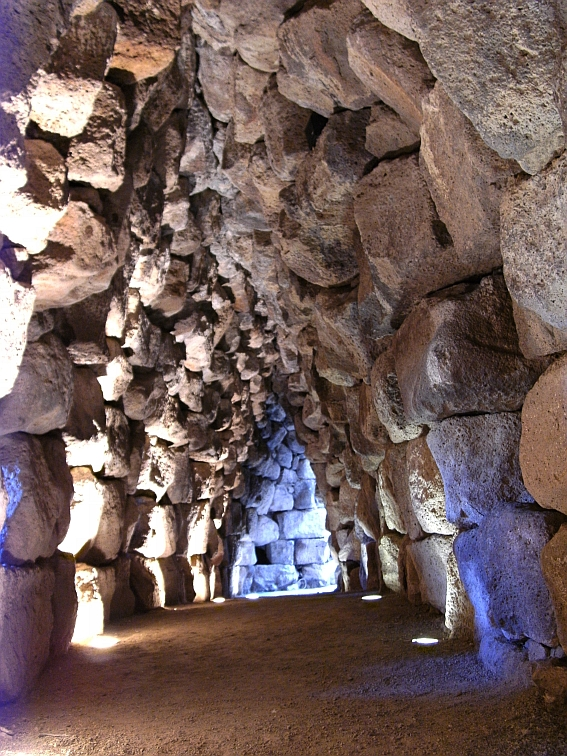
Corbelled archway at Nuraghe Santu Antine, Sardinia, 19-18th centuries BC

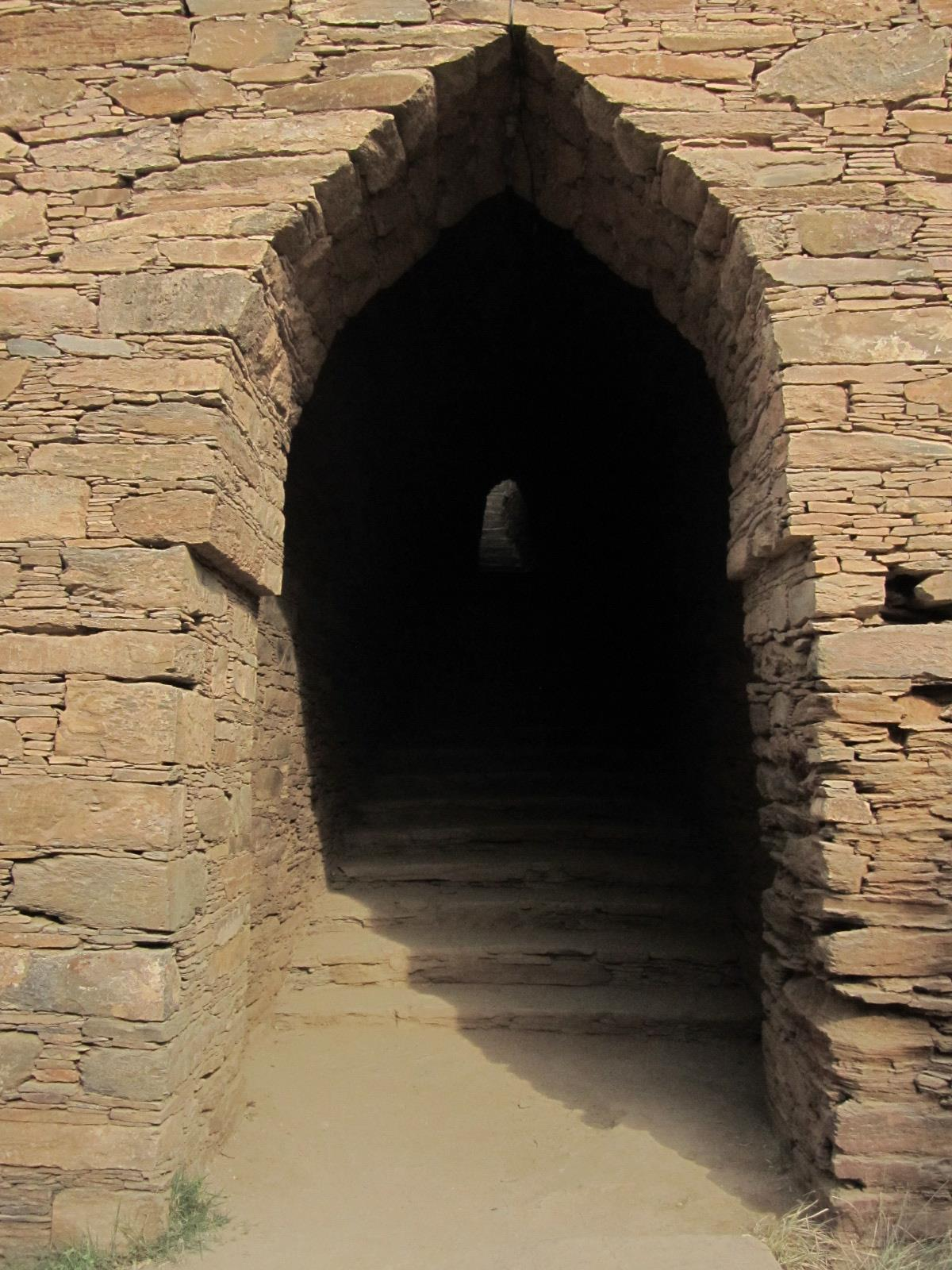
Corbelled arch doorway of Indo-Parthian Buddhist monastery at Takht-i-Bahi, Pakistan, c. 3rd century AD

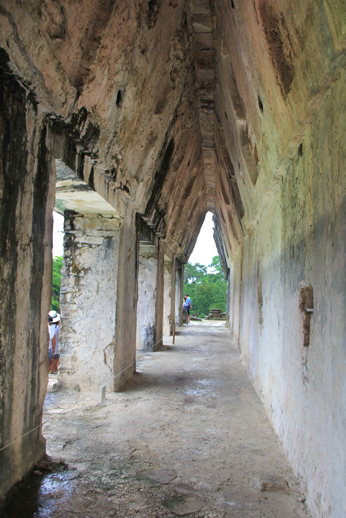
Corbelled arch hallway in the Palace at Palenque (5th-8th c. Maya city), Mexico

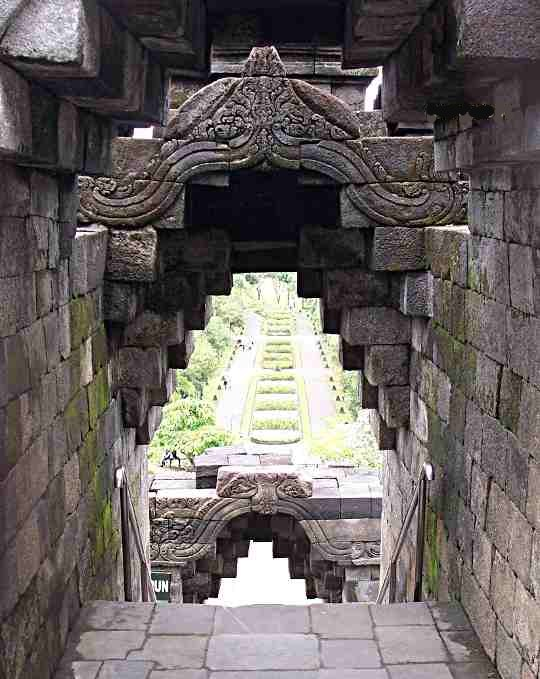
Stone corbelled arches at Borobudur (9th century AD) in Java, Indonesia. Note the T-shaped central stones.

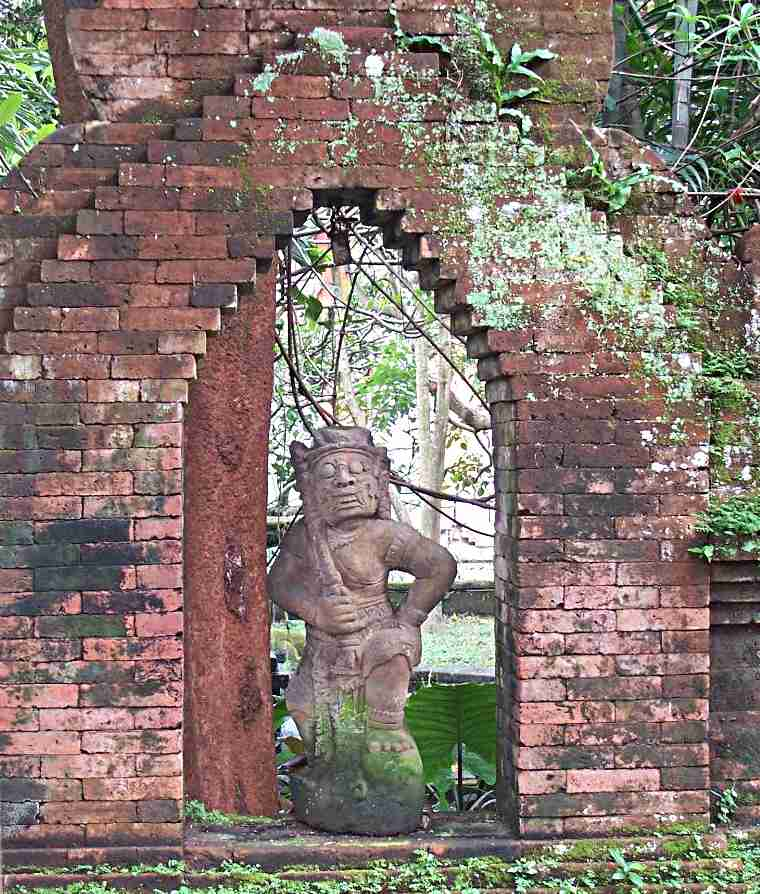
Brickwork corbelled arch at Ubud in Bali, Indonesia

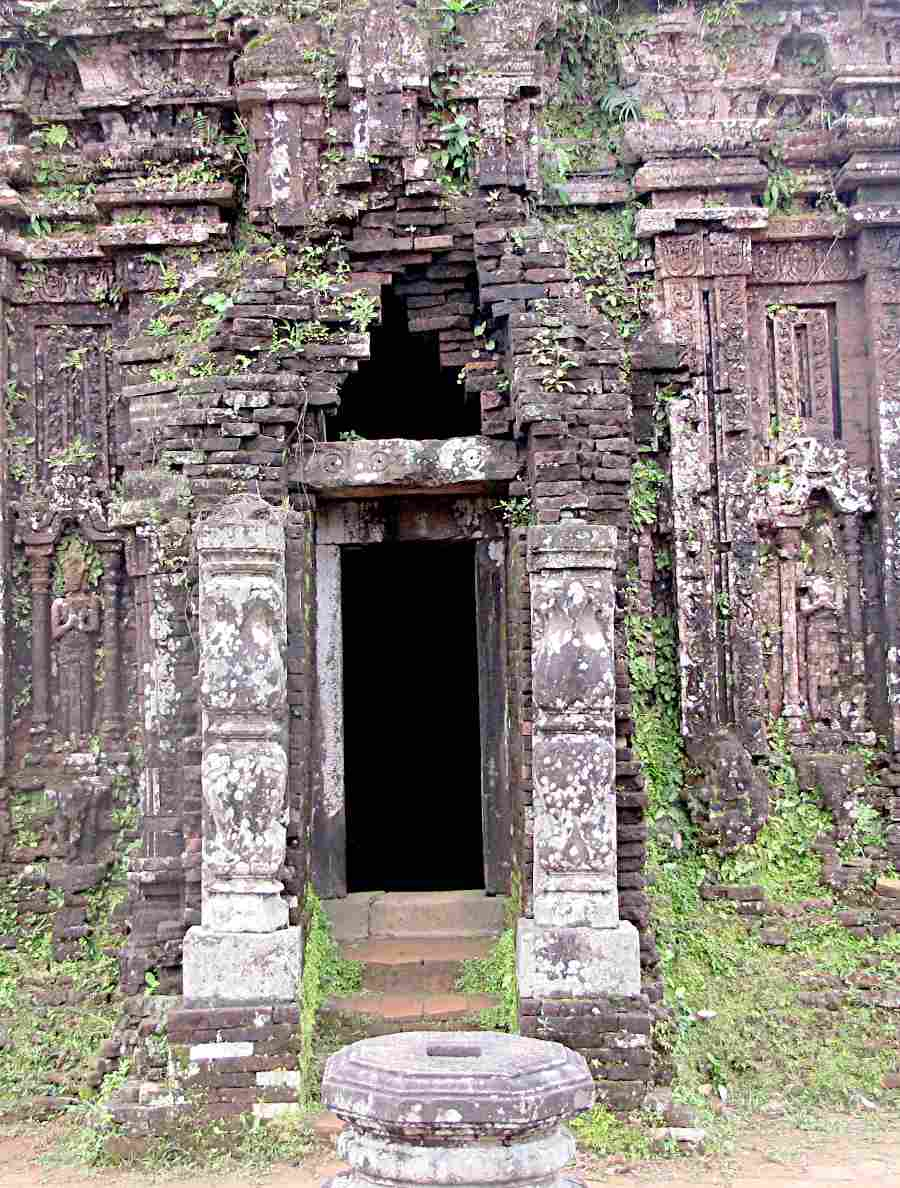
A brick corbelled arch disintegrating slowly at Mỹ Sơn (4th-14th c. Hindu temples) in Vietnam

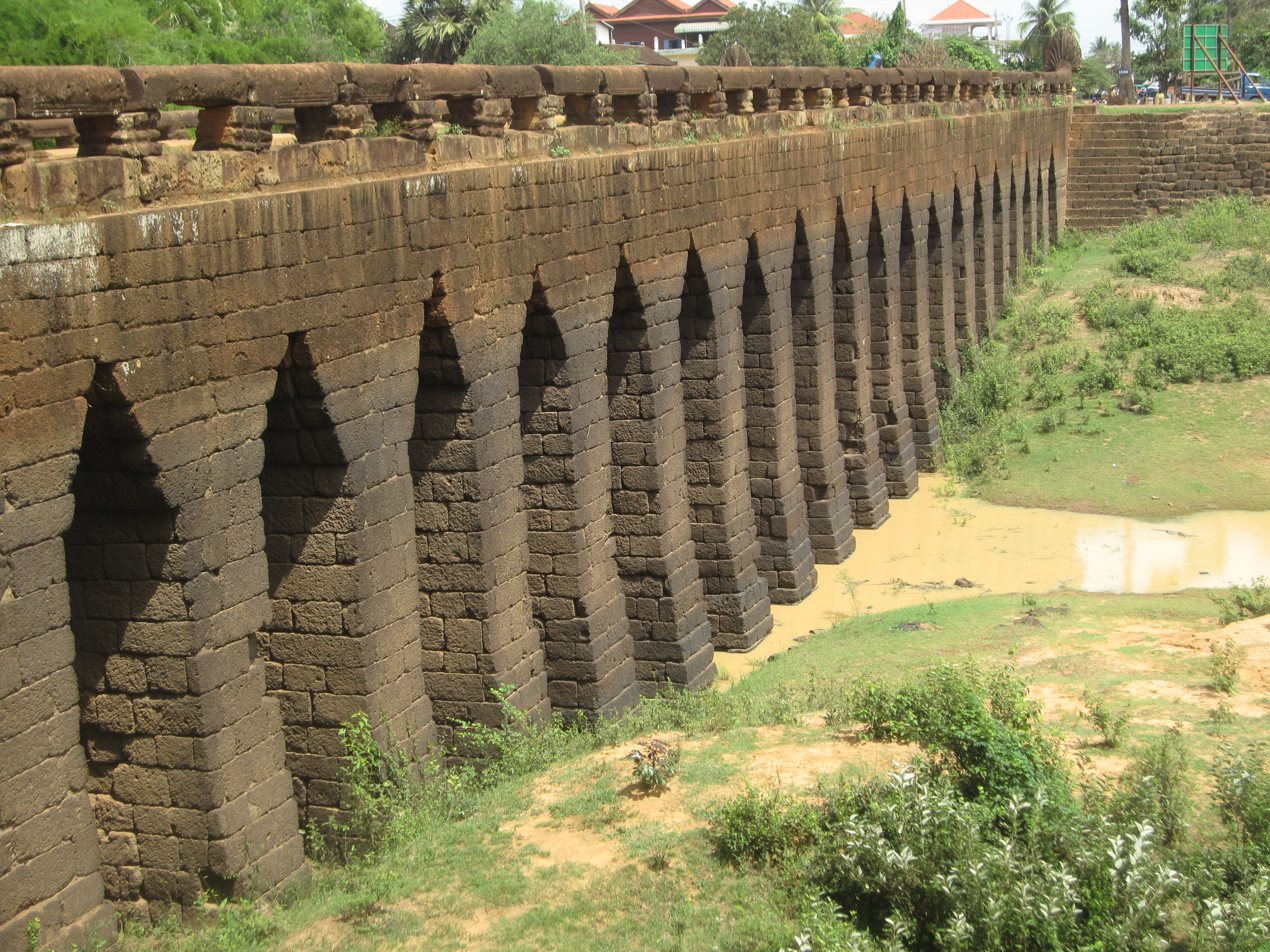
The corbelled arch span of Spean Praptos, 12th-century Cambodia

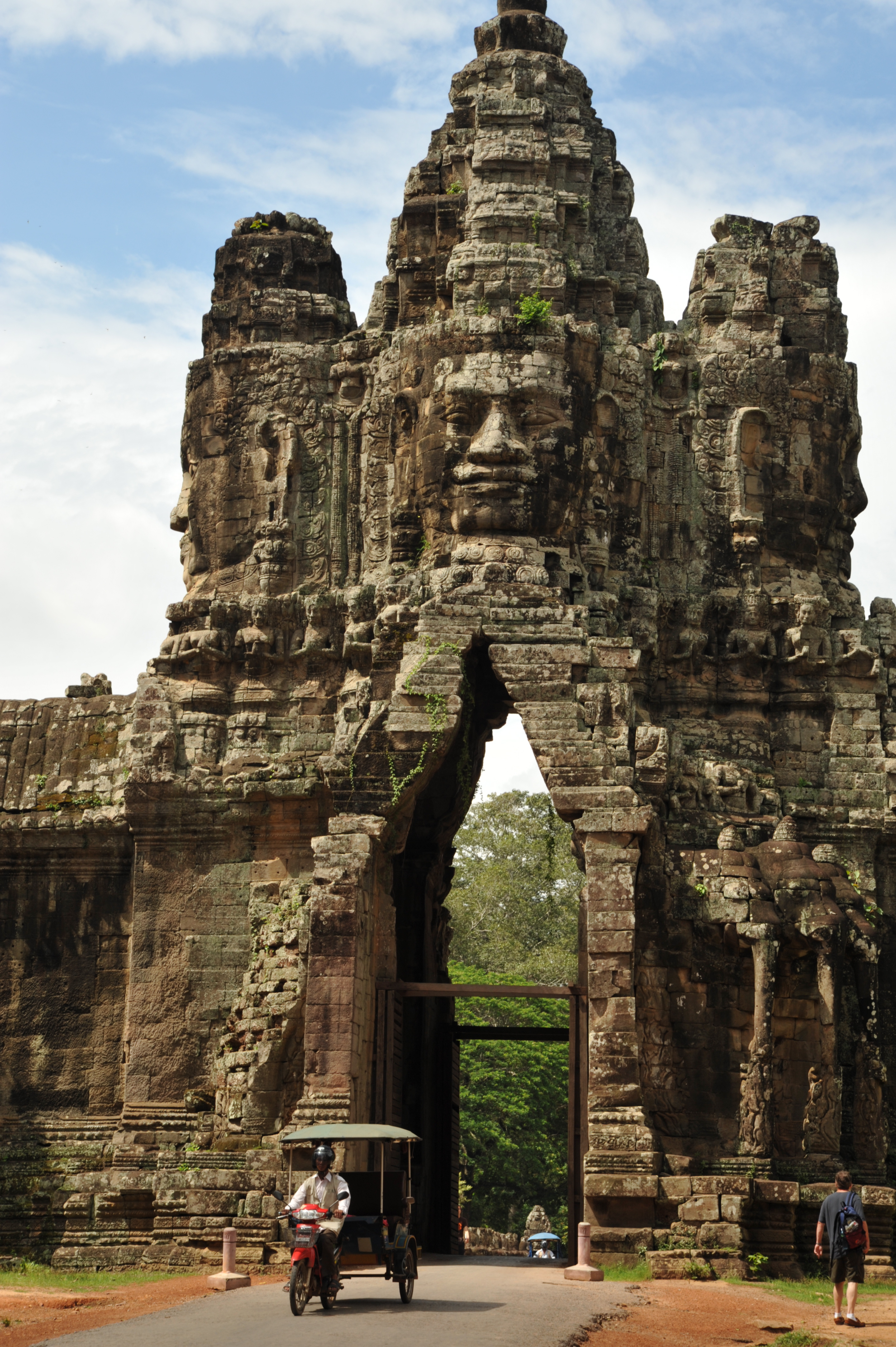
Stone corbelled gateway arch to walls of Angkor Thom (12th-17th c. city) in Cambodia

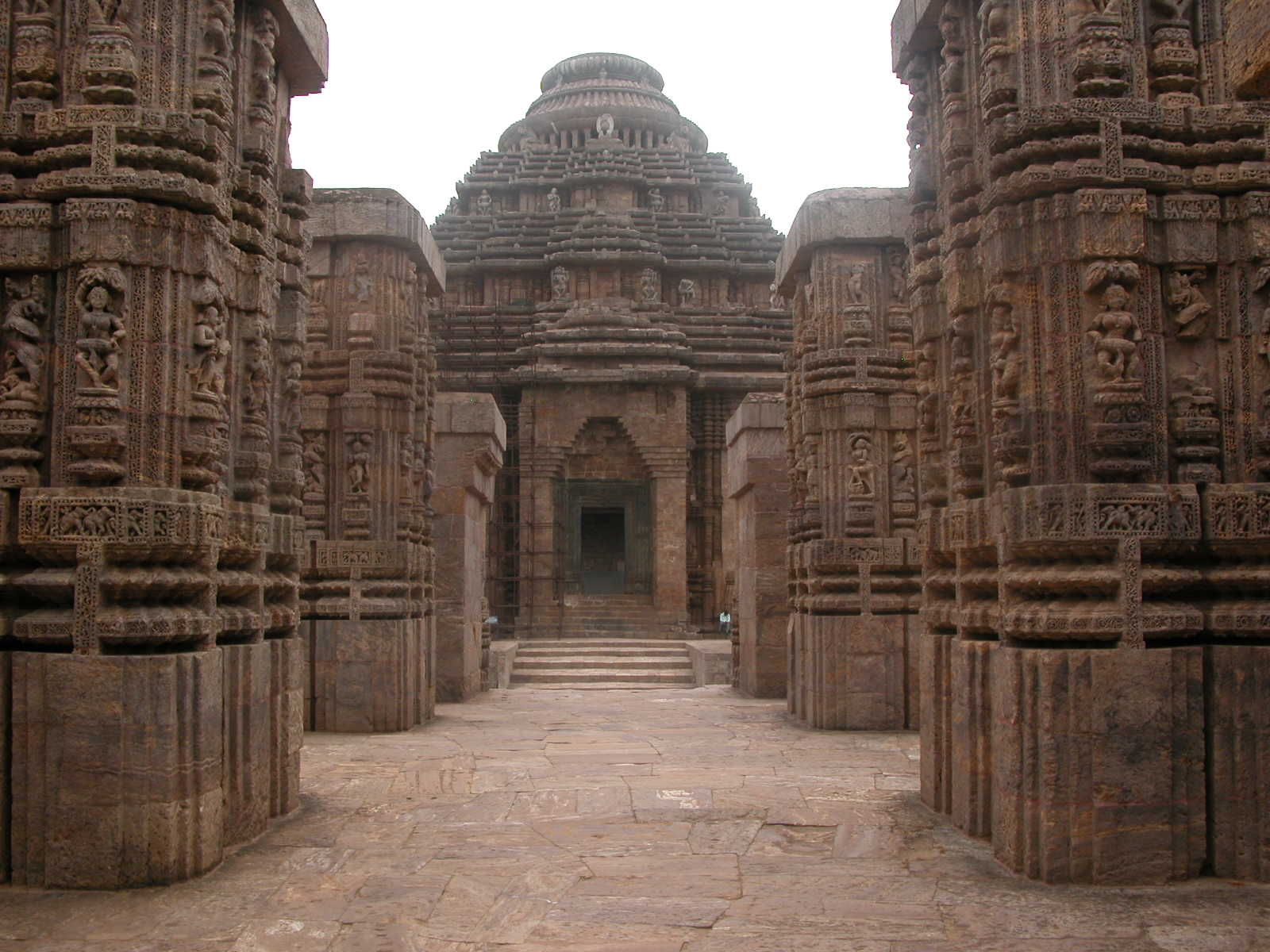
Stone corbelled arch in the 13th-century Konark temple, India

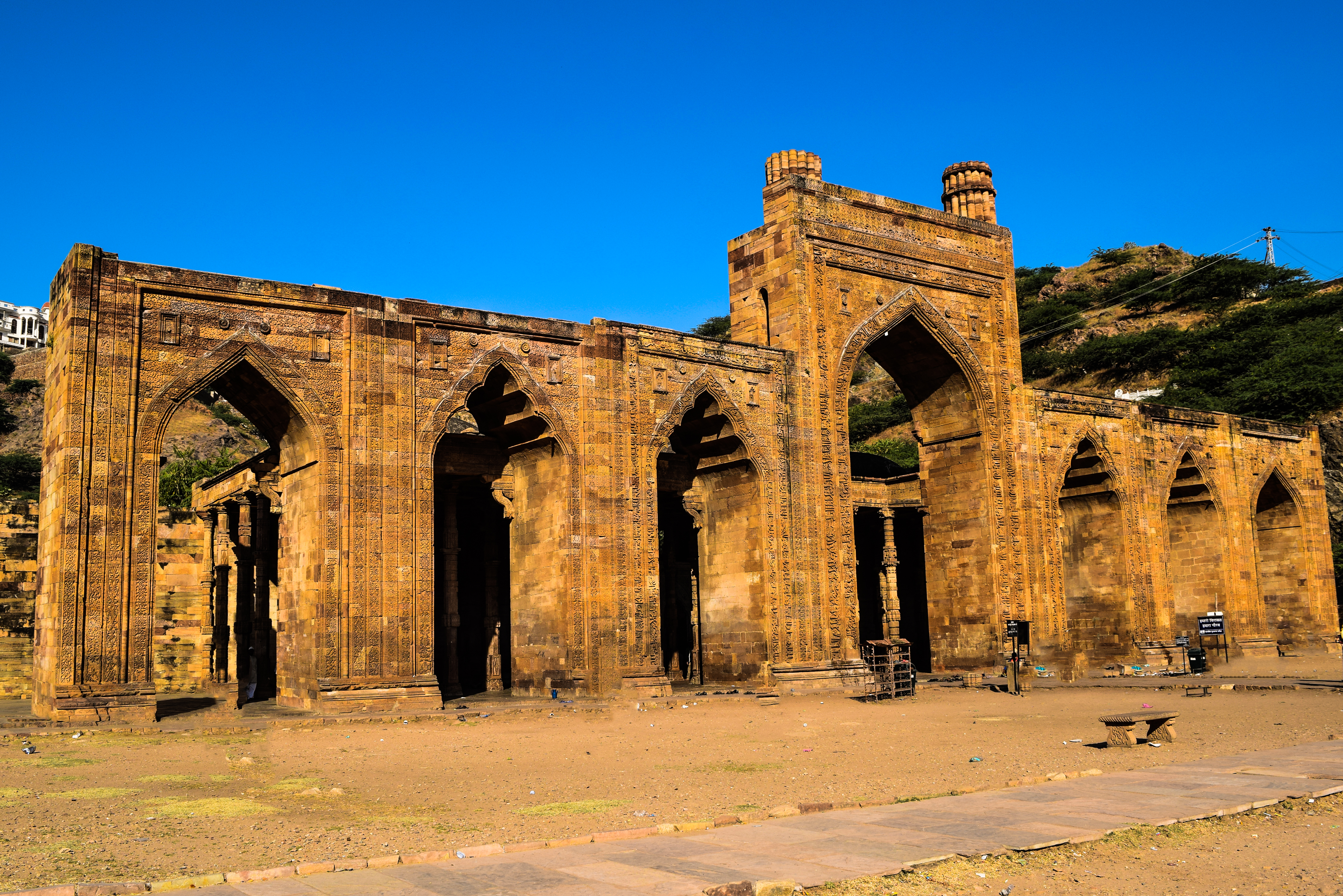
Corbelled arch screen of the Adhai Din Ka Jhonpra mosque (c. 1229), Ajmer, India; Corbel arches, some cusped.

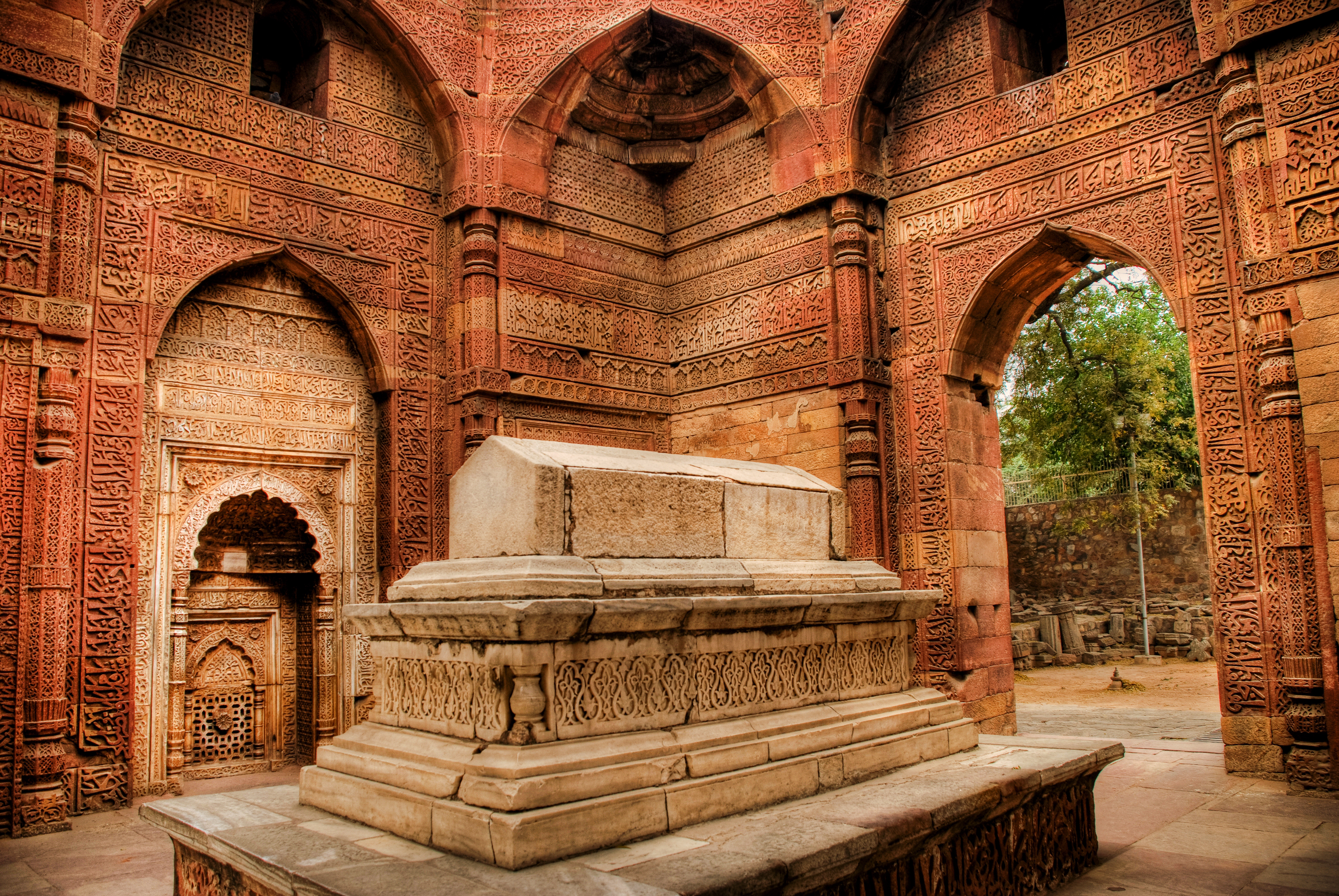
Multiple styles of corbelled arch in the Mausoleum of Iltutmish, Delhi, by 1236, early Indo-Islamic architecture

== See also ==
- Catenary arch
- Parabolic arch

== Sources ==
- Coe, Michael D. (1987). The Maya (4th edition (revised) ed.). London: Thames & Hudson. ISBN 0-500-27455-X.
- Harle, J.C., The Art and Architecture of the Indian Subcontinent, 2nd edn. 1994, Yale University Press Pelican History of Art, ISBN 0300062176
- Woodman, Francis; Bloom, Jonathan M. (2003). "Arch". Oxford Art Online. Oxford University Press. doi:10.1093/gao/9781884446054.article.t003657. ISBN 978-1-884446-05-4.
