= Spean Thma =

Bridge in Cambodia

Coordinates: 13°26′41″N 103°52′39″E

Spean Thma (Khmer: ស្ពានថ្ម, Spéan Thmâ; lit. "stone bridge") in Angkor, Cambodia is known as the bridge of stone and it is located west of Ta Keo. It is one of the few Khmer Empire era bridges to have survived to the modern day.

It was built on the former path of the Siem Reap River between Angkor Thom and the Eastern Baray and it was probably rebuilt after the Khmer period (around the 15th century), as it includes many reused sandstone blocks.

The 14 narrow arches are 1.10 m wide.

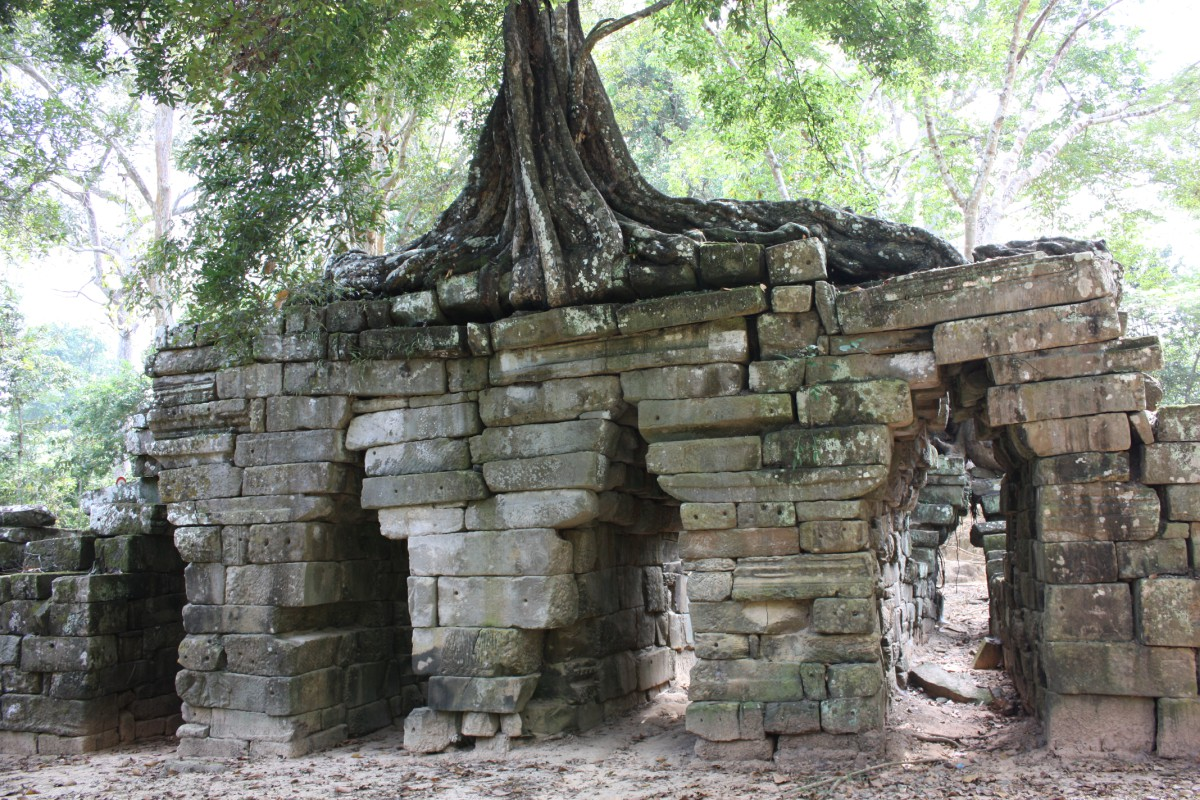
Spean Thma bridge, showing the use of corbelling.

Several other bridges on the same model are visible: in the Angkor site (Spean Memai) and at several locations of the former empire. On the road from Angkor to Beng Mealea, the Spean Praptos is one of the longest with 25 arches.

== Bibliography ==
- Rooney, Dawn F. (2005). Angkor: Cambodia's wondrous khmer temples (5th ed.). Odissey. ISBN 978-962-217-727-7.
