= Chi Kraeng District =

Chi Kraeng ជីក្រែង
- District (srok)
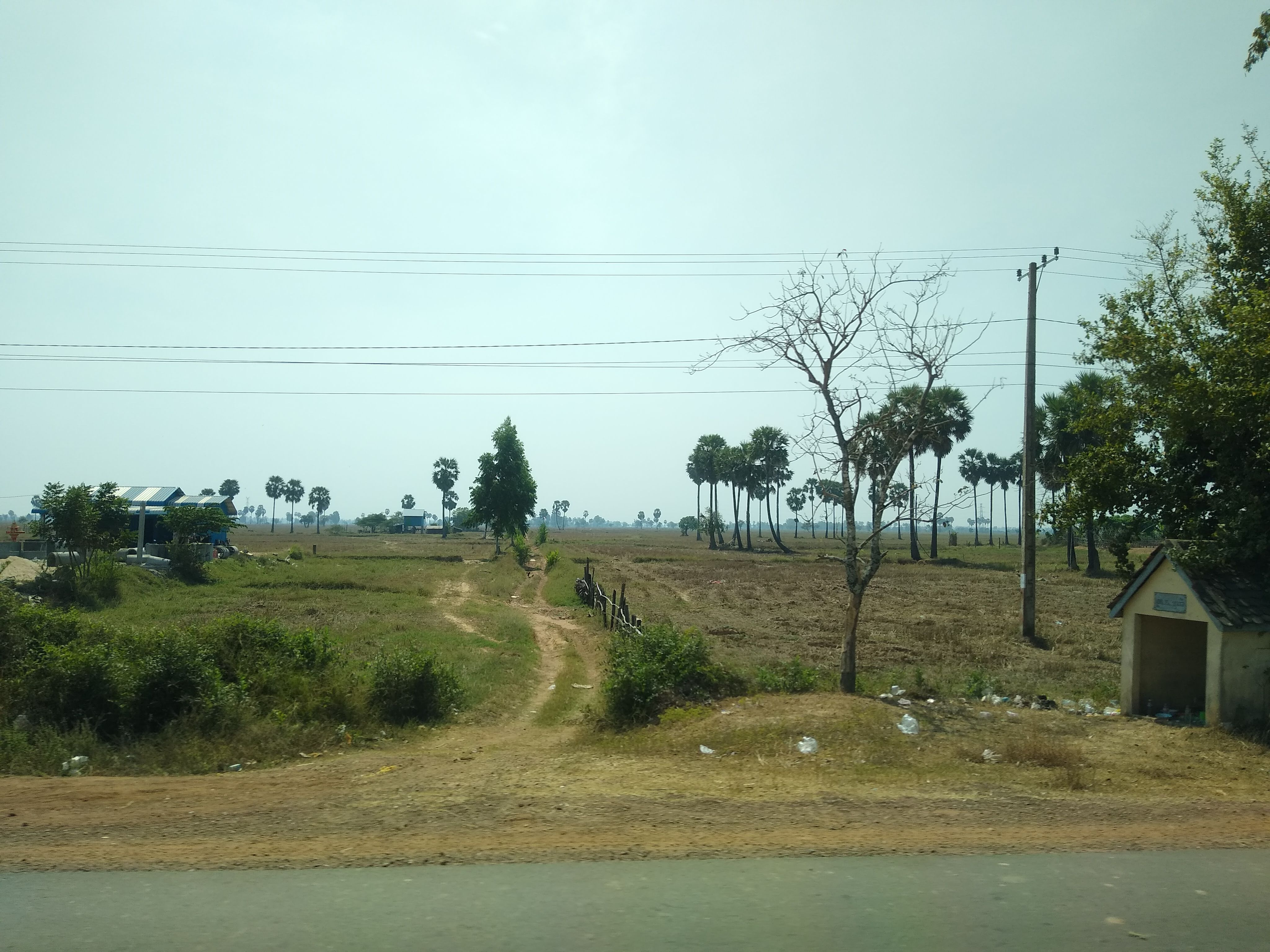

- District location in Siem Reap Province
- Coordinates: 13°12′27.76″N 104°22′17.54″E
- Country: Cambodia
- Province: Siem Reap
- Time zone: +7
- Geocode: 1704

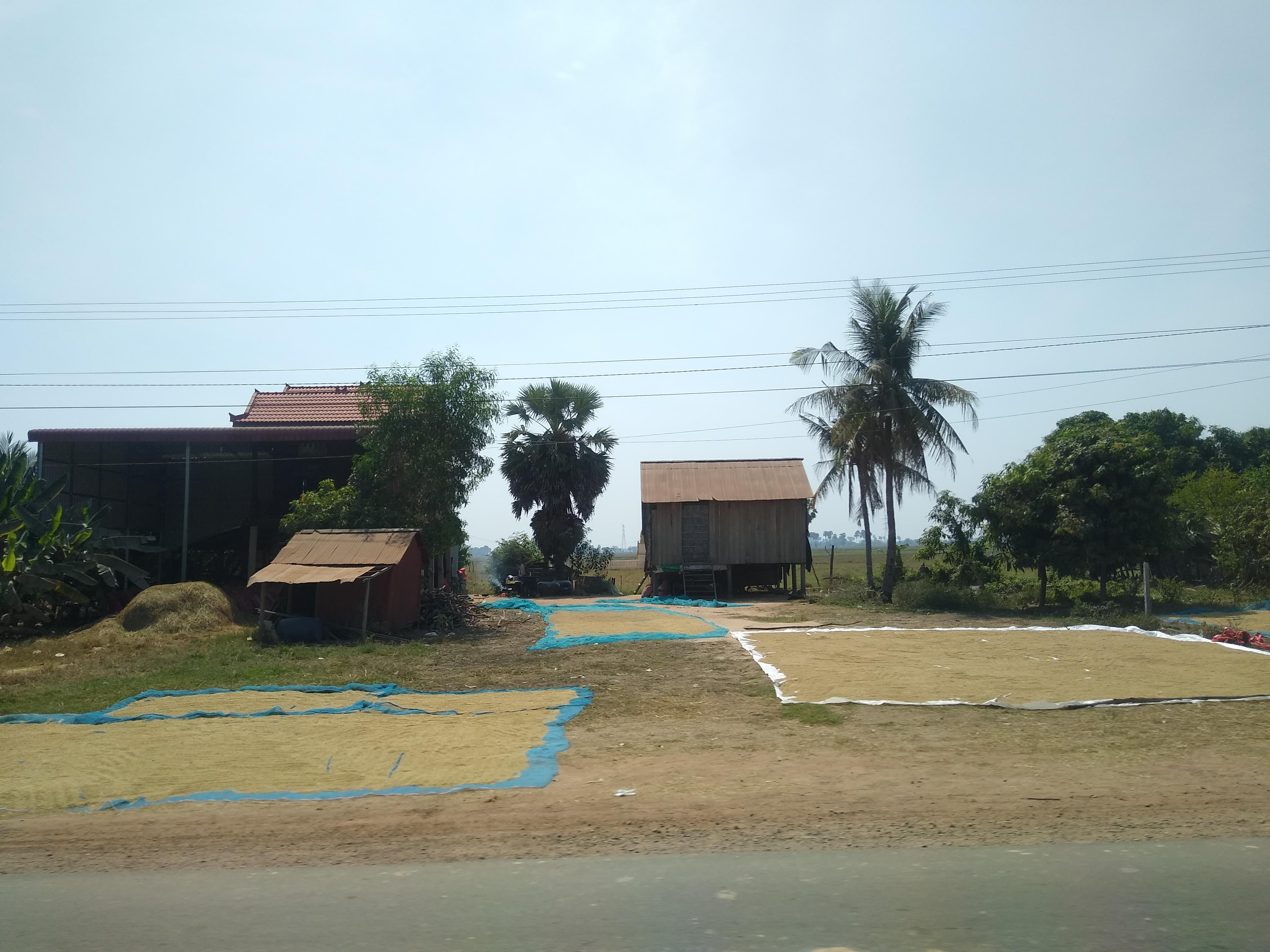

Chi Kraeng District is a district located in Siem Reap Province, in north-west Cambodia. According to the 1998 census of Cambodia, it had a population of 106,727.

== Administrative divisions ==
Code Commune	Commune	Language Khmer	Village
១៧០៤០១	Anlong Samnar	ឃុំអន្លង់សំណរ (Anlong Samnar)	ស្តៅ(Sdau), អន្លង់ព្រីងក្រោម(Anlong Pring Kraom), អន្លង់ព្រីងលើ(Anlong Pring Leu), តាគឹមក្រោម(Ta Kuem Kraom), តាគឹមលើ(Ta Kuem Leu), ត្រពាំងត្រស់(Trapeang Tras), អន្លង់សំណរ(Anlong Samnar), អន្លង់ប្ញស្សី(Anlong Ruessei), ស្វាយតាដោក(Svay Ta Daok), សំរោងធំ(Samraong Thum), ចែកខ្សាច់លើ(Chaek Khsach Leu), ចែកខ្សាច់ក្រោម(Chaek Khsach Kraom), ល្បើក(Lbaeuk), ព្រែកអង្ករថ្មី(Preaek Angkor Thmei), ស្ទឹងជ្រៅ(Steung Chrov), មាត់ខ្លា(Moat Kla)
១៧០៤០២	Chi Kraeng	ឃុំជីក្រែង	កំពង់ស្នោលិច(Kampong Snao Lech), សណ្តាន់(Sandan), ជីក្រែង(Chi Kraeng), ព្រីង(Pring), ស្រម៉(Sramar), កំពង់(Kampong), អន្លង់ត្នោត(Anlong Tnaot), អន្លង់ចំបក់(Anlong Chambak), បេង(Beng), គរ(Kor), តារៀម(Ta Ream), ភ្នៀត(Phniet), បុស្សពក(Bos Pok), កំពង់ស្នោកើត(Kampong Snao Kaeut)
១៧០៤០៣	Kampong Kdei	ឃុំកំពង់ក្តី	រកា(Roka), សាលា(Sala), សែ្លង(Slaeng), ចំបក់ធំ(Chambak Thum), ច្រាំងខ្ពស់(Chrang Khpos), អន្សងពង(Ansang Pong), ត្រាចថ្មី(Trach Thmei), ប្រាសាទ(Prasat), រំលង(Rumloung), កំពង់ក្តី១(Kampong Kdei Muoy), កំពង់ក្តី២(Kampong Kdei Pir), ពោធិ៏សេរី(Pou Serei), ពន្លឺព្រះផុស(Ponlueu Preah Phos), សងែ្កមានជ័យ(Sangkae Mean Chey), តាពាម(Ta Piem), ត្រពាំងជ្រៃ(Trapeang Chrey)
១៧០៤០៤	Khvav	ឃុំខ្វាវ	អូរ(Ou), ខ្វាវ(Khvav), ព្រះធាតុ(Preah Theat), ស្រោង(Sraong), ក្រាំង(Krang), ពោធិ៍រីង(Pou Ring), រវៀង(Rovieng), ចុងស្ពាន(Chong Spean), កំបោអ(Kambor Or), ជ្រៃ(Chrey)
១៧០៤០៥	Kouk Thlok Kraom	ឃុំគោកធ្លកក្រោម	ថ្មី(Thmei), ក្របីរៀល(Krabei Riel), ប៉ាតត(Patat), កកោះ(Kakaoh), អន្លង់វិល(Anlong Vil), កំពង់ម្កាក់(Kampong Mkak), ត្រពាំងត្រាវ(Trapeang Trav), ដូនរាជ្(Doun Reach)យ, តាទរ(Ta Tor), ថ្នល់តាសិត(Thnal Ta Set), ដូនសុខ(Doun Sokh), គីឡូតាឈឹម(Kilou Ta Chhuem), បេង(Beng), បាក់អង្រុត(Bak Angrut), បុស្សគរ( Bos Kor), គោករមាស(Kouk Romeas), បឹងធំ(Boeng Thum), ទ័ពសៀម(Toap Siem)
១៧០៤០៦	Kouk Thlok Leu	ឃុំគោកធ្លកលើ	ខ្លាឃ្មុំ, សាលា, ត្រពាំងវែង, សងែ្ក, គោកធ្លក, ព្រៃធំ, ថ្លុកស្មាច់, សែ្លងកោង, ស្វាយពក, តាភ្ញា, ថ្នល់, តាលៀន, ម្កាក់
១៧០៤០៧	Lveaeng Ruessei	ឃុំល្វែងឫស្សី	តាអុង, គោកអំពិល, រំជ័យច្រុះ, ថ្នល់, ក្នុង, ព្រៃទទឹង, ក្បាលក្តួច, បល្ល័ង្ក, ចំបក់ខ្ពស់, រូងថ្មី, លែ្វងប្ញស្សី, តាងួន, កកោះ
១៧០៤០៨	Pongro Kraom	ឃុំពង្រក្រោម	ពពេល, ពង្រ១, ពង្រ២, ថ្មី, សំបូរ, អូររូង, ពោធិ៏, ជ័យបូរ, ផ្លុង, តាព័រ1, តាព័រ២, អូរខ្លុង, ដងផ្អាវ
១៧០៤០៩	Pongro Leu	ឃុំពង្រលើ	ត្រពាំងភ្លោះ, ចេក, គ្រាំង, ក្បាលដំរី, គំរូ, ស្វាយចេក, ដុបត្នោត, ស្រឡៅស្រោង, ព្រៃឆ្ការ
១៧០៤១០	Ruessei Lok	ឃុំឫស្សីលក	សំរោងកញ្ជោច, បឹង, ស្ពានតូច, យាង, ប្ញស្សីលក, ទទឹងថៃ្ង, ក្រូច, ត្រពាំងរុន
១៧០៤១១	Sangvaeuy	ឃុំសង្វើយ	ពាក់ស្ពា, អូរ, ចក, តាព្រហ្ម, ថ្នល់ដាច់, ដំរីឆ្លង, កនែ្សង, ព្រៃប្រស់
១៧០៤១២	Spean Tnaot	ឃុំស្ពានត្នោត	ស្ពានត្នោត១, ស្ពានត្នោត២, ចំរេះ, ថ្នល់កែង, ថ្នល់លោក, ក្ងានពង, រំដេង, ត្រពាំងវែង, តាយ៉ុន, ទទា, ល្វា, សំរោង, អូរត្រាច, អូរក្រោម, អូរលើ
