= Spean Praptos =

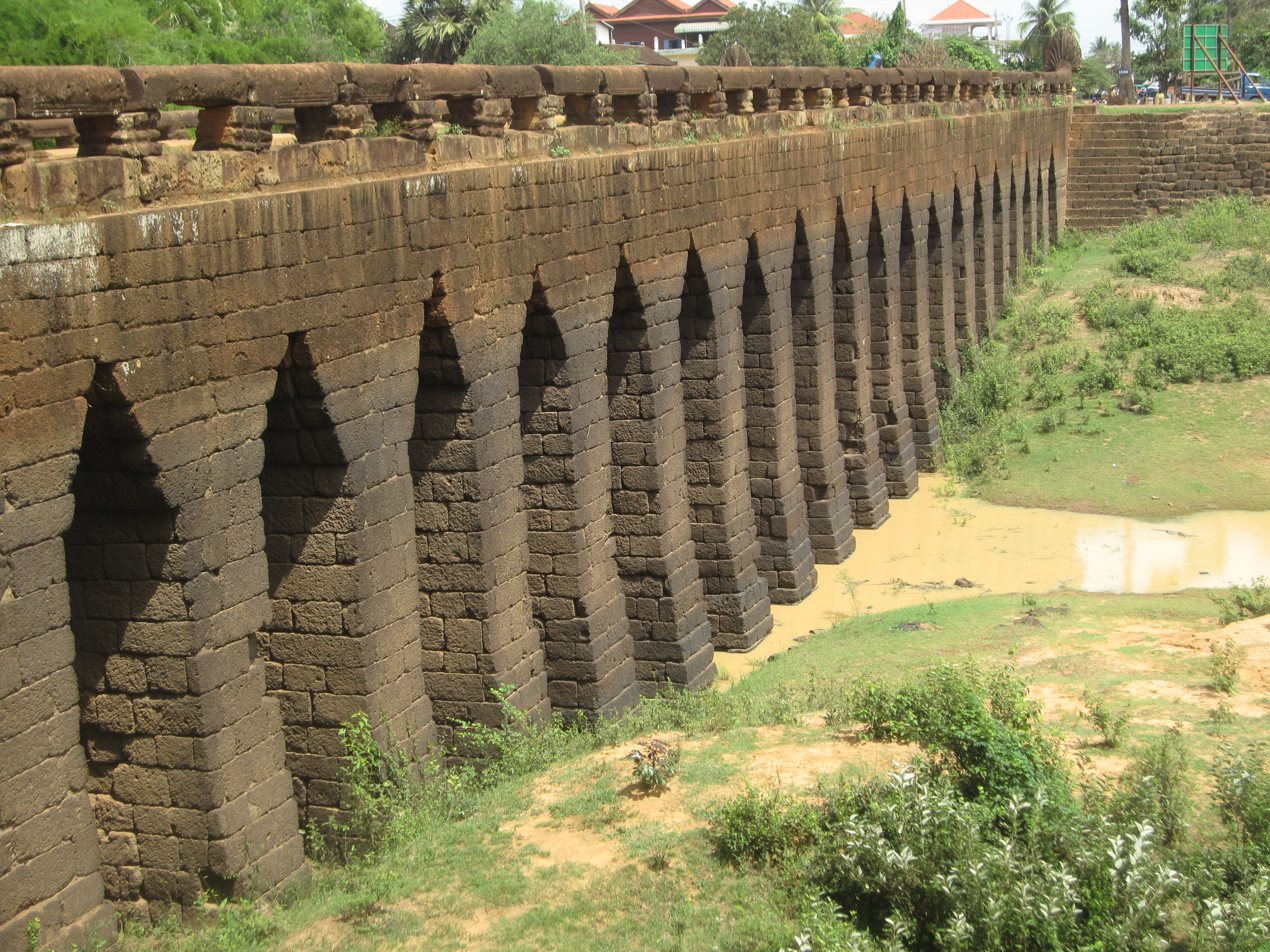
- The bridge's corbel arches
- Coordinates: 13°07′36″N 104°20′20″E
- Carries: Road traffic
- Crosses: Chickreng River
- Locale: Siem Reap Province, Cambodia

Characteristics
- Design: Corbel arch
- Material: Stone

History
- Construction start: 12th century

Location
- Interactive map of Spean Praptos

Spean Praptos (Khmer: ស្ពានប្រាប់ទិស, also known as Kampong Kdei Bridge ស្ពានកំពង់ក្ដី) on the road from Angkor to Phnom Penh, Cambodia, used to be the longest corbeled stone-arch bridge in the world, with more than twenty narrow arches spanning 285 ft (87m). The bridge was built in the 12th century during the reign of King Jayavarman VII. It is one of the few Khmer Empire era bridges to have survived to the modern day.

Several other bridges on the same model are visible: in the Angkor site (Spean Memai), Spean Thma on the former path of the Siem Reap River between Angkor Thom and the Eastern Baray, and at several locations of the former empire.

== Gallery ==
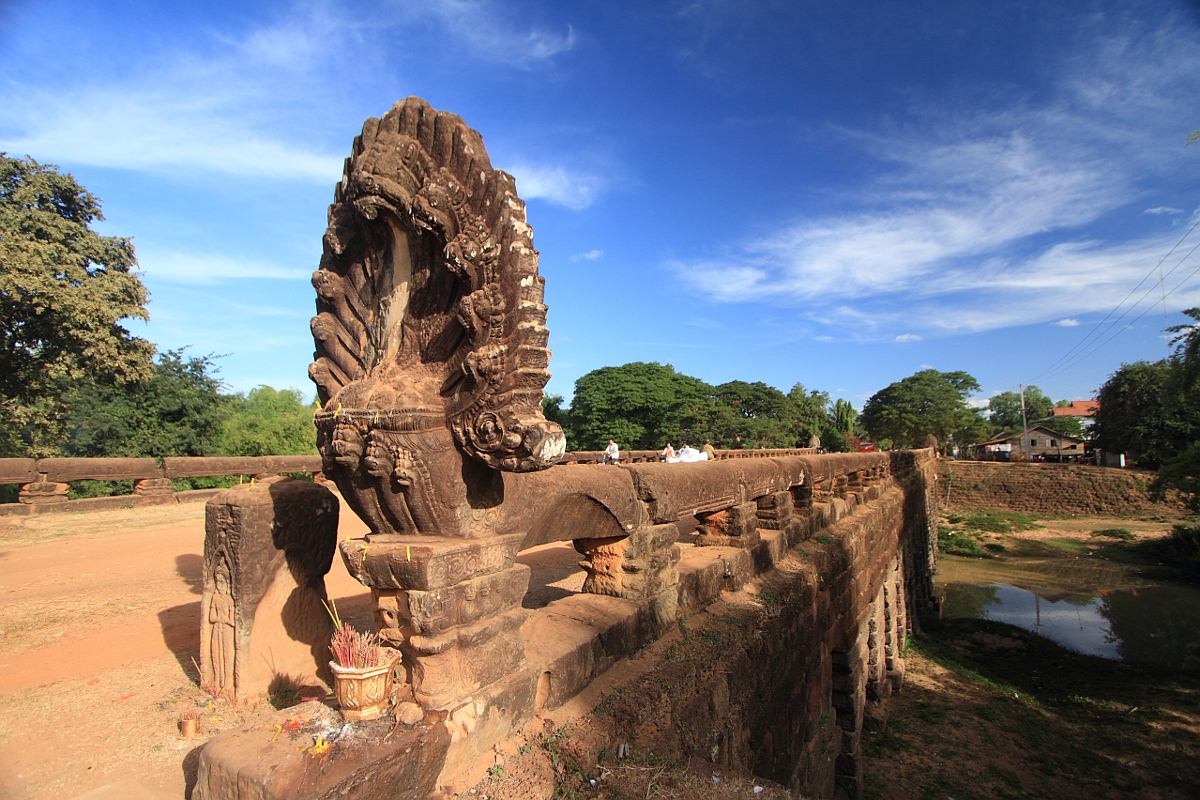
Spean Praptos

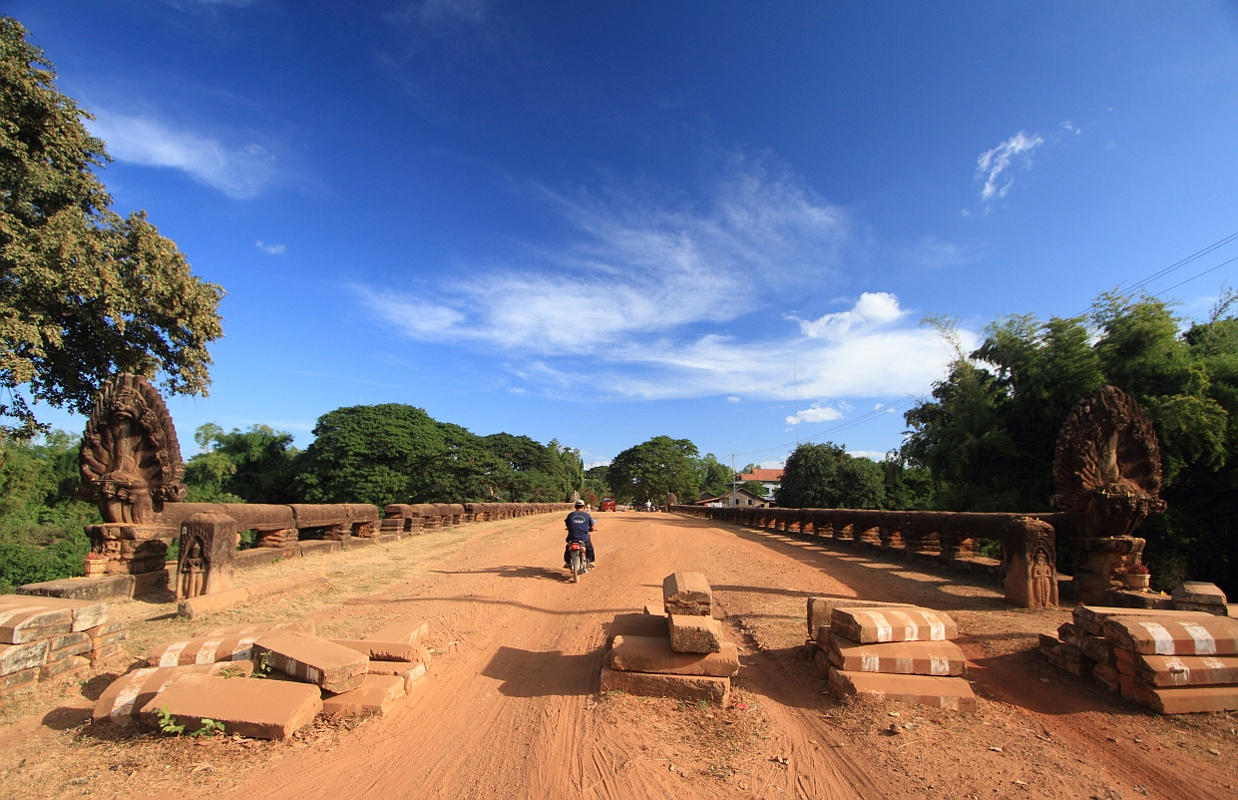
Spean Praptos front view

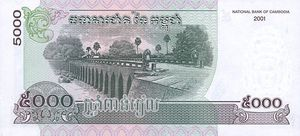
The bridge is depicted on the Cambodian 5,000 riel bank note

== Bibliography ==
- Rooney, Dawn F. (2005). Angkor: Cambodia's wondrous khmer temples (5th ed.). Odissey. ISBN 978-962-217-727-7.
