= Prek Tamak Bridge =

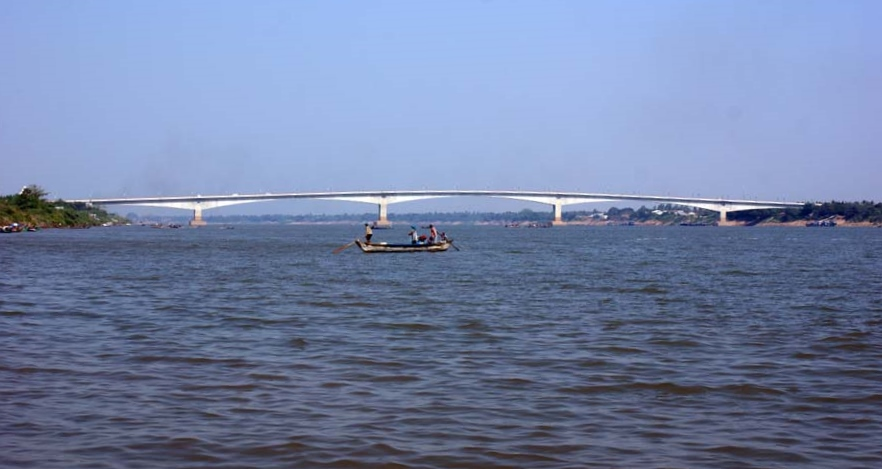
- Coordinates: 11°45′00″N 105°00′05″E
- Crosses: Mekong River
- Locale: Kandal Province, Cambodia

Characteristics
- Total length: 1,060 m
- Width: 13.5 m
- Longest span: 3 of 170 m each

History
- Opened: 2010

Location
- Interactive map of Prek Tamak Bridge

Prek Tamak Bridge is located approximately 40 kilometers north of Phnom Penh, Cambodia, and serves as a key transportation link between the eastern and western regions of the country by spanning the Mekong River.

The bridge was constructed by Shanghai Construction (Cambodia) Co., Ltd. According to Chinese Ambassador to Cambodia Pan Guangxue, the project was expected to contribute to Cambodia’s local socioeconomic development and standard of living. The structure measures 1,060 meters in length and 13.5 meters in width and is designed to support vehicle speeds of up to 60 kilometers per hour.

The total cost of the project was approximately US$43.5 million. Construction took place over a period of around 38 months, and the bridge officially opened to traffic in January 2011.
