= Chi Kraeng River =

River in Cambodia

Chi Kraeng River (Khmer: ស្ទឹងជីក្រែង; Steung Chi Kraeng, also spelled Stoĕng Chi Kreng) is a river in Cambodia. It is a major tributary of the Tonlé Sap. The name means "great ancestor" in Khmer.
