= Siem Reap River =

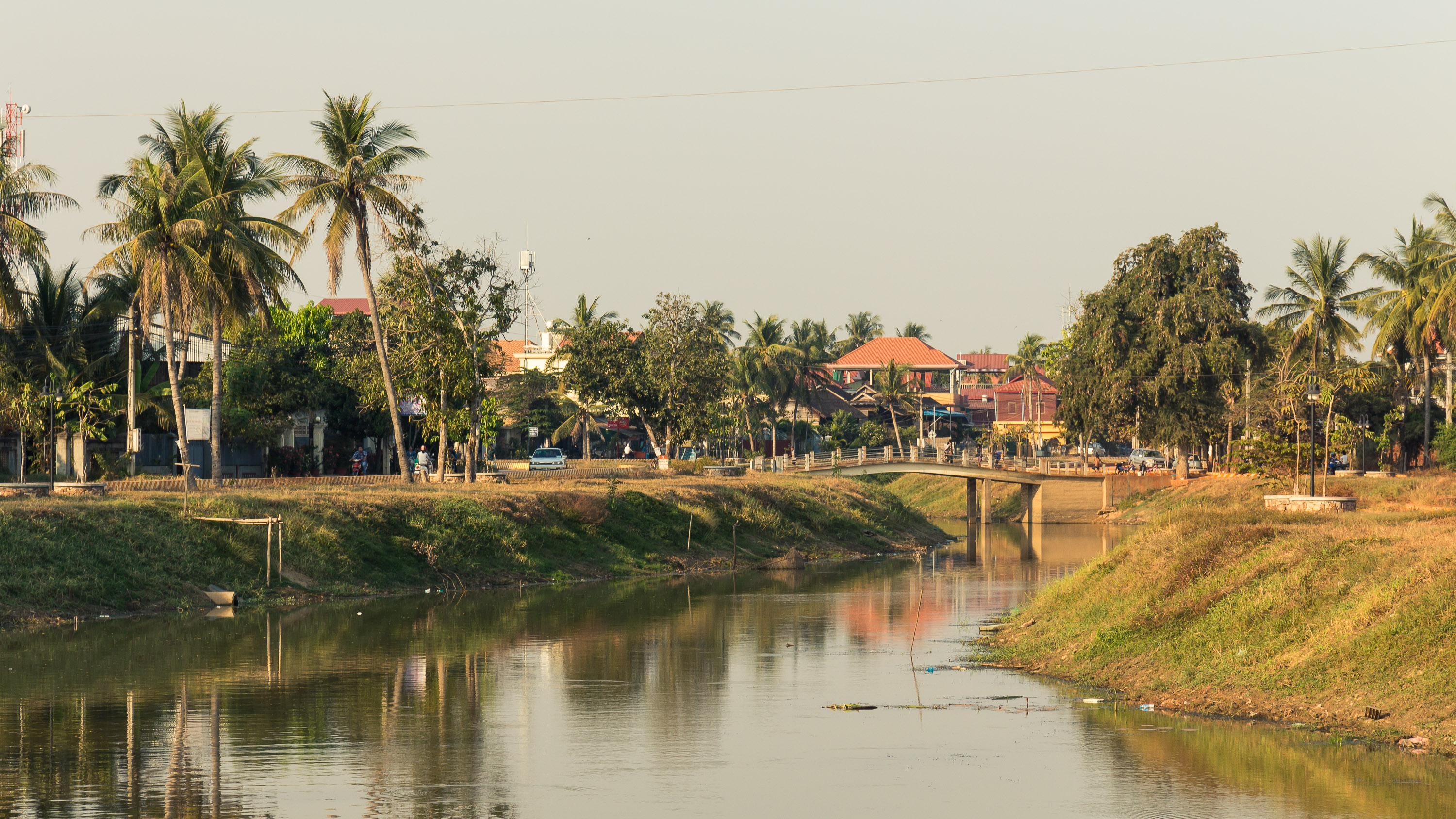
- Siem Reap River

Location
- Country: Cambodia

Physical characteristics
- Source
  - location: Phnom Kulen
  - elevation: 420 m
- Mouth
  - location: Tonle Sap
- Length: 80 km
- Basin size: 670 km2
- Discharge
  - average: 6.8 m^{3}/s (240 cu ft/s)

The Siem Reap River (Steung Siem Reap; Khmer: ស្ទឹងសៀមរាប) flows through Siem Reap Province, in north-west Cambodia. The Siem Reap River was originally an offtake channel constructed during the Angkor period, used to divert water from the Puok River southward, probably to the East Baray. Because of the straight nature of a channel, the water flowed much faster than in a natural river. This caused the bed of the channel to erode as much as 10 meters in some areas, and probably caused problems with diverting the water to the East Baray. Over the past thousand years, the channel has gained small meanders and a unique ecosystem, and thus it is more accurate to call it a river.
