= Transport in Cambodia =

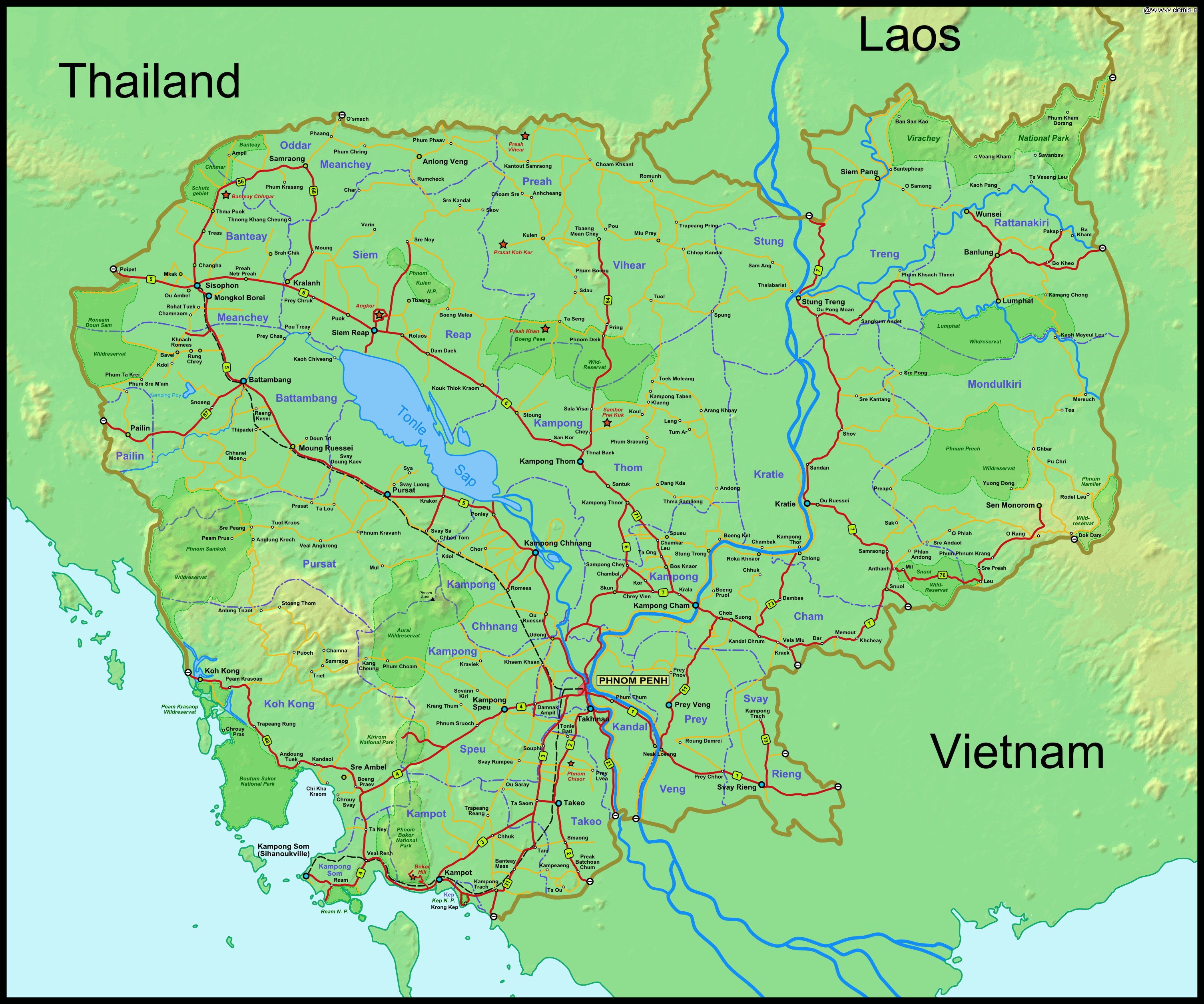
A national transport map of Cambodia

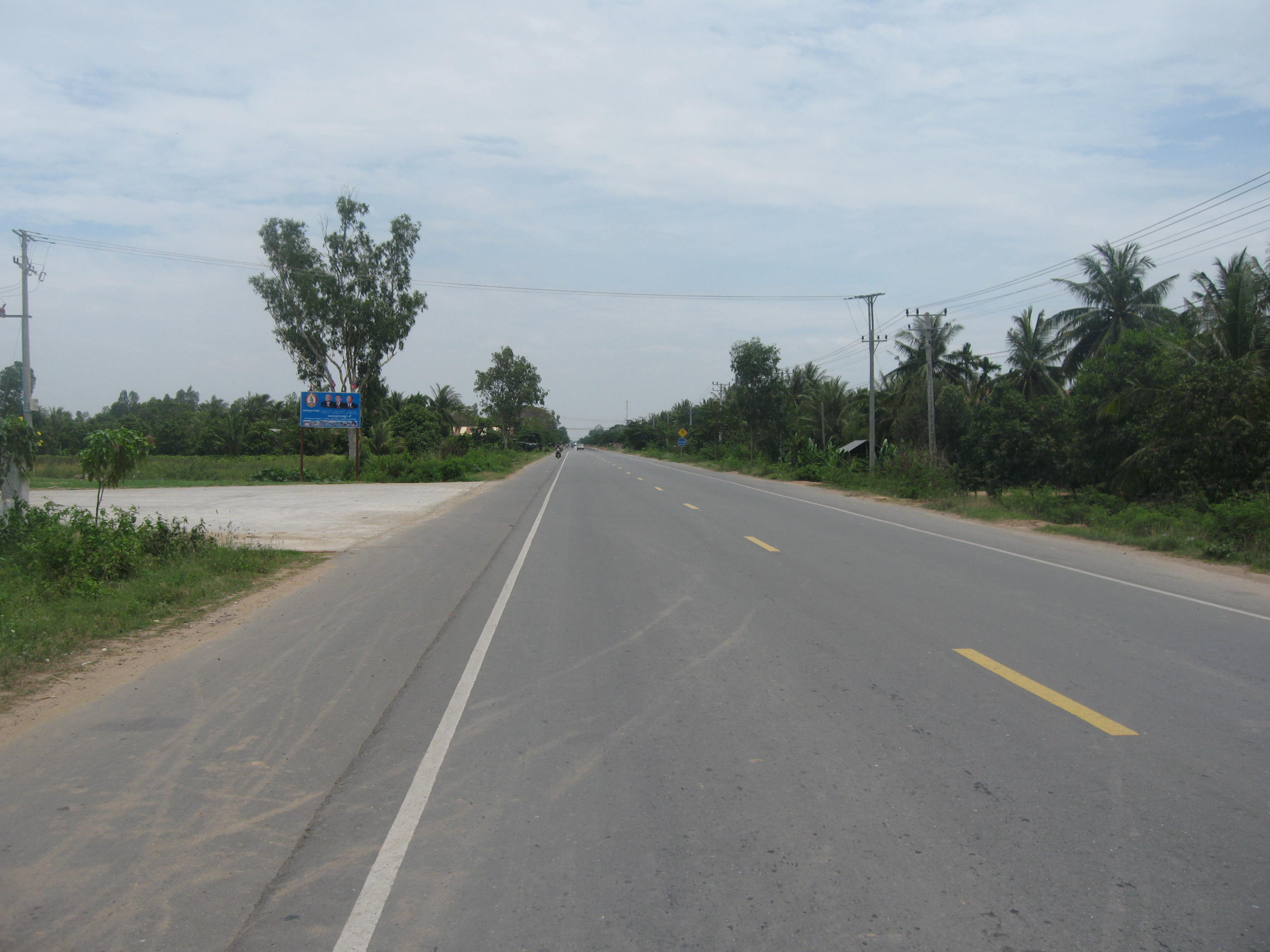
National Highway 1 - Kien Svay, Kandal Province

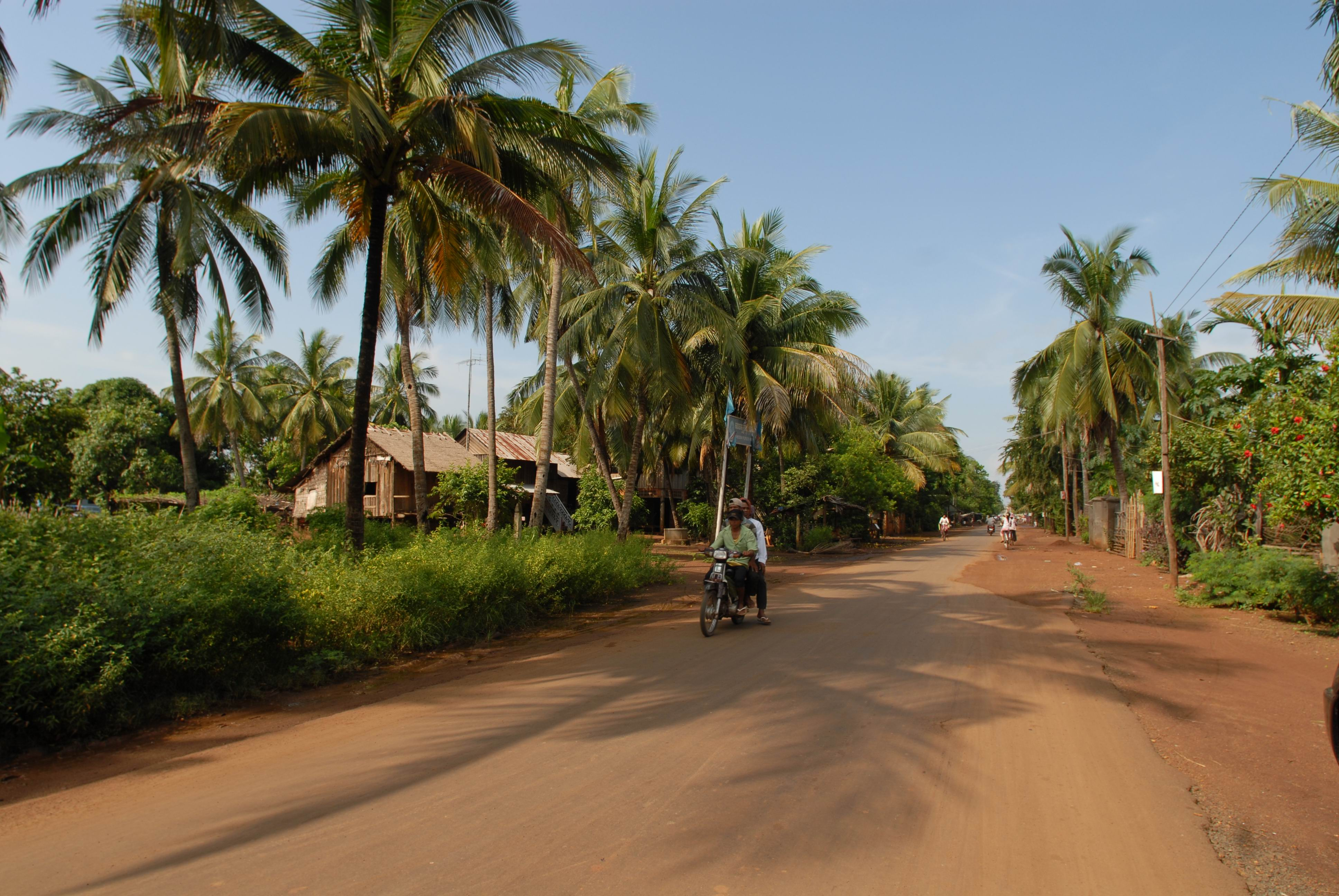
A rural road in Cambodia

The system of transport in Cambodia, was rudimentary in the past, severely damaged in the chaos that engulfed the nation in the latter half of the 20th century. The country's weak transport infrastructure hindered emergency relief efforts, exacerbating the logistical issues of procurement of supplies in general and their distribution. Cambodia received Soviet technical assistance and equipment to support the maintenance of the transportation network. In the last twenty years, however, significant improvements have been made, including an expressway, almost all of the major roads being paved, and two new major international airports - one in Siem Reap and one in Phnom Penh. Furthermore, ground has been broken on a canal that will allow cargo to go directly to the ocean, as well as planned new train lines.

== Road transport ==
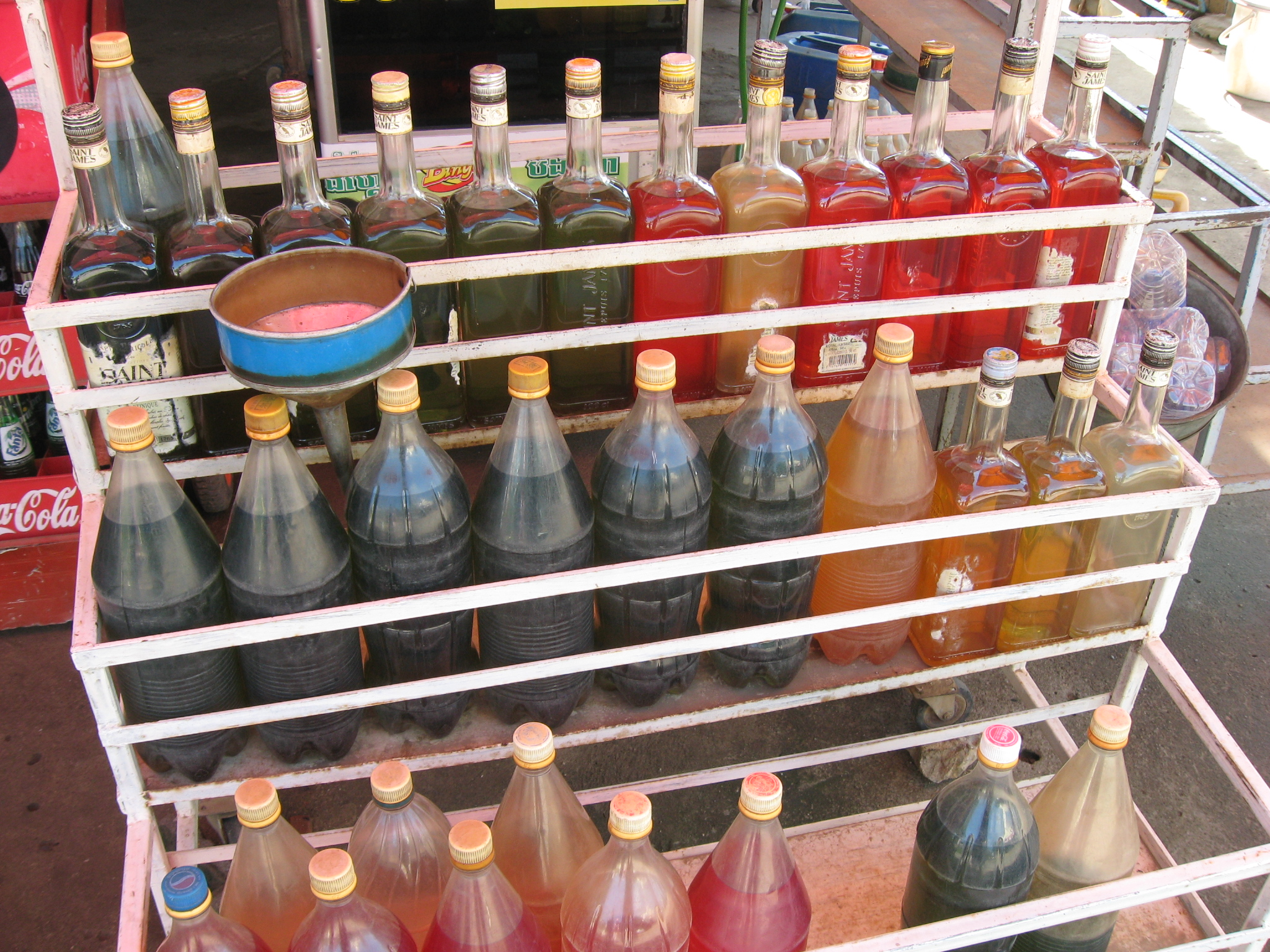
Bottled gasoline on sale, Battambang

=== Highway network ===
- Total - 38,257 km (2004)
  - Paved - 2,406 km (2004)
  - Unpaved - 35,851 km (2004)

Of the current total roadway network, only about 50% of the roads and highways are hard surfaced, all-weather, and in good condition. About 50% of the roads were constructed of crushed stone, gravel, or compacted earth. Secondary roads are of unimproved earth or were little more than tracks. In 1981 Cambodia opened a newly repaired section of National Route 1 which runs southeast from Phnom Penh to the Vietnamese border. The road, which suffered damage during the war years, was restored most probably by Vietnamese army engineers.

In the late-1980s, Cambodia's road network was both underutilized and unable to meet even the modest demands placed upon it by a preindustrial agrarian society. Commercial vehicles, such as trucks and buses, were insufficient in number and lacked the spare parts necessary to keep them running. Road construction and maintenance were ignored by a financially hard-pressed governments, while insurgents regularly destroyed bridges and rendered some routes unsafe for travel.

Cambodia is upgrading the main highways to international standards and most are vastly improved from 2006. Most main roads are now paved. And now road construction is on going from the Thailand border at Poipet to Siem Reap (Angkor Wat). Funded by over $3 billion of Chinese loans, Chinese companies have built 3,000 km (1,900 mi) of roads as well as several major bridges.

An expressway network is being developed, the 190km Phnom Penh-Sikhanoukville expressway (E4) opened in October 2022, the construction to Bavet started in June 2023.

Chart of 01/2014

National Highway	Code	Approx length		Origin	Terminus
National Highway 1	10001	167.10 km	103.83 mi	Phnom Penh	Bavet - Vietnam Border
National Highway 2	10002	120.60 km	74.94 mi	Phnom Penh	Phnom Den - Vietnam Border
National Highway 3	10003	202.00 km	125.52 mi	Phnom Penh	Kampot - Veal Renh (NH4)
National Highway 4	10004	226.00 km	140.43 mi	Phnom Penh	Sihanoukville
National Highway 5	10005	341.00 km	211.89 mi	Phnom Penh	Battambang - Poipet - Thai Border
National Highway 6A	10006A	76.00 km	47.22 mi	Phnom Penh	Skuon
National Highway 6	10006	416.00 km	258.49 mi	Skuon	Siem Reap - Sisophon (NH5)
National Highway 7	10007	509.17 km	316.38 mi	Skuon	Stung Treng - Laos Border
National Highway 8	10008	105.00 km	65.24 mi	NH6A - Prek Tamak Bridge	to NH7 near the Vietnam Border.

=== Other transport ===
Motorcycles are by far the most common transport medium in Cambodia. "Cyclo" (as hand-me-down French) or cycle rickshaws were popular in the 1990s but are increasingly replaced by remorques (carriages attached to motorcycles) and rickshaws imported from India. Cyclos are unique to Cambodia in that the cyclist sits behind the passenger(s) seat, as opposed to cycle rickshaws in neighbouring countries where the cyclist is at the front and pulls the carriage. With 78% mobile phone penetration rate, ride-hailing apps have become popular in recent years. The first locally owned ride-hailing app, ExNet taxi app, was launched in 2016, after which another locally developed PassApp taxi was also introduced.

The ExNet and PassApp use the same technology and architect for their application, except that ExNet is a taxi-based ride-hailing service while PassApp is more of rickshaw-based one. Uber and Grab joined the market in 2017. The entry and later merger of Uber and Grab did not negatively affect the local apps as the locals have the first-mover advantage and could secure a large number of patrons. As of today, PassApp is seen as an able competitor for the Singapore-based Grab in the Cambodian transport market. Thai Duong Bus Cambodia

Aside from the private-hire vehicles and ride-hailing service, public transport is also available but only in the capital. Similarly to most of the Southeast Asian countries, Cambodia has not developed its public transport fully. Phnom Penh city bus service started in 2015 with only three routes under the assistance of JICA. Today, Phnom Penh City Bus operates 13 routes.

== Railways ==
Two rail lines exist, both originating in Phnom Penh and totaling about 612 kilometers of 1 metre (3 ft 3 3/8 in) gauge single track. The first line or the northern line, built by The French colonial government, running from Phnom Penh to Poipet on the Thai border, between 1930 and 1940, with Phnom Penh Railway Station opening in 1932. The final connection with Thailand was completed by Royal State Railways in 1942. The service from Bangkok to Battambang was suspended when the French Indochinese Government resumed sovereignty over Battambang and the Sisophon area from Thailand on 17 December 1946, as Thailand was seen as a supporter of Khmer Issarak, the anti-French, Khmer nationalist political movement.

A third line is planned to connect Phnom Penh with Vietnam, the last missing link of the planned rail corridor between Singapore and the city of Kunming, China. A new north–south line is also planned. The lines from Phnom Penh to Sisophon and from Sisophon to Poipet have been rehabilitated; starting with Poipet to Srey Sisophon in April 2018 and Sisophon to Phnom Penh in early July (2018).

The active part, the southern line, of the network is the Phnom Penh-Sihanoukville line, with stops at Takeo and Kampot. The first line to be re-opened in Cambodia was the 118 km long route from Phnom Penh to Touk Meas and the complete southern line in May 2011 (or Toll Royal Railway). Toll Royal Railway Cambodia had been given a 30-year concession from The Royal Government of Cambodia to operate Cambodia's railway network.

=== Routes ===
Phnom Penh - Pursat - Moung Ruessei - Battambang - Sisophon - Poipet

Phnom Penh - Takeo - Touk Meas - Damnak Chang'aeur - Veal Renh - Sihanoukville

== Waterways ==
The nation's extensive inland waterways were important historically in domestic trade. The Mekong and the Tonlé Sap Rivers, their numerous tributaries, and the Tonlé Sap provided avenues of considerable length, including 3,700 kilometers navigable all year by craft drawing 0.6 meters and another 282 kilometers navigable to craft drawing 1.8 meters. In some areas, especially west of the Mekong River and north of the Tonle Sap River, the villages were completely dependent on waterways for communications. Launches, junks, or barges transport passengers, rice, and other food in the absence of roads and railways.

According to the Ministry of Communications, Transport, and Post, Cambodia's main ferry services crossing the Bassac River and the middle Mekong River were restored in 1985. The major Mekong River navigation routes also were cleared for traffic. Seaplane service to all waterways and islands is now offered by Aero Cambodia Airline.

=== Seaports and harbors ===
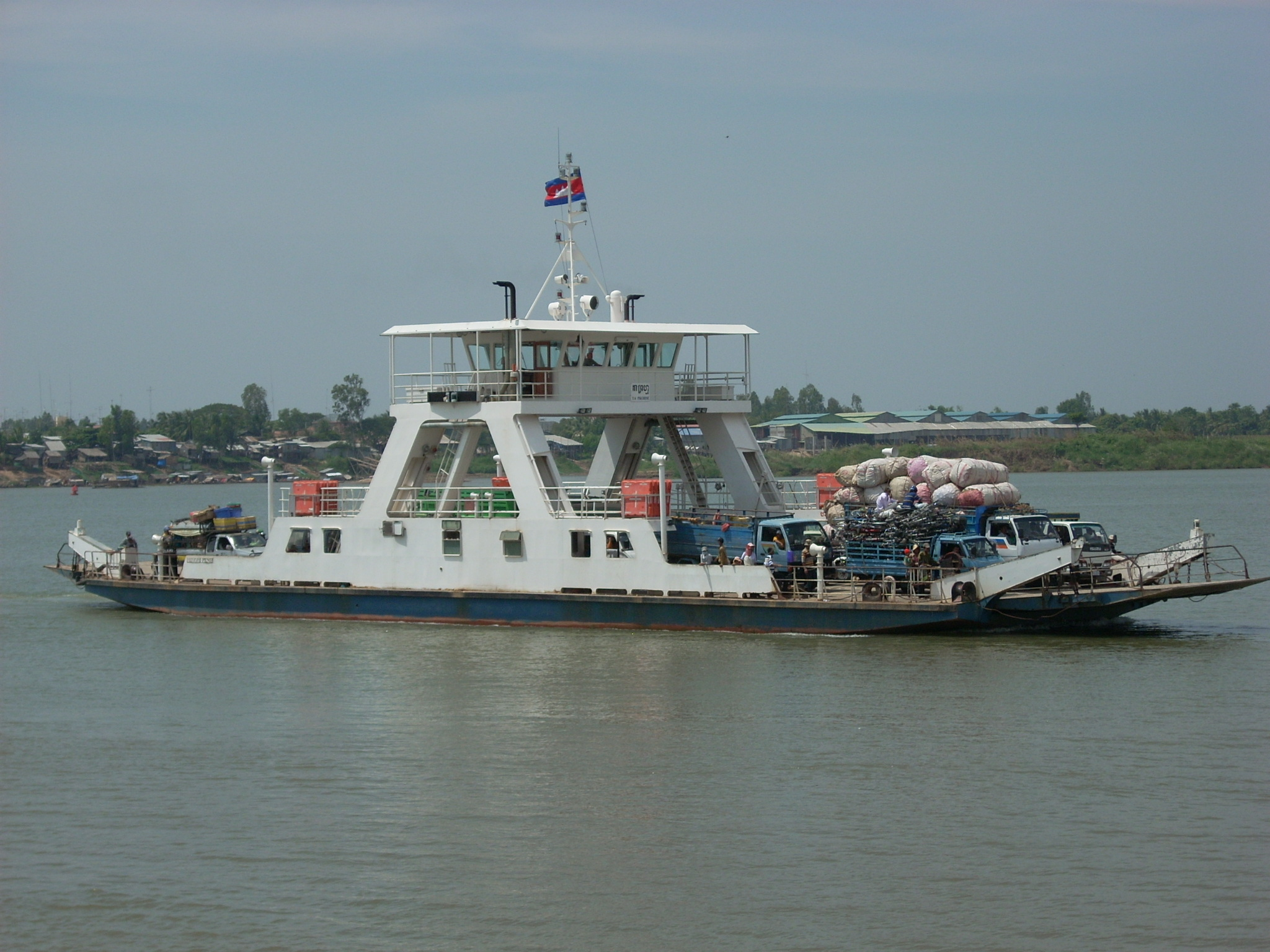
A ferry crossing the Mekong to Neak Leung town

Cambodia has two major ports, Phnom Penh Autonomous Port and Sihanoukville Autonomous Port, also known as Kampong Som, and five minor ports. Phnom Penh, at the junction of the Bassac, the Mekong, and the Tonle Sap Rivers, is the only river port capable of receiving 8,000-ton ships during the wet season and 5,000-ton ships during the dry season. In 2018 the port received 205,000 TEUs totalling 2.9 million tonnes. Its 2018 profits were US$7.35 million, up 36% from 2017.

Sihanoukville Port was built in 1960 with French assistance. In 1980, some 180 Soviet dockworkers, having brought with them forklifts and trucks, were reportedly working at Kampong Som as longshoremen or as instructors of unskilled Cambodian port workers. By 1984, approximately 1,500 Cambodian port workers were handling 2,500 tons of cargo per day. According to official statistics, Sihanoukville had handled only 769,500 tons in the four prior years (1979 to 1983), a level that contrasted sharply with the port's peacetime capacity of about one million tons of cargo per year.

==== Merchant marine ====
- Total: 626 ships (1,000 gross tonnage (GT) or over) totaling 953,105 GT/1,345,766 tonnes deadweight (DWT)
- Ships by type: bulk carrier 41, cargo ship 533, chemical tanker 10, container ship 8, passenger ship/cargo 6, petroleum tanker 11, refrigerated cargo 15, roll-on/roll-off 1, vehicle carrier 1 (2008)
- Note: 467 foreign-owned: Canada 2, China 193, Cyprus 7, Egypt 13, Gabon 1, Greece 3, Hong Kong 8, Indonesia 22, Japan 1, South Korea 22, Latvia 1, Lebanon 8, Netherlands 1, Romania 1, Russia 83, Singapore 4, Syria 48, Taiwan 1, Turkey 26, Ukraine 34, UAE 34, United States 6 (2008)

== Airports ==
Techo International Airport

The country possesses twenty-six airfields, of which only thirteen were usable in the mid-1980s. Eight airfields had permanent-surface runways. Techo International Airport in Phnom Penh is the largest airport and replaced Phnom Penh International Airport; it also serves as the main base for the renascent Cambodian Air Force.

Siem Reap-Angkor International Airport

Cambodia's second largest airport is Siem Reap-Angkor International Airport in the tourist city of Siem Reap, which replaced Siem Reap International Airport. Tourist traffic into Siem Reap International Airport saw passenger numbers overtake those of Phnom Penh in 2006. The main attraction for tourists in the area is the Angkor Wat temple complex.

Cambodia also opened a new Soviet-built airfield at Ream, Sihanouk International Airport in late-1983, which did not see commercial air traffic until January 2007. There are additional airports in Battambang and Stung Treng.

The new national airline Cambodia Angkor Air was launched in 2009, with an investment from Vietnam Airlines, later in January 2025, it was rebranded as Air Cambodia. Aero Cambodia Airline started business in 2011 offering flights to all airports and waterways with seaplanes. The low-cost airline AirAsia Cambodia was launched in 2022, with an investment from Malaysia AirAsia.

=== Airports with paved runways ===
- Total: 6 (2010)
  - 2,500 to 3,000 m: 3
  - 1,500 to 2,500 m: 2
  - 1,000 to 1,500 m: 1

=== Airports with unpaved runways ===
- Total: 11 (2010)
  - 1,500 to 2,500 m: 1
  - 1,000 to 1,500 m: 9
  - under 1,000 m: 1

=== Heliports ===
- 1 (2010)

== See also ==
- State Secretariat of Civil Aviation
- Ministry of Public Works and Transport, of Cambodia
- Transport in Phnom Penh
- Phnom Penh International Airport
