= List of airports in Cambodia =

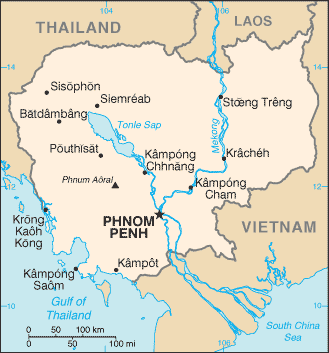
Map of Cambodia

This is a list of airports in Cambodia, sorted by location. Cambodia has only 3 major operating airports with commercial flights. The State Secretariat of Civil Aviation oversees the operations of all airports in Cambodia.

Cambodia, officially the Kingdom of Cambodia, is a country in Southeast Asia that borders Thailand to the west and northwest, Laos to the north and Vietnam to the east and southeast. In the south it faces the Gulf of Thailand. Phnom Penh is the capital and largest city. Siem Reap, a city located near the famed ruins of Angkor Wat is the gateway to the Angkor region, and is Cambodia's main destination for tourism. Battambang, the largest city in western Cambodia, is known for its rice production and Sihanoukville, a coastal city, is the primary sea port.

== Airports ==
=== Operational Airports ===
Type	City served	Province	ICAO	IATA	Airport name	Coordinates
Civil	Phnom Penh	Kandal	VDTI	KTI	Techo International Airport	11°21′46.5″N 104°54′59.8″E
Civil	Siem Reap	Siem Reap	VDSA	SAI	Siem Reap–Angkor International Airport	13°22′31″N 104°13′15″E
Civil	Sihanoukville	Sihanoukville	VDSV	KOS	Sihanouk International Airport	10°34′46″N 103°38′12″E
General	Botum Sakor, Khemarak Phoumin	Koh Kong	VDDS	DSY	Dara Sakor International Airport	10.915°N 103.224°E

=== Abandoned Airports ===
City served	Province	ICAO	IATA	Airport name	Coordinates
Ban Lung	Ratanakiri	VDRK	RBE	Ratanakiri Airport	13°43′55″N 106°59′01″E
Battambang	Battambang	VDBG	BBM	Battambang Airport	13°05′44″N 103°13′28″E
Kampong Cham	Kampong Cham	VDKC	KCA	Kampong Cham Airport	12°01′44″N 105°26′28″E
Kampong Chhnang	Kampong Chhnang	VDKH	KZC	Kampong Chhnang Airport	12°15′12″N 104°34′03″E
Kampong Thom	Kampong Thom		KZK	Kampong Thom Airport	12°47′02″N 104°55′51″E
Kampot	Kampot		KMT	Kampot Airport	10°37′59″N 104°09′44″E
Koh Kong	Koh Kong	VDKK	KKZ	Koh Kong Airport	11°36′47″N 102°59′51″E
Krakor	Pursat	VDSY	KZD	Krakor Airport	12°32′14″N 104°08′54″E
Kratié	Kratié	VDKT	KTI	Kratié Airport	12°29′22″N 106°03′18″E
Pailin	Pailin		PAI	Pailin Airport	
Senmonorom	Mondulkiri	VDMK	MWV	Mondulkiri Airport	12°27′45″N 107°11′13″E
Stung Treng	Stung Treng	VDST	TNX	Stung Treng Airport	13°31′54″N 106°00′52″E
Svay Rieng	Svay Rieng		SVR	Svay Rieng Airport	
Thbeng Meanchey	Preah Vihear		OMY	Thbeng Meanchey Airport	13°45′37″N 104°58′18″E

=== Closed Airports ===
City served	Province	ICAO	IATA	Airport name	Coordinates
Phnom Penh	Phnom Penh	VDPP	PNH	Phnom Penh International Airport	11°32′47″N 104°50′38″E
Siem Reap	Siem Reap	VDSR	REP	Siem Reap International Airport	13°24′38″N 103°48′46″E

== See also ==
- List of airlines of Cambodia
- Transport in Cambodia
- List of airports by ICAO code: V#VD - Cambodia
- Wikipedia:WikiProject Aviation/Airline destination lists: Asia#Cambodia
