= KZD =

KZD or kzd may refer to:

- KZD, the IATA code for Krakor Airport, Poŭthĭsăt, Cambodia
- KZD, the station code for Khudozai railway station, Pakistan
- kzd, the ISO 639-3 code for Kadai language, Indonesia
