= List of airlines of Cambodia =

This is a list of airlines currently operating in Cambodia.

== Scheduled airlines ==
Airline	Image	IATA	ICAO	Callsign	Commenced operations	Notes
Air Cambodia		K6	KHV	CAMBODIA AIR	2009	Techo International Airport, Siem Reap–Angkor International Airport
AirAsia Cambodia		KT	KTC	RED NAGA	2022	Techo International Airport, Siem Reap–Angkor International Airport
Cambodia Airways		KR	KME	GIANT IBIS	2017	Techo International Airport
Sky Angkor Airlines		ZA	SWM	SKY ANGKOR	2014	Techo International Airport, Siem Reap–Angkor International Airport

== See also ==
- List of defunct airlines of Cambodia
- List of airports in Cambodia
- List of airlines
