= Air Cambodia =

Flag carrier of Cambodia

Air Cambodia អាកាសចរណ៍ជាតិកម្ពុជា
IATA	ICAO	Call sign
K6	KHV	CAMBODIA AIR
- Founded: 28 July 2009; 17 years ago (as Cambodia Angkor Air)
- Commenced operations: 1 January 2025; 22 months ago (as Air Cambodia)
- Hubs: Phnom Penh; Siem Reap
- Focus cities: Ho Chi Minh City
- Frequent-flyer program: AngkorWards
- Fleet size: 7
- Destinations: 14
- Parent company: Royal Cambodian Government (30%); Xing Gang Investment Group (28%); 7TRIP International Co., Ltd (28%); Vietnam Airlines (14%)
- Headquarters: Phnom Penh, Cambodia
- Key people: Mao Havannall (chairman); Zhan David (CEO)
- Employees: > 300
- Website: aircambodia.com

Air Cambodia (Khmer: អាកាសចរណ៍ជាតិកម្ពុជា), formerly known as Cambodia Angkor Air, is the national flag carrier airline of Cambodia, with its corporate headquarters and main hub in Phnom Penh. The company slogan is "Proudly Serve the Kingdom".

== History ==
=== Early years ===
Air Cambodia is a full-service airline founded in July 2009 by both the Cambodian Government and Vietnam Airlines with an initial capital of $100 million. It offers both Business and Economy class on-board its Airbus aircraft, while only Economy class is available on board the ATR 72. It replaced national airline Royal Air Cambodge, which ceased operations in 2001, and concentrates on serving tourist routes within Asia, most notably catering for visitors of Angkor Wat in Siem Reap. It commenced operations on 28 July 2009. The airline was established as a joint venture by the Cambodian government (51%) and Vietnam Airlines (49%), the latter allowing for codeshare flights. All of its fleet and most of its staff are leased from Vietnam Airlines.

On 28 July 2009, Air Cambodia launched flights with its ATR 72 on the following routes; Phnom Penh – Siem Reap, Phnom Penh – Ho Chi Minh City and Siem Reap – Ho Chi Minh City. Air Cambodia started codesharing with Vietnam Airlines and uses "VN" in place of its airline code "K6" with codeshare flight numbers on Vietnam routes. On 2 September 2009, the flag carrier received a new Airbus A321.

=== 2010s ===
On 14 December 2011, the airline started up a second domestic route within Cambodia, operating a thrice weekly Siem Reap – Sihanoukville service on board an ATR 72 turboprop.

On 30 November 2012, the airline commenced flights to Thailand, between Siem Reap – Bangkok Suvarnabhumi Airport daily, breaking the monopoly of Thai carrier, Bangkok Airways, on this route. The route is operated by CAA's ATR 72 turboprop. On 31 March 2013, Cambodia Angkor Air increased the frequency of Siem Reap to Bangkok, to include a second daily flight. In July later that year, it was increased again to three daily flights.

On 7 January 2013, the airline revealed the launch of Hanoi services from both its hubs at Phnom Penh and Siem Reap, with one daily flight each on the Airbus A321. This was the second destination in Vietnam to be served by Air Cambodia. On 1 February 2013, the airline launched its second route to Bangkok Suvarnabhumi Airport from Phnom Penh. Flights are operated daily with an Airbus A321. On 6 March 2013, the airline forecasted a loss for the first time, due to the rapid expansion and increased exposure to competition. On 6 March 2013, the airline adjusted the Sihanoukville route, where the existing 3 weekly Siem Reap – Sihanoukville return service was rerouted via Phnom Penh, with the flight operating as Siem Reap – Sihanoukville – Phnom Penh – Siem Reap. On 14 July 2013, the airline commenced charter operations on the Siem Reap – Xiamen route. On 26 September 2013, the airline commenced its inaugural flights to China breaking the monopoly of China Southern Airlines who had operated a daily frequency, which switched to a frequency of 11 flights. The route is Guangzhou- Siem Reap, operating daily using an Airbus A320. On 26 December 2013, the airline commences its seasonal Siem Reap – Hangzhou route. Also on 26 December 2013, the airline commenced new scheduled services to Shanghai–Pudong from both its hubs at Siem Reap and Phnom Penh each with four flights per week with their Airbus A321 aircraft.

On 18 and 23 January 2014, Air Cambodia started its charter flight to Wenzhou and Zhengzhou. On 1 February 2014, charter flights from Sieam Reap to Fuzhou began.

On 16 January 2015, the airline launched its charter flight to Singapore Changi International Airport with an Airbus A321. On 25 October 2015, the national carrier launched new intra-Indo-China routes. There are connecting flights between Vietnam, Cambodia, and Laos. The airline plans to operate the Ho Chi Minh City – Phnom Penh – Vientiane – Hanoi route 3 times a week, using Airbus A321 aircraft. They will be using Vietnam Airline's code, VN. Vietnam Airlines operate on this route daily. Air Cambodia's K6 code will also appear on Vietnam Airlines' flight on this route. On 30 October 2015, Cambodia Angkor Air resumed its Siem Reap – Shanghai route. On 16 December 2015, the airline launched a new route, Siem Reap – Beijing, with their new A320. On 25 December 2015, Air Cambodia started its charter flight to Seoul-Incheon.

On 30 December 2016, the airline resumed its Siem Reap-Hanoi flight while their new A320 entered service in the CAAC.

=== 2020s ===
On 16 April 2020, anticipating a major global travel crisis due to COVID-19, Vietnam Airlines announced that it sold its 49% stake in Air Cambodia to an undisclosed buyer.

On 22 March 2022, as reported by the Khmer Times, the Chinese media platform Sohu claimed, citing unnamed sources, that Xing Gang Investment Group utilized venture capital funds to secure a 28% stake in Cambodia Angkor Air. This acquisition positions the group as the second-largest shareholder, following the Cambodian government. Meanwhile, at the end of 2024, Vietnam Airlines is still keeping a 14% stake in the carrier.

On January 1, 2025, Cambodia Angkor Air underwent a rebranding and officially changed its name to Air Cambodia.

On January 15, 2026, Air Cambodia officially unveil its new Logo and Aircraft Livery during a ceremony presided by H.E. Mao Havannall, Minister in charge of the State Secretariat of Civil Aviation (SSCA) and Chairman of Air Cambodia.

== Destinations ==
As of September 2025, Air Cambodia flies (or has flown) to the following destinations:

Country	City	Airport	Notes	Refs
Cambodia	Koh Kong	Dara Sakor International Airport		
Cambodia	Phnom Penh	Phnom Penh International Airport	Airport Closed	
Cambodia	Phnom Penh	Techo International Airport	Hub	
Cambodia	Siem Reap	Siem Reap International Airport	Airport Closed	
Cambodia	Siem Reap	Siem Reap–Angkor International Airport	Hub	
Cambodia	Sihanoukville	Sihanouk International Airport		
China	Beijing	Beijing Capital International Airport	Terminated	
China	Changsha	Changsha Huanghua International Airport	Terminated	
China	Chengdu	Chengdu Tianfu International Airport	Terminated	
China	Chongqing	Chongqing Jiangbei International Airport	Terminated	
China	Fuzhou	Fuzhou Changle International Airport		
China	Guangzhou	Guangzhou Baiyun International Airport		
China	Haikou	Haikou Meilan International Airport	Terminated	
China	Hangzhou	Hangzhou Xiaoshan International Airport	Terminated	
China	Hefei	Hefei Xinqiao International Airport	Terminated	
China	Nanchang	Nanchang Changbei International Airport	Terminated	
China	Nanning	Nanning Wuxu International Airport		
China	Ningbo	Ningbo Lishe International Airport	Terminated	
China	Shanghai	Shanghai Pudong International Airport	Terminated	
China	Shenzhen	Shenzhen Bao'an International Airport		
China	Shenyang	Shenyang Taoxian International Airport	Terminated	
China	Tianjin	Tianjin Binhai International Airport	Terminated	
China	Wenzhou	Wenzhou Longwan International Airport	Terminated	
China	Wuxi	Wuxi Shuofang Airport	Terminated	
China	Xiamen	Xiamen Gaoqi International Airport	Terminated	
China	Zhengzhou	Zhengzhou Xinzheng International Airport		
Hong Kong	Hong Kong	Hong Kong International Airport		
India	Delhi	Indira Gandhi International Airport		
Japan	Tokyo	Narita International Airport		
Laos	Luang Prabang	Luang Prabang International Airport	Terminated	
Laos	Vientiane	Wattay International Airport	Terminated	
Palau	Koror	Roman Tmetuchl International Airport	Terminated	
Singapore	Singapore	Changi Airport	Terminated	
Thailand	Bangkok	Suvarnabhumi Airport		
Vietnam	Da Nang	Da Nang International Airport		
Vietnam	Hanoi	Noi Bai International Airport		
Vietnam	Ho Chi Minh City	Tan Son Nhat International Airport	Focus city	
Vietnam	Nha Trang	Cam Ranh International Airport		
Vietnam	Phu Quoc	Phu Quoc International Airport		

=== Codeshare agreements ===
Air Cambodia has codeshare with the following airlines:

- Etihad Airways
- Turkish Airlines
- Vietnam Airlines

== Fleet ==
=== Current fleet ===
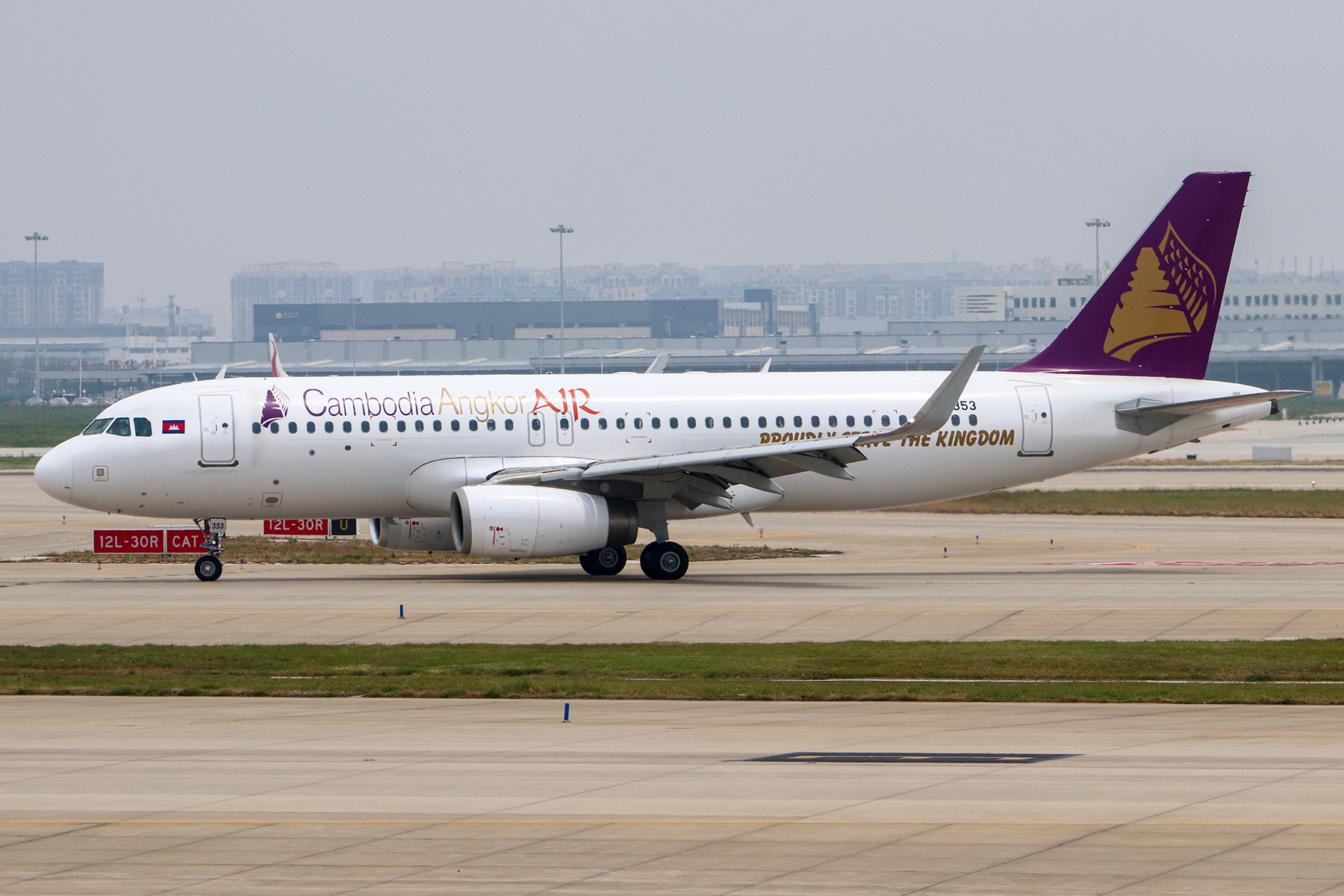
Airbus A320-232 of Air Cambodia at Zhengzhou Xinzheng International Airport

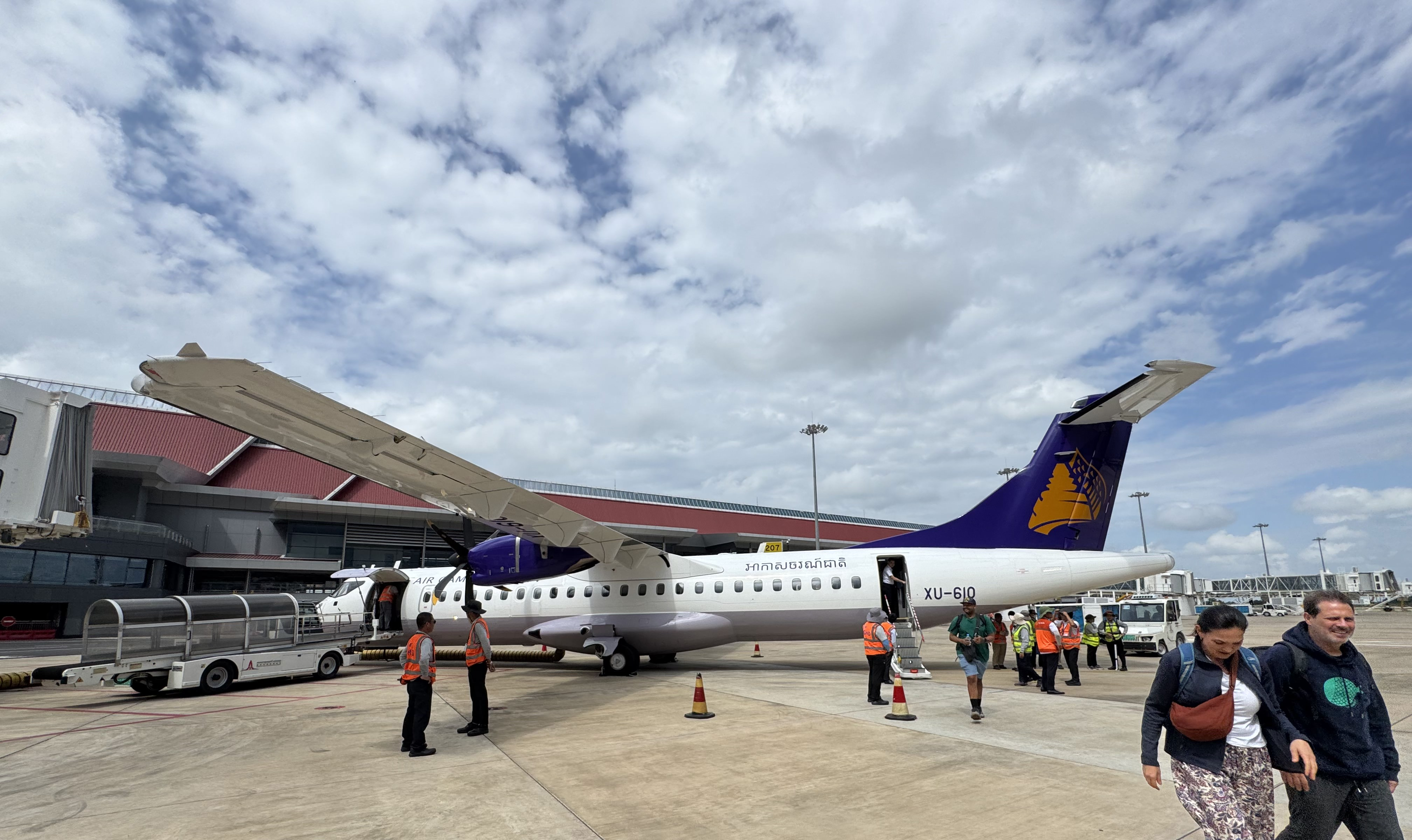
ATR 72-600 of Air Cambodia at Siem Reap–Angkor International Airport

As of August 2025, Air Cambodia operates the following aircraft:

Air Cambodia fleet
Aircraft	In service	Orders	Passengers			Notes
Aircraft	In service	Orders	C	Y	Total	Notes
Airbus A320-200	2	—	—	180	180	
Airbus A321-200	1	—	16	168	184	
ATR 72-600	3	—	—	72	72	
Boeing 737 MAX 8	—	10	TBA			Order with 10 options.
Comac C909	—	20	TBA			
Total	6	30				

=== Future fleet ===
- Deputy Prime Minister Sun Chanthol stated that Air Cambodia will negotiate to purchase 10 Boeing 737 Max 8 aircraft and has an option to purchase 10 more. The spokesperson of the State Secretariat of Civil Aviation stated that eight aircraft will be delivered by 2031.
- Air Cambodia and the Commercial Aircraft Corporation of China (COMAC) both said on 9 September 2025 they had signed a memorandum of understanding in China for 10 confirmed C909 orders, with the option to purchase 10 more.

== Livery and logo ==
The logo is inspired by Cambodia's national bird, the Giant Ibis — known in Khmer as ត្រយ៉ង (Tror Yorng). In Cambodian traditional culture, Tror Yorng is a symbol of protection, strength, and sacred good luck. The new logo features a bird's beak pointing upward at a 45-degree angle. It combines the bird's 18 feathers with the shape of aircraft engine fan blades, symbolizing long-distance flight, strong power, and the airline's continuous upward growth.

== Services ==
=== On-board ===
Air Cambodia offers their inflight magazines titled ANGKOR and has been issuing issues since 2014. They also offer meal services for most flights. These options range from teas, Coca-Cola, noodles and meat. They also offer advance ordering of meals 24 hours before departure.

=== Flight pass and ancillary products ===
Air Cambodia has a partnership with USA based Optiontown to run a prepaid flight subscription platform called Flight Pass, which enables customers to pre-purchase flights at the best available price and decide when they want to travel at a later date. Under the same partnership, there is an option for passengers to upgrade their ticket to Business or First Class for a low price. In addition, passengers can pre-purchase their preferred seat assignment, extra baggage, lounge access, and empty seats next to them on the flight.

== See also ==
- Transport in Cambodia
- List of airlines of Cambodia
