= Sihanouk International Airport =

Cambodia's third international airport, located in Sihanoukville, Cambodia

Sihanouk International Airport អាកាសយានដ្ឋានអន្តរជាតិខេត្តព្រះសីហនុ Akasayeanatthan Antaracheat Khaet Preah Seihanu

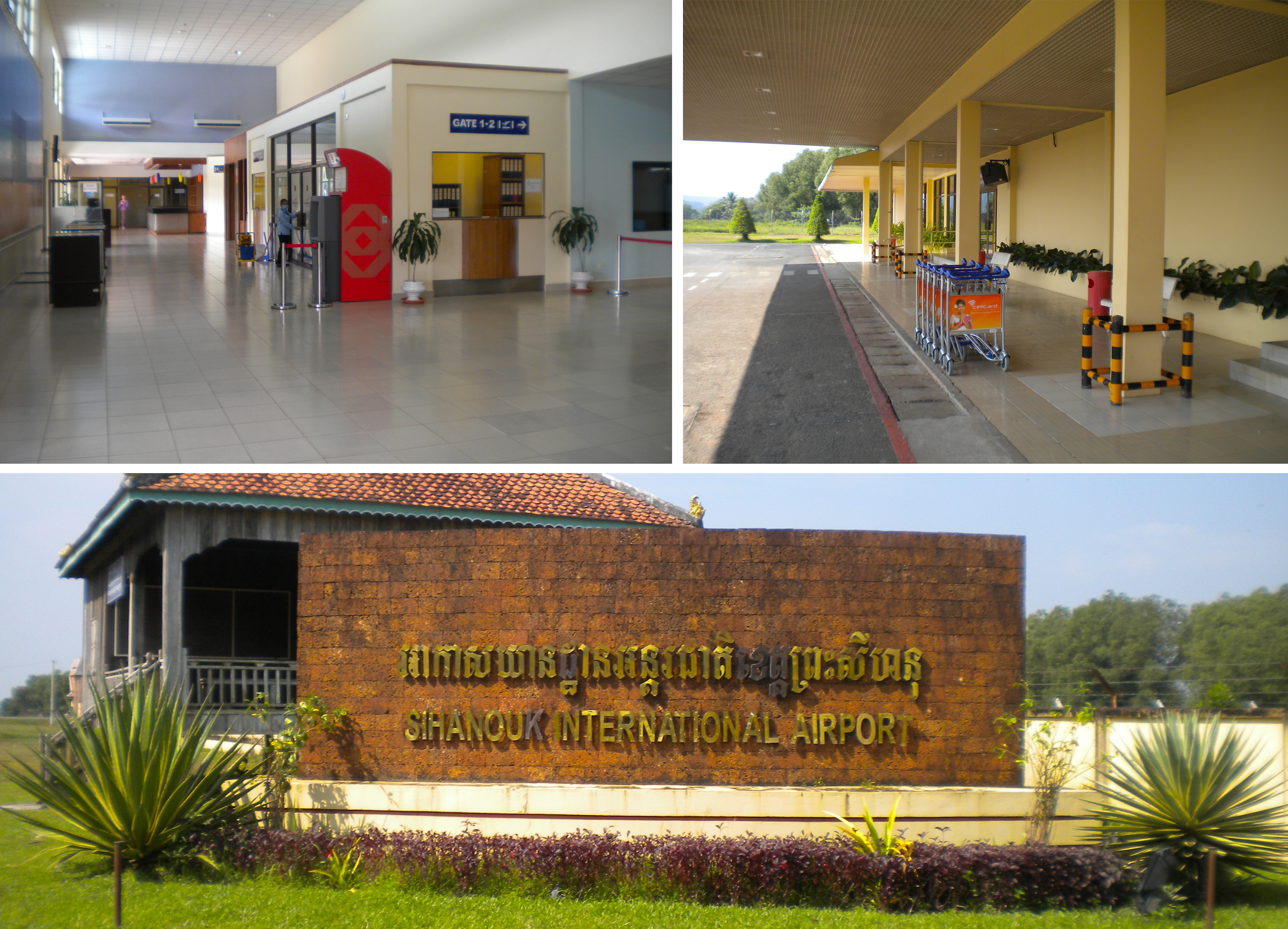
- IATA: KOS; ICAO: VDSV

Summary
- Airport type: Public
- Owner: Cambodia Airports
- Operator: Vinci Airports
- Location: Sihanoukville, Cambodia
- Elevation AMSL: 40 ft (12 m)
- Coordinates: 10°34′48″N 103°38′13″E
- Website: kos.cambodia-airports.aero

Map
- Location of airport in Cambodia

Runways
Direction	Length		Surface
Direction	m	ft	Surface
03/21	3,300	10,827	Asphalt

Statistics (2025)
- Passenger movements: 172,000 ▲84%
- Aircraft movements: 2669 ▲29%
- www.vinci-airports.com

Sihanouk International Airport (formerly Sihanoukville International Airport; Khmer: អាកាសយានដ្ឋានអន្តរជាតិខេត្តព្រះសីហនុ) (IATA: KOS, ICAO: VDSV), located 20 kilometres (12 mi) east of Sihanoukville City in Sihanoukville Province, is Cambodia's third largest international airport. It is named, like the province itself, after King Norodom Sihanouk. The airport is also known as Kang Keng Airport (Khmer: អាកាសយានដ្ឋានកងកេង). The IATA code KOS is derived from Sihanoukville's alternative name, "Kampong Som".

== History ==
The airfield was originally constructed in the 1960s with assistance from the Soviet Union. After a long period of dormancy during and after the Khmer Rouge era, the airport formally reopened on 5 January 2007. The runway was extended to a length of 3,300 metres (10,827 ft) in order to accommodate 4E class aircraft. The 2 existing taxiways were widened and a cargo apron for 4E class aircraft was added. However, after the crash of PMTair Flight U4 241 in June 2007 shortly before landing, scheduled passenger flight service to the airport was discontinued until 2011.

Cambodia Angkor Air started a tri-weekly service from Angkor International Airport in Siem Reap on 14 December 2011. The service was further adjusted to continue Phnom Penh as well, operating a triangle route, Siem Reap-Sihanoukville-Phnom Penh-Siem Reap, starting on 31 March 2013. Starting in September 2013, the airline was scheduled to provide a Siem Reap-Sihanoukville route twice daily during the high peak season.

== Airfield summary ==
- Runway length: 3,300 metres
- Runway Width: 40 metres + shoulders
- Perpendicular Taxiway: 1
- Number of stands: 5
- Navigation aids and visual aids:
  - VOR/DME (KOS 116.00 10°35'22.8N 102°38'31.5)
  - NDB
  - PAPI
  - Meteo
- Rescue and firefighting: ICAO Level Cat 5

== Airlines and destinations ==
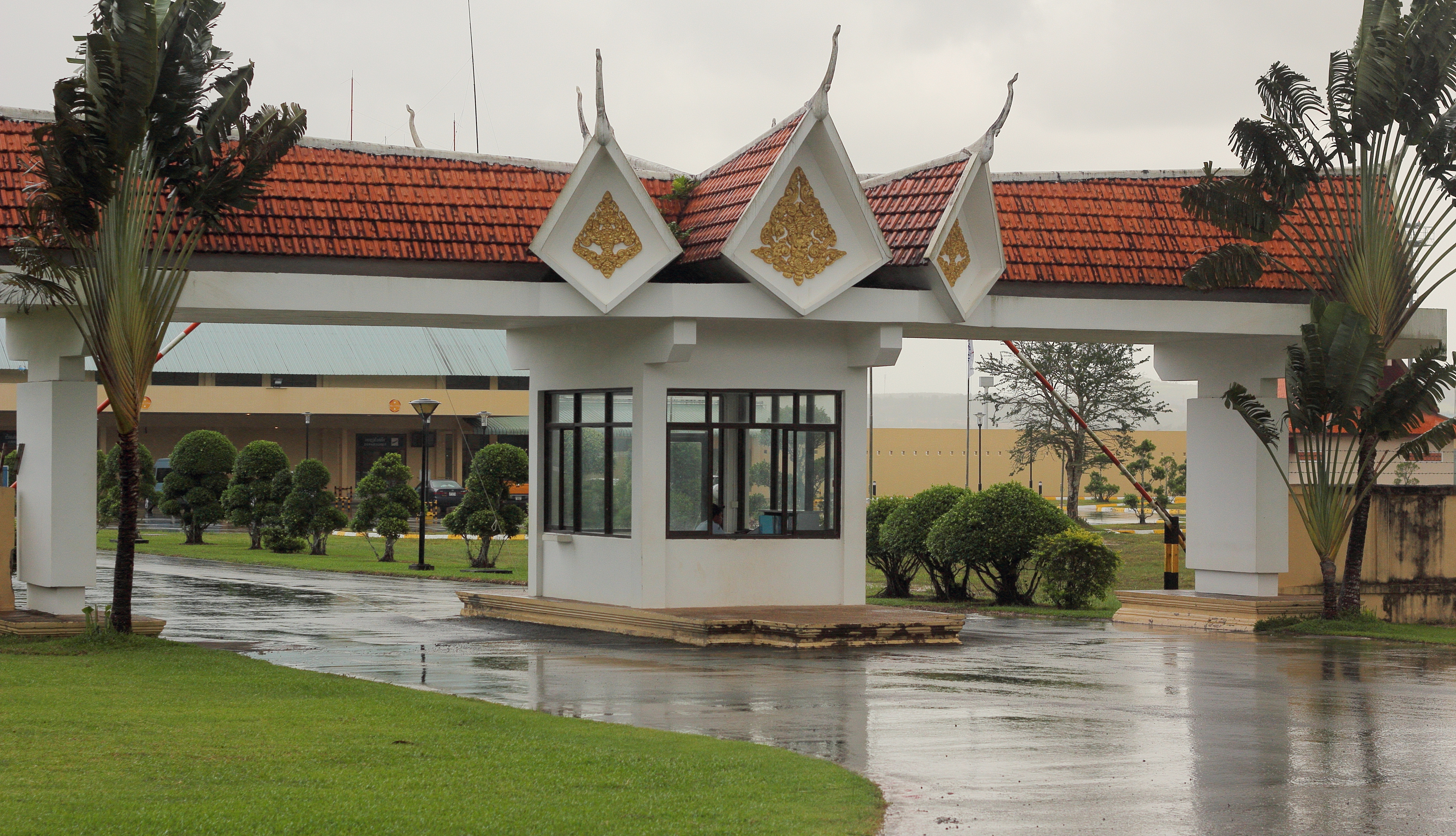
Sihanouk International Airport main gate

Airlines	Destinations
AirAsia	Kuala Lumpur–International
AirAsia Cambodia	Kuala Lumpur–International
Air Cambodia	Bangkok–Suvarnabhumi, Ho Chi Minh City, Shenzhen, Siem Reap
Cambodia Airways	Chengdu–Tianfu, Guangzhou, Siem Reap
Ruili Airlines	Kunming, Wuxi
Sky Angkor Airlines	Guangzhou, Macau, Xiamen, Kuala Lumpur–International
TUI Airways	Seasonal charter: Prague (begins 19 December 2026)

== Statistics ==
Year	Total Passenger movements	Change %	Total Aircraft movement	Change %
2012	13,022	Steady	349	Steady
2013	19,713	▲51.38	570	▲63.32
2014	43,400	▲120.16	998	▲75.09
2015	94,630	▲118.04	1,853	▲85.67
2016	156,887	▲65.79	2,627	▲41.77
2017	338,000	▲115.4	5,575	▲112.2
2018	651,000	▲92.6	8,274	▲48.4
2019	1,680,000	▲158.1	17,824	▲115.4
2020	221,000	▼86.9	3,151	▼82.3
2021	17,000	▼92	654	▼79
2022	39,000	▲NA	1,802	▲NA
2023	55,000	▲38	1,878	▲4.2
2024	93,000	▲71	2,075	▲10
2025	172,000	▲84	2,669	▲29

== Accidents and incidents ==
- On 7 July 1972, a Douglas DC-3 cargo plane of Cambodia Air Commercial registered as XW-PHW overran the runway on landing at Sihanouk International Airport without fatalities but was damaged beyond economic repair.
- On 25 June 2007, an Antonov An-24 (XU-U4A) operating as PMTair Flight U4 241 en route from Siem Reap to Sihanoukville crashed about five minutes before landing, killing all 22 passengers and crew on board.

== See also ==
- Techo International Airport
- Siem Reap–Angkor International Airport
