= Sky Angkor Airlines =

Cambodian airline

Sky Angkor Airlines ស្កាយ អង្គរ អ៊ែឡាញ

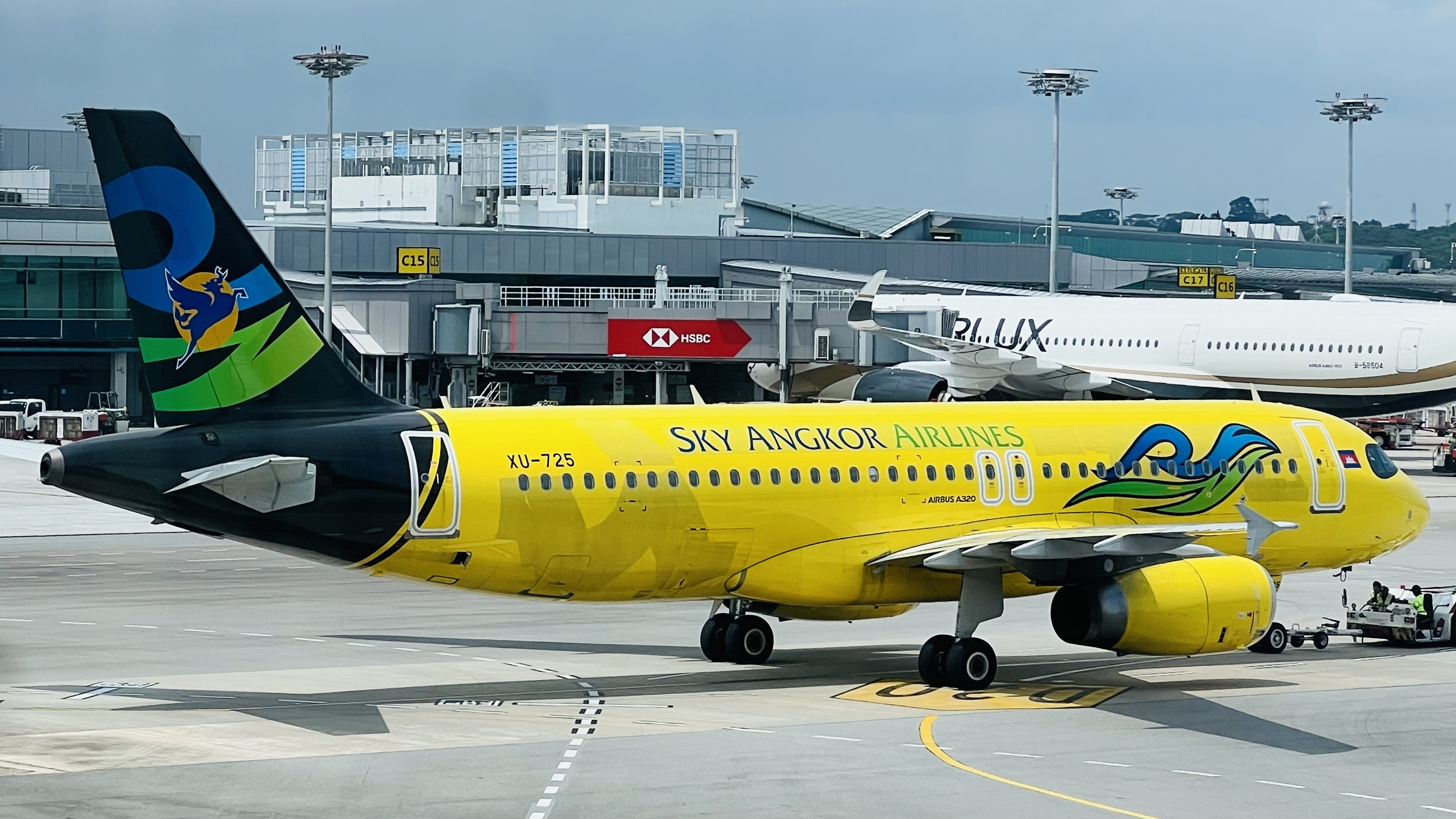
- Sky Angkor Airlines Airbus A320 at Changi Airport
IATA	ICAO	Call sign
ZA	SWM	SKY ANGKOR
- Founded: 2010; 16 years ago
- Commenced operations: 13 June 2011; 15 years ago
- Operating bases: Phnom Penh; Siem Reap
- Fleet size: 5
- Destinations: 6
- Headquarters: Siem Reap, Cambodia
- Key people: Mak Rady (CEO)
- Website: www.skyangkorair.com

Sky Angkor Airlines Inc. (Khmer: ស្កាយ អង្គរ អ៊ែឡាញ), formerly known as Skywings Asia Airlines, is an airline based in Cambodia. Its main hub is at Siem Reap–Angkor International Airport, and its second hub is at Techo International Airport. Sky Angkor Airlines is the first Cambodian airline to operate the Airbus A320neo.

== History ==
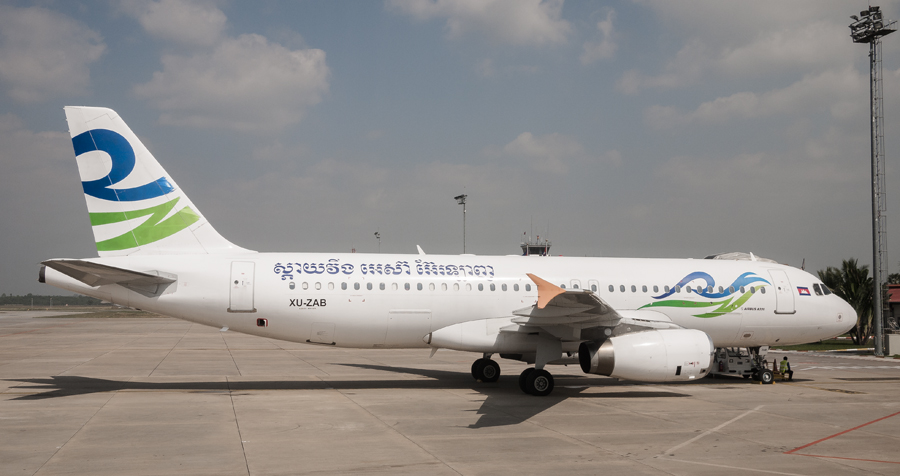
A Skywings Asia Airlines Airbus A320 at Siem Reap International Airport, Cambodia in 2013

Founded in 2010, Skywings Asia Airlines received its 'Approval of Foreign International Transportation Business'. The airline is a joint venture of Korean and Cambodian investors, with a focus on the Korean travel market.

On 13 June 2011, it operated its inaugural flight on the route Siem Reap - Seoul-Incheon - Hanoi - Siem Reap, using a McDonnell Douglas MD-83 aircraft. The airline added its first Airbus A320 in July of the same year.

On 30 November 2014, Skywings Asia Airlines formally ceased operations and rebranded as Sky Angkor Airlines. Since rebranding, the airline now operates many scheduled and charter flights to and from Cambodia, including China, Japan, South Korea, and Vietnam.

On 23 April 2022, Sky Angkor Airlines announced daily flights from Phnom Penh to Bangkok and Siem Reap with Airbus A321-200 starting from 6 May 2022.

In September 2026, Sky Angkor Airlines wet-leased two Airbus A320 aircraft to Indian low-cost carrier SpiceJet.

== Destinations ==
Sky Angkor Airlines serves the following destinations:

Country	City	Airport	Notes	Refs
Cambodia	Phnom Penh	Techo International Airport	Base	
Cambodia	Siem Reap	Siem Reap International Airport	Airport Closed	
Cambodia	Siem Reap	Siem Reap–Angkor International Airport	Base	
China	Shanghai	Shanghai Pudong International Airport		
India	Gaya	Gaya Airport		
Macau	Macau	Macau International Airport		
South Korea	Seoul	Incheon International Airport		
Thailand	Bangkok	Don Mueang International Airport	Terminated	
Thailand	Bangkok	Suvarnabhumi Airport		

== Fleet ==
=== Current fleet ===
As of August 2025, Sky Angkor Airlines operates the following aircraft:

Sky Angkor Airlines fleet
Aircraft	In fleet	Orders	Passengers			Notes
Aircraft	In fleet	Orders	C	Y	Total	Notes
Airbus A320-200	4	—	—	180	180	
Airbus A320neo	1	—	—	180	180	
Total	5	—				

=== Former fleet ===
Sky Angkor Airlines, as well as Skywings Asia Airlines, previously operated the following aircraft:

Sky Angkor Airlines former fleet
Aircraft	Total	Retired
Airbus A321	1	
McDonnell Douglas MD-83	2	2014

== See also ==
- Air transport in Cambodia
- List of airlines of Cambodia
