= Stung Treng Bridge =

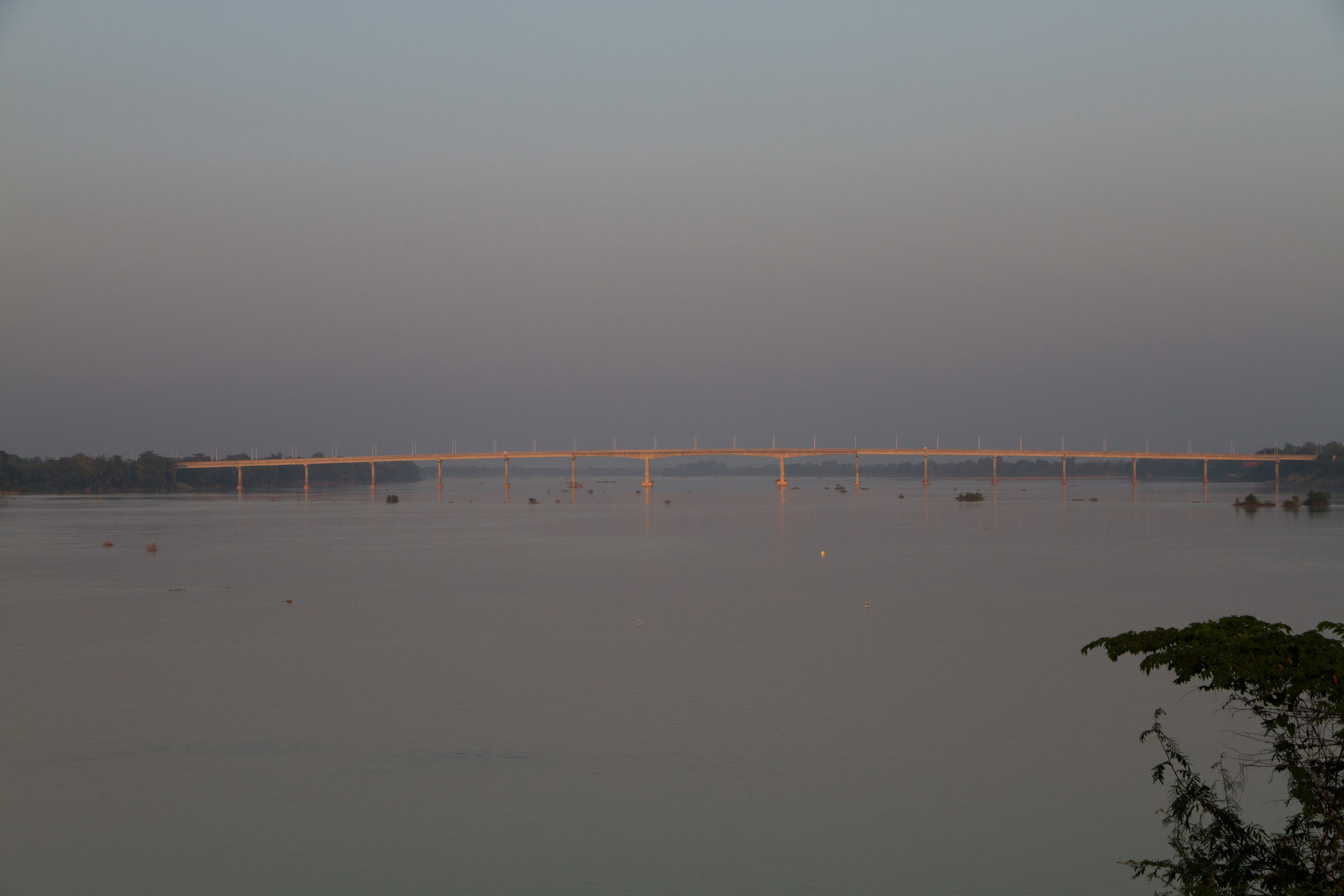
- Stung Treng Bridge
- Coordinates: 13°31′35″N 105°56′11″E
- Crosses: Mekong River
- Locale: Stung Treng, Cambodia
- Official name: Cambodia-China Friendship Bridge
- Other name: Mekong Bridge

Characteristics
- Total length: 1,731 m

History
- Opened: April 01, 2015

Location
- Interactive map of Stung Treng Bridge

The Stung Treng Bridge is a bridge on the Mekong River near the town of Stung Treng that was opened in 2015. Construction of the bridge was funded by the Chinese government.

The Stung Treng Bridge links Stung Treng province's rural parts and its provincial town as well as its neighboring Preah Vihear Province and the border of Laos.

== Construction ==
On May 5, 2012, construction for the 6th Cambodia-China Friendship, the Stung Treng Bridge, began. Construction of this bridge was undertaken by Shanghai Construction Group and Guangzhou Wanan Construction Supervision, Co. Ltd. The bridge cost a total of US$2,558,125, which is financed by the Chinese government, based on the CDC report. The concessional loan for the project is provided by Exim Bank of China.

== Inauguration ==
As of April 1, 2015, the construction for the Mekong-Stung Treng Bridge is completed, which is marked by an inauguration ceremony attended by Cambodian Prime Minister Hun Sen and Chinese Ambassador to Cambodia Bu Jianguo. The bridge serves to enable more travel and trade as well as improve people's living conditions by providing a cheaper and faster alternative to travel across the Mekong River.
