= Soutr Nikom District =

Soutr Nikom ស្រុកសូទ្រនិគម Soutr Nikum
- District (srok)
- District location in Siem Reap Province
- Coordinates: 13°13′56.03″N 104°7′46.27″E
- Country: Cambodia
- Province: Siem Reap
- Time zone: +7
- Geocode: 1711

Soutr Nikom District (Sout ~ / ~ Nikum; Khmer: ស្រុកសូទ្រនិគម) is a district of Siem Reap Province, in north western Cambodia. According to the 1998 census of Cambodia, it had a population of 90,080.

The district is home to the Siem Reap–Angkor International Airport.

== Administrative divisions ==
Soutr Nikom District has 10 communes and 113 villages.

Code Commune	Commune	Language Khmer	Village
១៧១១០១	Chan Sar	ឃុំចាន់ស	ជាំ, គោកតឺង, ស្រែប្រីយ៍, ត្រពាំងទូក, ជប់, តាតោកខាងកើត, កនែ្សងក្រោម, កនែ្សងលើ, តាតោកខាងលិច, តាតោកកណ្តាល, សន្លោង, ស្វាយស, ដូនដៀវ, ថ្នល់, បែកកាំភ្លើង, គោកចិន, ចាន់សខាងជើង, ចាន់សខាងត្បូង, ច្បារលើ
១៧១១០២	Dam Daek	ឃុំដំដែក	ដូនហុង, ដំដែកលើ, ត្របែក, ព្រះត្រពាំង, អូរលុះ, គោករលួស, ក្រសាទុំ, គោកមន, ដំដែកថ្មី, បន្ទាយស្រី, ស្រែធ្នង់, ដំដែកផ្សារ, បុស្ស
១៧១១០៣	Dan Run	ឃុំដានរុន	ថ្នល់ដាច់, ត្រាវគៀត, គោកប្ញស្សីត្បូង, គោកប្ញស្សីជើង, រុនខាងត្បូង, រុនខាងជើង, ស្រម៉ធំ, វាល, បន្ទាត់បោះ, សនៃ្ទ, ធ្នង់, គោកចាន់, បេង
១៧១១០៤	Kampong Khleang	ឃុំកំពង់ឃ្លាំង	ព្រែកស្រមោច, ស្ពានវែង, តាអួរស, ផ្សារឃ្លាំង, ចំការយួន, តាច្រនៀង, អូរតាពុត, ជ័យជេត, មុខវត្ត, រទាំង
១៧១១០៥	Kien Sangkae	ឃុំកៀនសង្កែ	កំពង់គ២, កំពង់គ១, សាលាកកោះ, គោកដី, ជ្រៃខាងជើង, ជ្រៃខាងត្បូង, ដូនឡី, ត្រពាំងព្រៃ, ថ្មី, ថ្នល់ដាច់កើត, ថ្នល់ចែក, ជីគាក
១៧១១០៦	Khchas	ឃុំខ្ចាស់	ថ្លាត, ថ្មី, ក្បូន, គោកសងែ្ក, ជ្រៃ, យាងទេស, ខ្ចាស់
១៧១១០៧	Khnar Pou	ឃុំខ្នារពោធិ៍	ឈូក, បុស្ស, បុស្សធំ, ដំរីឆ្លង, សំបាត, សំរោង, រំដេង, ជប់
១៧១១០៨	Popel	ឃុំពពេល	ព្រៃលាន, ត្រពាំងត្រាវ, គោល, ថ្នល់ត្រង់, ត្រពាំងត្រុំ, ត្រាចពក, ពពេលកណ្តាល, ពពេលលិច, កៀ្រលពង, ដំរីកូន, ត្រពាំងផុង, ត្រពាំងប្រីយ៍, គោលថ្មី
១៧១១០៩	Samraong	ឃុំសំរោង	សំរោងខាងជើង, ថ្នល់ចែក, បិទមាស, ស្ទឹង, អង្កញ់, បត់ដង្កោ, ស្វាយជ្រំ, ក្រាំងខ្ជាយ, សំរោងខាងត្បូង
១៧១១១០	Ta Yaek	ឃុំតាយ៉ែក	បឹងង៉ត, ដាក់ផ្កា, ត្រាវបាក់, ផ្ការំចេក, ចំប៊ី, ប៉ោយស្មាច់, បវ៉ាល, បឹងវៀន, តាយ៉ែក
