= Techo International Airport =

Airport serving Phnom Penh, Cambodia

Techo International Airport អាកាសយានដ្ឋានអន្តរជាតិតេជោ Akasayeanatthan Antaracheat Techou

- IATA: KTI; ICAO: VDTI

Summary
- Airport type: Public
- Owner: Cambodia Airport Investment Co., Ltd. (a subsidiary of Overseas Cambodian Investment Corporation)
- Operator: Cambodia Airports (a subsidiary of Vinci Airports)
- Serves: Phnom Penh metropolitan area
- Location: Kandal Stueng, Kandal, Cambodia
- Opened: Operational: 9 September 2025; 14 months ago; Official: 20 October 2025; 13 months ago
- Hub for: Air Cambodia; Cambodia Airways; Sky Angkor Airlines
- Focus city for: Vietnam Airlines
- Operating base for: AirAsia Cambodia
- Coordinates: 11°21′46.5″N 104°54′59.8″E
- Website: www.techoairport.com.kh

Map
- Location in Cambodia

Runways
Direction	Length		Surface
Direction	m	ft	Surface
05/23	4,000	13,123	Concrete

Statistics (September to December 2025)
- Passenger movements: 1,673,000 ▲--
- Aircraft movements: 14,854 ▲--
- Source: Vinci Airports

Techo International Airport (IATA: KTI, ICAO: VDTI) is an international airport in Kandal Stueng District, Kandal Province of Cambodia. Located 19 kilometres (12 mi) south of Phnom Penh, the first phase was operational on 9 September 2025, and replaced the existing Phnom Penh International Airport as the city's main aviation hub. It spans over 2,600 hectares (6,400 acres) in Kandal Province, making it Cambodia's largest airport, and is designated as a 4F class airport. An official inauguration ceremony was held on 20 October 2025, with Prime Minister Hun Manet presiding over the grand opening ceremony. The airport acts as the hub for Air Cambodia, Cambodia Airways and Sky Angkor Airlines.

== Etymology ==
The name Techo (Khmer: តេជោ) is a title given to army commanders by the King of Cambodia. Then Prime Minister Hun Sen announced the new name on 9 December 2021 while inspecting the new airport. The word "Techo" is referenced from Khmer history in which the king granted titles to former Khmer army commanders Techo Meas and Techo Yort who operated in the territory of Kandal Province. He also stated that "Techo" shows the strength of the Kingdom's monarchy.

== Location and connections ==
Techo International Airport is located in the south of Kandal province, over 30 kilometres (19 mi) south of Phnom Penh, near the border of Takeo province, in front of Boeng Cheung Loung lake and surrounded by rice fields. A highway was constructed to connect the airport to the southern part of Hun Sen boulevard. The highway merges into National Highway 2.

The airport is served by an airport express bus service managed by the Phnom Penh City Bus Authority that runs daily between 5.30 a.m. to 11.30 p.m.

In July 2023, Sun Chanthol of the Ministry of Public Works and Transport expressed the government's interest in connecting the airport with Phnom Penh city, possibly near the AEON mall in Mean Chey, via light rail, potentially as part of an underground metro system.

== History ==
A new airport for Phnom Penh was first hinted in 2016 once further expansion plans for the existing Phnom Penh airport ended. The project was then officially announced in January 2018, with construction beginning in 2019.

The project is being invested by Cambodia Airport Investment Co., Ltd. (CAIC), a joint venture between Overseas Cambodian Investment Corporation (OCIC), holding 90%, and the State Secretariat of Civil Aviation (SSCA), holding 10%.

The airport is being constructed on a 2,600-hectare site spanning Kandal and Takeo provinces. Then–Prime Minister Hun Sen announced the name for the airport on 9 December 2021 whilst inspecting the new airport.

=== Financing ===
The project was estimated to cost around $1.5 billion, with part of the funding ($1.1 billion) expected to be loaned by the China Development Bank. In 2021, the China Development Bank withdrew from the agreement, which led the developer Cambodia Airport Investment Co., Ltd (CAIC) to issue airport bonds in November 2021. The bonds, mostly subscribed by local companies and financial institutions, raised $300 million, which was then invested by Overseas Cambodian Investment Corporation (OCIC). OCIC disclosed that all the $500 million budget originates entirely from Cambodia.

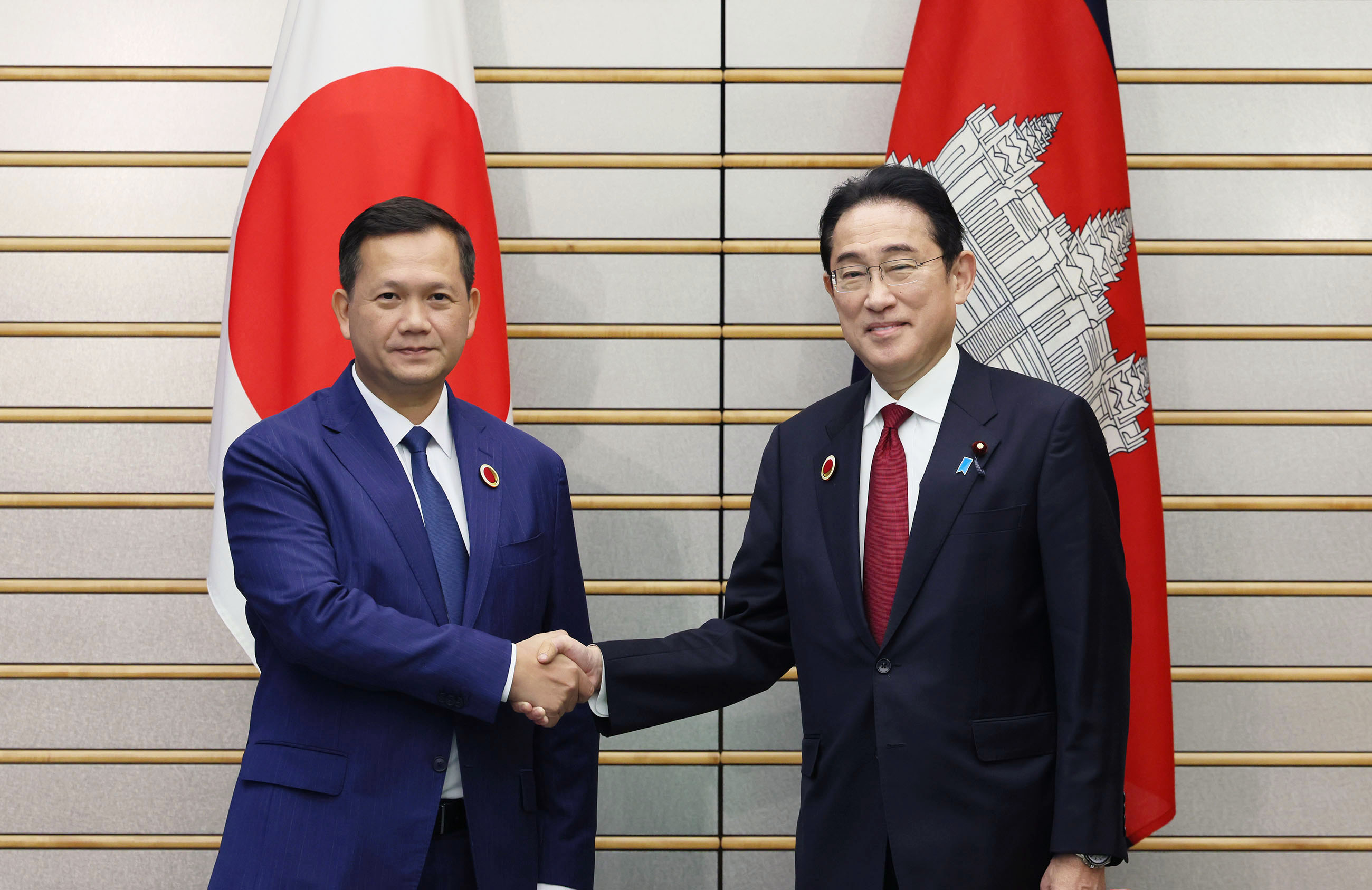
Hun Manet and his Japanese counterpart Fumio Kishida in 2023. According to The Phnom Penh Post, Hun's visit helped attract Japanese investment attention to Cambodia

In December 2023, about 22 Japanese companies began considering investment into the project, with firm representatives visiting the airport on 20 December. This followed a recent visit by Prime Minister Hun Manet to Japan, which according to The Phnom Penh Post helped attract interest in investing into Cambodia.

=== Construction ===
Construction was undertaken by Cambodian, European, North American, Chinese, and South Korean companies; with Mega Cambo Construction Company (MCCC) - a subsidiary of OCIC - building the air traffic control tower and ancillary buildings; Arup Group working on site formation and dyke; China Construction Third Engineering Bureau Group Co., Ltd building the passenger building; LBL International Construction for terminal soffit and cladding; and Shanghai Baoye Group - a subsidiary of Metallurgical Corporation of China - constructing the runways, taxiways, aprons, and related facilities.

On 30 June 2023, the State Secretariat of Civil Aviation (SSCA) announced that more than half of construction on phase 1 was completed. By the end of November 2023, the SSCA announced phase 1 to be 55% completed. By January 2024, the Phase 1 passenger terminal was 47.4% completed, the power supply centre was 73.7%, parking lots was 52.2%, and the traffic control tower was at 90.8% completed.

The first phase was initially expected to be completed by mid-2024, with the airport being built in 3 stages. The opening was pushed to 2025, initially for 10 July. This was again moved to 9 September, with the first arrival being an Air Cambodia flight from China. The airport was officially inaugurated on 20 October in a ceremony led by Prime Minister Hun Manet.

==== Tensions with locals during constructions ====
On 8 June 2023, local residents from four communes in Kandal province around the airport protested against the filling of land near their homes and Canal 94. Chiv Kok Say, who is in-charge with land acquisitions, said the homes they were filling in were vacant after their owners were paid $2,000. Chiv also said that the developments there was to prevent future flooding of the airport. To prevent the residents from intervening, the company brought in security and fire trucks, which they used to spray water at the villagers who were armed with sticks and stones. Similarly, there were tensions between OCIC and farmers in Bati district over canals dug by the OCIC in August 2021. Local protests against the canal construction at the time was blocked by district and provincial police.

Since construction on the airport began, the OCIC began buying out land from local farmers. However, this was at a low rate of $1 per square meter, lower than the $5 and later $3 rates proposed by some local farmers and not adequate enough for some farmers to relocate to new farmland. The village chiefs and around 100 families in Champei and Doung communes in Bati district who have been farming on the land since 1979, then asked for Hun Manet to help mediate and increase the rate to $3. Their land is planned to be turned into a reservoir according to Chiv Kok Say, who also said that their request of a $3 rate was not feasible because their "farmlands were without title deeds". More than 400 families in Kandal Stueng and Bati districts were displaced by the airport's development.

According to NGO Sahmakum Teang Tnaut, a local NGO founded in 2006 to support urban poor communities, around 2,000 households faced eviction as a result of the airport's construction.

== Design ==
Departure hall

Transit area

The airport's design was carried out by the renowned British architecture firm, Foster and Partners. The terminals have been designed to use natural light and have lush greenery. The terminals will also almost entirely be powered by an onsite solar farm. Once fully completed, the terminal building will comprise a central head house with two aerofoil shaped piers either side that optimize walking distances.

For the Cambodian government, the inclusion of greenery is part of the GreenSky project, which aims to make Techo a sustainable and eco-friendly airport. GreenSky aims to do this through the use of vertical gardens, rooftop greenery, and the use of native Cambodian flora, which will improve the airport's air quality. The project also aims to establish a botanical garden within the airport. Alongside the use of flora, the airport management also plans to use eco-friendly practices such as the use of solar energy, rainwater harvesting, and measures to reduce waste.

== Operations ==
Techo International Airport replaced all of Phnom Penh International Airport's commercial operations and international flights, while the older airport will be used as a military airbase, for domestic flights and private jets. The first phase can handle 13 million passengers a year, whilst the second phase is set to increase this to 30 million. All together, the three phases will be able to handle 50 million passengers a year. The airport will be able to handle large passenger aircraft such as the Airbus A380 and Boeing 747-8.

The airport's developer CAIC has appointed partners including Vinci Airports, Lagardère Travel Retail, and Newrest Group to oversee airport management, retail, and catering.

The airport MRO center (Maintenance, Repair and Overhaul) is provided by TIA Engineering Services Company Limited, a joint-venture between SIA Engineering Company and Cambodia Airport Investment Co. Ltd.

On 15 August 2025, an A320 plane from Air Cambodia became the first commercial plane to successfully test a touch-and-go landing at the new airport. On 4 September 2025, another Air Cambodia A320 (XU-356) became the first commercial plane ferrying passengers to test landing at the new airport; the flight, which originated from Ho Chi Minh City, landed at the airport at 10:30 am local time (UTC+07:00).

Techo International Airport (KTI) officially commenced commercial operations on 9 September 2025. On the same day, Air Cambodia K6611 became the first plane to land at the airport, successfully touching down at 8:00 AM local time (UTC+7) after its 2-hour and 30-minute journey from Guangzhou Baiyun International Airport (CAN). The flight was given a water salute upon arrival and its passengers were warmly greeted by high-ranking Cambodian officials, including Mao Havannall, Minister in Charge of Cambodia's State Secretariat of Civil Aviation (SSCA), and the governors of Phnom Penh, Kandal, and Takeo, as well as Pung Kheav Se, Chairman of OCIC and Cambodia Airport Investment Co. (CAIC). Nearly three hours later, Techo International Airport hosted its first foreign VIP: Philippine President Bongbong Marcos, who departed Phnom Penh on a chartered Philippine Airlines flight after a three-day state visit. He had originally been set to leave via the old Phnom Penh International Airport, but Senate President Hun Sen arranged his departure from the newly built facility following their meeting earlier that morning.

== Airlines and destinations ==
=== Passenger ===
The airport is served by the following airports:

Airlines	Destinations
Air Cambodia	Bangkok–Suvarnabhumi, Da Nang, Delhi, Fuzhou, Guangzhou, Hong Kong, Koh Kong, Nanning, Nha Trang, Phu Quoc, Shenzhen, Siem Reap, Tokyo–Narita, Zhengzhou
Air China	Beijing–Capital
AirAsia Cambodia	Hanoi, Ho Chi Minh City, Kuala Lumpur–International, Siem Reap
Asiana Airlines	Seoul–Incheon
Bangkok Airways	Bangkok–Suvarnabhumi
Cambodia Airways	Bangkok–Suvarnabhumi, Changsha, Chengdu–Tianfu, Da Nang, Guangzhou, Hong Kong, Koh Kong, Kuala Lumpur–International, Penang, Sanya, Shenzhen, Siem Reap, Singapore, Vientiane, Yangon
Cathay Pacific	Hong Kong
China Airlines	Taipei–Taoyuan
China Eastern Airlines	Kunming, Shanghai–Pudong, Wuhan
China Southern Airlines	Guangzhou
Emirates	Dubai–International, Singapore
Etihad Airways	Abu Dhabi
EVA Air	Taipei–Taoyuan
Hainan Airlines	Haikou (Begins 12 December 2026)
Indonesia AirAsia	Jakarta–Soekarno-Hatta
Korean Air	Seoul–Incheon
Malaysia Airlines	Kuala Lumpur–International
Myanmar Airways International	Yangon
PAL Express	Manila
Qatar Airways	Doha, Ho Chi Minh City
Shenzhen Airlines	Shenzhen
Singapore Airlines	Singapore
Sky Angkor Airlines	Bangkok–Suvarnabhumi, Changsha, Chengdu–Tianfu; Seasonal: Gaya
Spring Airlines	Chengdu–Tianfu, Guangzhou, Shanghai–Pudong, Shenzhen, Xi'an
Thai AirAsia	Bangkok–Don Mueang
Thai Airways International	Bangkok–Suvarnabhumi
Thai VietJet Air	Bangkok–Suvarnabhumi
Turkish Airlines	Bangkok–Suvarnabhumi, Istanbul
Vietnam Airlines	Hanoi, Ho Chi Minh City, Vientiane
XiamenAir	Chongqing, Fuzhou, Qingdao, Xiamen

=== Cargo ===
Airlines	Destinations
Atlas Air	Baku, Zaragoza,
Cathay Cargo	Hong Kong, Penang, Singapore
Emirates SkyCargo	Dubai–Al Maktoum
K-Mile Air	Bangkok–Suvarnabhumi
Pattaya Airways	Bangkok–Suvarnabhumi
Qatar Airways Cargo	Bangkok–Suvarnabhumi, Doha

== Statistics ==
Statistics for Techo International Airport
Year	Total passengers	Change from previous year	Total aircraft movements	Change from previous year
2025	1,673,000	▲--	14,854	▲--

== See also ==
- List of airports in Cambodia
- List of airlines of Cambodia
