= Kandal Stueng District =

Kandal Stueng កណ្តាលស្ទឹង
- District
- Location within Cambodia
- Coordinates: 11°24′24″N 104°50′8″E
- Country: Cambodia
- Province: Kandal

Population (1998)
  - Total: 76,549
- Time zone: UTC+07:00 (ICT)
- Geocode: 0801

Kandal Stueng (Khmer: កណ្តាលស្ទឹង [kɑnɗaːl stɨŋ]) is a district (srok) of Kandal Province, Cambodia. The district is subdivided into 23 communes (khums) and 154 villages (phums). The district is home to Techo International Airport.
