= Stung Treng Airport =

Airport in Stung Treng, Cambodia

Stung Treng Airport អាកាសយានដ្ឋានស្ទឹងត្រែង
- IATA: TNX; ICAO: VDST

Summary
- Airport type: Public, Domestic
- Serves: Stung Treng, Cambodia
- Elevation AMSL: 62 m (203 ft)
- Coordinates: 13°31′54″N 106°00′52″E

Map
- Location of airport in Cambodia

Runways
Direction	Length		Surface
Direction	m	ft	Surface
02/20	1,295	4,248	Asphalt

Statistics (?)
- Passenger movements: ?
- Airfreight movements in tonnes: ?
- Aircraft movements: ?
- Source: DAFIF

Stung Treng Airport (IATA: TNX, ICAO: VDST) is an airport serving Stung Treng, the capital of Stung Treng Province in Cambodia. The airport was closed in 2003, but there's a helipad that is still in use today.

== Facilities ==
The airport resides at an elevation of 200 feet (61 m) above mean sea level. It has one runway designated 02/20 with an asphalt surface measuring 1,300 by 20 metres (4,265 ft × 66 ft).
