= AirAsia Cambodia =

Low-cost airline of Cambodia

AirAsia Cambodia អ៊ែរ អេស៊ា ខេមបូឌា

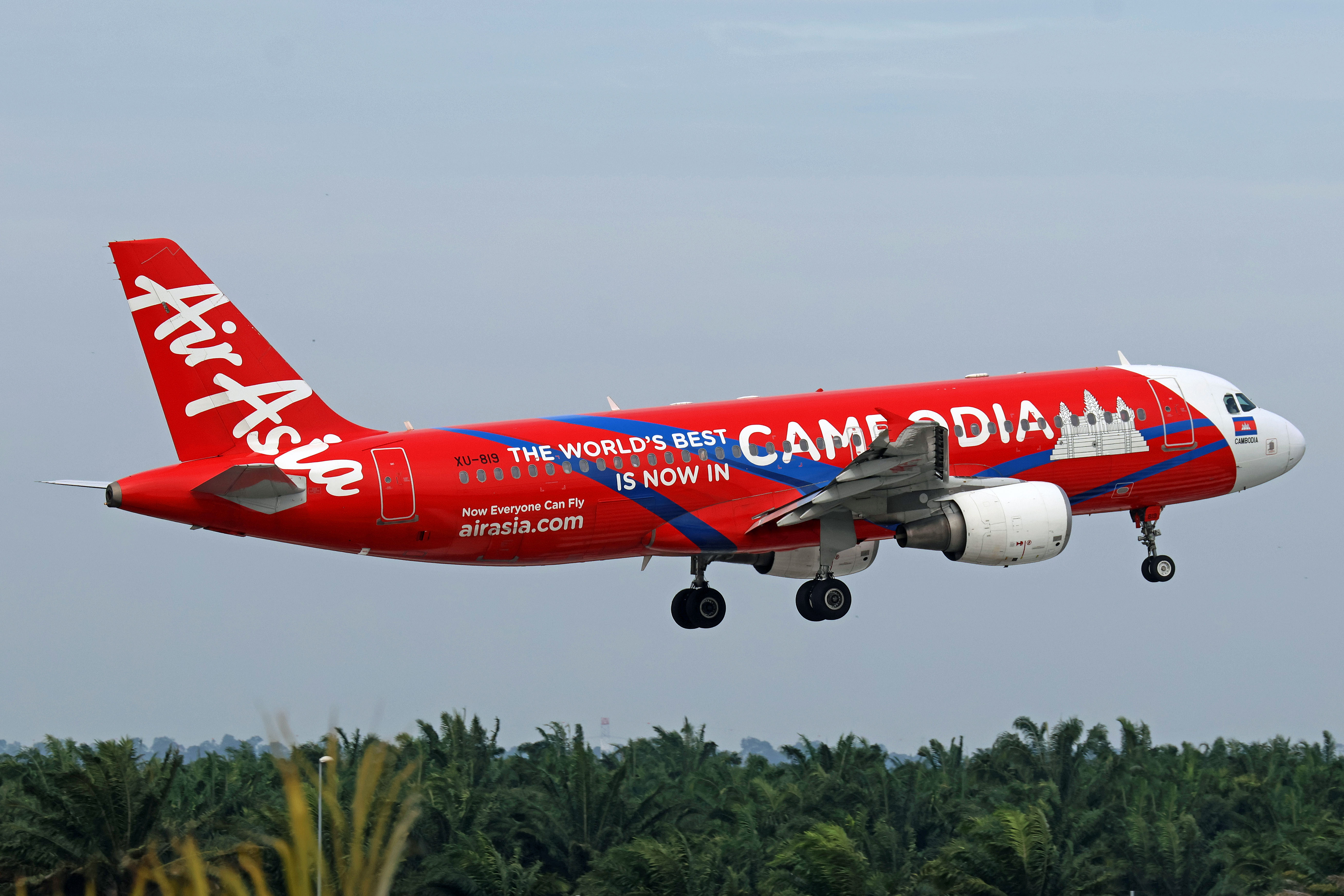
- AirAsia Cambodia Airbus A320
IATA	ICAO	Call sign
KT	KTC	RED NAGA
- Founded: 9 December 2022; 3 years ago
- Commenced operations: 2 May 2024; 2 years ago
- Operating bases: Techo International Airport
- Frequent-flyer program: BIG Loyalty Programme
- Fleet size: 2
- Destinations: 5
- Parent company: AirAsia
- Headquarters: Phnom Penh, Cambodia
- Website: www.airasia.com

AirAsia Cambodia (Khmer: អ៊ែរ អេស៊ា ខេមបូឌា) is a Cambodian low-cost airline based at Techo International Airport. It is a joint venture between the Malaysian AirAsia and Cambodian local enterprise Sivilai Asia. The airline was launched on 9 December 2022 and started operations on 2 May 2024. Cambodia is the fifth country in Southeast Asia in which Capital A established the AirAsia brand.

== History ==
In May 2017, AirAsia planned to open a subsidiary company in Cambodia to handle an increase of tourists from Malaysia visiting to the Cambodian cities of Phnom Penh, Siem Reap and Sihanoukville. In November 2019, after a short hiatus, AirAsia resumed its plans to establish a Cambodian subsidiary, which was supported by the State Secretariat of Civil Aviation in January 2020.

On 9 December 2022, AirAsia and Sivilai Asia signed a joint venture agreement to establish AirAsia Cambodia. Capital A, the holding company of the AirAsia Group, would own 51% of the airline, while hospitality group Sivilai Asia would own the remaining share. Subject to regulatory approvals, on 18 March 2024, the airline was launched. On 2 May 2024, the airline started operations.

== Destinations ==
The airline plans to operate flights within a four-hour radius from its Cambodian bases. It would also focus on connecting ASEAN countries, as well as India, China, and North Asia.

Country	City	Airport	Notes	Refs
Cambodia	Phnom Penh	Phnom Penh International Airport	Airport Closed	
Cambodia	Phnom Penh	Techo International Airport	Base	
Cambodia	Siem Reap	Siem Reap–Angkor International Airport		
Cambodia	Sihanoukville	Sihanouk International Airport	Terminated	
Malaysia	Kuala Lumpur	Kuala Lumpur International Airport		
Singapore	Singapore	Changi Airport	Terminated	
Vietnam	Hanoi	Noi Bai International Airport		
Vietnam	Ho Chi Minh City	Tan Son Nhat International Airport		
Vietnam	Phu Quoc	Phu Quoc International Airport		

== Fleet ==
As of August 2025, AirAsia Cambodia operates the following aircraft:

Aircraft	In service	Orders	Passengers
Airbus A320-200	2	—	180
Total	2	—	
