= Krakor Airport =

- IATA: KZD; ICAO: VDSY

Summary
- Airport type: Public
- Serves: Krakor
- Location: Cambodia
- Elevation AMSL: 16 ft / 5 m
- Coordinates: 12°32′22.1″N 104°8′54.5″E

Map
- Location of Krakor Airport in Cambodia

Runways
Direction	Length		Surface
Direction	ft	m	Surface
18/36	4,800	1,463	Gravel
- Source: Landings.com

Krakor Airport (IATA: KZD, ICAO: VDSY) is a public use airport located near Krakor, Poŭthĭsăt, Cambodia.

== See also ==
- List of airports in Cambodia
