= Khudozai railway station =

Railway station in Pakistan

Coordinates: 32°54′N 71°27′E

General information
- Owner: Ministry of Railways

Other information
- Station code: KZD

History
- Former names: Great Indian Peninsula Railway
Location

Khudozai railway station (Urdu: خدوزائی ریلوے اسٹیشن) is located in Pakistan.

== See also ==
- List of railway stations in Pakistan
- Pakistan Railways
