= Siem Reap–Angkor International Airport =

Airport in Cambodia

Siem Reap Angkor International Airport អាកាសយានដ្ឋានអន្តរជាតិសៀមរាបអង្គរ Akasayeanatthan Antaracheat Siem Reap Angkor
- IATA: SAI; ICAO: VDSA

Summary
- Airport type: Public
- Operator: Yunnan Aviation Industry Investment Group
- Serves: Siem Reap
- Location: Sotr Nikum, Siem Reap, Cambodia
- Opened: 16 October 2023; 3 years ago
- Hub for: Air Cambodia
- Focus city for: Vietnam Airlines
- Operating base for: AirAsia Cambodia; Sky Angkor Airlines
- Coordinates: 13°22′31″N 104°13′15″E
- Website: english.sai-airport.com
- Interactive map of Siem Reap Angkor International Airport

Runways
Direction	Length		Surface
Direction	m	ft	Surface
05/23	3,605	11,827	Concrete

Siem Reap–Angkor International Airport (IATA: SAI, ICAO: VDSA) is an international airport in Soutr Nikom District, Siem Reap province serving the city of Siem Reap, Cambodia. It is 18 km (11 mi) northeast of Damdek, 40 km (25 mi) east of Angkor Wat and 50 km (31 mi) east of Siem Reap. It is the second largest airport in Cambodia after the Phnom Penh Techo International Airport. SAI covers an area of 700 hectares (1,730 acres) of land and has a 3,600 m runway. The airport can handle 65,800 flights and 7 million passengers annually, projected to increase to 112,700 flights and 12 million passengers annually from 2040.

== History ==
The airport was built to replace Siem Reap International Airport, which proved unable to handle increased traffic and caused damage to Angkor Wat due to pollution. The project was introduced in 2010, and a Chinese company, Yunnan Investment Holdings Limited, was selected to build the airport in December 2016. The airport was constructed under a 55-year build–operate–transfer agreement.

Construction started in July 2018, and was delayed due to the COVID-19 pandemic and a labor shortage. The airport opened on 16 October 2023.

== Features ==
Jet bridge

The airport cost US$1.1 billion and occupies an area of 700 hectares (1,700 acres). The airport has a passenger terminal with 15 jet bridges, a cargo terminal, an air traffic control tower, and a 3,605-metre-long (11,827 ft) runway with a parallel taxiway. The terminal can handle 7 million passengers per year in the first phase.

Passenger terminal

The airport's runway is capable of handling narrow-body aircraft like the Boeing 737 and Airbus A320, and wide-body aircraft like the Boeing 747, Boeing 777, Boeing 787, Airbus A330, and Airbus A350, and future expansion will increase the airport's capacity to 12 million passengers per year by 2030. The third phase, planned for completion by 2050, will increase the total capacity to over 20 million passengers per year. The airport is planned to be connected with an airport expressway directly from the city.

Ground transportation services are provided by minibuses with up to 15 seats.

== Airlines and destinations ==
=== Passenger ===
Airlines	Destinations
AirAsia Cambodia	Kuala Lumpur; Seasonal: Phu Quoc
Air Cambodia	Da Nang, Ho Chi Minh City, Phnom Penh, Shenzhen, Sihanoukville
Bangkok Airways	Bangkok–Suvarnabhumi
Cambodia Airways	Bangkok–Suvarnabhumi, Guangzhou, Phnom Penh, Sihanoukville
China Eastern Airlines	Kunming
Emirates	Bangkok–Suvarnabhumi, Dubai-International
IndiGo	Kolkata
Lao Airlines	Seasonal: Luang Prabang, Pakse
Singapore Airlines	Singapore
Thai AirAsia	Bangkok–Don Mueang; Seasonal: Phuket
Thai Airways International	Seasonal: Bangkok Suvarnabhumi
Trinity Airways	Seasonal charter: Seoul–Incheon (begins 24 December 2026)
VietJet Air	Hanoi
Vietnam Airlines	Hanoi, Ho Chi Minh City; Seasonal: Luang Prabang

== See also ==
- List of airports in Cambodia
