= Ministry of Public Works and Transport (Cambodia) =

Government ministry of Cambodia

- ក្រសួងសាធារណការ និងដឹកជញ្ជូន

Agency overview
- Formed: 24 January 1996
- Jurisdiction: Royal Government of Cambodia
- Headquarters: Chea Sophara St. (598), Phnom Penh
- Annual budget: $735.7 million (2019)
- Minister responsible: Peng Pouthinea, Minister of Public Works and Transport
- Website: mpwt.gov.kh

The Ministry of Public Works and Transport (Khmer: ក្រសួងសាធារណការ និងដឹកជញ្ជូន) is the government ministry responsible for public works and transport in Cambodia. The Ministry is mandated to "build, maintain and manage all the transportation infrastructure such as roads, bridges, ports, railways, waterways and buildings" in the nation. Ministry offices are located in Phnom Penh.

== Organization ==
Organization structure
General Department of Administration and Finance	Department of Administration
General Department of Administration and Finance	Department of Personal Affairs
General Department of Administration and Finance	Department of Finance
General Department of Administration and Finance	Department of International Cooperation
General Department of Administration and Finance	Department of Legal Affairs
General Department of Planning and Policy	Department of Planning
General Department of Planning and Policy	Department of Information System Management
General Department of Planning and Policy	Department of Policy
General Department of Planning and Policy	Department of Monitoring and Evaluation
General Department of Techniques	Department of Road Infrastructure
General Department of Techniques	Department of Public Infrastructure
General Department of Techniques	Department of Techniques
General Department of Techniques	National Institute of Technical Training
General Department of Public Works	Department of Expressway, Bridge, and Investment
General Department of Public Works	Department of Sewage System and Engineering
General Department of Public Works	Department of Equipment and Road Construction
General Department of Public Works	Department of Repair and Maintenance
General Department of Land Transport	Department of Land Transport
General Department of Land Transport	Department of Road Safety
General Department of Land Transport	Department of Urban Public Transport
General Department of Waterway and Maritime Transport, and Ports	Department of Waterway Transport
General Department of Waterway and Maritime Transport, and Ports	Department of Maritime Transport
General Department of Waterway and Maritime Transport, and Ports	Department of Port Administration
General Department of Waterway and Maritime Transport, and Ports	Department of Waterway Infrastructure and Port Construction
General Department of Logistics	Department of Logistic Information
General Department of Logistics	Department of Logistics
General Department of Logistics	Department of Logistics Cooperation
General Department of Logistics	Department of Survey Reports
General Inspectorate	Department of IT and Public Relations
General Inspectorate	Financial Monitoring Union
General Inspectorate	Department of Internal Audit
General Inspectorate	Department of Railway
General Inspectorate	Procurement Union
Port Authority	Sihanoukville Autonomous Port
Port Authority	Phnom Penh Autonomous Port
Other agencies	Techo Sen Institute of Public Works and Transport
Other agencies	Municipal and Provincial Department of Public Works and Transport
Other agencies	Kampuchea Shipping Agency and Brokers (KAMSAB)
Other agencies	Laboratory of Construction and Public Works
