= Stung Treng =

Stung Treng ស្ទឹងត្រែង
- City
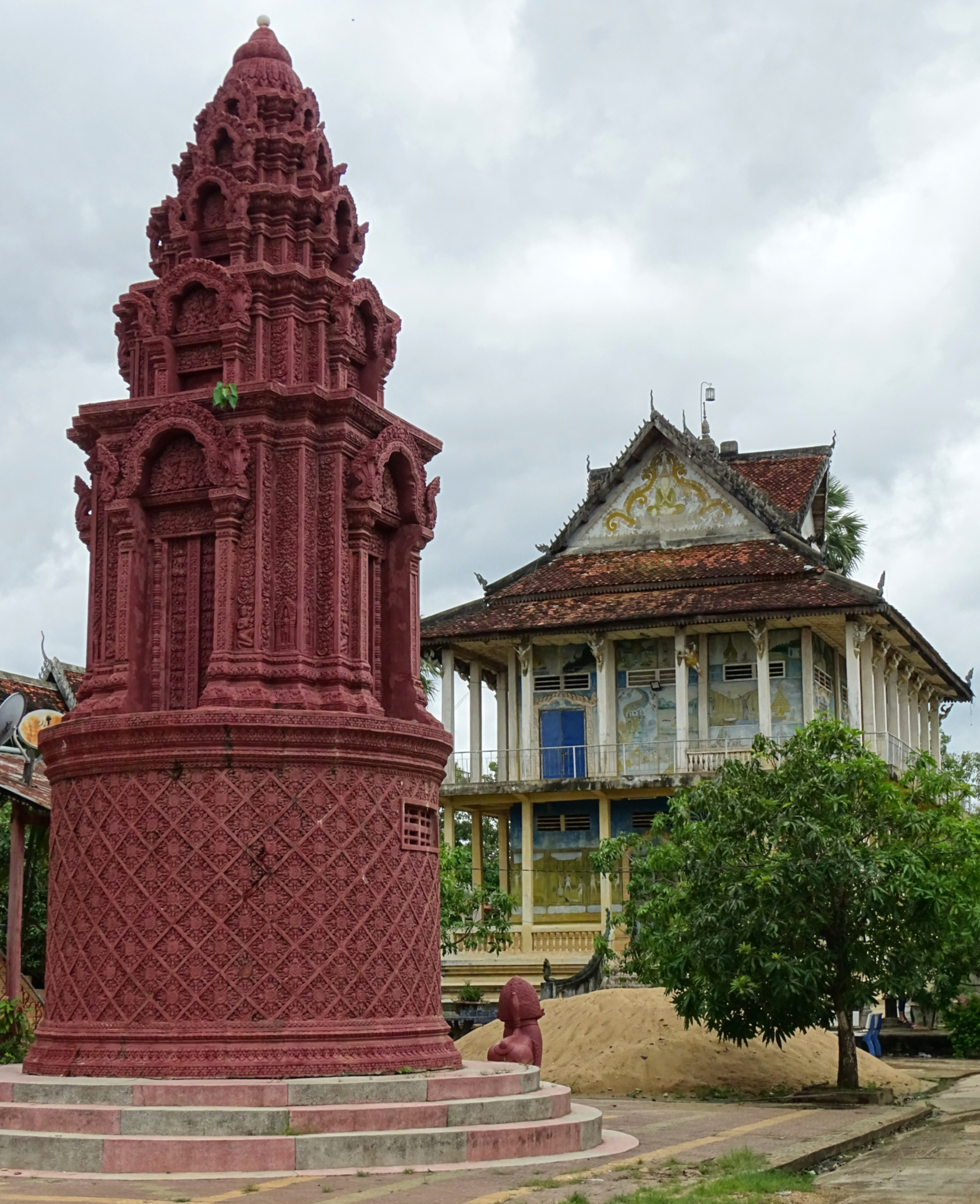

- Location within Cambodia
- Coordinates: 13°31′N 105°58′E
- Country: Cambodia
- Province: Stung Treng Province

Government
  - Type: Town

Population (2009)
  - Total: 29,665

Stung Treng (or Stung Treng City; Khmer: ទីក្រុងស្ទឹងត្រែង, "reed river"; pronounced [stɨŋ traeŋ], Lao: ຊຽງແຕງ) is the capital of Stung Treng Province, Cambodia. It is the major city (and capital) of both the district and province.

== Name ==
The name Stung Treng literally means "reed river". Stung means "river" and is a very common place name element in Cambodia.

== Geography ==
Stung Treng is located on the Sesan River near its confluence with the Mekong River. It's 376 km from Phnom Penh and it's 50 km south of the Laos border.

=== Climate ===
Climate data for Stung Treng (1982–2024)
Month	Jan	Feb	Mar	Apr	May	Jun	Jul	Aug	Sep	Oct	Nov	Dec	Year
Mean daily maximum °C (°F)	32.1 (89.8)	33.4 (92.1)	35.5 (95.9)	34.4 (93.9)	32.2 (90.0)	31.9 (89.4)	31.5 (88.7)	31.4 (88.5)	31.6 (88.9)	31.8 (89.2)	31.5 (88.7)	31.9 (89.4)	32.4 (90.4)
Mean daily minimum °C (°F)	20.8 (69.4)	21.2 (70.2)	23.6 (74.5)	23.9 (75.0)	24.0 (75.2)	23.7 (74.7)	23.9 (75.0)	23.5 (74.3)	22.7 (72.9)	21.9 (71.4)	21.6 (70.9)	21.0 (69.8)	22.6 (72.8)
Average precipitation mm (inches)	2.0 (0.08)	15.2 (0.60)	43.7 (1.72)	131.6 (5.18)	228.8 (9.01)	224.3 (8.83)	300.3 (11.82)	330.1 (13.00)	333.3 (13.12)	220.2 (8.67)	75.1 (2.96)	20.2 (0.80)	1,924.8 (75.79)
Source: World Meteorological Organization

== Transportation ==
The river port of the city park is fairly busy, handling trade between Cambodia and Laos and transporting people. The city also lies along the National Highway 7. It has two main bridges, the Stung Treng Bridge on the Mekong and the Sekong Bridge on the Sekong river. The city is served by Stung Treng Airport, but currently, there are no regular commercial services.

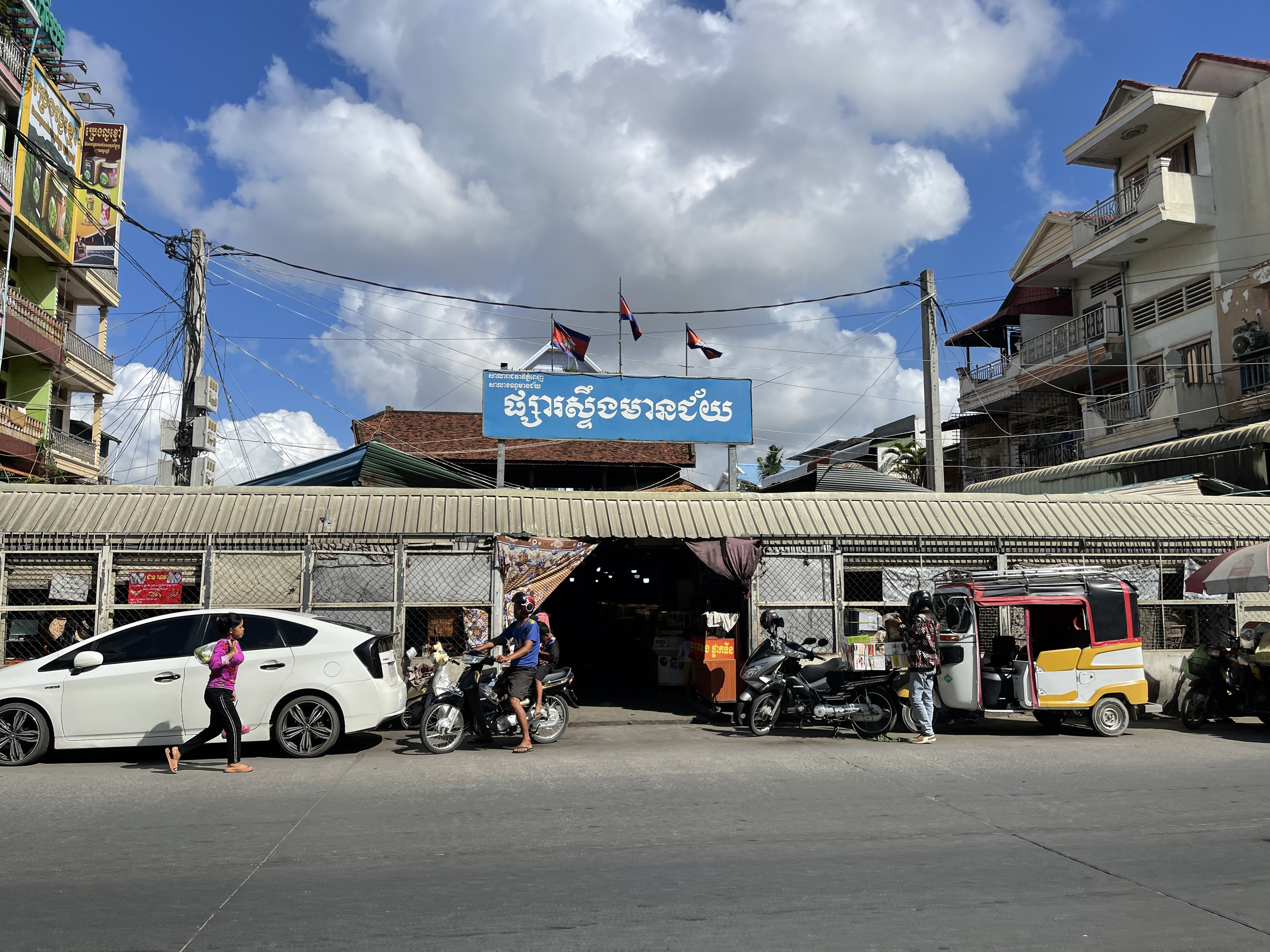
A market in the city

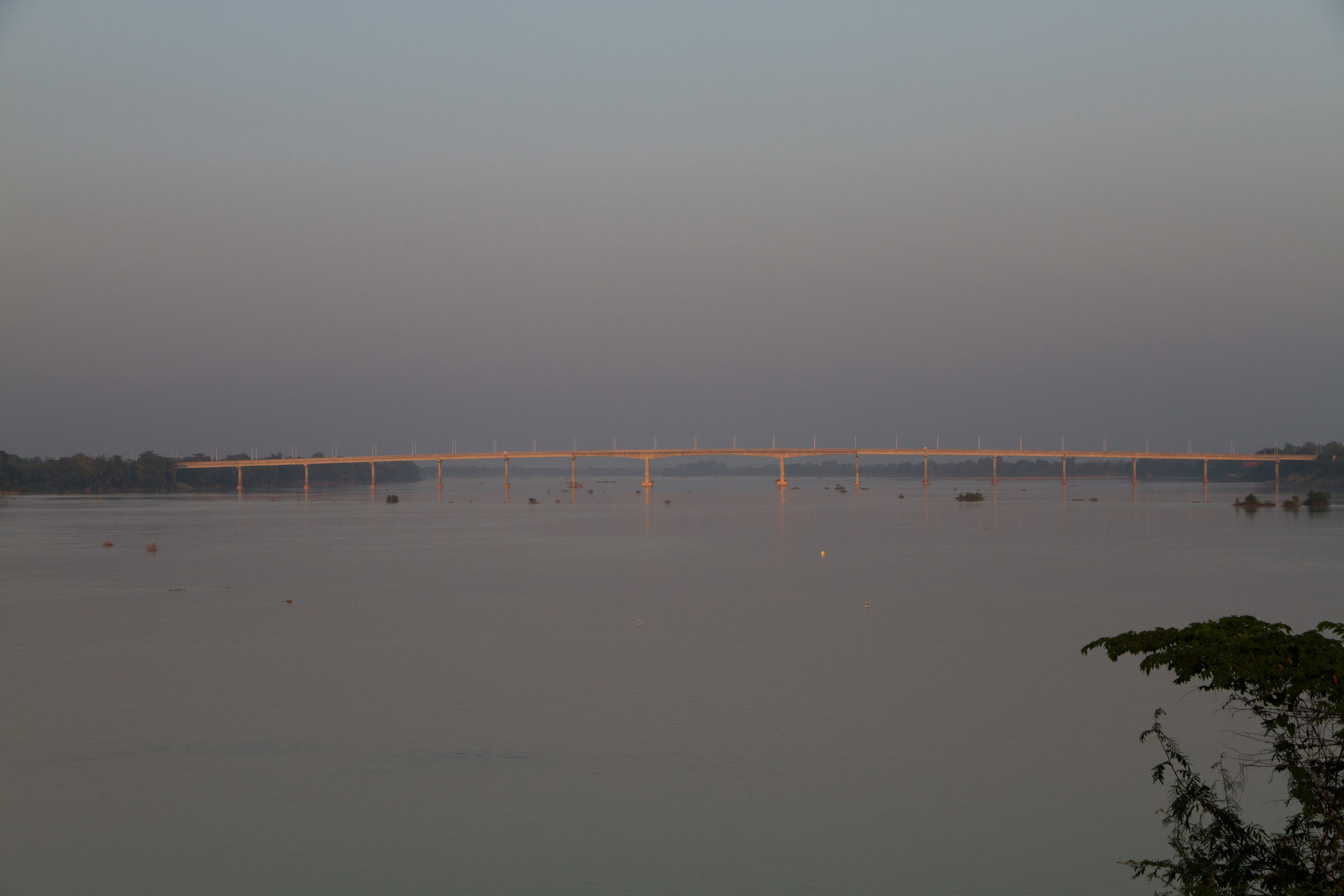
The Stung Treng bridge
