= State Secretariat of Civil Aviation =

The State Secretariat of Civil Aviation (SSCA, Khmer: រដ្ឋលេខាធិការដ្ឋានអាកាសចរស៊ីវិល, រលអស) is an agency of the government of Cambodia in-charge of civil aviation including airports in the country. It is headquartered in the capital Phnom Penh. The SSCA oversees the operation of national airports and air traffic management system in Cambodia. In 2000, it granted lease to SAMART Corporation to operate and upgrade the country's air traffic control and air navigation system under a long-term concession. The Secretary of State in charge is Mao Havannall.

== History ==
In 1954, the newly independent nation decided temporarily to use the French Civil Aviation Code in Cambodia. France has been its colonial master for many decades. Then on January 24, 1955, the Civil Aviation Bureau (CAB) was created under Ministry of Public Works and Telecommunication.

On January 16, 1956, Cambodia signed the Chicago Convention and formally became a member of the international civil aviation community. On the same year, the Royal Air Cambodge (RAC), the country's national airline, was established in partnership with Air France with the Cambodian Government owning 60% and Air France with the remaining 40%.

By March 13, 1963, the Airport Command (Administration) and Airport Operation and Management were formed. During the Khmer Rouge regime, civil aviation operations were interrupted and only resumed in 1981. The following year, a new national airline - Kampuchea Airlines, was formed only to be renamed again as Royal Air Cambodge later. The air traffic control had been overseen by Bangkok Area of Responsibility (AOR) since 1972.

Between 1990 and 1992, the Department of Civil Aviation was renamed into General Direction of Civil Aviation (GDCA). By 1992, control of DGCA was passed from the Ministry of Defense to the Council of Ministers. In 1993, the Department of DGCA changed its name to Civil Aviation Authority of the Kingdom of Cambodia (CAAKC). On January 24, 1996, CAAKC again changed its name to the present title of the State Secretariat of Civil Aviation (SSCA) by The Royal Decree SH RDC 0196, on the formation of State Secretariat of Civil aviation (SSCA) dated 24 Jan 1996.

In 2004, the Area of Responsibility (AOR) was transferred and integrated from Bangkok AOR to Phnom Penh FIR and SSCA resumed responsibility over this airspace on 8 July. Operation and upgrading of the airspace management was granted to Cambodian Air Traffic Services under a concession with a Thai-owned corporation SAMART.

== Statutory functions ==
The main effective aviation sector activity calls for performance of functions are summarized below:

1. Safety Regulation (Regulatory oversight function)

- Regulate and oversee the operations of Cambodia-registered aircraft
- Regulate and oversee the operations of Aerospace industries Flight Safety
- Regulate and oversee the operation of Airport Security
- Regulate and oversee the operations of Airport and Air Navigation;
- Perform Audit, Inspection and Certification;
- License aircraft maintenance, flight personnel and air traffic controllers;
- Manage, supervise and oversight the Airport Environment;
- Ensure that all existing rules and regulations in aviation are in accordance with the guidance and Standard and Recommended Practices stipulated by International Civil Aviation Organization (ICAO);
- Advise the Cambodian Government on matters related to civil aviation;
- Act internationally as the national body and authority representing Cambodia in respect of matters relating to civil aviation;

2. Air Services Development (Air Service Regulation and Promotion)

- Regulate and promote the development of air transport (air carriers and route development);
- Negotiate and liberalize air services agreements;
- Expand the international air services network between Cambodia and other countries.

3. Airports Regulation and Operations

- Regulate and oversee the planning, design, construction and operation of all of the airports in Cambodia, including all the airports under concession;
- Operate and manages all airports, except those for which concessions are granted;
- Plan, develop and maintain standards for efficiency and services in airport operations;
- Ensure the planning, building and maintenance of airport infrastructure is in accordance with specified standards;
- Administrate, oversee and facilitate the operations of airport Developers/ Operators in accordance with concession/management agreements, rules and regulations;
- Administer, oversee and monitor aircraft noise and noise mitigation measures;
- Administer policies relating to environmental protection and minimization of environmental disruption due to airport development and operation.

4. Airspace Regulation and Operations

- Plan and develop CNS/ATM systems;
- Regulate and oversee the operation of the Air Traffic Control Services Provider to ensure a safe, orderly and expeditious flow of aircraft movements within the Phnom Penh Flight Information Region (FIR);
- Provide search and rescue service to aircraft in distress within the Phnom Penh FIR;
- Administer, oversee, and facilitate the operations of the Air Traffic Control Services Provider in accordance with agreements, rules and regulations;
- Maximize airspace capability in cooperation with ICAO, IATA and other user groups.

5. National Civil Aviation Planning

- Initiate and formulate aviation policy planning, develop plans, define objectives, set targets for short medium and long term;
- Review, coordinate and initiate corrective actions to modify plans;
- Manage and update the National Civil Aviation Development Plan;
- Maintain responsibility for all infrastructure and business development for the air navigation system and the national airports;
- Advise the national government on all matters concerning the rules and regulations of civil aviation and the development of civil aviation infrastructure and operations;
- Administer, oversight and coordinate of all business development and operation under concession agreements;
- Manage and coordinate international regional and sub-regional cooperation related to civil aviation matters.
