= Kem Ley =

Cambodian political commentator and activist

- កែម ឡី
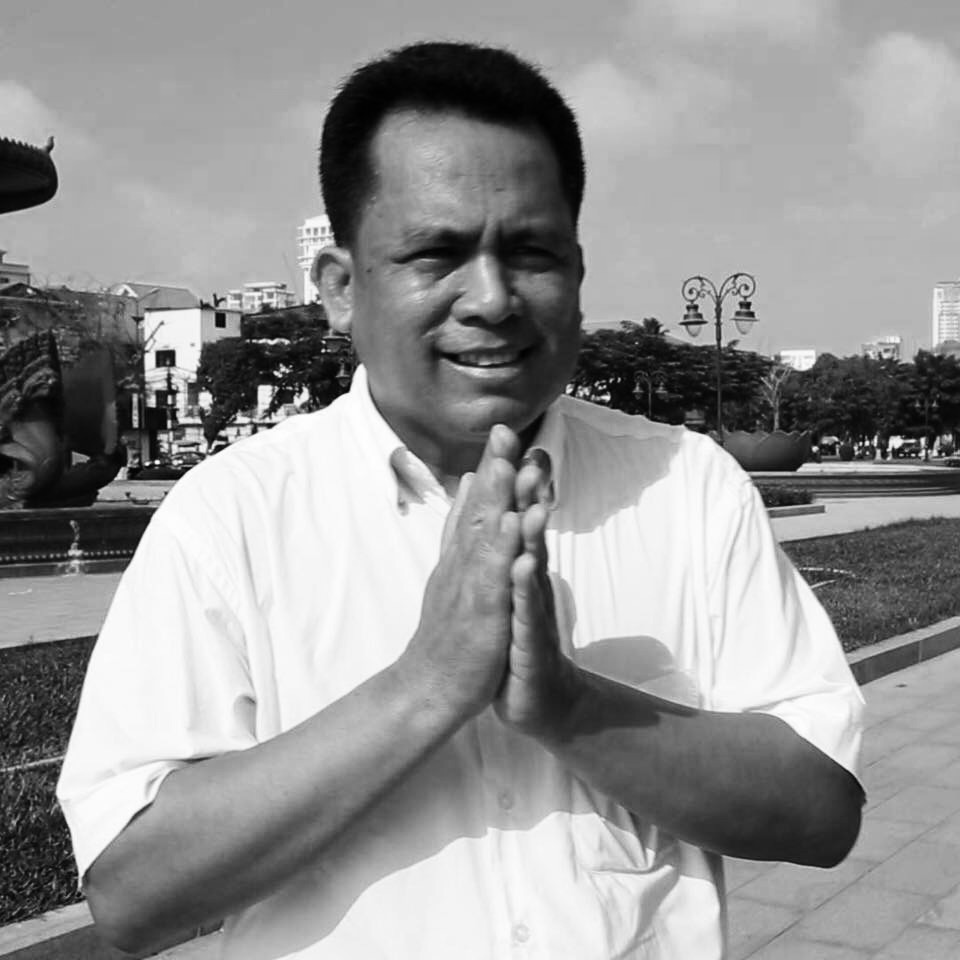
- Born: 19 October 1970; Leay Bour, Tram Kak, Takéo, Khmer Republic
- Died: 10 July 2016 (aged 45); Phnom Penh, Cambodia
- Cause of death: Assassination
- Resting place: Tram Kak, Takéo, Cambodia
- Education: University of Health Sciences; Chulalongkorn University; University of Malaya (PhD)
- Occupations: Activist; Physician; Political commentator
- Known for: Political commentary 2016 Assassination
- Political party: Grassroots Democratic Party (2015–16); Independent (Before 2015)
- Spouse: Bou Rachana
- Children: 5
- Website: kemley.work

Kem Ley (Khmer: កែម ឡី; 19 October 1970 – 10 July 2016) was a Cambodian activist, physician, and political commentator. He was known for his political commentary, including trenchant criticisms of the current government led by Cambodian People's Party (CPP). This made him popular with many Cambodian people and the opposition Cambodia National Rescue Party. He was assassinated in what has been claimed to have been a politically motivated attack on 10 July 2016 at a petrol station in Phnom Penh. He is the third notable activist to be killed in recent years, after union leader Chea Vichea in 2004, and environmental activist Chut Wutty in 2012.

== Education and career ==
Since 1998, he had worked as a researcher on HIV and AIDS projects and an analyst for a few non-governmental projects such as PSHRA and for other United Nations agencies such as UNDP, UNICEF, and UNAIDs, and for USAID. Ley was born in Leay Bour Commune, Tram Kok district, Takeo province. He finished his medical studies in 1992, and continued his master's degree in research studies at Chulalongkorn University, Thailand, from 1996 to 1997. In 2008, he received his PhD from Malaya University, Malaysia.

== Political commentary ==
Kem Ley was in the midst of his “100 days with Khmer Families” campaign in which he spent time staying with the rural families to dig even more deeply to find out the root causes of the many issues facing Cambodia today. He was also writing a series on his Facebook Page. The three known works he was working on include a 90-episode series of political articles which he called comedy series. He had just finished his 19th episode before his assassination; briefings of new findings during his 100-day campaign, and another story he named the “Black Man in a White Shirt”. He criticized the government over illegal logging, border issues, and corruption. Just a few days before his assassination, Kem Ley was approached by many local and international reporters to ask for his comments on the Global Witness report attacking Hun Sen’s family. The report was named, “Hostile Takeover: The Corporate Empire of Cambodia’s Ruling Family.”

In June 2015, he founded his own political party, the Grassroots Democracy Party.

Ley has been described as a Khmer nationalist. He also espoused anti-Vietnamese sentiment in his political commentary.

== Personal life ==
Ley was survived by his wife Bou Rachana, four sons, and one unborn child. Now his youngest son, Kem Ley Vireakboth, was born four months after his death. His wife expressed an interest to relocate her family to Australia for their safety. His family fled Cambodia in August 2016 to an undisclosed location.

== Assassination and aftermath ==
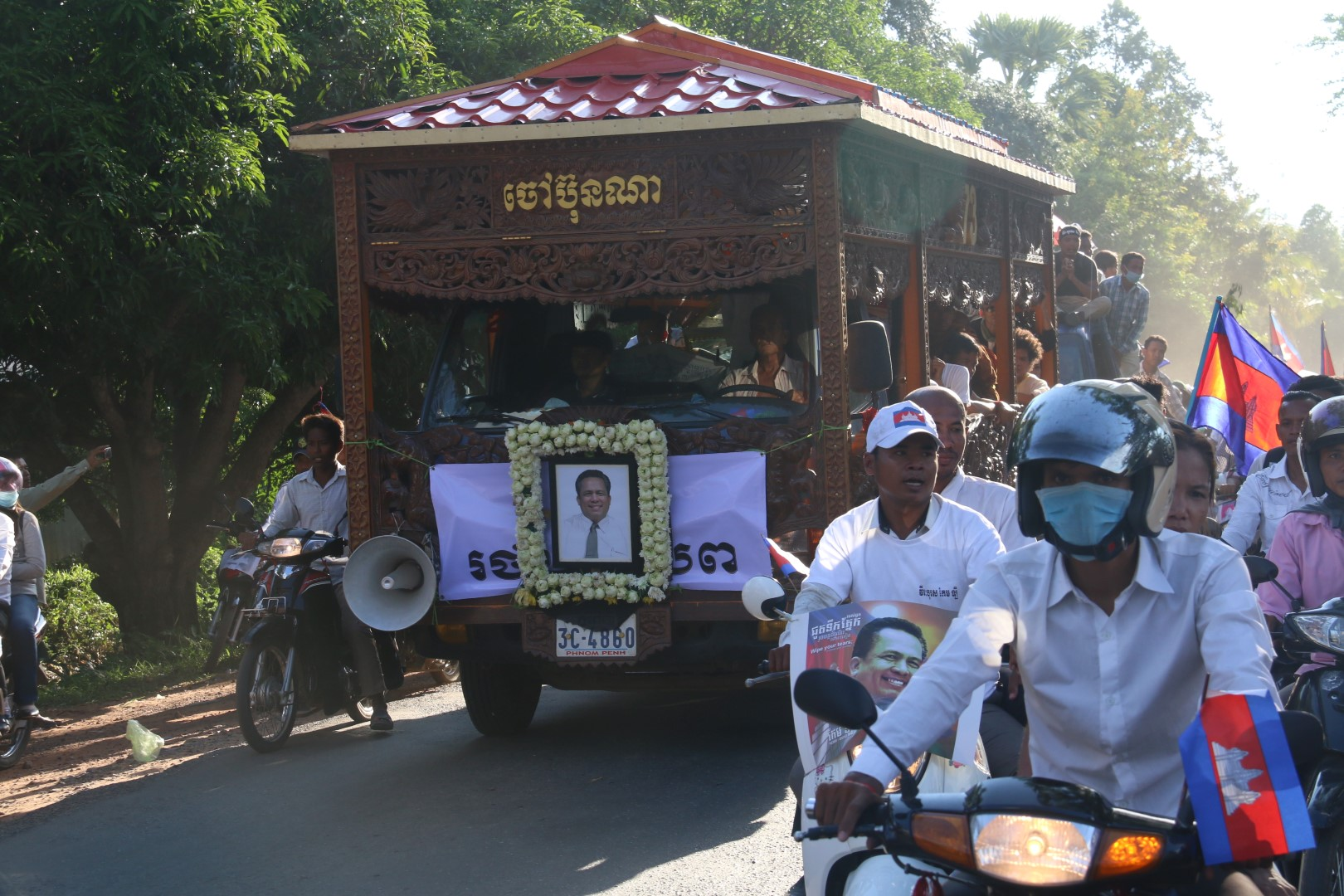
Funeral procession

Ley was shot on the morning of 10 July 2016 in a Star Mart café at a Caltex gas station in Phnom Penh. His death came days after he had criticized Hun Sen's family following the release of the Global Witness report which valued the premier's family at a minimum of US$200 million. A suspect was arrested, who later confessed to the crime. The suspect, who was sentenced to life in prison, claimed he shot Ley over a $3,000 debt, despite reports that no such debt existed because the two had never met. His body was draped in the Cambodian flag, and was taken to Wat Chas pagoda at Chroy Changva district. His death is widely believed to be politically influenced, though Prime Minister Hun Sen has downplayed these claims. His death was met with both domestic and international condemnations. The U.S. Department of State was "deeply concerned" by Ley's murder, and called for a full investigation. Similarly, the United Nations also urged authorities to investigate. The British ambassador to Cambodia Bill Longhurst called his death "a serious loss to Cambodia." Prime Minister Hun Sen condemned the murder, and urged for a full investigation.

His body was taken to his hometown in Takéo on 24 July 2016, with an estimated 2 million mourners at his funeral. It is the highest funeral turnout in history for a non-royal and non-government figure. He was laid to rest the following day on 25 July.

== Legacy ==
In July 2026, marking the tenth anniversary of Kem Ley's assassination, a comprehensive digital archive of his work was launched by the Cambodian diaspora in Australia. The preservation effort was initiated on the day of his death by his friends to ensure Ley's research remained accessible to the public.

Hosted online at kemley.work, the archive contains over 71,000 files comprising his speeches, handwritten notes, and research documents. The 2026 release made public several of Ley's previously unpublished writings, most notably his 2016 "Country Road Map," which outlined his vision for state reform and his analysis of the 2017 commune elections.

== See also ==
- Chea Vichea, union leader assassinated in 2004
- Chut Wutty, environmental activist assassinated in 2012
