= Koh Kong Bridge =

Bridge in Koh Kong, Cambodia

Coordinates: 11.6176°N 102.9710°E

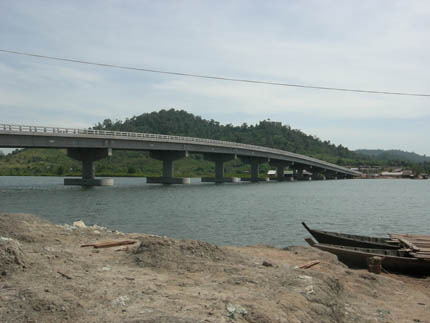
Koh Kong Bridge

The Koh Kong Bridge is a bridge in Koh Kong Province, Cambodia. The bridge crosses the Kaoh Pao river, linking the province capital of Khemarak Phoumin (also known as Koh Kong City) to Pyam, near the Thai border. It was the longest bridge in Cambodia at 1,900 metres (6,200 ft), and it was inaugurated in April 2002.

Koh Kong Bridge was built by LYP Group, a large Cambodian business and construction company started and owned by local tycoon and state senator Ly Yong Phat. LYP Group was supposed to operate the bridge for 30 years, as part of the construction deal, but the Cambodian State bought the bridge in October 2017 and crossing has been free since then.

Koh Kong Bridge is an important part of National Road 48 (NR 48), linking Koh Kong Province to the capital of Phnom Penh. In a larger scheme, the bridge also finalised a long land transport route, connecting Thailand with Vietnam.
