= Koh Kong =

Koh Kong, Kaoh Kong or Kaôh Kŏng may refer to several places in Cambodia:

- Koh Kong Province, a south western province of Cambodia
- Koh Kong (island), a large island in Koh Kong Province
- Koh Kong Bay, a bay on the coast of Koh Kong Province
- Koh Kong District, a district of Koh Kong Province
- Koh Kong (city), the capital of Koh Kong Province
- Koh Kong Mountain, the summit of Koh Kong island
- Koh Kong (village), a village on the island
