= Siamese Cambodians =

Siamese Cambodians សៀមកោះកុង ชาวไทยในกัมพูชา
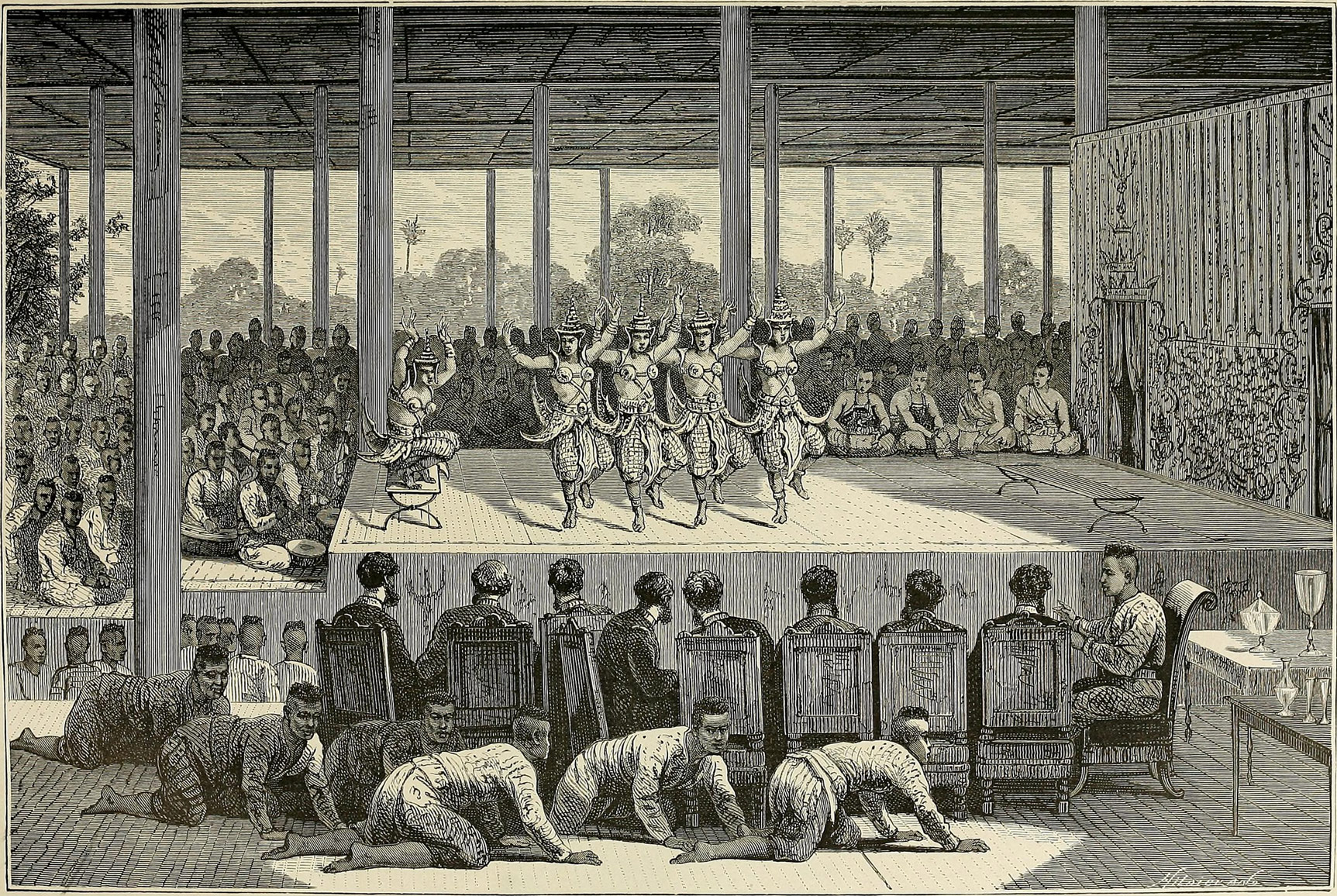
- A troupe of Siamese dancers arranged by King Norodom to welcome the French survey team in 1866.

Total population
- 48,340 in 2008; 9,043 with Thai citizenship in 2021

Regions with significant populations
- Koh_Kong, Inner_Cambodia

Languages
- Thai, Khmer

Religion
- Theravada Buddhism, Roman Catholicism

Siamese Cambodians, also known as Koh Kong Siamese (Khmer: សៀមកោះកុង, Siem Koh Kong, Thai: ชาวสยามเกาะกง) are Cambodians with Thai ethnicity, mostly based in Koh Kong Province. They account for 25% of the province's total population in 2008. Currently, they have received Khmer citizenship by law, but some people of Thai descent are refugees in Thailand. They primarily speak Khmer but many are still capable of speaking Thai.

== History ==
=== Thonburi Era ===
During the second fall of Ayutthaya, a large wave of Siamese refugees fled to Cambodia and the Principality of Hà Tiên. Later, King Taksin of Thonburi led an army into Hà Tiên and Cambodia in 1771 to eliminate all the Ayutthaya princes, nobles, and officials who had fled as they posed as potential threats to legitimacy since Taksin was considered a usurper.

According to oral accounts, the ancestor of Siamese Koh Kong people originated from Ban Lat Phli Ratchaburi to flee Burmese invasions. But migration to the region has occurred since the Ayutthaya period as the kingdom exerted more hegemony over Khmer territories. The region was established as Prachan Khiri Khet by the Siamese.

=== Rattanakosin Era ===
Siam established rule over many parts of Cambodian territory such as Inner Cambodia and Prachan Khiri Khet from 1794 to 1907. This led to the settlement of many Siamese in the region.

=== French Indochina era ===
After the Siamese government agreed to cede Trat and Prachan Khiri Khet to France according to the protocol of 24 June 1904 in order for France to withdraw its troops from Chanthaburi, another agreement was later signed between Siam and France on 23 March 1906, agreeing to cede Battambang, Siem Reap, and Sisophon to France in exchange for Dan Sai and Trat. However, France did not return Prachan Khiri Khet. The Thai people who remained there thus became displaced persons until the present day. Thai people in Prachan Khiri Khet who did not want to be under the rule of the French colonial rulers migrated to establish communities in Koh Kood District and Khlong Yai District, Trat Province.

== Groupings ==
=== Koh Kong ===
Before 1971, there were about 40,000 Thais living in Koh Kong, but during the Khmer Rouge regime, the number of Thais in Koh Kong decreased rapidly. Some migrated to the Thai side, while others were killed by the Khmer Rouge, leaving only about 8,000 Thais in Koh Kong by 1985.

During the time when Norodom Sihanouk was King-Minister, he forbade the people of Koh Kong from speaking Thai. Those who disobeyed would be arrested by the police, and some unlucky ones would be killed. At that time, General Lon Nol, who worked closely with Sihanouk, said, "Even if five thousand of the Thais of Koh Kong died, it would not make the Cambodian land tilt." Due to this oppression, Thai people in Koh Kong have therefore migrated to Thailand in four waves: the first wave (1959–1969) during the reign of Norodom Sihanouk, the second wave (1970–1975) during the reign of Lon Nol, the third wave (1975–1977) during the Vietnamese occupation of Cambodia, and the fourth wave (1977 onwards) are considered to be illegal immigrants. Currently, most Thai people in Koh Kong have relatives in Thailand, prefer to send their children to study in Thailand, and have a strong sense of their Thai identity. A considerable number of Thai people from Koh Kong remain in Thailand and have not migrated back to Cambodia, as many as 13,410 people as of 2008.

Many Thais from Koh Kong have played political roles in Cambodia, such as Say Phouthang, Cha Rieng (or Chamrieng Siriwong), and Tea Banh (or Sangwan Hinkling). Because the Thais in Koh Kong were aware of their otherness in Cambodia, they formed independent groups and the Koh Kong Thai Party, hoping for safety and independent self-government power for the Thai people. After the end of the Khmer Rouge era in 1979, the Cambodian central government declared that the Thais in Koh Kong were a minority ethnic group, legally citizens of Cambodia, equal to the Khmer people, with self-government freedom and the right to determine local administrative policies based on customs and traditions. In the Hun Sen government, several Thais have continuously held the position of governor of Koh Kong Province, including Yut Phuthong, Boonlert Phramkesorn, Rung Phramkesorn, and Mithuna Phuthong. These Koh Kong Thais who were the ruling class They are all related through marriage.

Currently, there is more interethnic marriage among the Thai people of Koh Kong. Many are married to Khmers from Kampot and Takeo provinces. They communicate with each other using the Southern Khmer dialect in their daily lives, but the accent is strange because the Koh Kong people tend to add Thai tonal sounds to it.

=== Battambang and Banteay Meanchey Provinces ===
Battambang and Banteay Meanchey Provinces were under the region of Inner Cambodia, which was controlled by the Siamese. These people speak Central Thai. During the early Rattanakosin period, many Khmer princes sought refuge under the benevolent protection of the Siamese king before returning to rule Cambodia. They brought Siamese court traditions back to the Khmer court. Khmer monks were sent to Siam to be ordained and teach religion, and also brought art forms back for use. Siamese monks went to spread religion and reside in Cambodia during the reign of King Rama III until the reign of King Rama V, as evidenced by the numerous Buddhist religious sites built in Thai architectural and art styles according to royal preferences.

Many Thais have resided in Battambang, such as the Abhaiwongse family, Luang Rueangdet Anan (Thongdi Thanarat), and Chit Phumisak. Currently, this group of Thais has largely assimilated into the Khmer population, but those over 80 years old can still speak the Thai language well.

However, descendants of the Abhayawong family residing in Battambang choose not to use the Thai surname Abhayawong for fear of political repercussions. The Cambodian side views the actions of Chao Phraya Abhayabhubesra as treason, even though the family's ancestors were Khmer. When Thailand regained the territories of Battambang and Phibun Songkhram from France under the government of Field Marshal Plaek Phibun Songkhram in 1941, the new territories had no troops stationed there, only Thai police. Thai refugees soon migrated to settle in the new territories, especially Battambang. The cost of living was low there, as it was a breadbasket, and the Thai government had not yet announced tax laws. This exempted them from taxes on raising livestock or fishing.

After Thailand returned the four provinces to France on December 9, 1946, the Thai government began sending Thai officials and their belongings back to Bangkok from October onwards. Thai citizens, along with some Khmer and Vietnamese people, requested to evacuate with the Thai officials and settle on the Thai side in the Aranyaprathet district. Although the territories returned to French and Cambodian rule respectively, the movement of Thai people from both sides continued, as evidenced by the fact that in the 1970s a number of Thai people drove cars to buy goods at the Srisophon market, which is about 50 kilometers from the Thai border.

Another group of Thai people, the Korat Thais, began migrating to Cambodia both before and after 1941. When Thailand lost the Second World War and returned the inner Cambodian territories to France, these Thai people became displaced persons. Currently, they are intermarrying with Khmer, Lao, and Kula people . Their only distinguishing characteristic is their use of the Thai language, which is becoming used less.

== Famous Thai people of Koh Kong ==
- Koi Luon or Luan Amphon – Governor of Kampot Province, 1979.
- General Kaev Tam or Kaeo Tam – Inspector General of the Armed Forces
- Cha Rieng or Chamrieng Sirivong – Former Governor of the National Bank of Cambodia.
- Tea Seiha – Governor of Siem Reap Province
- Tea Banh or Sangwal Hin Kling – Deputy Prime Minister and Minister of Defence and Member of Parliament for Siem Reap Province, affiliated with the Cambodian People's Party
- Tea Vinh – Commander-in-Chief of the Cambodian Navy.
- Thong Chon or Chon Inthasuwan – Deputy Minister of Commerce, Minister of Interior, currently a member of the Senate.
- Boon Lert or Boon Lert Phramkesorn – Former Governor of Koh Kong Province.
- General Porn Nara – Director of the Royal Thai Army Signal Corps
- Paitoon Phramkesorn – Deputy Governor of Koh Kong Province
- Mithuna Phuthong – Governor of Koh Kong Province
- Yuth Phuthong – Former Governor of Prey Veng and Koh Kong Provinces.
- Rung Phramkesorn – Former member of the National Assembly and former governor of Koh Kong Province.
- Ly Yong Phat or Phat Supapha – a Thai businessman from Koh Kong
- Say Phouthang – Former member of the Central Committee and Political Bureau of the People's Revolutionary Party, Vice President of the State Assembly (equivalent to the head of state at that time, Heng Samrin ).
- Eh Phouthong - Cambodian boxer (Kun Khmer) and kickboxer.
