= DSY =

DSY may refer to:

- Dassault Systèmes, a French software company
- Daisy Hill railway station, Greater Manchester, England (National Rail station code: DSY)
- Dara Sakor International Airport (IATA code: DSY)
