= Koh Kong Thai Displacement Campaign =

Cambodian crisis

- Part of Cambodian Civil War, Khmer Rouge purges and Cambodian Genocide
Date	1971–1980
Location	Koh Kong Province, Cambodia
Status	Decisive Cambodian victory: Mass displacement and flight of ethnic Thais to Thailand; Near-total cultural assimilation and demographic restructuring of Koh Kong Province
Territorial changes	Status quo ante bellum; consolidation of Cambodian state control over the frontier borderlands

Belligerents
(Cambodia) Khmer Rouge (Cambodia) Khmer Republic (prior to 1975)	Ethnic Thai civilians (Thai Koh Kong)

Commanders and leaders
Pol Pot; Ta Mok	(Unarmed civilian population); Say Phouthang

Strength
State military and security apparatus	~40,000 residents (pre-1971)

Casualties and losses
Minimal	Demographic decline: Population reduced from ~40,000 to ~8,000 individuals Displacement: ~32,000 fled or unaccounted for; thousands permanently displaced to Trat Province, Thailand

The Koh Kong Thai displacement (Thai: การอพยพของคนไทยเกาะกง) refers to the severe demographic decline, systemic cultural assimilation, and mass flight of the indigenous ethnic Thai population (Thai Koh Kong) from Koh Kong Province, Cambodia, during the mid-to-late 20th century. The crisis escalated over four major waves under successive Cambodian administrations—spanning the regimes of Norodom Sihanouk, Lon Nol, and culminating in targeted genocidal purges under the Khmer Rouge between 1975 and 1979.

== Background ==
Historically known in Thailand as Prachantakiri Khet (Thai: ประจันตคีรีเขต), the coastal region of Koh Kong was established as a frontier town under King Rama IV of Siam in 1855. Following the Franco-Siamese Treaty of 1904, sovereignty over the province was transferred to French Indochina in exchange for the evacuation of French troops from Chanthaburi.

Despite the territorial shift, ethnic Thais remained the predominant demographic group in the province for decades, maintaining their distinct language, customs, and economic reliance on fishing and cross-border trade with neighboring Trat Province, Thailand.

== Forced Assimilation Policies (1959–1975) ==
Following Cambodia's independence from France, subsequent national administrations under Norodom Sihanouk and later Lon Nol viewed the concentration of ethnic Thais along the maritime border with geopolitical suspicion. During the 1950s and 1960s, particularly during the Preah Vihear Temple dispute, Thai Koh Kong residents were frequently suspected of acting as intelligence spies for Thailand. Systemic efforts were enacted to dismantle the localized Thai identity:

- Linguistic Suppression: The state instituted a strict public ban on the usage of the Thai language. Individuals caught speaking Thai were arrested or subjected to severe escalating financial penalties, which initially stood at 25 riels and later escalated to 50 riels. General Lon Nol reportedly remarked on the campaign that "even if 5,000 ethnic Thais were to die, it would not tilt the Cambodian land."
- Currency Restrictions: Possessing or trading in Thai Baht was criminalized to forcibly sever economic ties with Thailand.
- Cultural Eradication: Local authorities conducted systematic house-to-house searches. All discovered Thai literature, books, or historical records were confiscated and publicly burned.

== Khmer Rouge Purges (1975–1979) ==
Conditions reached a critical nadir following the fall of Phnom Penh to the Khmer Rouge in 1975. The ultranationalist regime targeted ethnic minority groups across Cambodia. The ethnic Thais of Koh Kong were heavily targeted due to their linguistic and familial ties to capitalist Thailand.

While local resistance movements did emerge—most notably led by Say Phouthang, an ethnic-Thai communist who organized partisan activities in the Cardamom Mountains—civilian hamlets suffered heavy reprissal purges. Thais were executed, subjected to forced labor, or died of systemic starvation.

== Impact and Aftermath ==
=== Demographic Collapse ===
The campaign resulted in an unprecedented contraction of the native population. Prior to the entry of the Khmer Rouge in 1971, the estimated ethnic Thai population stood at approximately 40,000 individuals. By 1985, official assessments indicated that only 8,000 ethnic Thais remained within the province. This represented a catastrophic 80% reduction in the local indigenous Thai presence through a combination of systematic executions, starvations, and border flights.

=== Refugee Flight and Legal Limbo ===
The combination of cultural suppression and military conflict triggered four distinct waves of migration across the border into Thailand. The vast majority sought refuge in Thailand's Trat Province (specifically within the Khlong Yai and Mueang districts). Thousands settled permanently as displaced persons. Because historical provincial archives were destroyed during the campaigns, many generations of displaced Koh Kong Thais faced decades-long legal battles to acquire legal Thai citizenship documents.

=== Demographic Realignment ===
Following the overthrow of the Khmer Rouge in 1979, Koh Kong Province was severely underpopulated. The new central government launched aggressive domestic resettlement programs, providing land incentives to encourage internal migration of ethnic Khmer citizens into the coastal province.. This massive inward migration, combined with the previous flight of the Thais, permanently altered the landscape. Once a clear ethnic Thai majority area, the Thai Koh Kong were reduced to a distinct minority group making up roughly 25% of the total regional population.

== See also ==
- Franco-Siamese War
- Franco-Thai War
- Dangrek Incident
- Siamese Cambodians
- Cambodian genocide
- Say Phouthang
- Cambodian–Thai border dispute
