= Chut Wutty =

Cambodian environmental activist

- Wutty with a crocodile in the forest
- Born: 1972; Kandal, Khmer Republic
- Died: 26 April 2012 (aged 40); Koh Kong, Cambodia
- Cause of death: Homicide
- Occupation: Environmental activist
- Employer: Natural Resource Protection Group
- Known for: I Am Chut Wutty, Last Line Productions
- Children: 2

Chut Wutty (Khmer: ឈុត វុទ្ធី; 1972 – 26 April 2012) was a Cambodian environmental activist who was founder and director of the Natural Resource Protection Group (NRPG). He was best known as a vocal critic of the military's alleged role in illegal logging conducted by companies granted land concessions in protected forests and related government corruption. He was shot dead near a protected forest while accompanying two journalists investigating logging.

== Life ==
Wutty was born in Svay Meas village, Vihear Sour commune, Khsach Kandal district, Kandal province, Cambodia. Chut Wutty obtained a master's degree in Military Studies from Russia in 1992. Wutty is survived by his wife, two daughters, and a son.

== Career ==
After his graduation, Wutty was employed as an Electrician's Helper by the small Canadian Contingent of the United Nations Transitional Authority in Cambodia (UNTAC) with 92 (CDN) Transportation Company, Delta Platoon, Electrical and Mechanical Engineers (EME) Det at Camp Canada, Pochentong Airport, now known as Phnom Penh International Airport, until 1993.

Later he worked with the Cambodian Mine Action Centre (CMAC) and as a military trainer at the Ministry of National Defence. In 2003, he was a Deputy Director of Global Witness in Cambodia, who acted as a watchdog on the illegal logging all over the country. After the expulsion of Global Witness by the Cambodian government, Wutty founded the organization Natural Resource Protection Group (NRPG), with financial support from Germany. The organization has its focus on the protection of the forest and natural resources in Cambodia.

== Death ==
On 26 April 2012, Wutty was shot dead at Veal Bei Point in Mondol Seima. At the time, he was escorting two female journalists from The Cambodia Daily near a protected forest in Koh Kong Province, where he had repeatedly attempted to expose illegal logging rackets that include military officials. He was 40 years old. Some sources claimed that he died at the age of 45 or 46 years old.

== Investigation ==
Local rights groups ADHOC and LICADHO immediately dispatched investigators, and LICADHO's Koh Kong provincial coordinator. This was supported by other rights groups. In Kong Chet, said that after talking to ballistics police, he had established that Chut Wutty was shot as he tried to drive away from the military police. The investigation, however, was unsuccessful and the case was closed.

== Documentary film ==
The film "I Am Chut Wutty" (2015) depicts Chut Wutty's work to defend Prey Lang forest, including an attack against Chut Wutty by armed military at a rubber plantation concession and deforestation site in Prey Lang forest, Kampong Thom Province. He was rescued by community members. Chut Wutty is the main protagonist in the film, which charts the destruction of Cambodia's forests to make way for agricultural developments. Family members, witnesses to Chut Wutty's murder, and his colleagues, describe the events leading up to and following the murder.

== Reactions ==
In September 2014, he was honored by U.S. President Barack Obama, during his speech at the Clinton Global Initiative, for his activism while he was alive.

In October 2014, the Collaborative Partnership on Forests, an international consortium of 14 organizations, secretariats and institutions working on international forest issues, awarded an Honourable Mention to Chut Wutty, as part of the Wangari Maathai Forest Champion Award. This award, inaugurated in 2012, recognizes individuals who make outstanding contributions to preserve, restore, and sustainably manage forests.
