= KKZ =

KKZ may refer to:

- Kaska language of Canada (ISO-639: kkz)
- Koh Kong Airport in Cambodia (IATA: KKZ)
- Kottarakara railway station, a railway station in Kerala
