= Dara Sakor =

Special economic zone in Cambodia

Dara Sakor (Khmer: តារាសាគរ, lit. 'Star Ocean'; Chinese: 七星海; pinyin: Qīxīnghǎi; lit. 'Seven Star Ocean') is a special economic zone in Cambodia. The zone encompasses 139 square miles (360 km^{2}) carved out of Botum Sakor National Park, along the coastline of Koh Kong province, encompassing nearly 20% of Cambodia's coastline. In 2007, the Chinese government adopted it as a Belt and Road Initiative project, underwriting a US$15 million bond. In 2008, the Cambodian government granted Chinese-owned Union Development Group (UDG), a subsidiary of Wanlong Group based in Tianjin, a 99-year lease to operate the zone, which includes a US$3.9 billion investment to build the Dara Sakor International Airport, a deep water port, an industrial zone, and resort facilities. Dara Sakor's developments have courted significant scrutiny for corruption, potential use by the Chinese military, land disputes, and illicit operations, including human trafficking and cyber scamming (see Scam centers in Cambodia).

== Ownership ==
Union Development Group (UDG) is the principal developer of Dara Sakor. UDG is a subsidiary of Tianjin Youlian Development Group Company, a major property developer founded by Li Zhiqiang. A major development partner is Zhengheng Group, owned by Deng Pibing. The project's financing sources remain unclear. The American government describes UDG as a Chinese state-owned firm, although the company itself has denied these allegations.

== Controversies ==
=== Land seizures ===
Over 1,000 families were impacted by the project, with entire villages evicted and resettled without appropriate compensation. UDG seized and demolished local land with assistance from private security and the Royal Cambodian Armed Forces under the leadership of senior general Kun Kim. Forests from Botum Sakor National Park were cleared, despite existing Cambodian law that only enables protected areas to be transferred by royal decree. In March 2018, the Cambodian government directed its Ministry of Environment to return some land to villagers. In October 2021, hundreds of local families impacted by the land dispute refused the proposed lottery-based compensation from the developer for being inadequate.

=== Illicit operations ===
Cyber scam and human trafficking operations have been reported in Dara Sakor's Long Bay project. As of July 2022, at least 50 human trafficking victims had been rescued from Long Bay. Long Bay was previously connected to She Zhijiang, a convicted Chinese businessman, and Deng Pibing, a Chinese businessman currently wanted by Interpol.

=== Possible military use ===
The United States Department of State has asserted that the Dara Sakor airport's 3,400 m (11,200 ft) airstrip can host Chinese military aircraft. The deep-water port can also support Chinese warships. The Cambodian government has granted the Chinese government exclusive rights to operate within the nearby Ream Naval Base, Cambodia's largest, for 30 years.

=== US sanctions ===
In September 2020, the United States government blacklisted UDG for corruption, land seizures from locals, and from "credible reports" the development could be used to host Chinese military assets.

== See also ==
- Cambodia–China relations
- Special Economic Zones of Cambodia
- Belt and Road Initiative
