= Koh Kong Airport =

Airport in Cambodia

- IATA: KKZ; ICAO: VDKK

Summary
- Airport type: Defunct
- Serves: Koh Kong
- Location: Smach Mean Chey, Khemarak Phoumin, Koh Kong, Cambodia
- Elevation AMSL: 13 ft / 4 m
- Coordinates: 11°36′47.6″N 102°59′51.4″E

Map
- Location of Koh Kong Airport in Cambodia

Runways
Direction	Length		Surface
Direction	ft	m	Surface
12/30	4,270	1,301	Dirt
- Source: Landings.com

Koh Kong Airport (IATA: KKZ, ICAO: VDKK) is an abandoned airport located in Smach Mean Chey District, Khemarak Phoumin Municipality, Koh Kong province, Cambodia.

== See also ==
- List of airports in Cambodia
