= Koh Kong Safari World =

- Interactive map of Koh Kong Safari World
- Date closed: 2018
- Location: Koh Kong Province, Cambodia

Koh Kong Safari World was a zoo and an animal theme park in Cambodia, located 500m from the border crossing to Thailand. Species included elephant, dolphin, tiger, orangutan, and bird shows.

Koh Kong Safari World was most widely known for its controversial "Orangutan Boxing" matches. During these performances, orangutans were trained to act as “fighters” in mock boxing bouts for the entertainment of visitors. Alongside the staged boxing matches, the animals were also made to perform other activities such as riding bicycles, spinning hula hoops, and wearing elaborate costumes. Reports from animal welfare groups noted that some costumes were intentionally provocative or degrading, including outfits resembling human stereotypes.

The zoo was transferred in 2018 to a new location in Phnom Penh, under the name Phnom Penh Safari World.
