= Kiri Sakor District =

Kiri Sakor ស្រុកគីរីសាគរ
- District (srok)
- Location in Cambodia

- Location in Cambodia
- Coordinates: 11°0′N 103°10′E
- Country: Cambodia
- Province: Koh Kong
- Communes: 3
- Villages: 9

Population (1998)
  - Total: 6,289
- Time zone: +7
- Geocode: 0902

Kiri Sakor District (Khmer: ស្រុកគីរីសាគរ) is a district (srok) of Koh Kong Province, in south-western Cambodia. All of Kiri Sakor is part of Botum Sakor National Park since 1993.

== Administration ==
The district is subdivided into three khum (communes) and nine phum (villages).

Kiri Sakor District
Khum (Commune)	Phum (Villages)
Kaoh Sdach	Kaoh Sdach, Peam Kay, Preaek Smach
Phnhi Meas	Phnhi Meas, Kien Kralanh, Ta Ni
Preaek Khsach	Preaek Khsach, Ta Kaev, Yeay Saen

== See also ==
- Botum Sakor National Park
- Dara Sakor International Airport
