= Dara Sakor International Airport =

Airport in Cambodia

Dara Sakor International Airport អាកាសយានដ្ឋានអន្តរជាតិតារាសាគរ Akasayeanatthan Antaracheat Dara Sako
- IATA: DSY; ICAO: VDDS

Summary
- Airport type: Public
- Operator: Vinci Airports
- Location: Botum Sakor, Koh Kong, Cambodia
- Coordinates: 10.915°N 103.224°E
- Website: darasakor-airport.com/en/

Map
- Location in Cambodia

Runways
Direction	Length		Surface
Direction	ft	m	Surface
03/21	10,498	3,200	Concrete

Dara Sakor International Airport (IATA: DSY, ICAO: VDDS) is an airport in Botum Sakor District, Koh Kong province, Cambodia. It was developed at a cost of $350 million by Chinese-owned Tianjin Union Development Group. The airport will have its first test flights in mid-2023. It will also serve the new Dara Sakor Resort. After a two-year delay, Governor of Koh Kong has announced at a press conference that the airport will begin operations in mid-2023. Now, the airport is ready for domestic flights using small aircraft by the end of November

== Completion ==
Dara Sakor International Airport, located in Botum Sakor District, Koh Kong Province, has an investment of around $200 million (Phase 1) by the Chinese company Union Development Group. The project started from 2018 and has been completed by 2024.

The airport is built on 218 hectares and has set aside nearly 1,000 hectares for the development of various support projects.

== Controversy ==
The airport is strategically positioned, located near Cambodia's largest naval base, Ream Naval Base.

The airport's 3,400 m (11,200 ft) airstrip is unusually long and can host Chinese military aircraft. Based on 'circumstantial evidence,' the US Department of Defense has raised concern that the airport could be used as a PLA Air Force base, however the airport does not have any infrastructure suggesting military use. In 2020, the US placed sanctions against the airport's developer, claiming it was built on seized land and citing possible Chinese military use. Both Tianjin Union group and the Cambodian government have refuted these claims.

== Airlines and destinations ==
=== Passenger ===
Airlines	Destinations
Air Cambodia	Phnom Penh
Cambodia Airways	Phnom Penh

== See also ==
- List of airports in Cambodia
- Koh Kong Airport
