= Botum Sakor National Park =

National park in Cambodia

- Khmer: ឧទ្យានជាតិបុទុមសាគរ, Ŏtyéanchéatĕ Bŏtŭm Sakôr
- Location within Cambodia
- Location: Koh Kong Province, Cambodia
- Nearest city: Sihanoukville
- Coordinates: 11.11553035°N 103.24969205°E
- Area: 1,825.85 km^{2} (704.96 sq mi)
- Established: 1993
- Governing body: Cambodian Ministry of Environment, Department of Nature Conservation and Protection

Botum Sakor National Park is the largest national park in Cambodia. Situated on the coast of the Gulf of Thailand, Botum Sakor (also spelled "Botumsakor") is a peninsula projecting southwest from the Cardamom Mountains. The national park comprises an area of 1,825.85 km^{2} (704.96 sq mi) and spans three districts of Koh Kong Province: Kiri Sakor, Botum Sakor and Koh Kong. The park is under the administration of the Cambodian Ministry of Environment, and a small part of the park is included in the Southern Cardamom REDD+ Project (SCRP).

== The landscape ==
The majority of Botum Sakor National Park is gently sloping lowland covered by evergreen woods and grasslands, emerging in floodplains with mangrove forests and freshwater swamp forests near the coasts. It experiences a tropical monsoon climate and two high tides per day, with a tidal range of approximately 1.5 m (4 ft 11 in). The human population living within Botum Sakor National Park is unknown.

== Wildlife ==
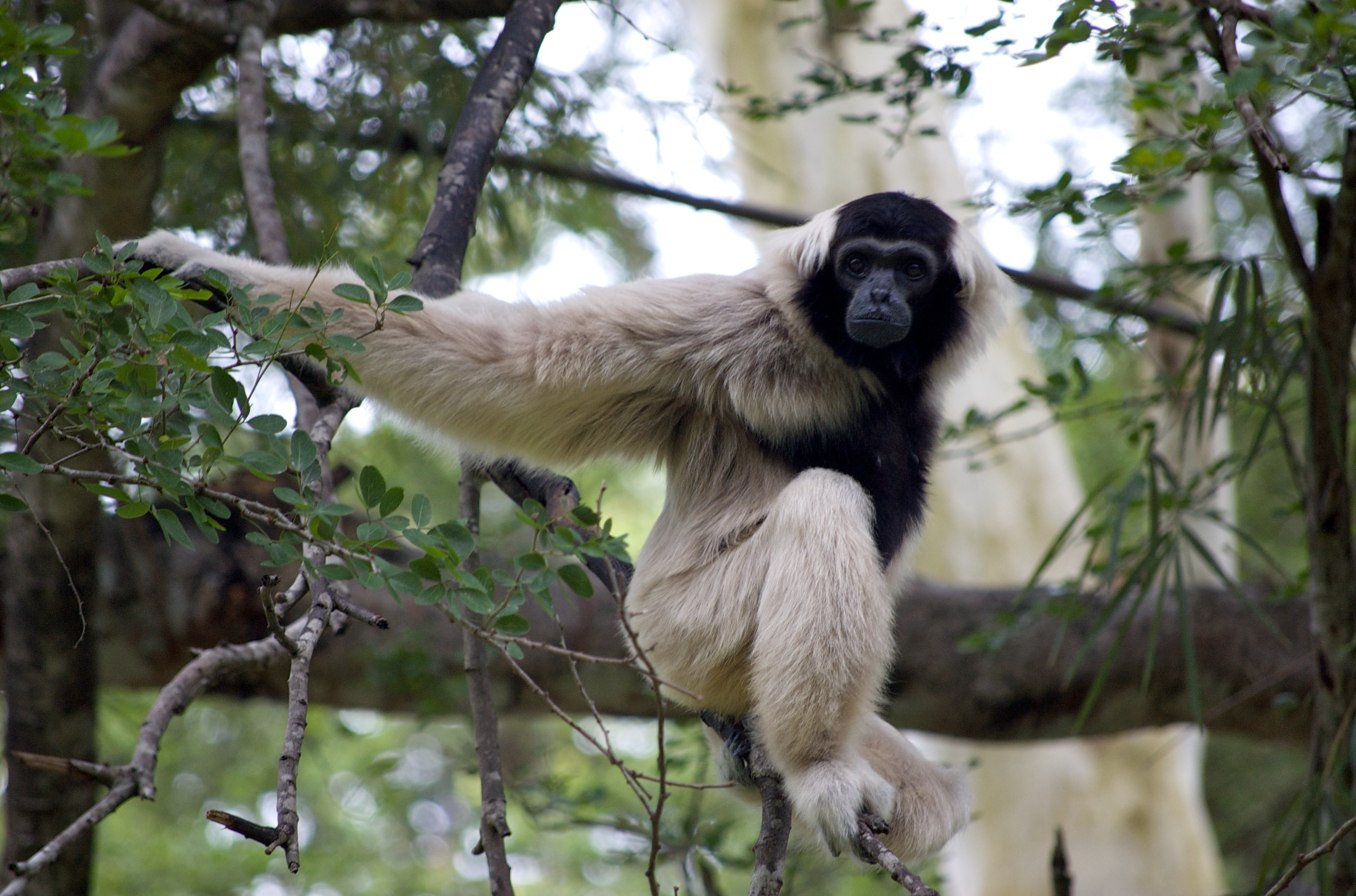
Pileated gibbon (Hylobates pileatus)

Botum Sakor National Park has rich and varied wildlife, but little on-location research has been published on the biodiversity of the area.

=== Mammals ===
As of 2009, evidence of over 44 mammal species have been found within the national park boundaries, eight of which are of high conservation priority, being listed as endangered on the IUCN Red List, some of them critically. These endangered species includes the Sunda pangolin (Manis javanica), Bengal slow loris (Nycticebus bengalensis), Germain's langur (Trachypithecus germaini), Indian hog deer (Axis porcinus), dhole (Cuon alpinus), clouded leopard (Neofelis nebulosa), fishing cat (Prionailurus viverrinus), Asian elephant (Elephas maximus), and pileated gibbon (Hylobates pileatus). The pileated gibbon forms a considerable population and it has been speculated, that the national park might in fact contain as much as 10% of the global population.

Many other threatened species have their home in Botum Sakor National Park, in fact over a quarter of the mammalian species here are of conservation interest due to their global status. These include large-toothed ferret-badger (Melogale personata), hairy-nosed otter (Lutra sumatrana), smooth-coated otter (Lutra perspicillata), sambar deer (Rusa unicolor), large-spotted civet (Viverra megaspila) and more. Possibly sun bear and moon bear might be present here as well.

=== Amphibians ===
Surprisingly only a relatively small number of amphibian species have been found on the premisses of the national park. The area was expected to hold a large number of species, since the Cardamom Mountains are home to many, there are a broader variety of ecosystems to be found in Botum Sakor. Many of the amphibians found in the park, are of great importance nonetheless. Both the Mortensen's frog (Sylvirana mortenseni) and spine-glanded mountain frog (Quasipaa fasciculispina) are endemic to the south west of Cambodia and the Thailand-owned section of the mountain range.

=== Reptiles ===
Most of the many reptiles of Botum Sakor are snakes, including the charismatic king cobra and Malayan pit viper. Snakes are regularly seen and subsequently hacked to death by local residents at local plantations. There is also a small population of Siamese crocodiles in some of the parks creeks. Cambodia in fact retains the world's largest population of this critically endangered species, which was recently (2007) thought to be extinct even. The larger saltwater crocodile is also here, although it is of least concern from a global conservational viewpoint, they are threatened in South-east Asia. In Cambodia, saltwater crocodiles are thought to be restricted to Koh Kong Province. Two threatened species of turtle and one species of tortoise is also found in the Cardamom mountain range.

=== Birds ===
There are hundreds of species of birds to be found within the park area, but only preliminary research has been carried out so far. Of particular interest to conservationists is the white-winged wood duck (Asarcornis scutulata), which is endangered and one of the rarest waterfowls in Asia. There are a number of other threatened or near-threatened birds here too, like green peafowl (Pavo muticus), lesser adjutant (Leptoptilos javanicus), Oriental darter (Anhinga melanogaster), great pied hornbill (Buceros bicornis) and grey-headed fish eagle (Haliaeetus ichthyaetus).

=== Insects ===
The research on the lepidopterans (butterflies and moths) in Botum Sakor is also preliminary and at the same time unique for the country as a whole, since very little research on this group have been published on Cambodia at all. As of 2009, 147 species of lepidopterans have been recorded in the park, with as many as 49 species in the family Nymphalidae alone. Almost all the lepidopteran species (and individuals) were found in the dense forests or the swamp forests, with very few in the open areas of meadow and river edge habitats. A larger number of species of the subfamily Satyrinae has been registered in the swampy forest habitats; a mean of 38 species per habitat area. The most common species in the park overall, seems to be the common evening brown butterfly (Melanitis leda). Due to the lack of identification literature on butterflies and moths in Cambodia, a number of unidentifiable species have been caught during research projects.

Understanding the distribution and development of the butterflies and moths are important in understanding and managing the national parks, as they are good indicator species of the environment. The relatively high percentage of Nymphalidae species in Botum Sakor are, in addition to other factors, reflecting that the habitats are indeed disturbed by excessive clear cutting and logging.

== Threats and concerns ==
Disturbance of Botum Sakor National Park is extremely high. In the years 1997 - 2002, an estimated 229 km^{2} of evergreen forest was lost through illegal logging (~30 km^{2}/year).^{2} These initial crimes and large scale destructive activities, was eventually halted at the beginning of the new millennium, but the national park is now facing an increasing threat of destruction under the pretext of so-called development^{1} at both local, national and international levels.

=== Agriculture, industry and construction projects ===
After establishing the Botum Sakor National Park in 1993, the Government of Cambodia apparently decided, that a large part of the land should be used for various agro-industrial and construction projects. A series of Economic Land Concessions has been issued and signed in recent years. How land is exploited, sold and leased in Cambodia is notoriously murky, but below is a list of well documented projects in relation to the park:

In November 1998, a concession agreement was signed with the Chinese company The Green Rich Co., Ltd. to plant, grow and harvest oil palms, fruit trees and acacia in a 60,200 ha (602 km^{2}) area. More than 80% of the land is located within Botum Sakor National Park in the north-east and constitutes roughly 40% of the Koh Kong Districts contribution to the national park. The project was initially scheduled to be carried out in 6 stages, converting 10,000 ha of the national park to plantations in each stage, but disputes with the Cambodian Ministry of Environment arose.

In April 2008, a concession agreement lasting 99 years was signed with Tianjin Union Development Group for the purpose of developing Dara Sakor on an area of 36,000 ha (360 km^{2}) for tourism. The land is in both Kiri Sakor District and Botum Sakor District. Resort brochures show ambitious plans: a new airport with a capacity of 10 million passengers a year, double the capacity of Phnom Penh International Airport and more than 40 times the number of visitors who arrived in 2017 at Sihanouk International Airport, docking facilities for full-size cruise ships, and high-speed rail connections to Phnom Penh and Siem Reap.

In August 2009, a concession agreement was signed with Koh Kong sez Co., Ltd., to initiate a large scale agro-industrial project in a 9,977 ha (99.77 km^{2}) area. The land is located within the Kiri Sakor District.

In April 2010, a concession agreement lasting 90 years was signed with the Cambodian company L.Y.P Group Co., Ltd. To construct Tapioca plantations in a 4,097 ha (40.97 km^{2}) area. The land is located in the upper-middle of the national park, mainly in the Botum Sakor District, but involving all of the three districts contributing to the park.

In January 2011, a concession agreement was signed with the company Paradise Investment Co., Ltd. for business activities in a 9,835 ha (98.35 km^{2}) area. The land is located in the interior of the Botum Sakor District. Paradise Investment Co., Ltd. is South Korean based and primarily engaged in the casino business, but it operates in three associated segments: casinos, hotels and spas.

In July 2011, a concession agreement was signed with the company Sinimexim Investment Co., Ltd. to construct rubber plantations and conduct unspecified agro-industrial business activities in a 4,280 ha (42.80 km^{2}) area. The land is located in the interior of the Botum Sakor District, just north of the land concession with Paradise Investment Co., Ltd.

In December 2012, a contract was signed with an unknown company to construct a reservoir and hydropower dam, involving a 6,771 ha (67.71 km^{2}) area. The land is apparently located in the Botum Sakor District.

==== Impact ====
A simple calculation reveals that the total area involved in the agricultural, industrial and constructional projects, adds up to more than 119,120 ha (1191.2 km^{2}). This comprise 70% of the national park. Needless to say, if the projects are allowed to unfold as they are planned, it will mean the ultimate destruction dissolution of Botum Sakor National Park.

Landsat satellite images, journalistic investigations and activist reports clearly shows how large areas have been clear-cut at an accelerated pace in the concessions since 2008. Especially the coastal mangrove has suffered and is almost non-existing throughout the park, as of 2012.

=== Illegal logging ===
There is now substantial evidence, that the criminal practices of illegal logging on the premises of the national park, has become a problem once again in the last few years and at an alarmingly accelerated pace even. Satellite images (Landsat and Envisat), journalistic investigations and activist reports shows how the formerly densely forested interior has been thinned to an extent, that almost all of Botum Sakor National Park has been directly affected. Many of the densely forested habitats are now degraded and categorized as so-called mixed forest habitat because of this thinning. There seems to be a number of reasons for the new illegal logging practices and various groups participate, spanning from opportunistic locals, some of the companies involved in the concessions (see above) and organized criminal syndicates. Some of the logged timbers are rosewood and various threatened hardwood species used in luxury buildings and for expensive furniture, but also plants like the saffrol laurel tree (Cinnamomum parthenoxylon, a member of the cinnamon tree genus) and yellow vine are being cut and collected to make psychoactive drugs like ecstasy for south-east Asian traditional medicine and other purposes. Many spots where illegal timbers and plant harvests are processed or cut up, have been uncovered within the national park itself.

=== Poaching ===
Poaching in Cambodias national parks remains extremely rampant and Botum Sakor is no exclusion to this trend. The methods that are most disturbing in Botum Sakor are the setting of snare traps, and the opportunistic hunting of small mammal species for food. The poaching in Cambodia have many reasons, but one of the reasons in Botum Sakor National Park is feeding the traditional Chinese medicinal market.

=== Fragmentation of habitats ===
Habitat fragmentation of the national park is a concern. The recently completed highway route 48 along the northern boundary of the park isolates it from the southern Cardamom Mountains. While some animals can cope, the highway have clearly fragmented and confined the arboreal species population such as the pileated gibbon.

== Active NGOs in the area ==
The following NGOs are known to be active in the area:

- Flora & Fauna International
- Conservation International
- Wildlife Alliance

== Sources ==
- REPORT 4 Fauna and flora diversity studies in Botum Sakor National Park, Cambodia April 2005 – September 2009 Frontier Cambodia, January 2010. Society for Environmental Exploration 2010.
- Royan, A. (2010) Significant mammal records from Botum-Sakor National Park, Southwest Cambodia. Cambodian Journal of Natural History, 2010 (1): 22–26.
- Royan, A. (2009) Avifaunal inventory with annotated accounts for Botum-Sakor National Park, Southwest Cambodia. Cambodian Journal of Natural History, 2009 (1): 26–39.
- Royan, A. (2009) Confirmation of the endangered fishing cat Prionailurus viverrinus in Botum-Sakor National Park, Southwest Cambodia. Bulletin of the IUCN/SSC cat specialist group, 51: 10–11.
- The Phnom Penh Post: "Work on $5 billion tourism project begins", October 1.st 2010.
- Cambodian Government authorises clear-cutting global witness
- Open Development Cambodia ODC
