= Mondol Seima District =

Mondol Seima ស្រុកមណ្ឌលសីម៉ា
- District (srok)
- Location in Cambodia

- Location in Cambodia
- Country: Cambodia
- Province: Koh Kong
- Communes: 3
- Villages: 13

Population (1998)
  - Total: 12,569
- Time zone: +7
- Geocode: 0906

Mondol Seima District (Khmer: ស្រុកមណ្ឌលសីម៉ា) is a district (srok) of Koh Kong Province, in south-western Cambodia. The Kah Bpow River flows through it.

== Administration ==
Mondol Seima District
Khum (Commune)	Phum (Villages)
Bak Khlang	Bak Khlang Muoy, Bak Khlang Pir, Bak Khlang Bei, Boeng Kachhang, Kaoh Pao, Neang Kok, Cham Yeam
Peam Krasaob	Peam Krasob Ti Muoy, Peam Krasob Ti Pir
Tuol Kokir Leu	Tuol Kokir Kraom, Tuol Kokir Leu, Ta Chat, Kaoh Chak
