= Srae Ambel District =

Srae Ambel ស្រែអំបិល
- District
- Srae Ambel District ស្រុកស្រែអំបិល
- Interactive map of Srae Ambel
- Country: Cambodia
- Province: Koh Kong
- Subdivisions: 6 communes

Population (1998)
  - Total: 38,435
- Time zone: UTC+07:00 (ICT)
- Geocode: 0906

Srae Ambel (Khmer: ស្រែអំបិល [srae ʔɑmɓəl]) is a district (srok) of Koh Kong Province, in south-western Cambodia.

Srae Ambel District
Commune (Khum)	Village(s) (Phum)
Boeng Preav	Ou Chrov, Boeng Preav, Chrouy, Phlaong, Sala Mneang, Stueng Chhay, Tuek Paong
Chi Kha Kraom	An Chh'aeut, Chambak, Khsach Kraham, Nea Pisei, Ta Baen, Preak Cheak
Chi Kha Leu	Chhuk, Chi Kha, Ta Ni, Trapeang Kandaol
Chrouy Svay	Chrouy Svay Khang Leu, Nesat, Kampong Sdam, Saray, Phnum Sralau, Chheu Neang, Chrouy Svay Khang Kaeut, Kaev Phos
Dang Peaeng	Ban Tiet, Dang Peaeng, Prang, Preah Angk Kaev, Thorng
Srae Ambel	Chamkar Kraom, Khlong, Srae Ambel, Trapeang, Treak, Veal Cheung, Veal Tboung
