= Khemarak Phoumin =

Khemarak Phoumin ក្រុងខេមរភូមិន្ទ Koh Kong
- City
- Khemarak Phoumin City
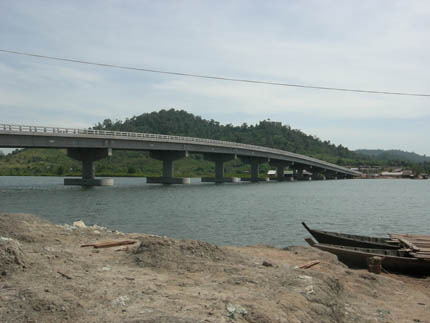
- Koh Kong Bridge

- Location within Cambodia
- Coordinates: 11°37′N 102°59′E
- Country: Cambodia
- Province: Koh Kong Province
- Municipality: Khemarak Phoumin
- Elevation: 3 m (9.8 ft)

Population (2019)
  - Total: 28,836
- Time zone: UTC+7 (ICT)

Khemarak Phoumin (Khmer: ក្រុងខេមរភូមិន្ទ, lit. 'King (Pali: Indra of the peaceful (Pali: khemara/Khmer) land (Pali: bhūmi)'), also Koh Kong (Khmer: ក្រុងកោះកុង), is the capital and largest city of Koh Kong Province in Cambodia. It is near the mouth of the Kah Bpow river in Smach Mean Chey District on the Gulf of Thailand. The city lies only 10 kilometres (6.2 mi) from the Thai border. It is 138 kilometres (86 mi) by Highway 48 to National Highway 4 at Sre Ambel and a further 133 kilometres (83 mi) to Phnom Penh.

== Frontier town ==
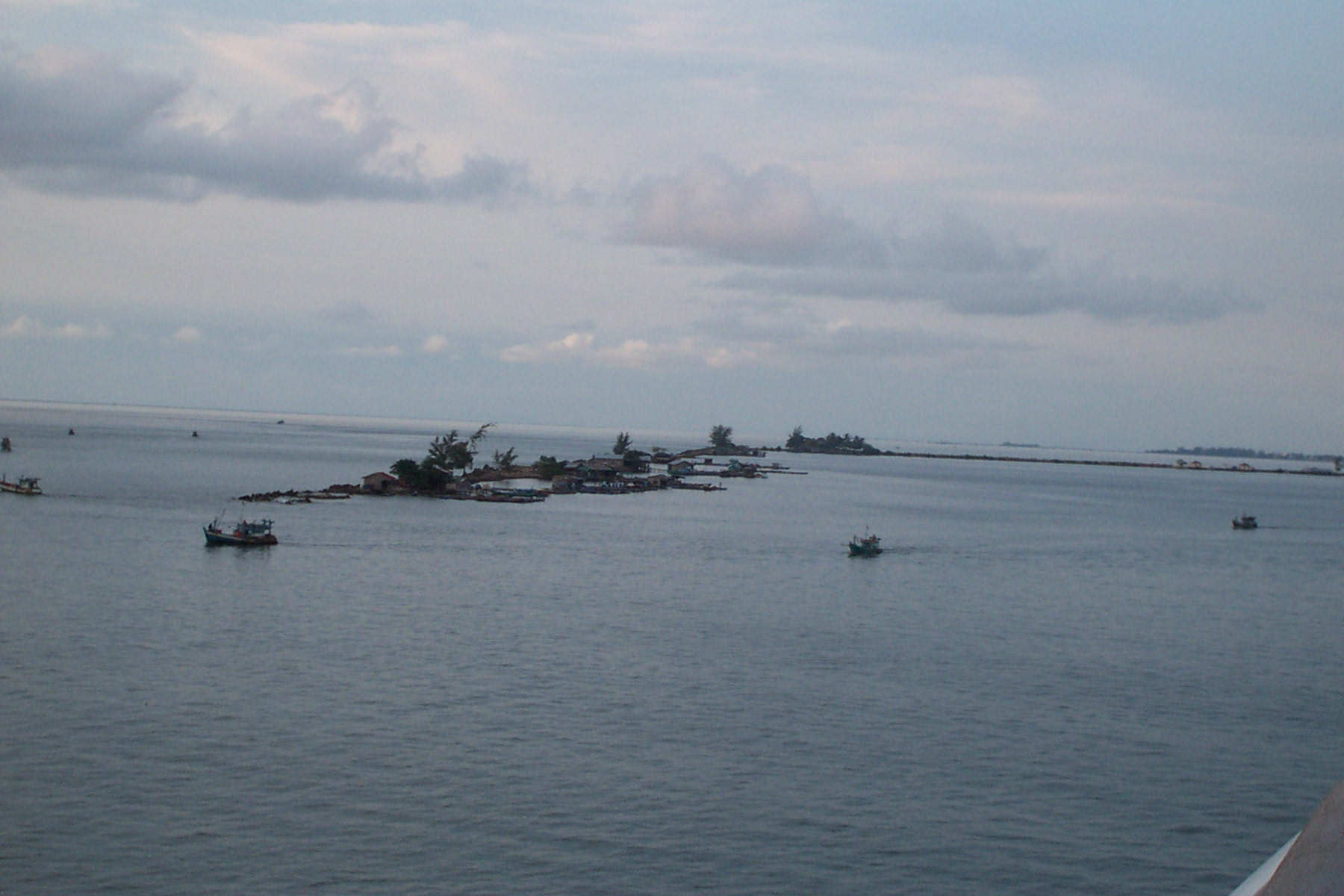
Cambodian fishing boats, Gulf of Thailand

Koh Kong has long had a reputation as a "wild west" frontier town. Until recently, access to the town from Cambodia was mostly by sea or air due to the poor road conditions. In this relative isolation, illegal logging, wild animal smuggling, banditry, gambling, prostitution, and a soaring rate of HIV AIDS infection have given Koh Kong its frontier town reputation. However, with the building of the Thai-Cambodian Koh Kong Bridge across the river in 2002, and the upgrading of the road to the national highway, industry and investment have increased and the town is gradually becoming a modest tourist destination.

== Location ==
Koh Kong town is accessible by land, sea, and air. From Bangkok it is 450 kilometres (280 mi) by road to Hat Lek in Khlong Yai District in Thailand and a short trip from there to the Cham Yeam international border crossing. From the border it is 10 kilometres (6.2 mi) to the town. Travelling from the capital Phnom Penh, it is 133 kilometres (83 mi) west along National Highway 4 to the town of Sre Ambel. From Sre Ambel a narrow road winds 138 kilometres (86 mi) through the lower Cardamom Mountains before reaching Koh Kong. The road crosses four large rivers where bridges have recently been built. In 2002, the Koh Kong Bridge was completed linking the town of Koh Kong with the border crossing to Thailand. The bridge was completed at a cost of US$7.2 million and is 1,900 metres (6,200 ft) long, making it the second longest bridge in Cambodia.

== Recent history ==
Until the end of the 1990s, Koh Kong was one of the least secure parts of the country. Remaining elements of the Khmer Rouge based in the lower Cardamoms still posed a serious threat to locals and travellers. The area was the scene of intermittent fighting between the government and Democratic Kampuchea forces until 1998.

On 21 April 1984, the Khmer Rouge captured the town of Koh Kong and held it for a night and day. They claimed via Khmer Rouge Radio to have killed 1,107 Vietnamese troops and injured 125 more during the battle. On 6 June 1985 Khmer Rouge troops attacked an outpost near the provincial town. Khmer Rouge Radio reported that they had killed 28 Vietnamese soldiers and injured 34 others. They attacked the Koh Kong Casino with rifles, rocket-propelled grenades, and mortars.

As late as 1998, the Khmer Rouge were still active in the area. In November of that year, one of the last recorded deleterious incidents before the surrender of the remaining Khmer Rouge forces to the government occurred near the international border crossing outside of Koh Kong city. On Monday night at 18:10, the casino attached to the Koh Kong International Resort was attacked by elements of the Khmer Rouge. One Thai gambler was injured in the attack which involved rocket-propelled grenades, mortars and conventional rifles. The Trat police chief later stated that the attack was prompted by the casino failing to make a protection payment to the rebel group.

== Environment ==
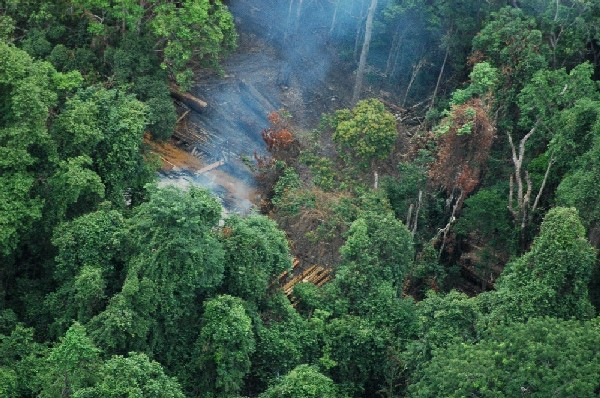
Overflight of an illegal logging camp, Cardamom Mountains, Koh Kong Province

Koh Kong town is just below the southern end of the Cardamom Mountains. The Kah Bpow river which runs through the town begins in the Cardamoms and runs down to join the Gulf of Thailand. The town's relatively remote location, close to the Cardamoms and the Thai border, has made it the centre of an active wildlife smuggling trade. Much wildlife captured in the Central Cardamoms goes to supply the restaurants and fresh markets in Koh Kong town. Wild meat is usually for local consumption but various animals parts, bones, and hides are sold to wildlife traders. In 2000, wildlife traders from Thailand were reported to come to Koh Kong town each month to purchase wildlife products. Some trophies are also reported to be sold to Trat Province in Thailand.

In 2005, Cambodia's infamous tiger hunter Yor Ngun was finally captured in Koh Kong town. He was eventually charged with having killed and sold at least 19 tigers, 40 leopards, 30 elephants, 500 gaur, banteng and sambar, 40 sun bears and three Asian black bears. Ngun, who was 57 at the time of his arrest, is reported to have been trapping and snaring animals in the Cambodian jungle since the 1970s. The organisation Wildlife Alliance (known at the time as WildAid) had Ngun on their "top wanted hunters list" since 2001 due to his reputation as a "notorious tiger hunter". Authorities captured him once in 2004, but he was released after signing an agreement to stop poaching. At the time of his arrest in Koh Kong, he was carrying animal parts, including 25 bear jaws and 82 bear nails. In August 2005, he was sentenced at the Koh Kong provincial court to seven years in prison.

Koh Kong township and the area nearby was also the centre of widespread illegal logging of broad leaf deciduous forests in the Cardamoms. According to environmental agencies, the government logging ban in 2001 has slowed, but not halted, the logging trade.

== Climate ==
Khemarak Phoumin has a tropical monsoon climate (Köppen Am), similar to the climates found in the Myanmar cities of Sittwe and Mawlamyine, with moderate to very little rainfall from November to April and very heavy to extremely heavy rainfall from May to October. Orographic influences from the Cardamom Mountains produce an annual rainfall about three times that of Phnom Penh or Siem Reap.

Climate data for Khemarak Phoumin (1982–2024)
Month	Jan	Feb	Mar	Apr	May	Jun	Jul	Aug	Sep	Oct	Nov	Dec	Year
Mean daily maximum °C (°F)	31.4 (88.5)	31.7 (89.1)	32.0 (89.6)	33.3 (91.9)	33.6 (92.5)	32.9 (91.2)	32.1 (89.8)	31.7 (89.1)	31.5 (88.7)	31.3 (88.3)	30.9 (87.6)	30.5 (86.9)	31.9 (89.4)
Mean daily minimum °C (°F)	21.9 (71.4)	22.3 (72.1)	23.1 (73.6)	23.4 (74.1)	24.5 (76.1)	24.0 (75.2)	23.4 (74.1)	23.2 (73.8)	22.9 (73.2)	22.7 (72.9)	22.0 (71.6)	22.0 (71.6)	23.0 (73.3)
Average precipitation mm (inches)	33.6 (1.32)	86.8 (3.42)	103.4 (4.07)	269.8 (10.62)	479.9 (18.89)	561.5 (22.11)	567.3 (22.33)	592.4 (23.32)	489.7 (19.28)	319.5 (12.58)	103.6 (4.08)	57.6 (2.27)	3,665.1 (144.29)
Source: World Meteorological Organization

== Economy ==
As of 2019, a deep-sea port is being developed in Koh Kong by Cambodian tycoon Ly Yong Phat.

== See also ==
- Special Economic Zones of Cambodia
- Koh Kong (island)
