= Botum Sakor District =

Botum Sakor ស្រុកបុទុមសាគរ
- District (srok)
- Location in Cambodia
- Country: Cambodia
- Province: Koh Kong
- Communes: 4
- Villages: 20

Population (1998)
  - Total: 18,822
- Time zone: UTC+7 (ICT)
- Geocode: 0901

Botum Sakor (Khmer: បទុមសាគរ) is a district (srok) of Koh Kong Province, in south-western Cambodia. The entire district is to be protected as a national park since 1993.

== Administration ==
Botum Sakor District
Khum (Commune)	Phum (Villages)
Andoung Teuk	Andoung Tuek, Chi Meal, Prai, Chi Treh, Prateal, Ta Meakh, Ta Ok
Kandoal	Kandaol, Prolean, Tam Kan, Thnong
Ta Nuon	Ta Nun, Tuol Pou, Preaek Khyang, Bak Ronoas
Thmar Sa	Chamlang Kou, Chamkar Leu, Srae Thmei, Srae Trav, Thma Sa

== See also ==
- Botum Sakor National Park
