= Kaoh Pao River =

River in Koh Kong Province, Cambodia

Coordinates: 11.607470°N 102.969509°E

Kaoh Pao River (Khmer: កោះប៉ោ, Thai: เกาะปอ; RTGS: Ko Po; Thai pronunciation: [kɔ̀ʔ pɔː]), also Prek Khao Pao or Preaek Khao Pao, is a river and estuary in Koh Kong Province, Cambodia. It flows past the provincial capital of Khemarak Phoumin, and empties into the Gulf of Thailand.
