= Leay Bour Commune =

Leay Bour ឃុំលាយបូរ
- Commune (Khum)
- Location within Cambodia
- Coordinates: 11°00′17″N 104°42′57″E
- Country: Cambodia
- Province: Takéo
- District: Tram Kak
- Time zone: UTC+7
- Geocode: 210904

Leay Bour Commune (Khmer: ឃុំលាយបូរ) is a khum (commune) in Tram Kak District, Takéo Province, Cambodia.

== Administration ==
As of 2019, Leay Bour Commune has 25 phums (villages) as follows.

No.	Code	Village	Khmer
1	21090401	Chreae	ជ្រែ
2	21090402	Khnar	ខ្នារ
3	21090403	Prey Theat	ព្រៃធាតុ
4	21090404	Trapeang Kur	ត្រពាំងគូរ
5	21090405	Tuol Tbaeng	ទួលត្បែង
6	21090406	Angk Kokir	អង្គគគីរ
7	21090407	Trapeang Chhuk	ត្រពាំងឈូក
8	21090408	Prey Kuy	ព្រៃគុយ
9	21090409	Ampil	អំពិល
10	21090410	Angk Ta Kob	អង្គតាកុប
11	21090411	Boeng	បឹង
12	21090412	Kach Trak	កាច់ត្រក
13	21090413	Trapeang Trach	ត្រពាំងត្រាច
14	21090414	Thyea	ធ្យា
15	21090415	Thnong Roleung	ធ្នង់រលើង
16	21090416	Trapeang Pring	ត្រពាំងព្រីង
17	21090417	Angk Ta Chan	អង្គតាចាន់
18	21090418	Prasat	ប្រាសាទ
19	21090419	Angk Ta Nu	អង្គតានូ
20	21090420	Bak Koud	បាក់កូដ
21	21090421	Trapeang Kak	ត្រពាំងកក់
22	21090422	Angk Neareay	អង្គនារាយណ៍
23	21090423	Sla	ស្លា
24	21090424	Seima	សីម៉ា
25	21090425	Saen Ban	សែនបន
