= Special Economic Zones of Cambodia =

Areas designated for special business and trade regulations

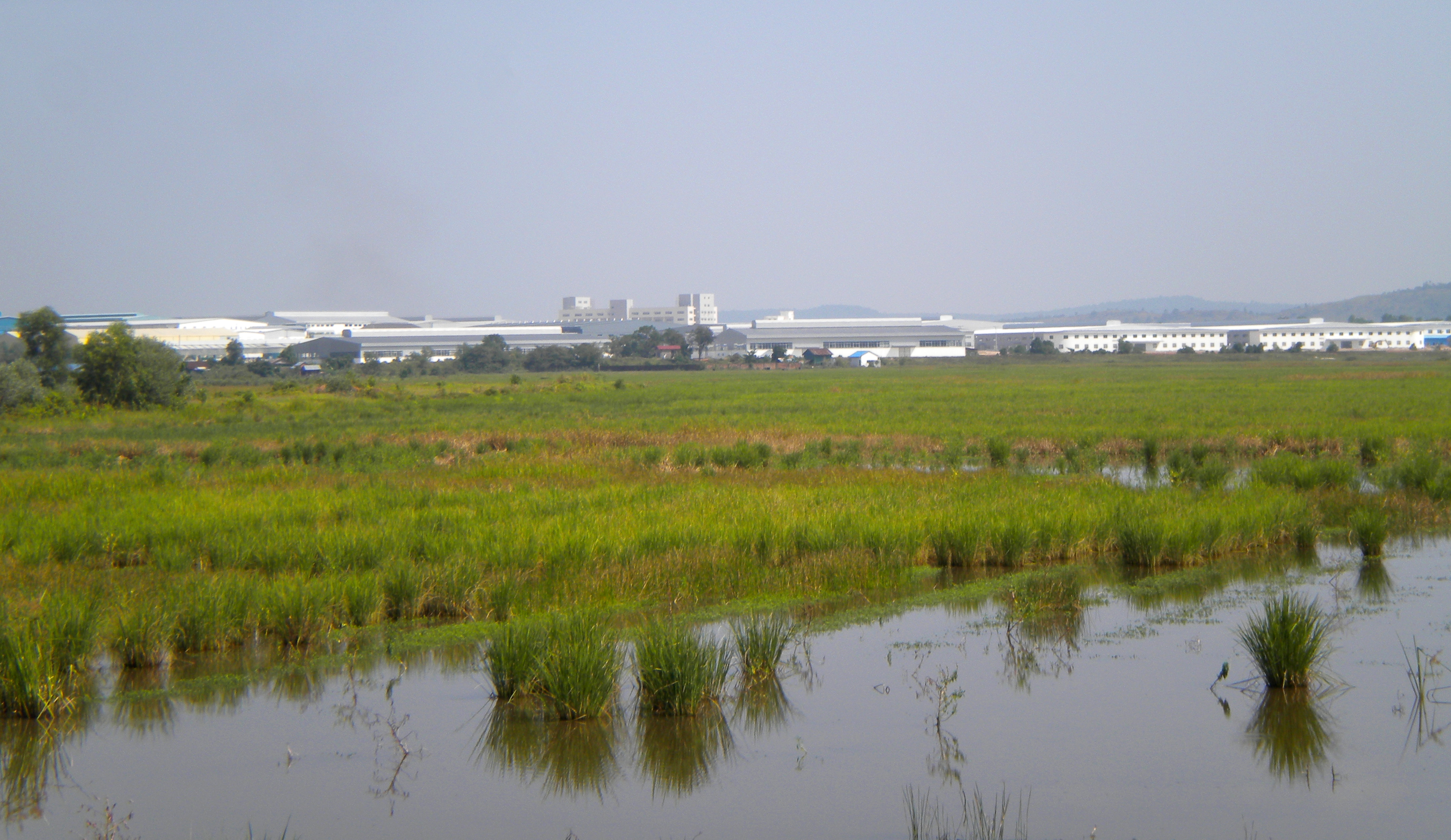
Sihanoukville's Special Economic Zone (SSEZ) as seen from National Highway No. 4 near Ream commune

Special Economic Zones of Cambodia are geographical areas within Cambodia's borders that have been specially designated by the national government in which business and trade regulations differ from those that apply to the rest of the country. Special economic zones, in general, are common in various economies around the world and are established to meet the needs of the specific business environment of each host country, ranging from encouraging foreign investment to job creation to streamlined administration of multinational ventures.

Approved in 2005 with implementation beginning in 2006, Cambodia's Special Economic Zones provide businesses within each zone with a number of fiscal incentives, including income tax, customs, and VAT benefits and are "designed to offer a one-stop service for imports and exports, and have specially trained government officials stationed on site to provide administrative services".

The 22 currently approved SEZs in Cambodia operate under the authority of the Cambodia Special Economic Zone Board under the umbrella of the Council for the Development of Cambodia (CDC) for "the purposes of enhancing the competitiveness and attracting investment in the Kingdom of Cambodia". According to a report by the CDC, as of late 2013, Cambodia's SEZs had attracted US$1.65 billion in total investment from 172 investment projects, most of which were initiated by China, South Korea and Japan, and added 105,000 jobs to the Cambodian economy.

== The zones ==
Name	Location	Name	Location
Sihanoukville Special Economic Zone	Sihanoukville	Sihanoukville Port	Sihanoukville
Neang Kok Koh Kong	Koh Kong	Suoy Chheng	Koh Kong
S.N.C.	Sihanoukville	Steung Hav	Sihanoukville
N.L.C.	Svay Rieng	(Svay Rieng)	Svay Rieng
Poipet O’Neang	Banteay Meanchey	Doung Chhiv Phnom Den	Takeo
Phnom Penh SEZ	Phnom Penh	Kampot SEZ	Kampot
Sihanoukville SEZ 1	Sihanoukville	Sihanoukville SEZ 2	Sihanoukville
Tai Seng Bavet	Svay Rieng	Oknha Mong	Koh Kong
Goldfame Pak Shun	Kandal	Thary Kampong Cham	Kampong Cham
D&M Bavet	Svay Rieng	Kiri Sakor Koh Kong	Koh Kong
Suvannaphum Investment	Kandal	Pacific SEZ	Svay Rieng
Kampong Saom	Sihanoukville		
