= Khemarak Phoumin Municipality =

Khemarak Phoumin municipality ក្រុងខេមរភូមិន្ទ
- Municipality
- Location in Cambodia
- Coordinates: 11°36′41″N 102°58′50″E
- Country: Cambodia
- Province: Koh Kong
- Quarters: 3
- Villages: 11
- Capital: Khemarak Phoumin

Government
  - Type: City municipality

Population (1998)
  - Total: 29,329
- Time zone: UTC+7 (ICT)
- Geocode: 0904

Khemarak Phoumin municipality (Khmer: ក្រុងខេមរភូមិន្ទ) is a municipality located in Koh Kong province in south-western Cambodia. The provincial capital Khemarak Phoumin is located in the municipality.

== Administration ==
No.	District code	Sangkat (quarters)	Phum (villages)
1	0904-01	Smach Mean Chey សង្កាត់ស្មាច់មានជ័យ	Phum Ti Muoy; Phum Ti Pir; Phum Ti Bei; Boeng Khun Chhang; Smach Mean Chey
2	0904-02	Dang Tong សង្កាត់ដងទង់	Phum Ti Muoy; Phum Ti Pir; Phum Ti Bei; Phum Ti Buon
3	0904-03	Steung Veng សង្កាត់ស្ទឹងវែង	Steung Veng; Prek Svay
