= Koh Kong District =

Koh Kong ស្រុកកោះកុង
- District (srok)
- Location in Cambodia

- Location in Cambodia
- Coordinates: 11°30′N 103°10′E
- Country: Cambodia
- Province: Koh Kong
- Communes: 4
- Villages: 11

Population (1998)
  - Total: 8,817
- Time zone: +7
- Geocode: 0903

Koh Kong District (Khmer: ស្រុកកោះកុង) is a district (srok) of Koh Kong Province, in south-western Cambodia. The southern parts of Koh Kong district is part of Botum Sakor National Park since 1993. It comprise roughly one-third of the district.

== Administration ==
The district is subdivided into three khum (communes) and nine phum (villages).

Koh Kong District
Khum (Commune)	Phum (Villages)
Chrouy Pras	Chrouy Pras, Thmei
Kaoh Kapi	Phum Ti Muoy, Phum Ti Pir, Kaoh Sralau
Ta Tai Kraom	Kaoh Andaet, Anlong Vak
Trapeang Rung	Dei Tumneab, Kaoh Kong Knong, Preaek Angkonh, Trapeang Rung

== See also ==
- Botum Sakor National Park
