= Koh Kong province =

Province of Cambodia

Koh Kong Province ខេត្តកោះកុង
- Province

Khmer transcription(s)
  - Khmer: ខេត្តកោះកុង
  - UNGEGN: Khaet Kǎh Kŏng
  - ALA-LC: Khett Koaḥ Kung
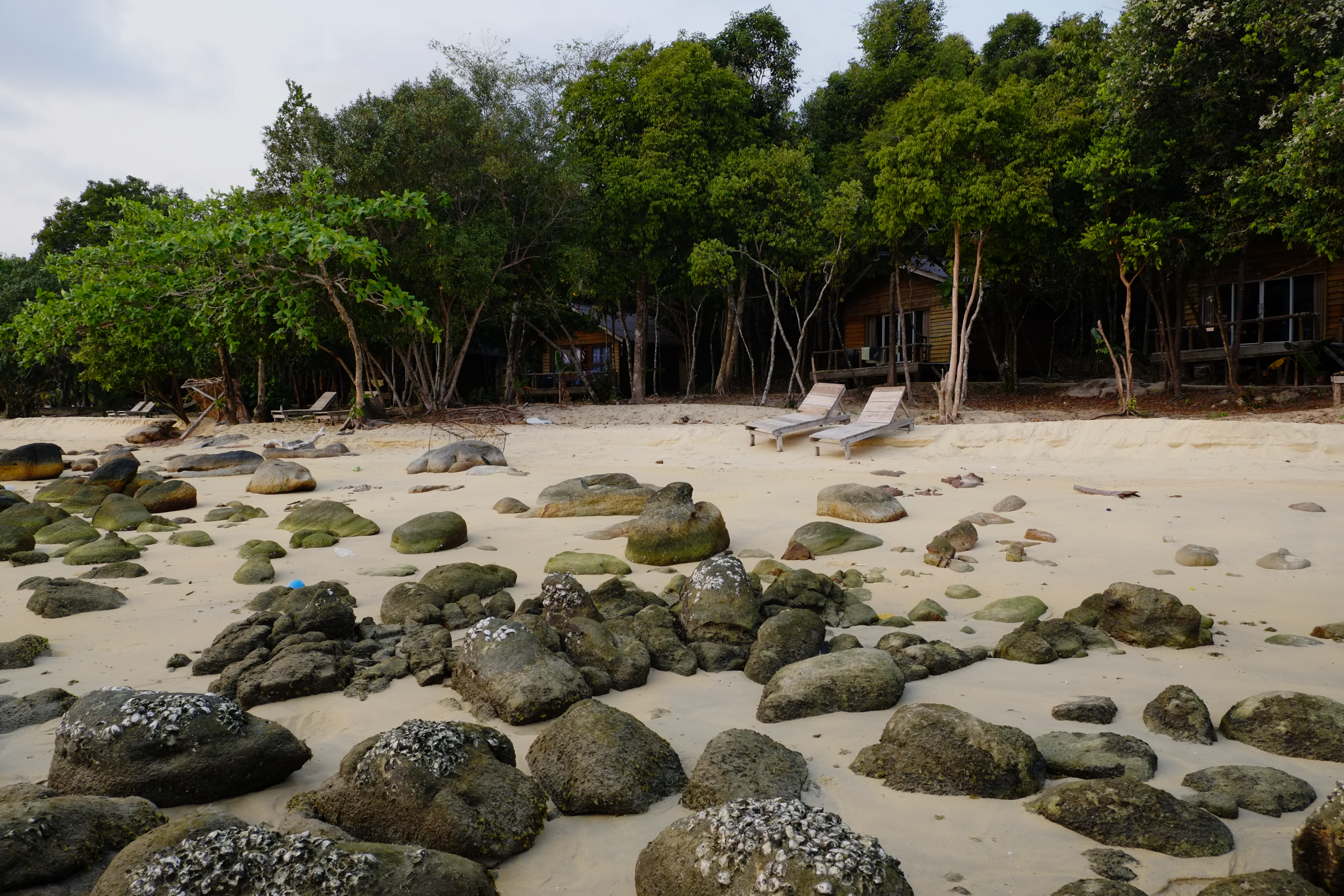
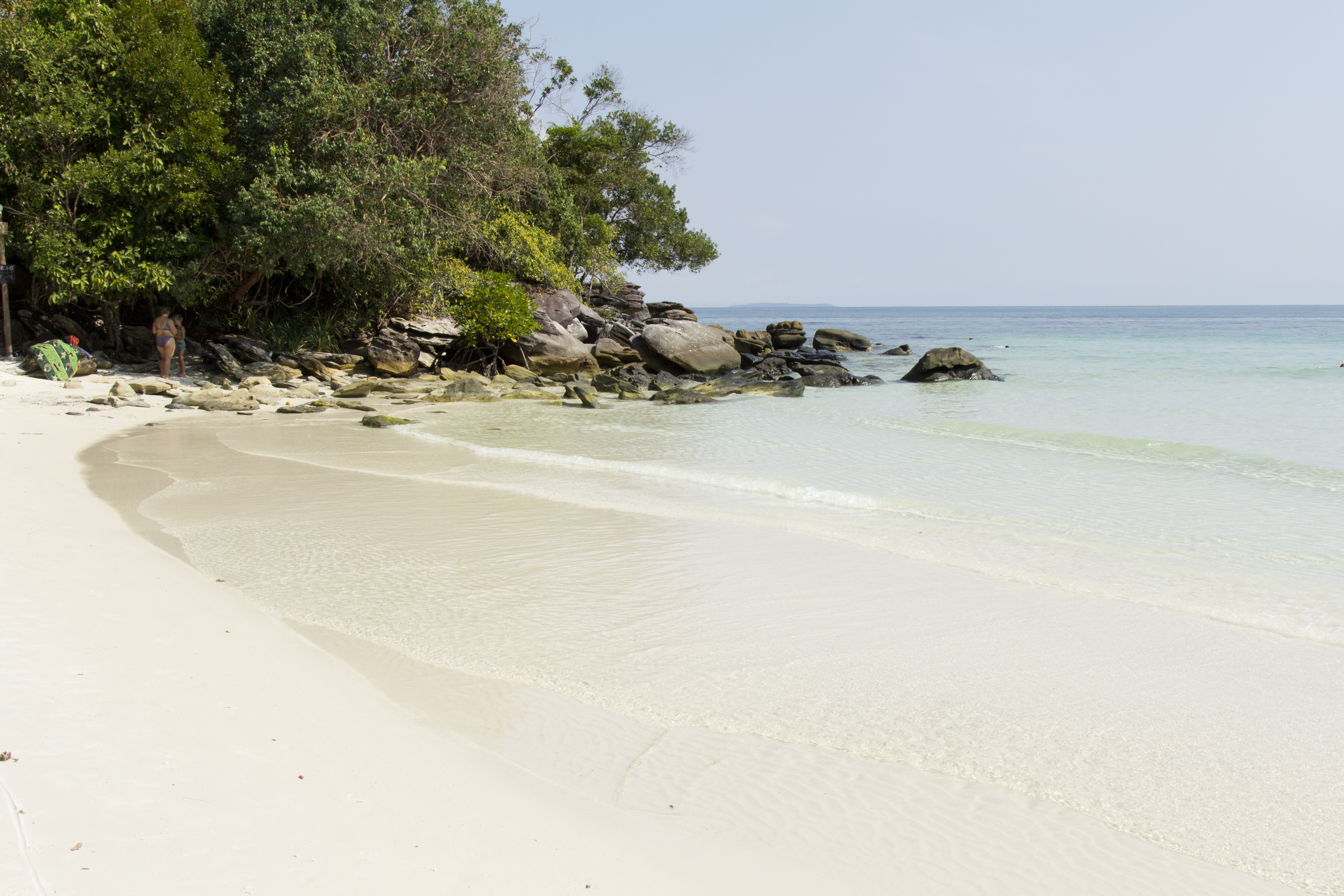
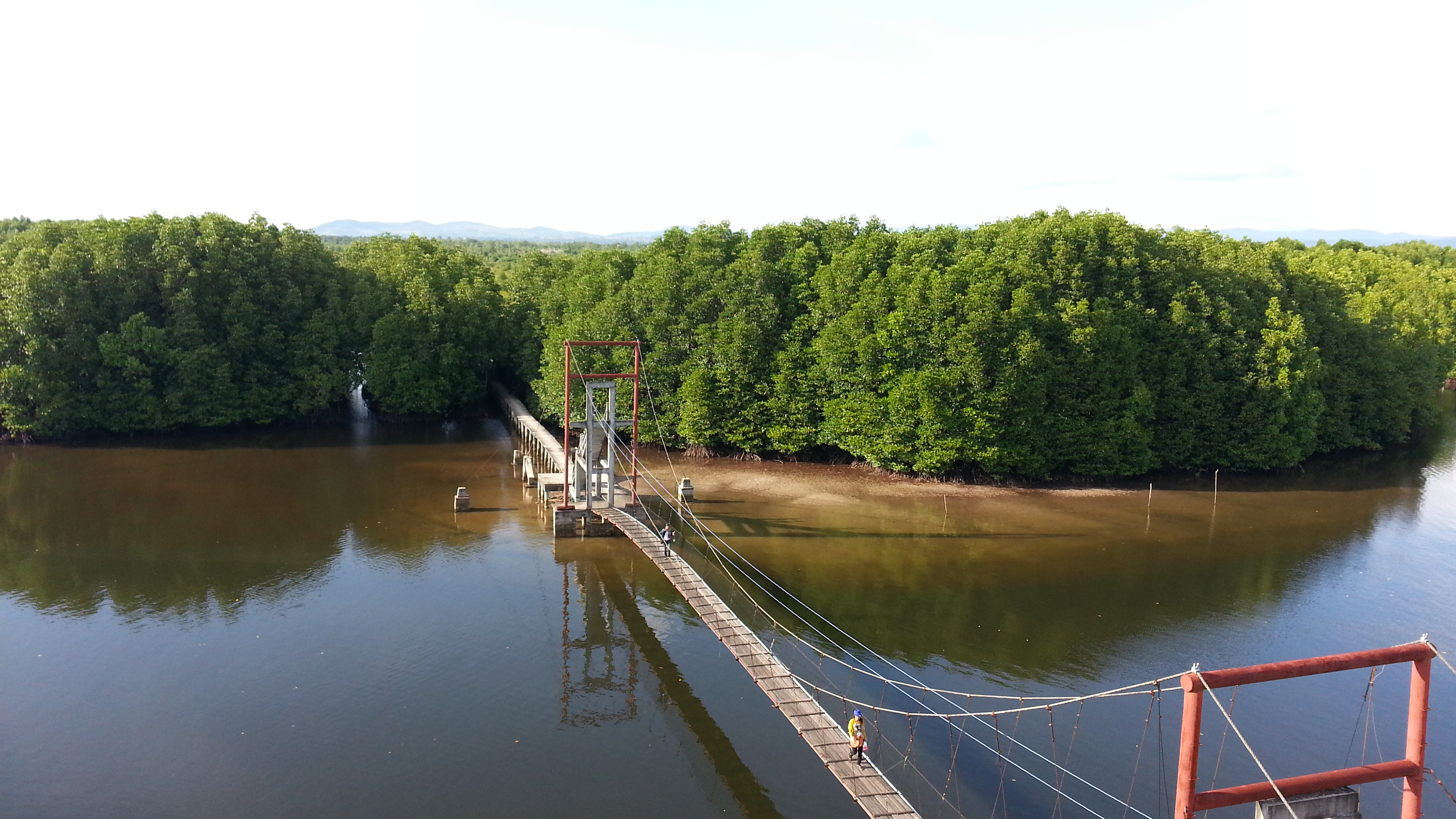
- Top: Beaches of Koh Kong; Bottom: Aerial view of Kong Kang Forest

- Seal

- Map of Cambodia highlighting Koh Kong
- Coordinates: 11°23′57″N 103°29′41″E
- Country: Cambodia
- Provincial status: 13 January 1958
- Capital: Khemarak Phoumin

Government
  - Governor: Chhy Va (CPP)
  - National Assembly: 1 / 125

Area
  - Total: 10,090 km^{2} (3,900 sq mi)
  - Rank: 6th

Population (2024)
  - Total: ▲140,962
  - Rank: 22nd
  - Density: 12/km^{2} (31/sq mi)
  - Rank: 24th

Demographics
  - Languages: Khmer (official)
- Time zone: UTC+07:00 (ICT)
- Dialing code: +855
- ISO 3166 code: KH-9
- Districts: 8
- Communes: 33
- Villages: 133
- HDI (2019): 0.622 medium · 3rd
- Website: kohkong.gov.kh

Koh Kong Province (Khmer: ខេត្តកោះកុង, Kǎh Kŏng, [kɑh koŋ]; lit. 'curved island') is a province of Cambodia. Its capital is Khemarak Phoumin (Koh Kong).

== Geography ==
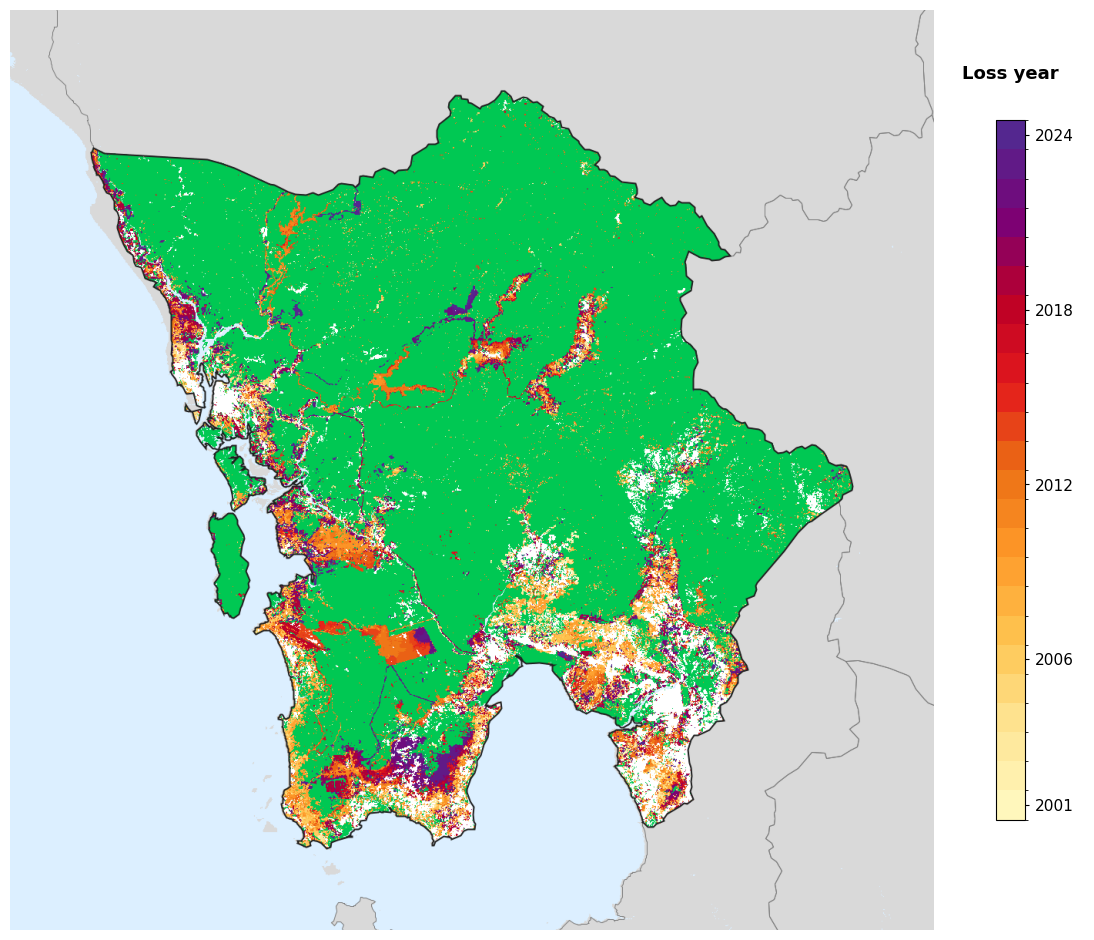
Tree-cover loss year in Koh Kong, 2001-2024, from the Global Forest Change dataset.

The most southwestern province of Cambodia, Koh Kong has a long undeveloped coastline and a mountainous, forested, and largely inaccessible interior which includes part of the Cardamom Mountains, Cambodia's largest national park (Botum Sakor National Park), and a section of Kirirom National Park. By the early 2010s, Conservation International's Central Cardamom Mountains programme in Cambodia was operating primarily in the Cardamom Mountains portions of Koh Kong and Pursat provinces, combining forest and biodiversity protection with land-use planning and rural livelihood activities. Parts of the province were designated as Central Cardamom Mountains National Park in 2016.

== History ==
After Cambodia's liberation from the Khmer Rouge in 1979, following the Koh Kong Thai displacement campaign, the province was quite under-populated. After the national government encouraged people to live in Koh Kong, there has been a net influx of people. It is estimated that the average annual growth rate in Koh Kong is 16%, which has put pressure on the mangrove resources in the province. Koh Kong's towns have developed rapidly partially in response to market pressures from Thailand and because of immigration from other parts of Cambodia.

== Economy ==
The province has been the site of a Sino-Cambodian port development project in Dara Sakor. The project is planned to spread over 45,000 hectares, to include casinos, golf courses, and resorts. A 20 kilometre stretch of coastline will be turned into a deep-water port to accommodate cruise ships as well as freight. Near the port, an airfield with a runway 3,400 metres is longer than needed for commercial flights, while its turning bays are too small for civilian aircraft. Therefore, analysts suspect that the port project is a Cambodian-Chinese civil-military collaboration that will permit the Chinese navy to use the facilities as a forward operating base. Responding to US concerns, Prime Minister Hun Sen has denied the charge, pointing out that the Cambodian constitution "...has no provision for accommodating foreign military bases on its soil."

== Districts ==
The province is divided into six districts and one municipality:

ISO code	District	Khmer
09-01	Botum Sakor	ស្រុកបទុមសាគរ
09-02	Kiri Sakor	ស្រុកគិរីសាគរ
09-03	Koh Kong	ស្រុកកោះកុង
09-04	Khemarak Phoumin Municipality (formerly Smach Mean Chey)	ក្រុងខេមរភូមិន្ទ (អតីត ស្រុកស្មាច់មានជ័យ)
09-05	Mondol Seima	ស្រុកមណ្ឌលសីមា
09-06	Srae Ambel	ស្រុកស្រែអំបិល
09-07	Thma Bang	ស្រុកថ្មបាំង
